= South Africa–European Union relations =

- European Union: South Africa

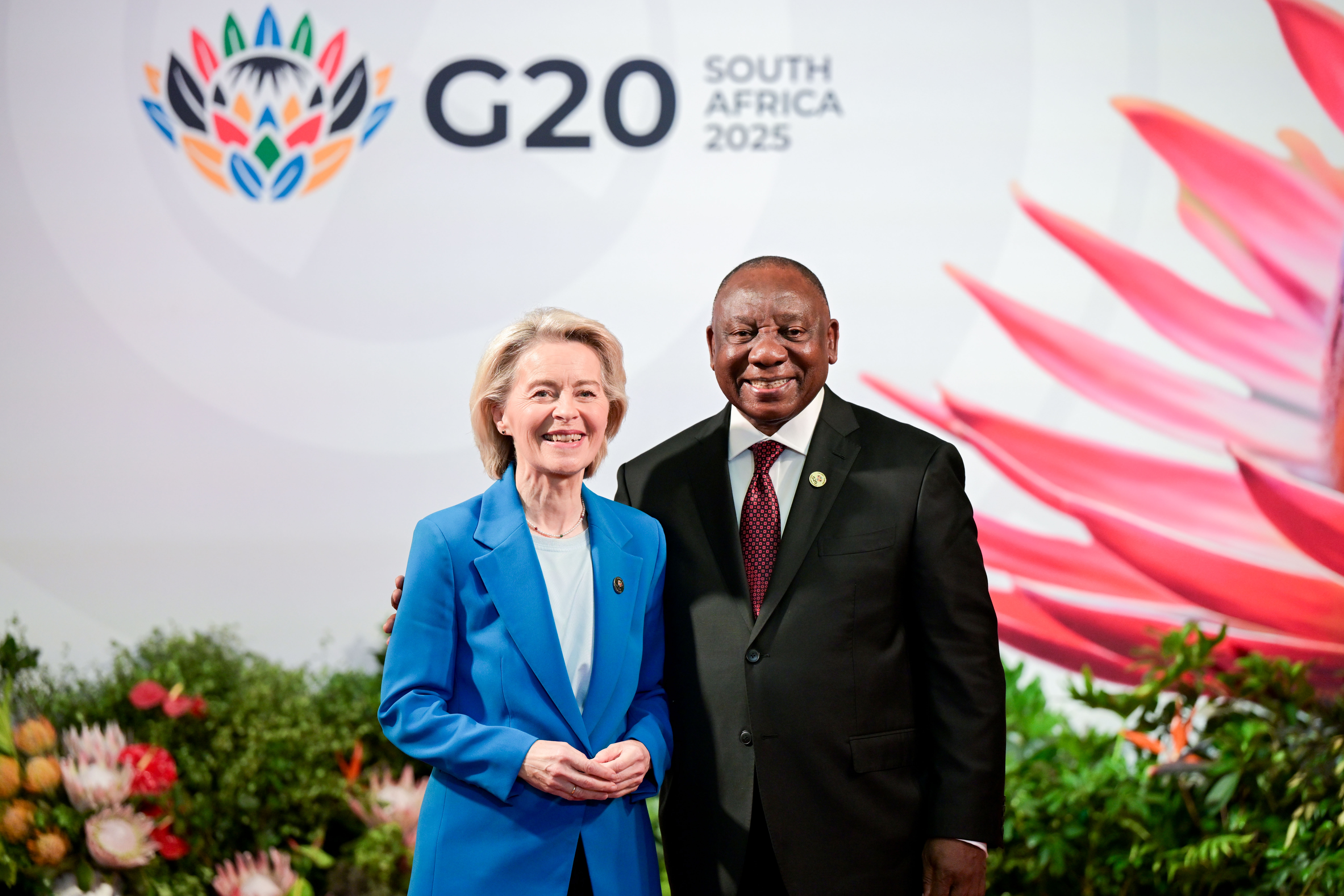
Meeting between Ursula von der Leyen, President of the European Commission, and Cyril Ramaphosa, President of South Africa, during the 2025 G20 Johannesburg summit.

The European Union (EU) has strong cultural and historical links to South Africa (particularly through immigration from the Netherlands, Ireland, Germany, France, and Greece) and the EU is South Africa's biggest investor.

South Africa and the European Union (EU) maintain a strong bilateral relationship, rooted in shared values of democracy, human rights, multilateralism and social justice. The EU was a steadfast supporter of South Africa's transition to democracy, and this strong foundation continues to underpin the bilateral relationship. The EU is represented in South Africa with a diplomatic mission in Pretoria (EU Delegation), and in turn, South Africa's diplomatic representation to the EU is domiciled in Brussels where several EU institutions are located.

== Agreements ==
Since the end of South Africa's apartheid, EU South African relations have flourished and they began a "Strategic Partnership" in 2007. In 1999 the two sides signed a Trade, Development and Cooperation Agreement (TDCA) which entered into force in 2004, with some provisions being applied from 2000. The TDCA covered a wide range of issues from political cooperation, development and the establishment of a free trade area (FTA). The liberalisation schedules were completed by 2012. Since the signing of the Agreement, trade in goods between the two partners has increased by more than 120%, and foreign direct investment has grown five-fold. In March 2025, European Commission President Ursula von der Leyen announced that the European Union would invest €4.7 billion ($5 billion) in aid and development projects in South Africa, after the United States ended most of its USAID programs.

== Strategic partnership ==
Since 2007, the EU and South Africa have had a wide-ranging Strategic Partnership, the EU's only such partnership with an African country. Presidential summits, ministerial meetings and senior officials meetings are an essential part of EU-South Africa relations and draw on sectoral dialogues and meetings. Shared priorities of decarbonisation, reduction of dependencies and diversification of value chains, job creation and transition to a green and digital socio-economic growth model have become increasingly important.

The Strategic Partnership is strengthened by a 'Team Europe approach', which brings together wide-ranging resources and expertise of the EU, its 27 Member States (22 being represented in South Africa), and includes their respective implementing agencies and development finance institutions as well as the European Investment Bank (EIB)

The EU-South Africa partnership provides the framework for the implementation of Global Gateway, the EU's external investment strategy, as well as the EU's commitment to strengthen multilateralism, human rights and cultural relations. The partnership is enhanced through the EU Alumni network.

== Summits ==
The first summit between South Africa and the EU was held on 25 July 2008 in Bordeaux, France. A total of eight summits have been held since then.

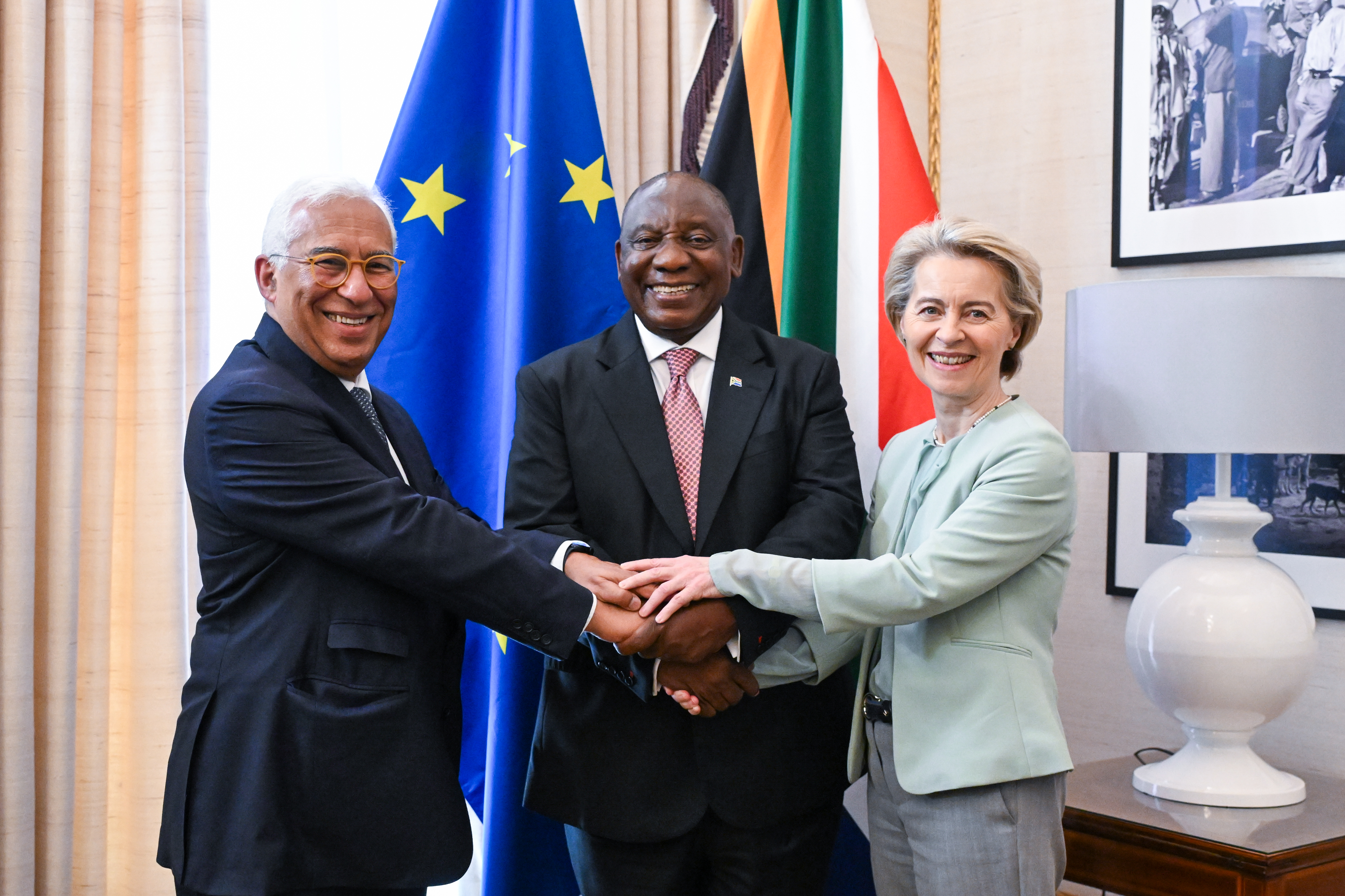
The 8th South Africa-EU Summit was held on 13 March 2025 in Cape Town, South Africa, where President Cyril Ramaphosa hosted European Council President António Costa and European Commission President Ursula von der Leyen.

The 8th South Africa-EU Summit was held on 13 March 2025 in Cape Town, South Africa, where President Cyril Ramaphosa hosted European Council President António Costa and European Commission President Ursula von der Leyen.

According to the joint declaration issued at the Summit, South Africa and the EU agreed to further strengthen trade and investment ties based on shared interests in clean technology and sustainable supply chains. President von der Leyen announced a EUR 4.7 billion EU Global Gateway Investment Package for South Africa to boost mutually beneficial investments through grants as well as leveraged public and private loans. The investment package aligns with the shared priorities of South Africa and the EU, furthering the just energy transition, connectivity infrastructure and South Africa's vaccine production capacity. The leaders also expressed their shared commitment to multilateralism, a consistent approach to the rules-based international order, to the centrality of the United Nations Charter, as well as to the universality and indivisibility of human rights.

The SA-EU Summit's opening remarks of President Cyril Ramaphosa, European Council President António Costa and European Commission President Ursula von der Leyen were published.

On 20 November 2025, South African President Cyril Ramaphosa met with European Council President António Costa and European Commission President Ursula von der Leyen in Johannesburg for a leaders’ stocktaking meeting, on the margins of the G20 Summit. The meeting provided an opportunity to take stock of progress on the political and economic commitments agreed at the 8th South Africa–EU Summit and to reaffirm the partners’ shared support for a rules-based multilateral order.

The leaders welcomed the signing of an EU–South Africa Clean Trade and Investment Partnership and a memorandum of understanding on sustainable minerals and metals value chains. They also noted the launch of the South Africa–EU energy dialogue, which is expected to be elevated to ministerial level in 2026. The European Union announced five new projects under the implementation of its Global Gateway investment package for South Africa, valued at nearly €12 billion. In a joint press statement, the leaders reiterated their commitment to international peace and security, including with regard to Ukraine and the occupied Palestinian territories, and expressed support for efforts to advance a renewed global financing framework for sustainable development.

== Trade and economic partners ==
South Africa is the EU's largest trading partner in Southern Africa and has a FTA with the EU. South Africa's main exports to the EU are fuels and mining products (27%), machinery and transport equipment (18%) and other semi-manufactured goods (16%). However they are growing and becoming more diverse. European exports to South Africa are primarily machinery & transport equipment (50%), chemicals (15%) and other semi-machinery (10%).

With the EU, South Africa has a more diversified and balanced trade than with any other of its trading partners.

The trade relationship is based on the Economic Partnership Agreement (EPA) between the EU and the Southern African Development Community (SADC) states comprising Botswana, Lesotho, Mozambique, Namibia, South Africa and Eswatini. The agreement came into force provisionally on 10 October 2016.

In 2024, the EU remained South Africa's largest trading partner.

According to the South African Reserve Bank (SARB) official balance of payments data, the EU is the largest investor in South Africa, in value terms, with total direct investment of R970 billion as of December 2023, accounting for 45.8% of the total foreign direct investment stocks in South Africa. More than 1200 companies from the EU have invested in South Africa, adding significant local value to South Africa's economy. A Trade and Investment Dialogue takes place between South Africa's Department of Trade, Industry and Competition and the European Commission's Directorate General for Trade. The partners also work on climate action and environmental protection, decarbonisation through renewables and sustainable energy to ensure a just and green recovery through the Just Energy Transition Partnership (JETP) with South Africa. A range of strategic public and private investment actions blend EU grants, loans and de-risking tools in pursuit of job creation and sustainable growth.

EU – South Africa trade in 2013
Direction of trade	Goods	Services	Investment stocks
EU to South Africa	€24.5 billion	€7.2 billion	€41.8 billion
South Africa to EU	€15.6 billion	€4.5 billion	€7.7 billion

== Higher education and Erasmus+ ==
Education and skills development is one of several areas of cooperation between South Africa and the European Union. The cooperation covers the whole education spectrum, including early childhood education, basic education, higher education, teacher education and development, career development services, niche skills training, international exchange and mobility interventions. Current initiatives include the Regional Teacher Initiative for Africa, the Career Path Development for Employment (CPD4E) project that supports the training of urgently needed skilled workers for the energy transition while also enabling access to new green jobs, as well as the Erasmus+ programme. More than 4,000 students from both South Africa and Europe benefitted from the student mobility in between 2021 and 2024.

== Science, technology, and innovation ==
The EU and South Africa have close to 30 years of successful cooperation in science, technology and innovation. Scientific collaboration between the two was established under the Science and Technology Cooperation Agreement concluded in 1996 and entered into force in November 1997. This was the first agreement that the EU signed with South Africa since the advent of democracy in 1994 and the country is the only one in sub-Saharan Africa that has signed a Science and Technology Cooperation agreement with the EU. It is to be noted that science, technology and innovation projects are the flagship of the overall South Africa-EU cooperation and of the subsequent EU-South Africa Summits.

The bilateral cooperation in science, technology and innovation is guided by the Science and Technology Cooperation Agreement (TDCA), as well as the EU-SA Strategic Partnership. Within this framework, a strong dialogue between the EU and South Africa around science and technology has been developed. It takes place at different levels and through various structures. At bilateral level, active engagement inter alia occurs through annual Joint Science and Technology Cooperation Committee meetings (JSTCC) and Joint CC meetings.

=== Horizon Europe ===
South Africa is the third most-important country of 151 countries to receive funding from Horizon Europe, making it the clear frontrunner in Africa, and one of the biggest participants in various programmes. The funding allows South African researchers to engage in EU-funded research consortia focused on climate, health, digital innovation, and inclusive growth. The funding also enables joint investment in research capacity and doctoral training through co-funded programmes.

=== Joint research initiatives ===
Notably among the many joint initiatives is the renewal of the agreement in December 2018, and again in 2023, between South Africa and the European Commission's Joint Research Centre. This collaboration has facilitated extensive research and technology exchange, enabling both regions to leverage their strengths in addressing global challenges such as renewable energy and climate change.

=== European Cooperation in Science and Technology (COST) ===
In 2019, South Africa became the first country to attain Partner Member status with European Cooperation in Science and Technology, allowing South African researchers to engage more deeply with European counterparts.

=== Square Kilometre Array (SKA) ===
South Africa has been key in advancing the Square Kilometre Array SKA project, where the EU has played a significant role in its early design and development phases.

== European Film Festival ==
The European Film Festival South Africa is a recurring 10-day cultural event organised by the EU Member States represented in South Africa and the EU National Institutes for Culture (EUNIC) Cluster in South Africa. The festival serves as a vital platform for cultural exchange, screening cutting-edge European films that are rarely shown in South African cinema.

The European Film Festival has established itself as a staple event in South Africa, with the 2025 festival marking the 12th edition of the event.

The Festival has proven to include a variety of films, which represent the diversity of Europe, as well as a focus on relatable themes that emphasize the similarities between Europe and South Africa. The 2025 edition of the festival included films from 10 European countries, with the overall theme of "Solidarity, Equality, and Sustainability" mirroring the theme of South Africa’s G20 Presidency, highlighting mutual support and shared priorities.

In addition to showcasing European film, the festival hosts a variety of community orientated events which supplement a deeper cultural exchange. These events include dialogues with film industry experts, public workshops, and special screenings in schools and local communities.

The festival aims to reach wide audiences in South Africa, with screenings taking place in Johannesburg and Cape Town. Furthermore, in 2025, the majority of the selected films were available for online viewing for the complete duration of the festival.

== See also ==
- Foreign relations of the European Union
- Foreign relations of South Africa
- Diplomatic missions of the European Union
- List of diplomatic missions in South Africa
- African, Caribbean and Pacific Group of States
- General Representation of the Government of Flanders in Pretoria

=== South Africa's foreign relations with EU member states ===
- Austria
- Belgium
- Bulgaria
- Croatia
- Cyprus
- Czech Republic
- Denmark
- Estonia
- Finland
- France
- Germany
- Greece
- Hungary
- (Republic of Ireland) Ireland
- Italy
- Latvia
- Lithuania
- Luxembourg
- Malta
- Netherlands
- Poland
- Portugal
- Romania
- Slovakia
- Slovenia
- Spain
- Sweden
