= Foreign relations of South Africa =

The foreign relations of South Africa have spanned from the country's time as a dominion of the British Empire to its isolationist policies under apartheid to its position as a responsible international actor taking a key role in Africa, particularly southern Africa. South Africa is a member of the United Nations, the African Union and the Commonwealth of Nations. Considered a possible permanent addition to the United Nations Security Council, South Africa was elected in 2006, 2010 and 2018 by the UN General Assembly to serve on the Security Council. South African President Cyril Ramaphosa was the chair of the African Union from 2020 to 2021, the second time South Africa has chaired the organisation since its formation in 2003.

== History ==
=== Pre-apartheid ===
South Africa, as a key member of the British Empire and Commonwealth as a Dominion, fought alongside the United Kingdom and the Allies in both World War I and World War II, and it participated in the postwar UN force in the Korean War. South Africa was a founding member of the League of Nations and in 1927 established a Department of External Affairs with diplomatic missions in the main Western European countries and in the United States.

=== Apartheid (1948–1994) ===
South Africa introduced apartheid in 1948, as a systematic extension of pre-existing racial discrimination in the country. As a result, the country became increasingly isolated internationally until apartheid was abolished in 1991 and racial equality introduced between 1990 and 1993. This transition produced a change in South Africa's foreign policy. The country stopped trying to regain regional hegemony and started to behave as a central hub for co-operation as a regional unipole.

=== Post-apartheid (since 1994) ===
Having emerged from the international isolation of the apartheid era, South Africa has become a leading international actor. Its principal foreign policy objective is to develop good relations with all countries, especially its neighbours in the Southern African Development Community (*-see note below) and the other members of the African Union. South Africa has played a key role in seeking an end to various conflicts and political crises on the African continent, including in Burundi, the Democratic Republic of Congo, the Comoros, and Zimbabwe. In August 1998, South Africa assumed the chair of the Non-Aligned Movement, which it relinquished in July 2002.

Eswatini has asked South Africa to open negotiations on reincorporating some nearby South African territories that are populated by ethnic Swazis or that were long ago part of the Swazi kingdom.

== Commonwealth of Nations ==
South Africa was a Dominion of the British Empire and the Commonwealth from 1910 until 1961.

South Africa was a republic outside the Commonwealth from 1961 to 1994, then it became a republic in the Commonwealth of Nations on 1 June 1994.

== United Nations Security Council ==
South Africa was a non-permanent member of the United Nations Security Council from October 2006 until 2008.

South African votes in the UNSC have not been without controversy. In particular, a 'no' vote on a resolution criticising the Burmese government attracted widespread criticism.

== Diplomatic relations ==
List of countries which South Africa maintains diplomatic relations with:

| # | Country | Date |
|---|---|---|
| 1 | Italy | 31 October 1929 |
| 2 | United States | 5 November 1929 |
| 3 | Netherlands | 25 November 1929 |
| 4 | United Kingdom | 10 March 1931 |
| 5 | Belgium | 28 August 1933 |
| 6 | France | 5 November 1934 |
| 7 | Sweden | 30 November 1934 |
| 8 | Portugal | 9 September 1935 |
| 9 | Canada | 11 September 1939 |
| 10 | Greece | 2 September 1941 |
| 11 | Denmark | 4 May 1946 |
| 12 | Norway | 16 June 1946 |
| 13 | Australia | August 1946 |
| 14 | Argentina | 10 September 1947 |
| 15 | Brazil | 31 January 1948 |
| 16 | Chile | May 1948 |
| 17 | Finland | 15 May 1949 |
| 18 | Luxembourg | 1949 |
| 19 | Spain | 18 May 1951 |
| 20 | Germany | 14 August 1951 |
| 21 | Switzerland | 11 March 1952 |
| 22 | Austria | 5 October 1955 |
| 23 | Bolivia | 1967 |
| 24 | Malawi | 10 September 1967 |
| 25 | Uruguay | 22 April 1968 |
| 26 | Paraguay | 3 April 1974 |
| 27 | Israel | 29 December 1975 |
| 28 | Hungary | 24 July 1991 |
| 29 | Estonia | 4 November 1991 |
| 30 | Latvia | 4 November 1991 |
| 31 | Lithuania | 20 November 1991 |
| 32 | Romania | 21 November 1991 |
| 33 | Poland | 18 December 1991 |
| 34 | Japan | 13 January 1992 |
| 35 | Kyrgyzstan | 26 January 1992 |
| 36 | Bulgaria | 2 February 1992 |
| 37 | Russia | 28 February 1992 |
| 38 | Kazakhstan | 5 March 1992 |
| 39 | Ukraine | 16 March 1992 |
| 40 | Serbia | 2 April 1992 |
| 41 | Azerbaijan | 29 April 1992 |
| 42 | Tajikistan | 5 May 1992 |
| 43 | Turkmenistan | 11 May 1992 |
| 44 | Ivory Coast | 21 May 1992 |
| 45 | Lesotho | 21 May 1992 |
| 46 | Moldova | 15 June 1992 |
| 47 | Armenia | 23 June 1992 |
| 48 | Uzbekistan | 12 August 1992 |
| 49 | Democratic Republic of the Congo | 30 September 1992 |
| 50 | Gabon | 15 October 1992 |
| 51 | Turkey | 12 October 1992 |
| 52 | Slovenia | 9 November 1992 |
| 53 | Croatia | 9 November 1992 |
| 54 | Albania | 20 November 1992 |
| 55 | South Korea | 1 December 1992 |
| 56 | Czech Republic | 1 January 1993 |
| 57 | Slovakia | 1 January 1993 |
| 58 | Malta | 10 February 1993 |
| 59 | Belarus | 4 March 1993 |
| 60 | Republic of the Congo | 22 March 1993 |
| 61 | Georgia | 23 April 1993 |
| 62 | San Marino | 30 April 1993 |
| 63 | Equatorial Guinea | 5 May 1993 |
| 64 | Comoros | 14 May 1993 |
| 65 | Peru | 28 July 1993 |
| 66 | Central African Republic | 23 August 1993 |
| 67 | Bahrain | 13 September 1993 |
| 68 | Jordan | 28 September 1993 |
| 69 | Eswatini | 1 October 1993 |
| 70 | Ireland | 5 October 1993 |
| 71 | Mozambique | 11 October 1993 |
| 72 | Singapore | 11 October 1993 |
| 73 | Mexico | 27 October 1993 |
| 74 | Philippines | 1 November 1993 |
| 75 | Seychelles | 4 November 1993 |
| 76 | Malaysia | 8 November 1993 |
| 77 | India | 22 November 1993 |
| 78 | Venezuela | 3 December 1993 |
| 79 | Mauritius | 7 December 1993 |
| 80 | Thailand | 9 December 1993 |
| 81 | Cyprus | 10 December 1993 |
| 82 | Vietnam | 22 December 1993 |
| 83 | Barbados | 4 January 1994 |
| 84 | Liechtenstein | 12 January 1994 |
| 85 | New Zealand | 19 January 1994 |
| 86 | Madagascar | 27 January 1994 |
| — | Holy See | 5 March 1994 |
| 87 | Cape Verde | 4 April 1994 |
| 88 | Colombia | 12 April 1994 |
| 89 | Kenya | 12 April 1994 |
| 90 | Pakistan | 23 April 1994 |
| 91 | Cameroon | 29 April 1994 |
| 92 | Egypt | 29 April 1994 |
| 93 | Zimbabwe | 29 April 1994 |
| 94 | Tunisia | 2 May 1994 |
| 95 | Ghana | 6 May 1994 |
| 96 | Mali | 6 May 1994 |
| 97 | Senegal | 6 May 1994 |
| 98 | Algeria | 10 May 1994 |
| 99 | Iran | 10 May 1994 |
| 100 | Libya | 10 May 1994 |
| 101 | Morocco | 10 May 1994 |
| 102 | Namibia | 10 May 1994 |
| 103 | Niger | 10 May 1994 |
| 104 | Nigeria | 10 May 1994 |
| 105 | Qatar | 10 May 1994 |
| 106 | São Tomé and Príncipe | 10 May 1994 |
| 107 | Sudan | 10 May 1994 |
| 108 | Zambia | 10 May 1994 |
| 109 | Burkina Faso | 11 May 1994 |
| 110 | Cuba | 11 May 1994 |
| 111 | United Arab Emirates | 17 May 1994 |
| 112 | Benin | 19 May 1994 |
| 113 | Kuwait | 20 May 1994 |
| 114 | Mongolia | 25 May 1994 |
| 115 | Angola | 27 May 1994 |
| 116 | Iceland | 31 May 1994 |
| 117 | Syria | 1 June 1994 |
| 118 | Botswana | 22 June 1994 |
| 119 | Uganda | 24 June 1994 |
| 120 | Tanzania | 18 July 1994 |
| 121 | Maldives | 27 July 1994 |
| 122 | Bahamas | 28 July 1994 |
| 123 | Nepal | 28 July 1994 |
| 124 | Indonesia | 12 August 1994 |
| 125 | Laos | 7 September 1994 |
| 126 | Afghanistan | 9 September 1994 |
| 127 | Jamaica | 9 September 1994 |
| 128 | Bangladesh | 10 September 1994 |
| 129 | Nicaragua | 15 September 1994 |
| 130 | Sri Lanka | 16 September 1994 |
| 131 | Ecuador | 22 September 1994 |
| 132 | Costa Rica | 4 October 1994 |
| 133 | Papua New Guinea | 7 October 1994 |
| 134 | Guinea-Bissau | 11 October 1994 |
| 135 | Chad | 21 October 1994 |
| 136 | Saudi Arabia | 29 October 1994 |
| 137 | Guyana | 4 November 1994 |
| 138 | Fiji | 7 November 1994 |
| 139 | Mauritania | 25 December 1994 |
| 140 | Ethiopia | 6 January 1995 |
| 141 | Panama | 10 January 1995 |
| 142 | Trinidad and Tobago | 10 January 1995 |
| 143 | Guatemala | 12 January 1995 |
| 144 | Cambodia | 26 January 1995 |
| 145 | Suriname | 3 February 1995 |
| — | State of Palestine | 15 February 1995 |
| 146 | Guinea | 16 February 1995 |
| 147 | Eritrea | 17 March 1995 |
| 148 | Andorra | 22 March 1995 |
| 149 | Samoa | 22 March 1995 |
| 150 | Bosnia and Herzegovina | 23 March 1995 |
| 151 | Myanmar | 20 April 1995 |
| 152 | Rwanda | 6 May 1995 |
| 153 | Burundi | 23 June 1995 |
| 154 | Saint Vincent and the Grenadines | 1 September 1995 |
| 155 | Oman | 4 October 1995 |
| 156 | Lebanon | 18 November 1995 |
| 157 | Yemen | 3 January 1996 |
| 158 | Marshall Islands | 17 January 1996 |
| 159 | Djibouti | 7 February 1996 |
| — | Cook Islands | 9 February 1996 |
| 160 | Honduras | 4 March 1996 |
| 161 | Brunei | 4 October 1996 |
| 162 | Solomon Islands | 11 December 1996 |
| 163 | Federated States of Micronesia | 12 December 1996 |
| 164 | Saint Lucia | 12 December 1996 |
| 165 | Togo | 5 January 1997 |
| 166 | Liberia | 10 January 1997 |
| 167 | Belize | 14 May 1997 |
| 168 | El Salvador | 11 November 1997 |
| 169 | Haiti | 9 December 1997 |
| 170 | China | 1 January 1998 |
| 171 | Saint Kitts and Nevis | 25 February 1998 |
| 172 | Grenada | 5 March 1998 |
| 173 | Dominica | 29 April 1998 |
| 174 | Gambia | 7 August 1998 |
| 175 | North Korea | 10 August 1998 |
| 176 | Sierra Leone | 21 August 1998 |
| 177 | Iraq | 25 August 1998 |
| 178 | Vanuatu | 6 July 1999 |
| 179 | Kiribati | 30 August 1999 |
| 180 | Tonga | 1 September 1999 |
| 181 | Dominican Republic | 9 May 2002 |
| 182 | Timor-Leste | 3 February 2003 |
| 183 | Antigua and Barbuda | 17 February 2004 |
| 184 | Palau | 24 August 2004 |
| — | Sahrawi Arab Democratic Republic | 15 September 2004 |
| 185 | Montenegro | 11 October 2006 |
| 186 | Monaco | 19 January 2011 |
| 187 | South Sudan | 21 September 2011 |
| 188 | Somalia | 13 March 2012 |
| 189 | North Macedonia | 18 September 2023 |

== Bilateral relations ==
=== Africa ===
| State | Formal relations began | Notes |
|---|---|---|
| Algeria | 10 May 1994 | See Algeria–South Africa relations: Algeria has an embassy in Pretoria.; South Africa has an embassy in Algiers. |
| Angola | 27 May 1994 | See Angola–South Africa relations South Africa relations are quite strong, as the ruling parties in both nations – the African National Congress in South Africa and the MPLA in Angola – fought together during the Angolan Civil War and South African Border War. They fought against UNITA rebels, based in Angola, and the apartheid-era government in South Africa who supported them. Nelson Mandela mediated between the MPLA and UNITA factions during the last years of Angola's civil war.: Angola has an embassy in Pretoria and consulates-general in Cape Town and Johannesburg.; South Africa has an embassy in Luanda. |
| Botswana | 22 June 1994 | See Botswana–South Africa relations: Botswana has a high commission in Pretoria and consulates-general in Cape Town and Johannesburg.; South Africa has a high commission in Gaborone. |
| Egypt | | See Egypt–South Africa relations: Egypt has an embassy in Pretoria.; South Africa has an embassy in Cairo. |
| Eswatini | 1 October 1993 | See Eswatini–South Africa relations: Eswatini has a high commission in Pretoria and a consulate-general in Johannesburg.; South Africa has a high commission in Mbabane. |
| Ghana | 6 May 1994 | See Ghana–South Africa relations: Ghana has a high commission in Pretoria.; South Africa has a high commission in Accra. |
| Kenya | 12 April 1994 | See Kenya–South Africa relations: Kenya has a high commission in Pretoria.; South Africa has a high commission in Nairobi. |
| Lesotho | 21 May 1992 | See Lesotho–South Africa relations: Lesotho has a high commission in Pretoria and consulates-general in Cape Town and Durban and consulates in Klerksdorp and Welkom.; South Africa has a high commission in Maseru. |
| Libya | 10 May 1994 | See Libya–South Africa relations: Libya has an embassy in Pretoria.; South Africa is accredited to Libya from its embassy in Tunis, Tunisia. |
| Madagascar | 27 January 1994 | See Madagascar–South Africa relations: Madagascar has an embassy in Pretoria and a consulate-general in Cape Town.; South Africa has an embassy in Antananarivo. |
| Malawi | 10 September 1967 | See Malawi–South Africa relations Since South Africa and Malawi had their first democratic elections in 1994, Malawi and South Africa have enhanced relations. In 2008, the two governments signed a Memorandum of Understanding designed to enhance the relationship between the two countries through enhanced security cooperation.: Malawi has a high commission in Pretoria and a consulate-general in Johannesburg.; South Africa has a high commission in Lilongwe. |
| Mozambique | 26 September 1993 | See Mozambique–South Africa relations: Mozambique has a high commission in Pretoria and a consulate-general in Johannesburg and consulates in Cape Town, Durban and Nelspruit.; South Africa has a high commission in Maputo. |
| Namibia | 10 May 1994 | See Namibia–South Africa relations Upon independence in 1990, Namibia's economy was still tied to South Africa's. To this day, the economy of Namibia is still closely contacted to South Africa through both institutional relationships (Southern African Customs Union, for example) and privately owned mining concessions. The South African rand is still legal currency within Namibia (while the Namibian dollar is not so in South Africa), and the currencies are traded on par locally.: Namibia has a high commission in Pretoria and a consulate-general in Cape Town.; South Africa has a high commission in Windhoek. |
| Nigeria | 10 May 1994 | See Nigeria–South Africa relations: Nigeria has a high commission in Pretoria and a consulate-general in Johannesburg.; South Africa has a high commission in Abuja and a consulate-general in Lagos. |
| Zambia | 10 May 1994 | See South Africa–Zambia relations: South Africa has a high commission in Lusaka.; Zambia has a high commission in Pretoria |
| Zimbabwe | 29 April 1994 | See South Africa–Zimbabwe relations The Government of Zimbabwe took a particular interest in the search for independence for Namibia (South-West Africa) from South Africa. In addition, as chairman of the front-line states in southern Africa, Zimbabwe spoke out vigorously against the policies of apartheid in South Africa and frequently called for the imposition of economic sanctions against the government. However, whilst supporting democratic change in South Africa, Mugabe did not support the idea of Zimbabwe being used as a base for anti-South African guerrillas. In recent years, following the political crisis in the country, the ex-president Thabo Mbeki mediated with the MDC and Zanu PF to form a unity government, and often remained silent on the issues in Zimbabwe, which drew criticism. Following a cholera outbreak in Zimbabwe, the ruling ANC in South Africa became impatient and has urged the parties to form a unity government.: South Africa has an embassy in Harare.; Zimbabwe has an embassy in Pretoria and a consulate-general in Johannesburg. |

=== Americas ===
| State | Formal relations began | Notes |
|---|---|---|
| Antigua and Barbuda | 26 June 2004 | Both countries have established diplomatic relations.; Both countries are full members of Commonwealth of Nations. |
| Argentina | 10 September 1947 (broke off 22 May 1986, Restored 8 August 1991) | See Argentina–South Africa relations: Diplomatic relations were cut off in May 1986. Full diplomatic relations between both countries were re-established in August 1991.; Argentina has an embassy in Pretoria; South Africa has an embassy in Buenos Aires.; Both countries are members of the Cairns Group.; List of Treaties ruling relations Argentina and South Africa (Argentine Foreign Ministry, in Spanish).; South African Department of Foreign Affairs about relations with Argentina. |
| Belize | 14 May 1997 | Both countries established diplomatic relations on 14 May 1997.; Belize does not have any representation in South Africa.; South Africa is represented in Belize by its High Commission in Kingston, Jamaica. |
| Bolivia | 1967 | See Bolivia–South Africa relations: Bolivia maintains an honorary consulate in Johannesburg.; South Africa is accredited to Bolivia from its embassy in Lima, Peru. |
| Brazil | 28 October 1947 | See Brazil–South Africa relations Brazil has provided military assistance to South Africa in the form of warfare training and logistics. Bilateral relations between the countries have recently increased, as a result of Brazil's new South-South foreign policy aimed to strengthen integration between the major powers of the developing world. |
| Canada | 11 September 1939 | See Canada–South Africa relations Canada established its diplomatic relations with South Africa in 1939, along with other nations, due to the outbreak of World War II. Canada actively encouraged the end of Apartheid in South Africa and the countries have had normal relations since then. The Constitution of South Africa was, in part, inspired by the Constitution of Canada, particularly the Canadian Charter of Rights and Freedoms. Former South African President Nelson Mandela made an official state visit to Canada in September 1998. Mandela was made an honorary Canadian citizen, during his second visit to Canada. A 2003 visit by President Thabo Mbeki in November 2003, the Joint Declaration of Intent was signed to strengthen relations between the two countries. Canada has assisted South Africa in the areas of development (over $200 million) and the fight against AIDS in South Africa and to strengthen services provided by the Government of South Africa. Trade between the two countries totalled $1.8 billion in 2008.: Canada has an high commission in Pretoria.; South Africa has an high commission in Ottawa and a consulate-general in Toronto.; Canada and South Africa are both member states of the Commonwealth of Nations. |
| Cuba | 11 May 1994 | See Cuba–South Africa relations: Cuba has an embassy in Pretoria.; South Africa has an embassy in Havana. |
| Dominica | 29 April 1998 | Both countries are members of the Commonwealth of Nations. Diplomatic relations were established on 29 April 1998. |
| Guyana | 4 November 1994 | Both countries established diplomatic relations on 4 November 1994.; South Africa is represented in Guyana through its High Commission in Kingston, Jamaica. |
| Mexico | 27 October 1993 | See Mexico–South Africa relations There were no official relations between Mexico and South Africa before 1993. After the birth of democracy in South Africa, the countries established relations.: Mexico has an embassy in Pretoria.; South Africa has an embassy in Mexico City. |
| Panama | 10 January 1995 | Both countries established diplomatic relations on 10 January 1995.; Panama opened an embassy in Pretoria in August 2000.; South Africa is represented in Panama through its embassy in Lima, Peru. |
| Trinidad and Tobago | 10 January 1995 | See South Africa-Trinidad and Tobago relations Relations between Trinidad and Tobago and South Africa started after the apartheid ended.: South Africa is accredited to Trinidad and Tobago from its high commission in Kingston, Jamaica.; Trinidad and Tobago has a High Commission in Pretoria |
| United States | 5 November 1929 | See South Africa–United States relations The United States has maintained an official presence in South Africa since 1799, when a US consulate was opened in Cape Town. The US Embassy is located in Pretoria, and consulates general are in Johannesburg, Durban and Cape Town. South Africans and the US also have many non-governmental ties: US missionaries, for example, have a long history of activity in South Africa. South Africans (particularly the ANC leadership) also acknowledge support from and ties to the anti-apartheid movement in the US. |
| Uruguay | 22 April 1968 | See South Africa–Uruguay relations: South Africa is accredited to Uruguay from its embassy in Buenos Aires, Argentina.; Uruguay has an embassy in Pretoria. |

=== Asia ===
| State | Formal relations began | Notes |
|---|---|---|
| Armenia | 23 June 1992 | Diplomatic relations between Armenia and South Africa were established on 23 June 1993.; Armenia is represented in South Africa through its embassy in Cairo, Egypt.; South Africa is represented in Armenia through its embassy in Kyiv, Ukraine. |
| Azerbaijan | 29 April 1992 | See Azerbaijan–South Africa relations: Azerbaijan has an embassy in Pretoria.; South Africa is represented in Azerbaijan through its embassy in Ankara, Turkey. |
| Bangladesh | | See Bangladesh–South Africa relations: Bangladesh has a high commission in Pretoria.; South Africa is accredited to Bangladesh through its high commission in New Delhi, India. |
| China | 1 January 1998 | See China–South Africa relations: Date started: January 1998; China has an embassy in Pretoria.; South Africa has an embassy in Beijing and a consulate-general in both Hong Kong and Shanghai.; Despite Pretoria's long relationship with the government in Taiwan and late recognition of the People's Republic of China (PRC) in 1998 the two countries currently enjoy an increasingly close relationship. Increasingly numerous official visits to each other's countries by their respective officials and rapidly increasing trade between the two countries has drawn them ever increasingly together. |
| India | 22 November 1993 (before from 1 January 1941 to 1 July 1954, when diplomatic relations were broke off) | See India–South Africa relations There is a major resident Indian community in South Africa that made a significant contribution to the struggle for civil rights; Indian leader Mahatma Gandhi pioneered the non-violent civil disobedience in the struggle of Indian people for civil rights in the 1890s and 1900s. Indians also contributed to the African National Congress's struggle against the apartheid regime. The Indian government was an outspoken critic of the apartheid-era South African government, refusing to maintain diplomatic relations. India's support evoked goodwill in South Africa and other African countries. |
| Indonesia | 12 August 1994 | See Indonesia–South Africa relations: Indonesia has an embassy in Pretoria.; South Africa has an embassy in Jakarta. |
| Iran | 10 May 1994 (before from 13 November 1970 to 4 March 1979 were relations at Consulate General level) | See Iran–South Africa relations South Africa and Iran share historical bilateral relations and the latter supported the South African liberation movements. It severed official relations with South Africa in 1979 and imposed a trade boycott in protest against the country's apartheid policies. However, in January 1994, Iran lifted all trade and economic sanctions against South Africa and diplomatic relations were reestablished on 10 May 1994.: Iran has an embassy in Pretoria.; South Africa has an embassy in Tehran. |
| Israel | 29 November 1950 | See Israel–South Africa relations Former ANC leader Nelson Mandela first visited Israel in 1999. Mandela said: "To the many people who have questioned why I came, I say: Israel worked very closely with the apartheid regime. I say: I've made peace with many men who slaughtered our people like animals. Israel cooperated with the apartheid regime, but it did not participate in any atrocities". Then Israeli Deputy Prime Minister Ehud Olmert visited South Africa in 2004, meeting with South African President Thabo Mbeki, the first visit by an Israeli leader since the end of apartheid. |
| Japan | 13 January 1992 (before from 25 January 1937 to 8 December 1941 were diplomatic relations, restored in 1952, but only Consulate General level) | See Japan–South Africa relations: Japan has an embassy in Pretoria.; South Africa has an embassy in Tokyo. |
| North Korea | 10 August 1998 | See North Korea–South Africa relations |
| Pakistan | 23 April 1994 | See Pakistan–South Africa relations |
| Qatar | 10 May 1994 | See Qatar–South Africa relations |
| Saudi Arabia | 1994 | See Saudi Arabia–South Africa relations: Saudi Arabia has an embassy in Pretoria.; South Africa has an embassy in Riyadh. |
| South Korea | 1 December 1992 | See Foreign relations of South Korea: Establishment of diplomatic relations: 1 December 1992. South Korea had previously had diplomatic relations with South Africa from 1961 until 1978, when it severed them after United Nations Security Council Resolution 418, in protest of apartheid. |
| Sri Lanka | 16 September 1994 | See Sri Lanka–South Africa relations: Date started: 12 September 1999 (newly formed); Sri Lanka has a High Commission in Pretoria.; South Africa has a High Commission in Colombo. |
| Taiwan | 26 April 1976 – 31 December 1997 | See South Africa–Taiwan relations: Period of recognition: 1949 – January 1998; Taiwan has a Taipei Liaison Office in Pretoria.; South Africa has a Taiwan Liaison Office in Taipei.; Relations were established between the two countries in 1949 and grew considerably after 1971 until South Africa announced that it would switch recognition from the government in Taipei to the People's Republic of China in December 1996. |
| Turkey | 12 October 1992 | See South Africa–Turkey relations: South Africa has an embassy in Ankara.; Turkey has an embassy in Pretoria.; Trade volume between the two countries was US$1.3 billion in 2019 (South African exports/imports: 757.5/552.5 million USD).; There have been direct flights from Istanbul to Cape Town and Durban since 2015.; 3,600 Turkish citizens reside in South Africa.; Yunus Emre Institute has a local headquarters in Johannesburg. |
| United Arab Emirates | | See South Africa–United Arab Emirates relations: South Africa has an embassy in Abu Dhabi and a consulate-general in Dubai.; United Arab Emirates has an embassy in Pretoria. |

=== Europe ===
| State | Formal relations began | Notes |
|---|---|---|
| Belarus | 4 March 1993 | Belarus has an embassy in Pretoria; South Africa is accredited to Belarus from its embassy in Moscow, Russia. |
| Belgium | 28 August 1933 | Belgium has an embassy in Pretoria and a consulate-general in Cape Town.; South Africa has an embassy in Brussels. |
| Bulgaria | 2 February 1992 | See Bulgaria–South Africa relations Interest Offices between South Africa and Bulgaria were opened initially in November 1990 and full diplomatic relations was established on 2 February 1992.: Bulgaria has an embassy in Pretoria.; South Africa has an embassy in Sofia.; South African Department of Foreign Affairs about relations with Bulgaria. |
| Croatia | | Croatia has an embassy in Pretoria.; South Africa is represented in Croatia by its embassy in Budapest, Hungary. |
| Cyprus | 10 December 1993 | Both countries established diplomatic relations on 10 December 1993.; Cyprus has a High Commission in Pretoria.; South Africa is represented in Cyprus through its embassy in Athens, Greece. |
| Denmark | | See Denmark-South Africa relations: Denmark has an embassy in Pretoria.; South Africa has an embassy in Copenhagen. |
| European Union | | See South Africa–European Union relations: South Africa has strong cultural and historical links to the European Union (EU) (particularly through immigration from the Netherlands, the United Kingdom, Germany, France, and Greece) and the EU is South Africa's biggest investor.; Since the end of South Africa's apartheid, EU – South African relations have flourished and they began a "Strategic Partnership" in 2007. In 1999 the two sides signed a Trade, Development and Cooperation Agreement (TDCA) which entered into force in 2004, with some provisions being applied from 2000. The TDCA covered a wide range of issues from political cooperation, development and the establishment of a free trade area (FTA).; South Africa is the EU's largest trading partner in Southern Africa and has a FTA with the EU. South Africa's main exports to the EU are fuels and mining products (27%), machinery and transport equipment (18%) and other semi-manufactured goods (16%). However they are growing and becoming more diverse. European exports to South Africa are primarily machinery & transport equipment (50%), chemicals (15%) and other semi-machinery (10%). |
| Finland | 15 May 1949 | See Finland–South Africa relations: A South African legation was established in 1967 and relations were then upgraded to ambassadorial level in March 1991. Finland has an embassy in Pretoria, a general consulate in Johannesburg and a consulate in Cape Town. South Africa is accredited to Finland from its embassy in Stockholm, Sweden. During World War II South Africa declared war on Finland. |
| France | 5 November 1934 ( broken diplomatic relations from 23 April 1942 to 13 December 1944) | See France–South Africa relations: France has an embassy in Pretoria and a consulate-general in Cape Town.; South Africa has an embassy in Paris. |
| Germany | 14 August 1951 ( before from 1933 to 6 September 1939 were diplomatic relations) | See Germany–South Africa relations: Germany has an embassy in Pretoria.; South Africa has an embassy in Berlin. |
| Greece | 2 September 1941 | See Greece–South Africa relations: Greece has an embassy in Pretoria and an consulate-general in Cape Town and Johannesburg and an consulate in Durban.; South Africa has an embassy in Athens. |
| Ireland | 5 October 1993 | See Ireland–South Africa relations: Ireland has an embassy in Pretoria.; South Africa has an embassy in Dublin. |
| Italy | 31 October 1929, broken 10 June 1940, restored 18 March 1946 | See Italy–South Africa relations: Italy has an embassy in Pretoria.; South Africa has an embassy in Rome. |
| Montenegro | 11 October 2006 | South Africa recognized Montenegro on 6 July 2006. Both countries established diplomatic relations on 11 October 2006. |
| Netherlands | 15 August 1929 | See Netherlands–South Africa relations: Netherlands has an embassy in Pretoria and a consulate-general in Cape Town.; South Africa has an embassy in The Hague.; South Africa is reluctant to tighten cultural ties with the Netherlands. South Africa rejected several offers of the Netherlands and Belgium to become a member state of the Dutch Language Union.; See also: Dutch immigration to South Africa |
| North Macedonia | 18 September 2023 | Both countries established diplomatic relations in October 1995.; South Africa still uses the name Former Yugoslav Republic of Macedonia (FYROM) in accordance with UN practice.; South Africa is represented in North Macedonia by its embassy in Athens, Greece. |
| Poland | 18 December 1991 | See Poland–South Africa relations: Poland has an embassy in Pretoria.; South Africa has an embassy in Warsaw. |
| Portugal | 1934 | See Portugal–South Africa relations: Portugal has an embassy in Pretoria.; South Africa has an embassy in Lisbon. |
| Russia | 1942 | See Russia–South Africa relations: Russia has an embassy in Pretoria and a consulate-general in Cape Town.; South Africa has an embassy in Moscow.; South African Department of Foreign Affaires about the relation with Russia. |
| Serbia | 4 February 1992 | See Serbia–South Africa relations: Serbia has an embassy in Pretoria.; South Africa is represented in Serbia through its embassy in Athens (Greece). |
| Spain | 18 May 1951 | See South Africa–Spain relations: South Africa has an embassy in Madrid.; Spain has an embassy in Pretoria and a consulate-general in Cape Town. |
| Sweden | | See South Africa–Sweden relations: South Africa has an embassy in Stockholm.; Sweden has an embassy in Pretoria. |
| Switzerland | 14 December 1951 | See South Africa – Switzerland relations: South Africa has an embassy in Bern and a general consulate in Geneva.; Switzerland has an embassy in Pretoria and a general consulate in Cape Town.; South African Department of Foreign Affairs about relations with Switzerland.; Swiss Federal Department of Foreign Affairs about relations with South Africa. |
| Ukraine | 16 March 1992 | See South Africa–Ukraine relations: South Africa established its embassy in Kyiv in October 1992.; Ukraine established its embassy in Pretoria in 1995.; South African Department of Foreign Affairs about relations with Ukraine. |
| United Kingdom | 10 March 1931 | See South Africa–United Kingdom relations South African President Cyril Ramaphosa with British Prime Minister Rishi Sunak in 10 Downing Street, November 2022. South Africa established diplomatic relations with the United Kingdom on 10 March 1931.: South Africa maintains a high commission in London.; The United Kingdom is accredited to South Africa through its high commission in Pretoria.; The UK governed South Africa from 1806 until 1931, when South Africa gained full independence. Both countries share common membership of the Commonwealth, the G20, the International Criminal Court, and the World Trade Organization, as well as the SACUM–UK Economic Partnership Agreement. Bilaterally the two countries have a Development Partnership, and a Double Taxation Convention. |

=== Oceania ===
| State | Formal relations began | Notes |
|---|---|---|
| Australia | 8 May 1946 | See Australia–South Africa relations: Date started: 1947; Australia has a High Commission in Pretoria.; South Africa has a High Commission in Canberra. |
| Nauru | no diplomatic relations | South Africa is in the process of establishing diplomatic relations on a non-residential basis. |
| New Zealand | 19 January 1994 | See New Zealand–South Africa relations: New Zealand has a high commission in Pretoria.; South Africa has a high commission in Wellington. |

== See also ==
- List of diplomatic missions in South Africa
- List of diplomatic missions of South Africa
