= Lars Faaborg-Andersen =

Danish diplomat (1956–2021)

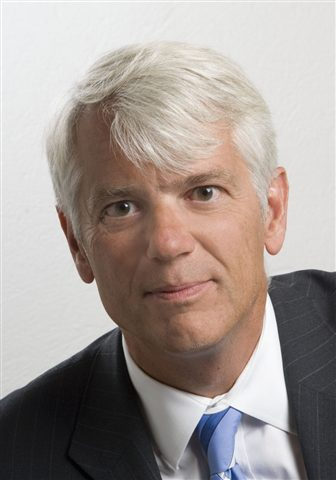
- Ambassador

Head of the Delegation of the EU to the State of Israel, Tel Aviv
- In office 2013–2017

Representative of Denmark to the EU Political and Security Committee, Brussels
- In office 2008–2013

Deputy Permanent Representative of Denmark to the United Nations, New York
- In office 2003–2008

Deputy Head of Mission, Pretoria, South Africa
- In office 1994–1998

Personal details
- Born: June 22, 1956 Nykøbing Falster, Denmark
- Died: June 2, 2021
- Spouse: Jean Marie Murphy
- Children: 2
- Education: University of Copenhagen Columbia University

Lars Faaborg-Andersen RSKmd (22 June 1956 – 2 June 2021) was a Danish diplomat who served as ambassador of the European Union (EU) to Israel from 2013 – 2017. He had a distinguished career spanning over thirty years in the Danish Ministry of Foreign Affairs.

== Diplomatic career ==
Faaborg-Andersen joined the Danish Foreign Service in 1984. He served as deputy head of mission to the Danish Embassy in Pretoria, South Africa (1994 – 1998) and went on to serve as the Ministry's deputy head of Asian affairs (1998 – 2000) and head of Middle East and Latin American affairs (2000 – 2003). During Denmark's 2002 presidency of the Council of the EU, Faaborg-Andersen co-authored the original Roadmap for the Middle East Peace Process (MEPP), eventually approved by the Quartet. He later served as ambassador of Denmark to the United Nations (2003 – 2008) and as ambassador of Denmark to the Political and Security Committee of the EU (2008 – 2013) before being appointed EU ambassador to Israel by High Representative Catherine Ashton in 2013. He concluded his career serving as the Danish ambassador to Portugal.

== Education ==
Faaborg-Andersen received his Master of International Affairs from Columbia University's School of International and Public Affairs (SIPA) in 1982 on a Fulbright scholarship and his Master in Political and Administrative Science (Cand.adm.pol) from the University of Copenhagen in 1984. Faaborg-Andersen is married with two grown children.
