= South Africa–Switzerland relations =

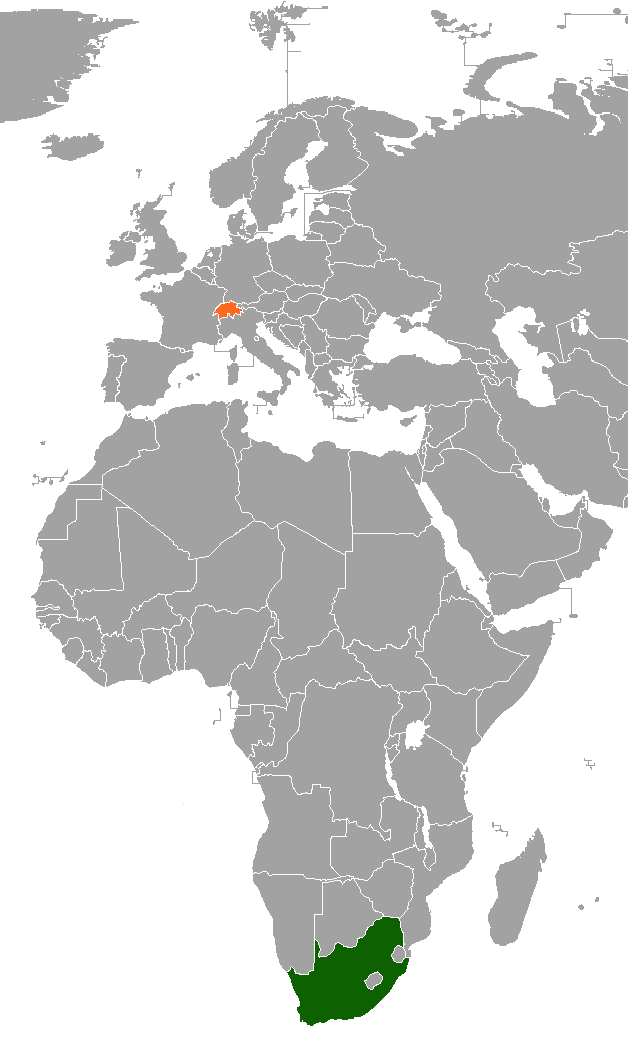
- South Africa: Switzerland

South Africa–Switzerland relations refers to the bilateral ties between the Republic of South Africa and the Swiss Confederation, with collaborative efforts in economic cooperation, education, research, and innovation. Switzerland has an embassy in Pretoria and a consulate general in Cape Town. South Africa maintains an embassy in Bern and a consulate general in Geneva. Annual political meetings are held between the deputy ministers of the two countries to discuss bilateral cooperation.

South Africa is one of Switzerland’s key economic partners in Africa. Switzerland primarily imports precious metals and exports pharmaceuticals, machinery, precision instruments, and watches. More than 100 Swiss companies have subsidiaries or production facilities in South Africa, employing approximately 50,000 people.

== History ==
In 2002, a U.S.-based legal team led by attorney Ed Fagan and coordinated by South African human rights lawyer Dumisa Ntsebeza filed a $50 billion lawsuit in the United States against Swiss banks UBS and Credit Suisse. The suit alleged that the banks continued to conduct business with the apartheid-era South African government in violation of international sanctions, despite Switzerland not participating in the United Nations-led trade embargoes, although it did observe an arms embargo. The banks denied the charges, stating that they had complied with all applicable laws and Swiss government regulations regarding South African business. A United States federal judge later dismissed the claims against UBS and Credit Suisse.

In 2005, a Swiss-government funded study authored by Historian Peter Hug found that the Swiss company Sulzer AG had supplied components used in South Africa's uranium enrichment program, which contributed to the development of nuclear weapons during the 1970s.

In a 2024 Swissinfo report, researchers detailed Switzerland’s economic ties with apartheid-era South Africa. Between 1979 and 1990, Swiss firms made up over 10% of all foreign investment in the country, with companies like Nestlé, Roche, and Brown Boveri operating local facilities that employed around 17,000 people. Swiss banks became major players in the gold trade, importing over half of South Africa’s output by the late 1960s.

== Resident diplomatic missions ==
- South Africa has an embassy in Bern.
- Switzerland has an embassy in Pretoria and a consulate-general in Cape Town.

== See also ==
- Foreign relations of South Africa
- Foreign relations of Switzerland
