= Egypt–South Africa relations =

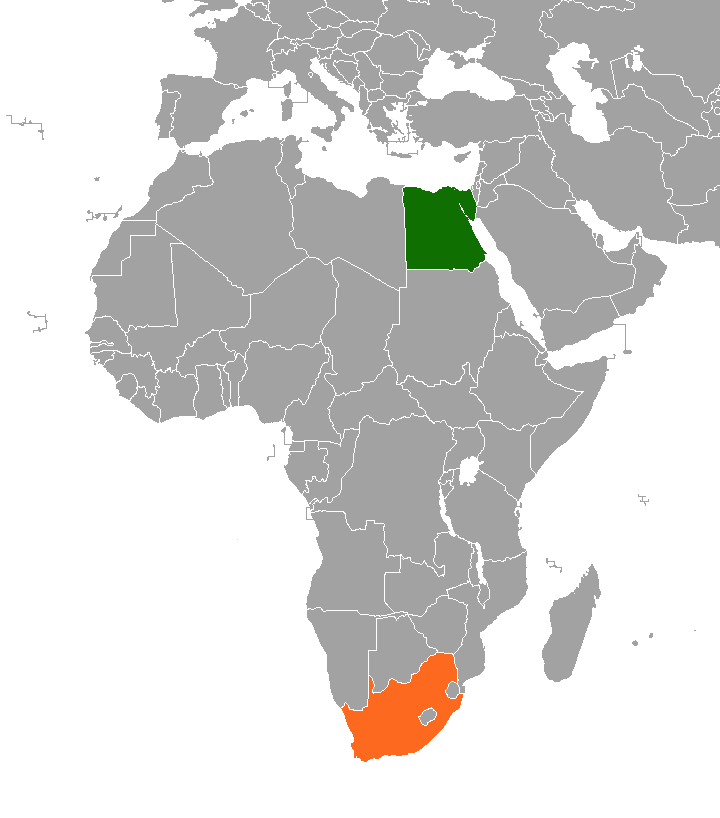
- Egypt: South Africa

Egypt–South Africa relations are the bilateral relations between of Egypt and South Africa. The first South African mission in Egypt was established in 1942 as a Consulate-General. Egypt maintained diplomatic relations with South Africa until 1961.

Egypt enforced all the international sanctions on the South African Government. After 1979, unofficial relations and military tensions were eased. Ambassadors were exchanged only in 1990. Egypt has an embassy in Pretoria and South Africa has an embassy in Cairo. Both countries are full members of the African Union, G-24, Group of 77, Non-Aligned Movement and BRICS (since 2024).

== History ==
Under British colonialism, a project was proposed to connect the capitals of Egypt and South Africa. The first South African Mission in Egypt was established in 1942 during World War II as a Consulate-General, converted to a Legation during 1949. South Africa's recognition of Israel in 1948 angered the Egyptian government, which had fought a war with Israel that year. Relations changed after the 1952 revolution in Egypt, as the Egyptian president Gamal Abdul Nasser began supporting African liberation movements after the Bandung Conference. In 1960, official relations were suspended as Egypt, then a part of the United Arab Republic, supported the anti-apartheid movement. Relations were hostile between the apartheid government and the government of Egypt's president, Gamal Abdul Nasser, as Nasserist ideas were an inspiration to the anti-apartheid movement. Nelson Mandela was personally inspired by Nasserism, seeing it as a model for his party, the African National Congress. Nasser's successor, Anwar Sadat, focused Egyptian foreign policy efforts to the Israeli-Egyptian peace process, allowing the Libyan leader Muammar Gaddafi to substitute Arab support for the anti-apartheid movement. However, Egypt would continue to support the anti-apartheid movement, supporting sanctions on South Africa until the end of apartheid. Hosni Mubarak, the President of Egypt had welcomed the results of the Inauguration of Nelson Mandela on 10 May, following the election back on 27 April 1994 as Freedom Day. Egypt was being among the first country to establish full diplomatic relations with post-apartheid South Africa. Egyptian politician Boutros Boutros-Ghali helped negotiate for the release of Nelson Mandela from prison. Egypt was one of the countries Mandela visited since becoming President of South Africa after the end of apartheid. Today, both countries boast positive bilateral relations, having signed an extradition treaty in 2002, and focused on increasing trade between the two nations. Egypt has also joined BRICS in 2024, an economic relationship between Brazil, Russia, India, China, South Africa, Egypt, Ethiopia, Iran, and the United Arab Emirates.

== See also ==
- Foreign relations of Egypt
- Foreign relations of South Africa
