= North Korea–South Africa relations =

- North Korea: South Africa

North Korea–South Africa relations refers to the bilateral relations between the Democratic People's Republic of Korea (DPRK) and South Africa. North Korea maintains an embassy in Pretoria, while the South African ambassador to China is also accredited to North Korea.

== History ==
North Korea supported the African National Congress, South Africa's current ruling party, in its efforts against apartheid. The North Korean government campaigned against the previous white minority government and provided military training to ANC rebels in camps in Angola.

In August 1998, after the end of apartheid, North Korea and South Africa formally established diplomatic relations. Both countries agreed to maintain non-residential relations at ambassadorial level. North Korea established an embassy in Pretoria, while South Africa accredited its ambassador to China to North Korea.

South Africa has been critical of North Korea's use of nuclear weapons. From 24 to 27 September 2005, Aziz Pahad, Deputy Minister of Foreign Affairs, met with senior North Korean government officials in Pyongyang. This was the first time that a South African government official had travelled to North Korea. Pahad later met with his counterpart, Kim Hyong Jun, in July 2006 to address the missile crisis in the region. In November 2009, South Africa urged the North Korean government to end nuclear tests and resume disarmament negotiations with the United States. In November 2013, Deputy Minister of International Relations Ebrahim Ebrahim undertook an official visit to North Korea.

In December 2015, South Africa expelled a senior North Korean diplomat after he allegedly smuggled a rhino horn out of the country. A delegation of North Korean diplomats, headed by Yong Man-ho, met with ANC officials at the party's 54th elective conference in December 2017.

In April 2020, North Korean state media published a letter that had been sent by supreme leader Kim Jong-Un to South African president Cyril Ramaphosa to commemorate the country's Freedom Day.

== See also ==
- Foreign relations of North Korea
- Foreign relations of South Africa
