= Iran–South Africa relations =

- Iran: South Africa

Iran and South Africa have maintained a historical and current bilateral relationship. South Africa has an embassy in Tehran. Iran has an embassy in Pretoria.

South Africa and Iran share historical bilateral relations and the latter supported the South African liberation movements. It severed official relations with South Africa in 1979 and imposed a trade boycott in protest against the country's apartheid policies. However, in January 1994, Iran lifted all trade and economic sanctions against South Africa and diplomatic relations were reestablished on 10 May 1994. Until then, Switzerland represented South African interests in Iran.

== Economic relations ==
South Africa and Iran share good trade relations, with South African exports increasing by 7 percent from $1.4 billion in 2006 to $1.5 billion in 2007, and imports from Iran, mostly crude oil, increasing by 13.5 percent from $18.3 billion in 2006 to $20.8 billion in 2007. Iran was the largest supplier of crude oil to South Africa in 2007.

Sasol participated in a $900-million polymer joint venture with the Iranian state-owned petrochemicals company, Pars Petrochemicals Company, which produces ethylene as well as high- and low-density polyethylene. The joint venture is known as the Arya Sasol Polymer Company. Iran and South Africa have equally invested 1.35 billion euros in the project. Arya Sasol Petrochemical Complex is among the world's biggest polymer projects. When the complex comes on stream, 400,000 tons of ethylene, 90,000 tons of C3 cut, 300,000 tons of medium and heavy polyethylene, and 300,000 tons of light polyethylene will be added to Iran's petrochemical output. However, due to international sanctions, Sasol sold its stake in 2013 for $238 million, and as of 2015, it has no invested or operating interest in Iran. .

In the 12th meeting of the South Africa–Iran joint commission held in Tehran, Iran 10–11 May the South African Minister of International Relations and Cooperation condemned the imposition of Sanctions against Iran, saying the sanctions are "irrational and illegal". The minister showed interest to improve the trade relations in areas such as education, health, investments, mining, transport, agriculture, science and technology, and energy once the sanctions are lifted.

=== Relations during apartheid ===
Ties between the Iranian government under the Pahlavi dynasty and South Africa's predominantly white government were close during apartheid. After Reza Shah abdicated in 1941, he exiled himself to South Africa then he died there in 1944. His son, Mohammad Reza Pahlavi visited the country during the 1970s where he was received by B J Vorster.

During the Iran–Iraq War, South Africa is believed to have sold defence technology to Iran in exchange for oil.

== Raisi administration ==
In August 2023, a cooperation deal was signed between foreign ministers of Iran–South Africa. Iran reached an agreement with South Africa to develop and equip five refineries in the African state. Under the agreement, the Iranian Oil Ministry will help to develop five refineries in South Africa by exporting technical and engineering services.

== Resident diplomatic missions ==
- Iran has an embassy in Pretoria.
- South Africa has an embassy in Tehran.

== See also ==
- Foreign relations of Iran
- Foreign relations of South Africa
