= Azerbaijan–South Africa relations =

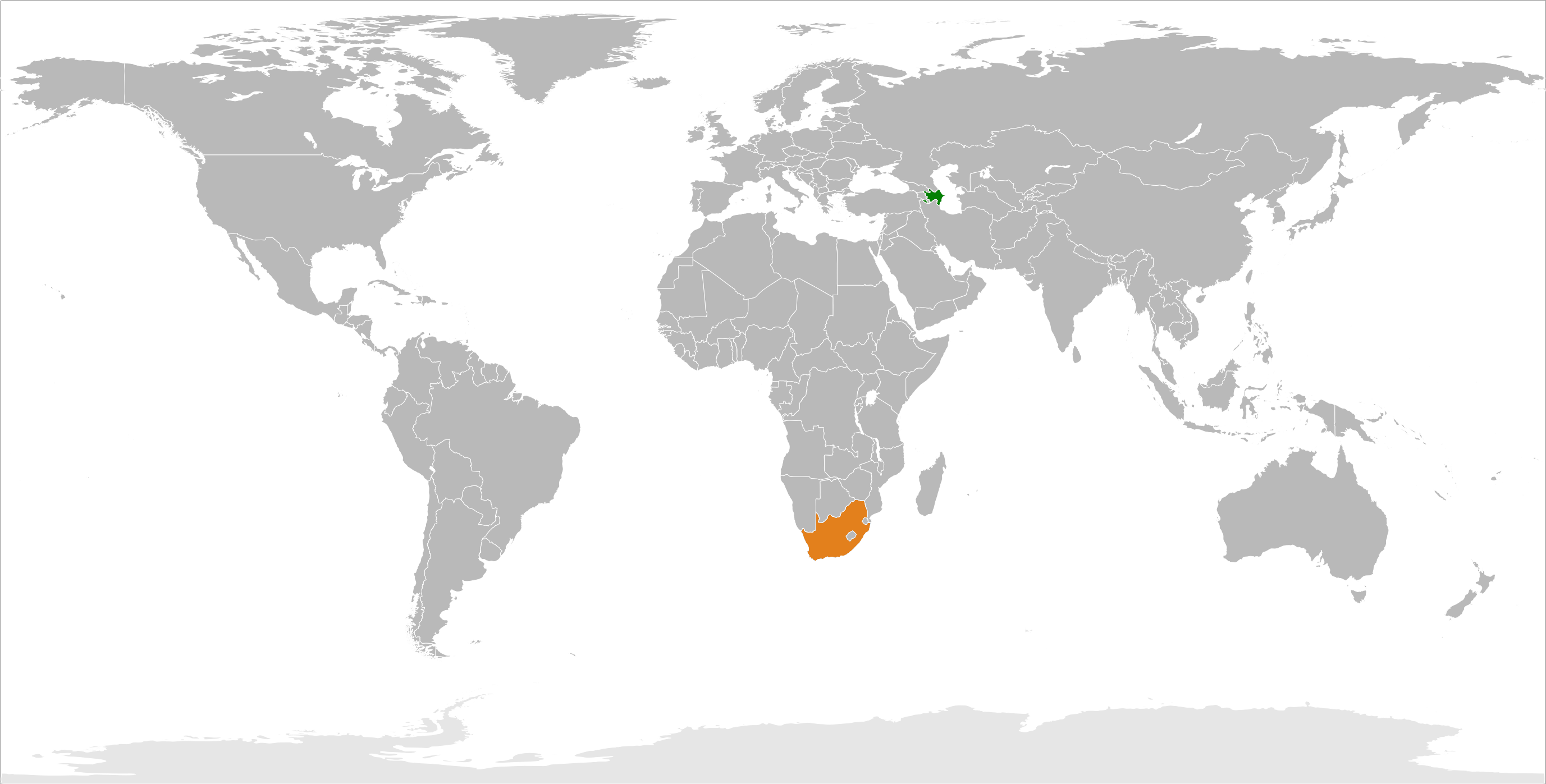

- Azerbaijan: South Africa

Azerbaijan–South Africa relations refer to bilateral relations between Azerbaijan and South Africa.

Cooperation is carried out in such areas as tourism, agriculture, shipbuilding, trade, finance, information and communication technologies, processing industry, military sphere, pharmacology, energy, mining, education, trade, etc.

== Diplomatic relations ==
Diplomatic relations between Azerbaijan and South Africa were established on April 29, 1992.

The diplomatic mission of Azerbaijan to South Africa is located in Pretoria.

Azerbaijan's Extraordinary Ambassador to South Africa is Azad Naghiyev. South Africa's Ambassador to Azerbaijan is Pule Isaako Malefane.

There is a working group on inter-parliamentary relations between Azerbaijan and South Africa. Rasim Musabeyov is the head of the group from the Azerbaijani side.

== High-level visits ==
In May 1999, the Minister of Foreign Affairs of South Africa A. Soaid paid an official visit to Azerbaijan.

In June 2008, a delegation led by the first lady of South Africa, Zanele Mbeki, visited Azerbaijan to participate in the International forum "Expanding the role of women in intercultural dialogue".

In February 2014, MFA Elmar Mammadyarov visited South Africa. During the visit, a "Memorandum of understanding on regular diplomatic consultations between the government of the Republic of Azerbaijan and the government of the Republic of South Africa" was signed.

In November 2016, South African Minister of external relations and cooperation Maite Nkoana-Mashabane paid an official visit to Azerbaijan

On February 26, 2018, a South African delegation led by Pule Malefane visited Azerbaijan. During the visit, the following documents were signed:

1. Memorandum of understanding with the chamber of Commerce and industry of Azerbaijan;
2. Memorandum of understanding with the Azerbaijan export and investment promotion Fund (AZPROMO)

== Economic cooperation ==
According to statistics, in 2017, the trade turnover between the two countries amounted to 7.16 million US dollars.

According to the State Statistics Committee of Azerbaijan, in 2018, the volume of trade turnover between the countries amounted to 162754.2 million US dollars.

In January 2018, at the initiative of the Institute of International Relations of South Africa (SAIIA), an international conference on the topic: "Baku-Tbilisi-Kars railway (BTK) and Africa" was held in Pretoria

The basis of exports from Azerbaijan: kerosene fuel for jet engines, electric motor parts, devices for measuring liquids and gases, etc.

The basis of exports from South Africa: pineapple, avocado, orange, tangerines, grapefruit, grapes, pears and quince, kiwi, peach, plum, fish, wire, wings, chrome ore, gold, other metal structures made of ferrous metals, etc.

Currently, there are 5 South African companies operating in Azerbaijan.

== Cultural relations ==
In 2012, the Central library of the University of Pretoria hosted an exhibition dedicated to Azerbaijan.

In November 2016, a Memorandum of understanding was signed between the leadership of the Diplomatic Academy under the Department of international relations and cooperation of South Africa and ADA University.

There is an organization called "The Friends of Azerbaijan" operates in South Africa.

== International cooperation ==
In the international arena, cooperation between countries is carried out within the framework of various international organizations such as Non-aligned Movement.

The South African government supports and recognizes the territorial integrity of Azerbaijan.

== Other relations ==
In September 2014, an agreement was signed between the South African company Paramount Group and the Azerbaijani company AirTechServices Corporation to establish Paramount Aerospace Azerbaijan in order to modernize helicopters and aircraft

The National Space Agency of South Africa (SANSA) has installed a station for receiving signals from the low-orbit satellites "SPOT 6" and "SPOT 7" (AzerSky)

Azerbaijan television and radio broadcasting (AzTV) and public television of Azerbaijan are cooperating with SABC (South African Broadcasting Corporation).

== Resident diplomatic missions ==
- Azerbaijan has an embassy in Pretoria.
- South Africa is accredited to Azerbaijan from its embassy in Ankara, Turkey.

== See also ==
- Foreign relations of Azerbaijan
- Foreign relations of South Africa
