= Saudi Arabia–South Africa relations =

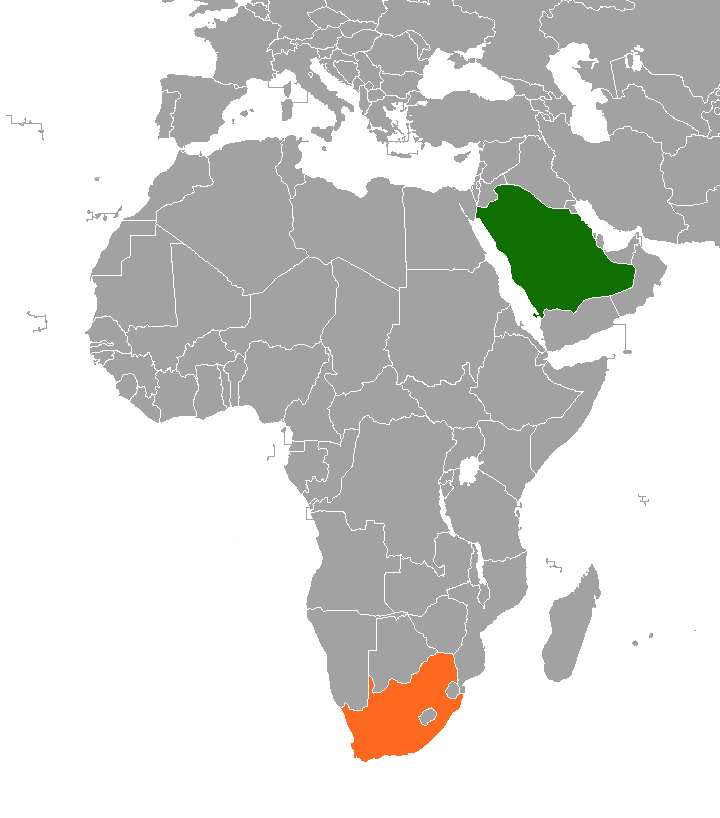
- Saudi Arabia: South Africa

Saudi Arabia–South Africa relations are the bilateral relations between Saudi Arabia and South Africa. Saudi Arabia has an embassy in Pretoria. South Africa has an embassy in Riyadh. Both countries are members of the Non-Aligned Movement and the G20 major economies.

== History ==
Between 1964 and 1970, 2/3 of all of South Africa's oil imports came from Saudi Arabia, Iraq and Qatar. Saudi Arabia opposed Apartheid South Africa's support for Israel and joined an oil embargo of South Africa in 1973. Despite being embargoed, South Africa still managed to get oil from the Persian Gulf from western oil companies in the area not disclosing where the oil was going. In 1975, Saudi Arabia brought together several Muslim organizations in South Africa to form the Islamic Council of South Africa. The ICSA soon joined a 38-nation international Muslim organization. In the 1970s, despite an embargo and generally cold relations, South Africa arms manufacturers sold numerous ground-to-air missile systems of the type of crotale to numerous Arab states including Saudi Arabia. Numerous SA-manufactured weapons found their way to Saudi Arabia along with other goods such as timber and clothing. South Africa would often trade gold bullion for Saudi oil rather than exchange money to avoid the embargo.

On 29 May 1994, diplomatic relations between the two nations were formally established. President Nelson Mandela became the first president of South Africa to visit Saudi Arabia in November 1994. Two missions were established in Saudi Arabia in May 1995. An embassy was established in Riyadh and a consulate in Jeddah. Dr Samuel Motsuenyane became the first South African ambassador to Saudi Arabia in November 1996 and remained ambassador until 2000. The Kingdom of Saudi Arabia opened an embassy in Pretoria in 1997.

In 2012, the fourth session of the South Africa-Saudi Arabia joint economic commission convened to increase total trade between the two countries to 60 billion rand. South African minister Rob Davies and Saudi Minister Minister Tawfig Al-Rabiah, agreed to increase investment and cooperation between both countries in developing infrastructure with a strong focus on shifting from a commodity-based economy to a manufacturing-based economy, a type of economy both countries are trying to transition to.

== Trade ==
In 2019, Saudi Arabia exported US$3.69 billion worth of goods to South Africa while South Africa exported US$829 Million worth of exports to Saudi Arabia, with most exports being minerals.

== Resident diplomatic missions ==
- Saudi Arabia has an embassy in Pretoria.
- South Africa has an embassy in Riyadh.

== See also ==
- Foreign relations of Saudi Arabia
- Foreign relations of South Africa
