= Cuba–South Africa relations =

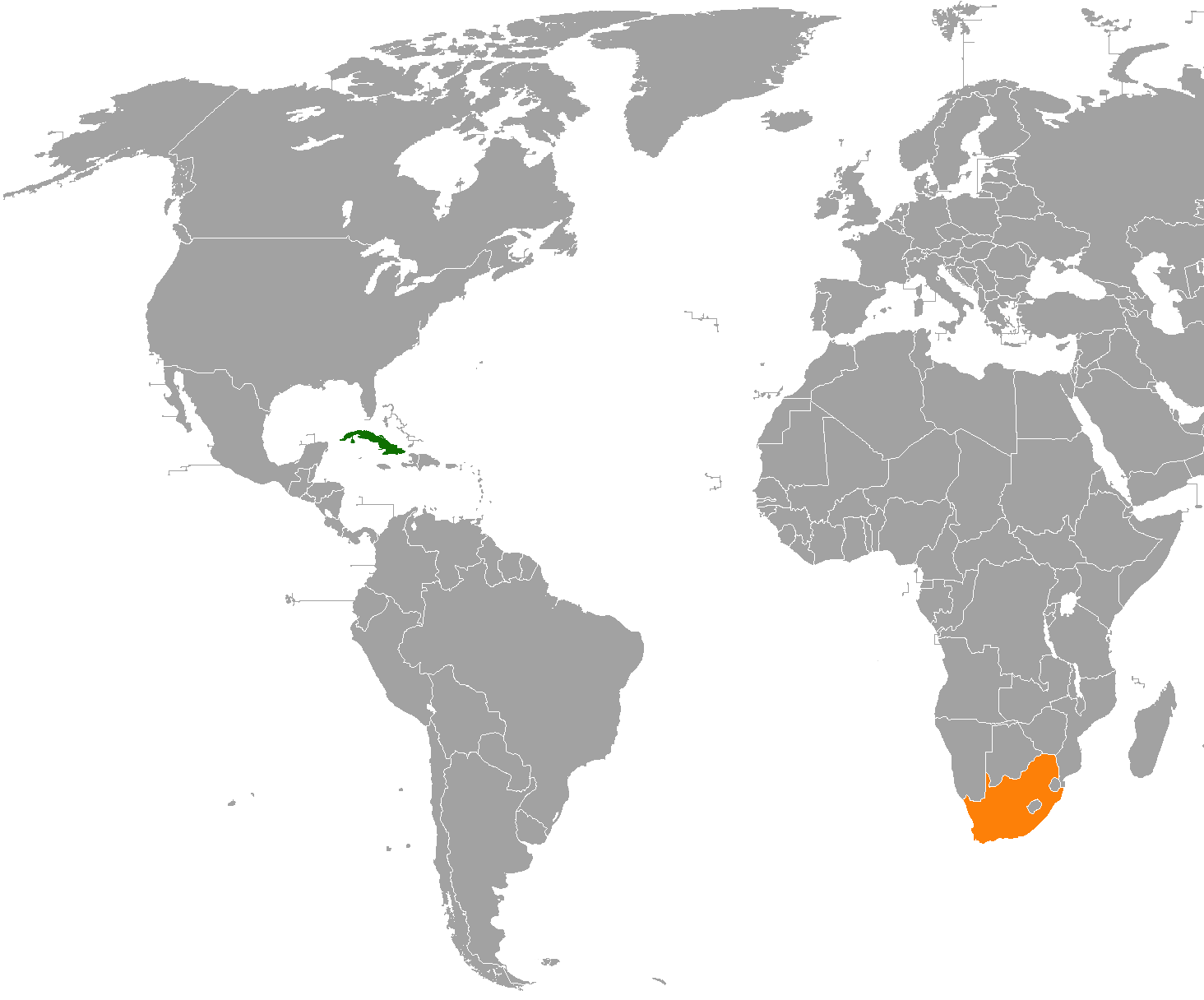

- Cuba: South Africa

Cuba–South Africa relations refer to the bilateral relations between Cuba and South Africa. Relations were strained during the apartheid era. Cuba has an embassy in Pretoria and South Africa has an embassy in Havana.

Since the end of apartheid the South African government has sought to extend significant support to the Cuban government in the form of loans, payment for technical exchanges and advocacy support to end the United States embargo against Cuba. This includes a R84.6 million (US$ 5.46 million) loan in 2021, medical exchanges, contracts to service military equipment, and a R50 million (US$ 3.3 million) food aid donation in 2022 that was later revealed to be R350 million in value. Many of these initiatives have been controversial within South Africa where it has been argued that they divert government resources at high cost from domestic problems such as high rates of unemployment, failing infrastructure, poor quality government service delivery and poverty alleviation.

== Relations during apartheid ==
Cuba condemned the apartheid government in South Africa and demanded the release of Nelson Mandela. The two nations fought against each other in the Angolan Civil War until 1988: the apartheid government of South Africa supported the nominally anti-communist National Union for the Total Independence of Angola (UNITA) and Cuba supported the socialist People's Movement for the Liberation of Angola (MPLA). In 1988, Cuba, Angola and South Africa signed the New York Accords, in terms of which Cuba withdrew its troops from Angola in exchange for South Africa granting independence to Namibia.

== Post-apartheid government exchange ==
=== South African campaign against United States Cuba sanctions ===
In July 2014, the African National Congress (ANC) pledged that South Africa will assist Cuba in its fight to remove United States sanctions.

=== South African foreign assistance to Cuba ===
In 2022 a R50 million donation of food aid was made by the South African government to alleviate food insecurity in Cuba. It was criticised within South Africa for not instead being used to alleviate domestic food insecurity that detractors argued was worse than in Cuba. Criticism of the donation prompted the South African Minister of International Relations and Cooperation, Naledi Pandor, to speculate about what she described as the "mystery" of anti-Cuban sentiment within South Africa.

=== Technical exchanges ===
Since 1996 the South African government has sought to secure the skills of Cuban nationals with certain technical skills from the Cuban government. This practice as drawn controversy over its need given the large number of South Africans already with these skills, skills mismatches, and the cost associated with this practice.

==== Medical exchange ====
South Africa since 1996 South Africa has been a recipient of Cuban medical internationalism. Between 1996 and 2002, more than 450 Cuban doctors and medical lecturers were deployed in South Africa and about a hundred South African students a year are trained in Cuba before finishing their studies in South Africa. Both aspects of the programme have been criticised because of the mismatch between skills needed and taught in Cuba and those in South Africa, the inability of Cuban doctors to speak local languages, and the fact that medical students in Cuba must spend a year learning Spanish and return knowing medical terminology only in Spanish. In 2013, 187 students out 1200 in Cuba went on strike for higher stipends and more variety in meals.

During the COVID-19 pandemic in South Africa the South African government deployed Cuban medical personal across the country to help fight the pandemic at a cost of R429 million. The deployment was controversial with the South African Medical Association, The South African Internationally Trained Health Professionals Association and Democratic Alliance criticising it for not using unemployed South African medical professionals instead. The Daily Maverick questioned the high cost paid for the doctors. The United States government criticised their deployment and payments made for their services as a form of human trafficking whilst the Cuban government rejected allegations of profiting from the deployment of its doctors and stated that criticism was part of a "smear campaign".

==== Water engineering ====
In April 2021 the South African government announced that 24 Cuban water engineers would be contracted to enhance the country's water infrastructure. This was criticised by the trade union Solidarity, South African Institution of Civil Engineering, and academics as unnecessary given the country's already existing engineering skills in building and maintaining water infrastructure.

==== Military support ====
Since 2015 the Cuban technical military mechanics have been deployed to service South African military equipment. The cost of this deployment is estimated to have been at least R1 billion. The cost and use of Cuban nationals has been controversial with both the Democratic Alliance and Freedom Front Plus political parties questioning the practice.

The South African National Defence Force (SANDF) was forced to return 500 000 vials irregularly procured COVID-19 drugs back to Cuba after it was reveled that R228 million (equivalent to US$ 14.9 million) worth of Heberon Alfa R 2b was improperly procured from the country. A total of 970,695 vials were illegally imported and delivered to the SANDF in 2020 with a total value of R229 million (US$ 15 million) as part of more than R 1 billion spent in Operation Thusano. All money spent in the operation was declared "irregular" by the South African Auditor-General.

== Resident diplomatic missions ==
- Cuba has an embassy in Pretoria.
- South Africa has an embassy in Havana.

== See also ==
- Foreign relations of Cuba
- Foreign relations of South Africa
