= Lesotho–South Africa relations =

- Lesotho: South Africa

Lesotho–South Africa relations refers to the current and historical bilateral relations of South Africa and Lesotho. Lesotho, which is surrounded by South Africa, depends on South Africa for most of its economic affairs, and its foreign policy is often aligned with that of Pretoria. Both are member states of the Commonwealth of Nations, African Union, Southern African Customs Union and Southern African Development Community. Lesotho, along with Eswatini, have been described as satellite states of South Africa.

== History ==
The area known as Lesotho is completely surrounded by South Africa. Lesotho (then Basutoland, a British protectorate) was annexed to the Cape Colony in 1871, but became separate again (as a crown colony) in 1884. When the Union of South Africa was formed in 1910, there were moves by the UK to include Lesotho. However, in October 1966, the Kingdom gained full independence. Despite formal independence, the white-controlled government in South Africa played a major role in its neighbour's economic and political affairs, including supporting the government of Lesotho Prime Minister Chief Leabua Jonathan. In 1986, South Africa supported the coup d'état in Lesotho which brought Justin Lekhanya to power. In turn, Lekhanya's government expelled African National Congress members as well as technicians from North Korea, which led to significantly better relations between the two countries.

== Post-apartheid relations ==
South Africa held its first democratic elections in 1994.

In September 1998, South Africa led a military intervention in Lesotho in the name of SADC, after post-election rioting and rumours of a possible coup. SADC troops withdrew from Lesotho in May of the following year.

Since then, South Africa's influence in Lesotho has grown. It is involved with the Lesotho Highlands Water Project, an ongoing water supply and hydro-power project. In August 2010, South African President Jacob Zuma led a group of investors and politicians to Lesotho, where they discussed bilateral cooperation as well as regional political developments. While in Lesotho in 2010, Zuma visited the Katse Dam and addressed a joint session of the Parliament of Lesotho.

== Annexation proposals ==
With decolonisation, Bechuanaland and Basutoland became independent in 1966 as the Republic of Botswana and the Kingdom of Lesotho, respectively. They were followed in 1968 by Swaziland, now known as Eswatini. South Africa hoped to get control of these three states, but the British government had made commitments to respect the interests of the black African inhabitants which would not be kept by handing them over to Apartheid South Africa.

In 2010, trade unionist Vuyani Tyhali started a petition in support of annexation, saying: "We have 30,000 signatures. Lesotho is not just landlocked – it is South Africa-locked. We were a labour reserve for apartheid South Africa. There is no reason for us to exist any longer as a nation with its own currency and army". Ntate Manyanye, a charity director, cited the AIDS epidemic as a reason why Lesotho could no longer survive as an independent country: "Lesotho is fighting for survival. We have a population of about 1.9 million but there may be as many as 400,000 AIDS orphans among us. Life expectancy has fallen to 34. We are desperate".

In 2023, Lesotho's parliament debated demanding the territory of Free State and other Basotho lands from South Africa. This was after, in 2022, Tshepo Lipholo, a member of the Basotho Convention Movement, was elected to Parliament, the only member of the party to be elected. Their platform is based on the idea that the land of the Basotho, the main ethnic group in Lesotho, needs to be returned to the nation, given that it was taken in the 19th century by the Afrikaners. Previous groups had attempted to contact the Queen requesting to make Lesotho a tenth province of South Africa. Many Basotho live in South Africa, and many also depend on South Africa for jobs. However, South African officials said that they would not support the annexation as it was not supported by a majority.
