= Brazil–South Africa relations =

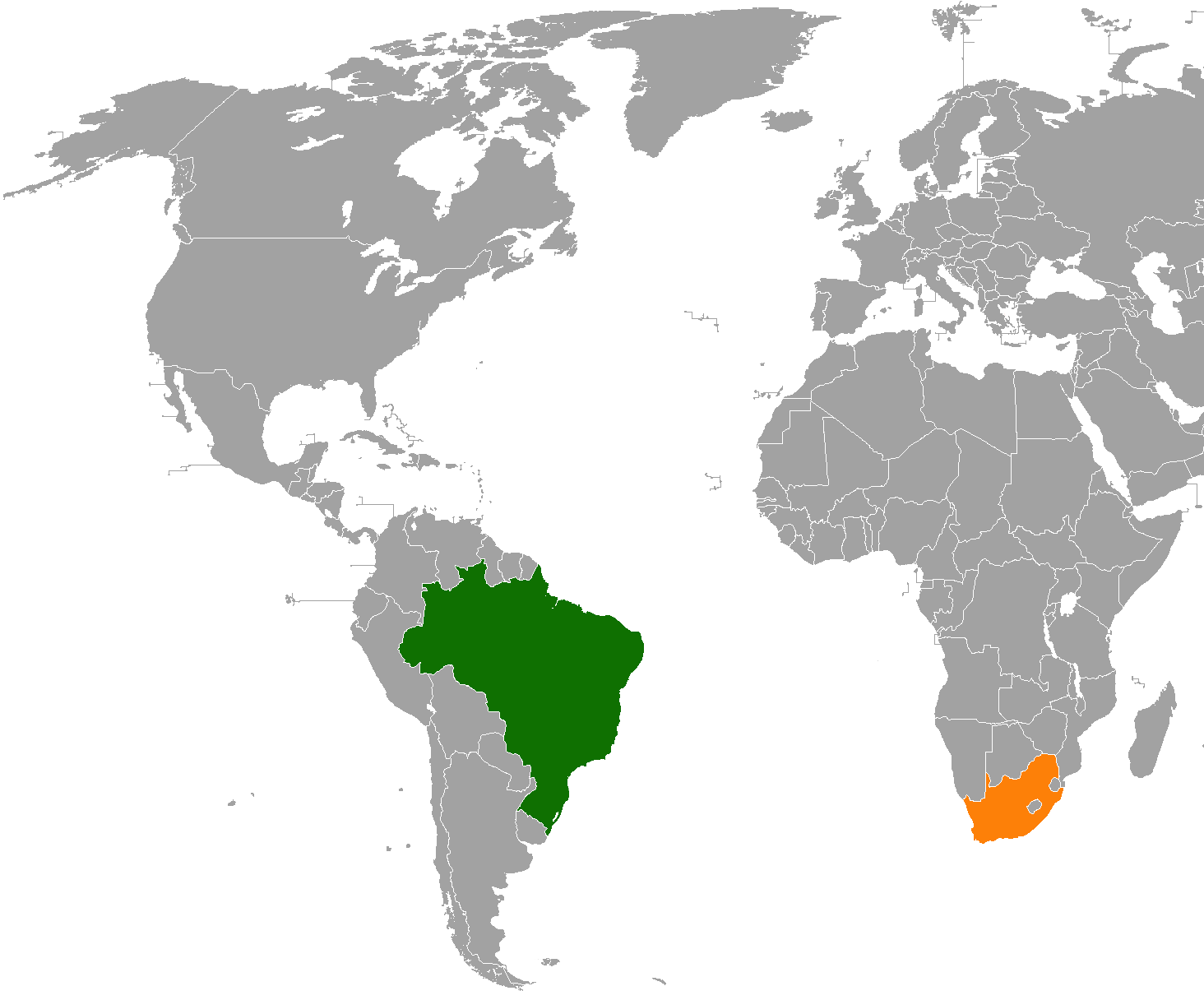
- Brazil: South Africa

Brazil–South Africa relations are the bilateral relations between the Federative Republic of Brazil and the Republic of South Africa. Both nations are members of the BRICS, Cairns Group, G20, Group of 24, Group of 77 and the United Nations.

== History ==
In 1918, Brazil opened a consulate in Cape Town. In January 1948, both nations established diplomatic relations. That same year, Brazil opened a diplomatic legation in Pretoria and South Africa opened a diplomatic legation in Rio de Janeiro. In 1948, the South African government implemented apartheid in the country. In 1971, South Africa upgraded its legation to an embassy based in Brasília. Brazil followed suit in 1974.

In the 1970s, both countries were developing nuclear technology. Both Brazil and South Africa strongly opposed the Non-Proliferation Treaty and both had ambitious nuclear technology development programs. Both nations received assistance from West Germany and were the targets of U.S. nuclear non-proliferation policies and possible sanctions. Despite their many similarities, Brazil’s fundamental opposition to South Africa’s apartheid government, and the South African Border War with Angola (a fellow Portuguese speaking nation); prevented both nations from cooperating in nuclear technology. In May 1979 the government of South Africa opened a communication channel with Brazil through the Brazilian embassy in Bonn, however, political problems, such as the international sanctions against the South African government and its international partners, led West Germany to suspend nuclear cooperation with South Africa and cooperation between Brasília and Pretoria was not established due to the problematic relations between the two countries. In August 1985 Brazil imposed restrictions on relations with South Africa, in repudiation of apartheid.

In August 1991, one year after obtaining his freedom, Nelson Mandela, as President of the African National Congress; paid a six day visit to Brazil and met with Brazilian President Fernando Collor de Mello. In 1992, Brazil began to ease sanctions against South Africa and re-appointed an ambassador to Pretoria. In 1994, all sanctions on South Africa were lifted. In November 1996, Brazilian President Fernando Henrique Cardoso paid an official visit to South Africa, the first by a Brazilian head-of-government. In 1998, Nelson Mandela returned to Brazil as President of South Africa. There would be further high-level visits between leaders of both nations.

Both countries maintain open channels of dialogue in multilateral forums and provide constant mutual support for their candidacies in international organizations. Both nations have an intense bilateral agenda with relation to defense and security cooperation; nuclear energy cooperation; investments and access to markets.

In November 2019, South African President Cyril Ramaphosa paid a visit to Brazil to attend the 11th BRICS summit held in Brasília, and met with Brazilian President Jair Bolsonaro.

== High-level Visits ==
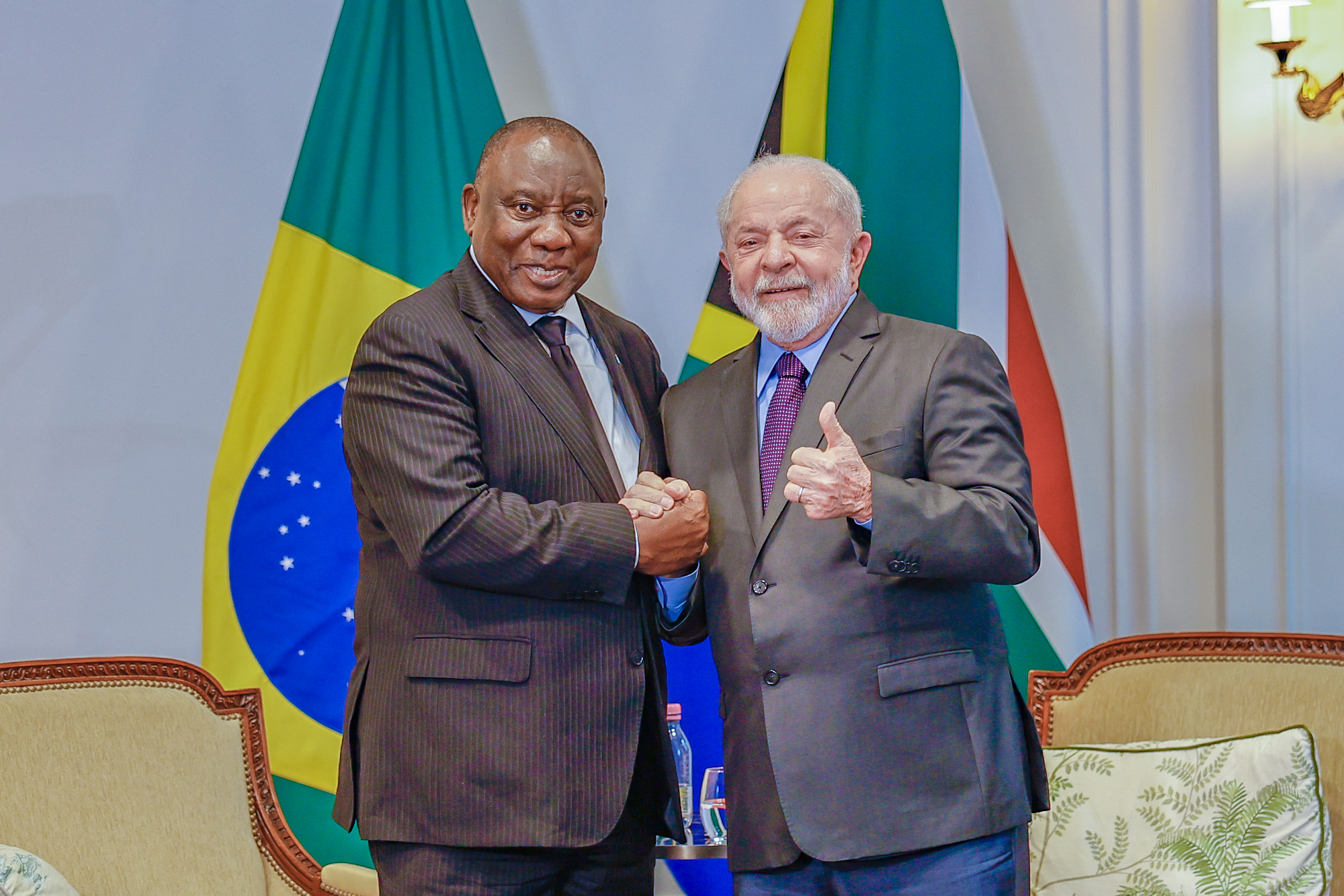
South African President Cyril Ramaphosa and Brazilian President Luiz Inácio Lula da Silva in Paris, France; June 2023.

High-level visits from Brazil to South Africa

- President Fernando Henrique Cardoso (1996)
- Foreign Minister Luiz Felipe Lampreia (2000)
- President Luiz Inácio Lula da Silva (2003, 2007, 2023, 2025)
- Foreign Minister Antonio Patriota (2011)
- President Dilma Rousseff (2011, 2013)
- Foreign Minister Aloysio Nunes (2017)
- President Michel Temer (2018)
- Minister of Defense Fernando Azevedo e Silva (2019)

High-level visits from South Africa to Brazil

- President Nelson Mandela (1991, 1998)
- President Thabo Mbeki (2000)
- President Jacob Zuma (2009, 2010, 2014)
- Foreign Minister Maite Nkoana-Mashabane (2013)
- Foreign Minister Naledi Pandor (2019)
- President Cyril Ramaphosa (2019)
- Foreign Minister Naledi Pandor (2023)

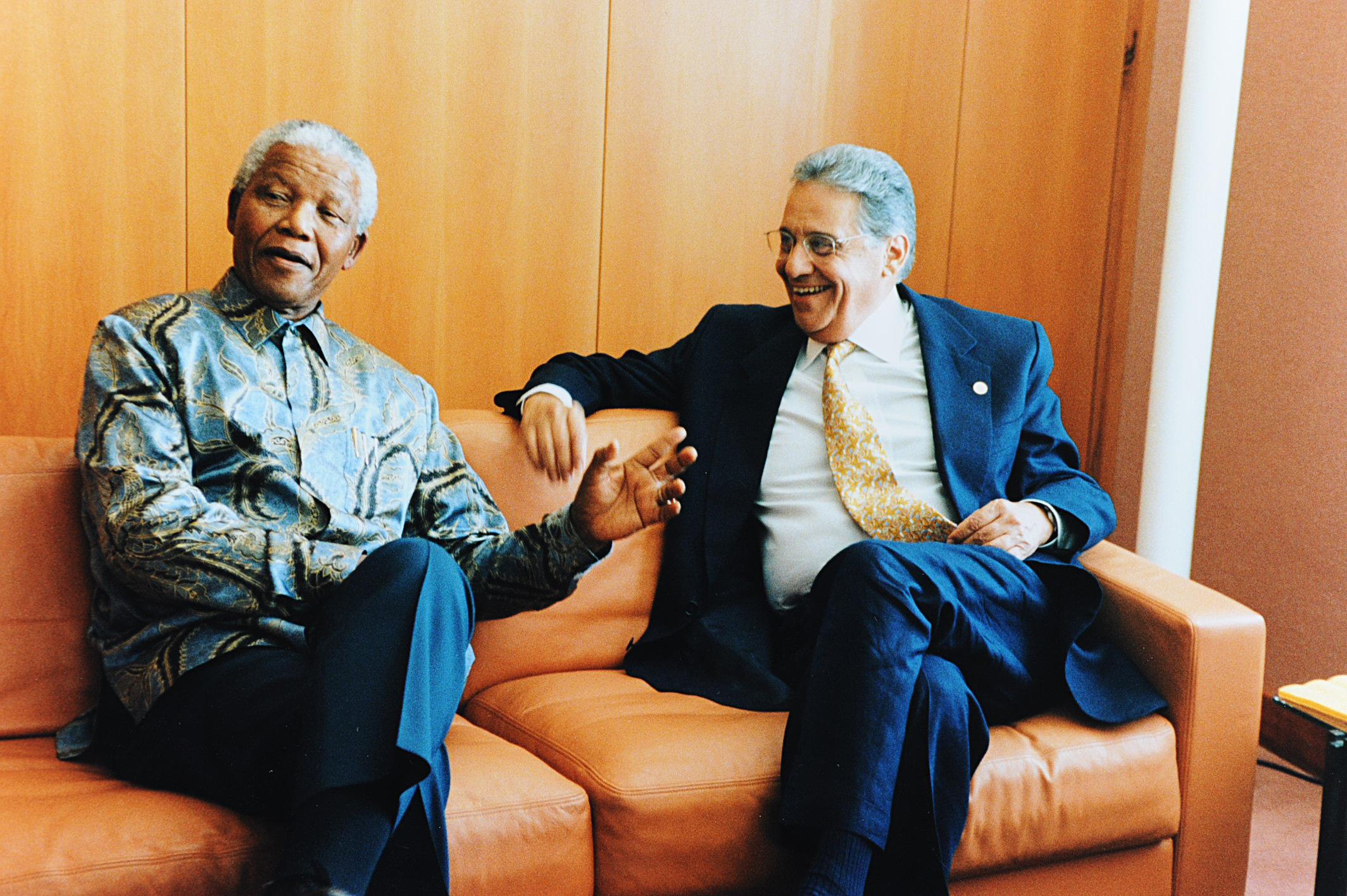
President Nelson Mandela and President Fernando Henrique Cardoso in Geneva, Switzerland; 1998.

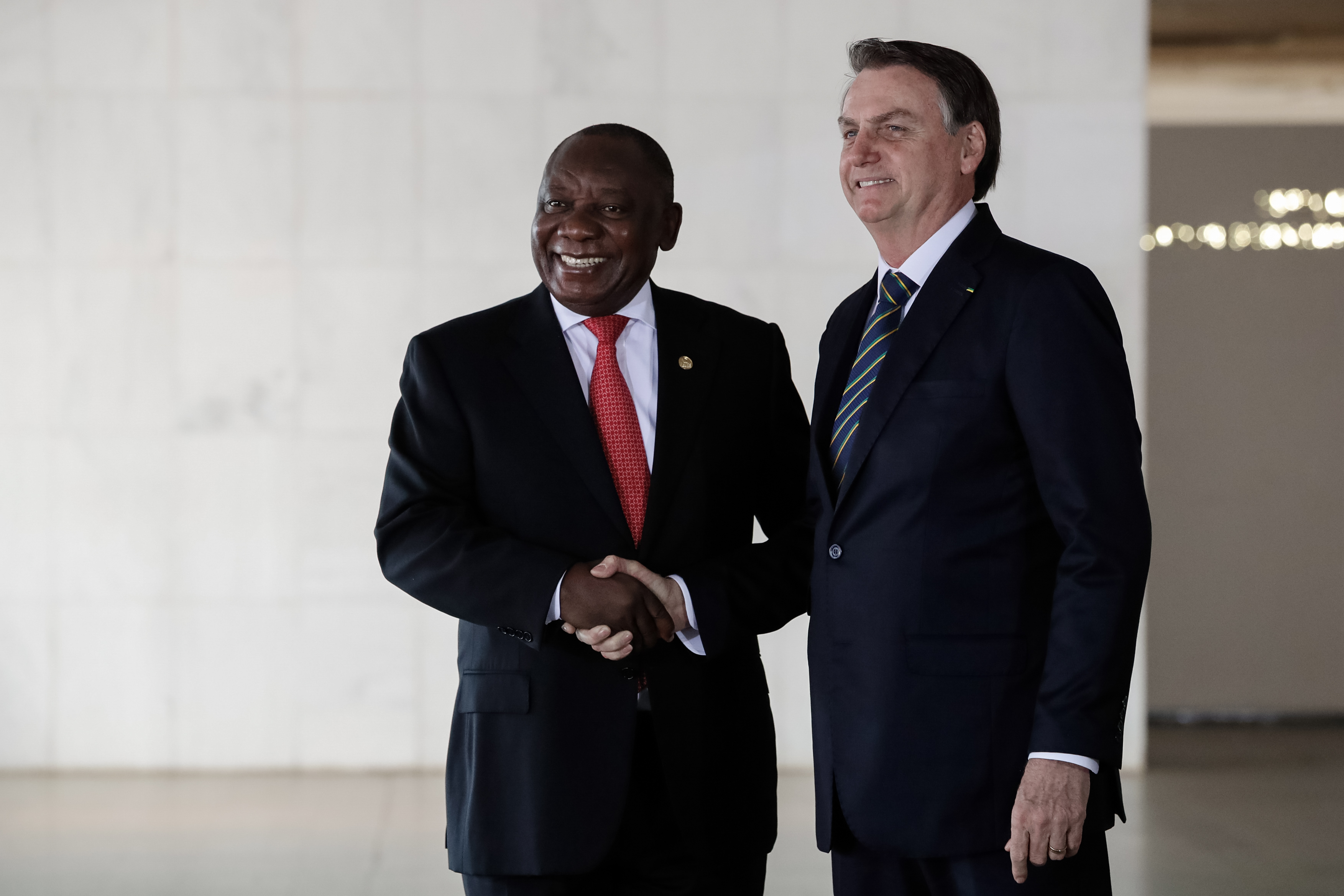
President Jair Bolsonaro and President Cyril Ramaphosa in Brasília; November 2019.

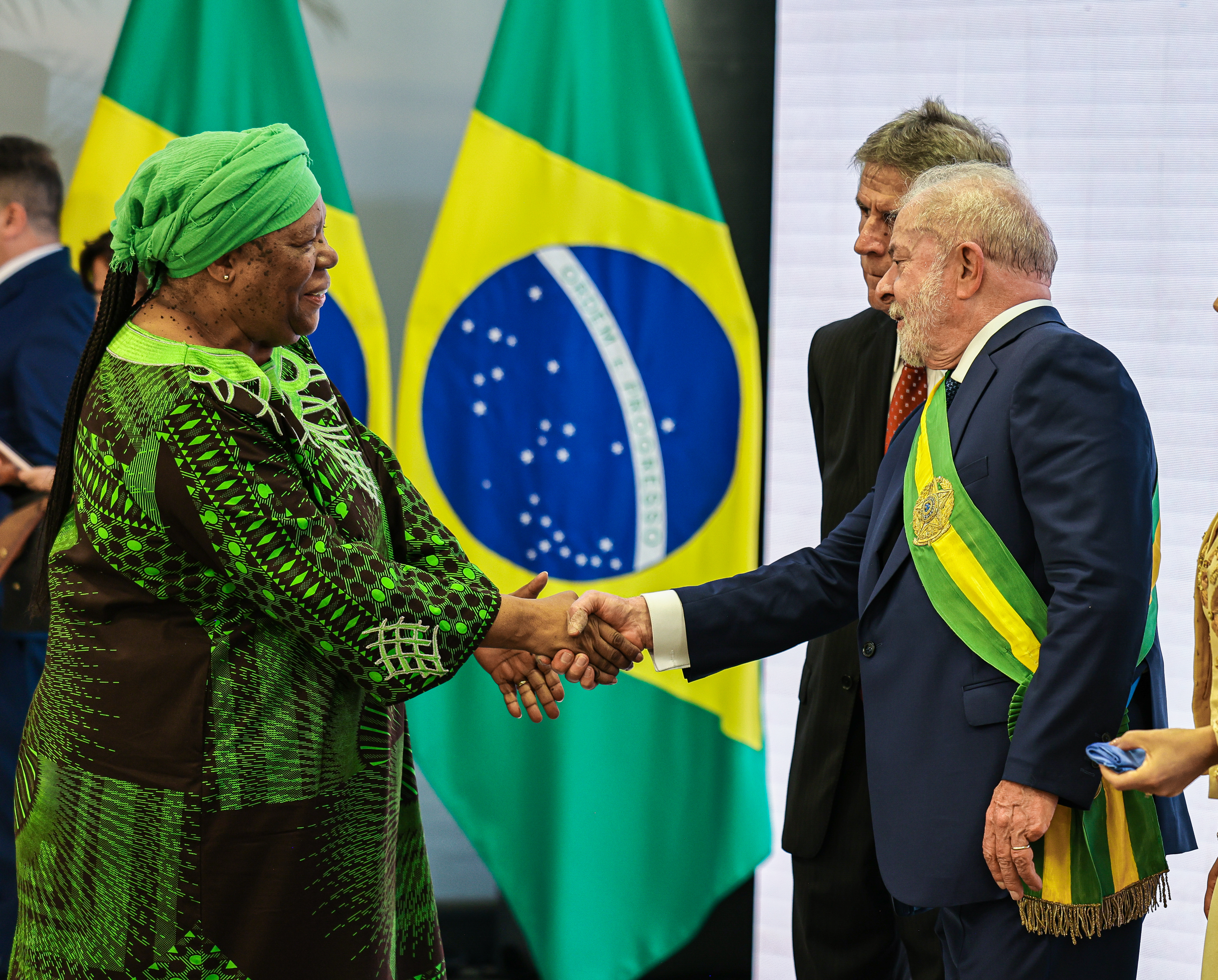
Foreign Minister Naledi Pandor and President Lula da Silva in Brasília; January 2023.

== Bilateral agreements ==
Both nations have signed a few bilateral agreements such as an Agreement in Mutual Assistance between its Customs Administrations (2008); Agreement of Cooperation in Higher Education (2009); Agreement to Avoid Double Taxation and Prevent Tax Evasion in relation to Income Tax (2017); and an Agreement of Preferential Trade between Mercosur (which includes Brazil) and the Southern African Customs Union (SACU) (which includes South Africa) (2019).

== Transportation ==
There are direct flights between Johannesburg and São Paulo with LATAM Brasil and South African Airways.

== Resident diplomatic missions ==
Of Brazil

- Pretoria (Embassy)
- Cape Town (Consulate-General)

Of South Africa

- Brasília (Embassy)
- São Paulo (Consulate-General)

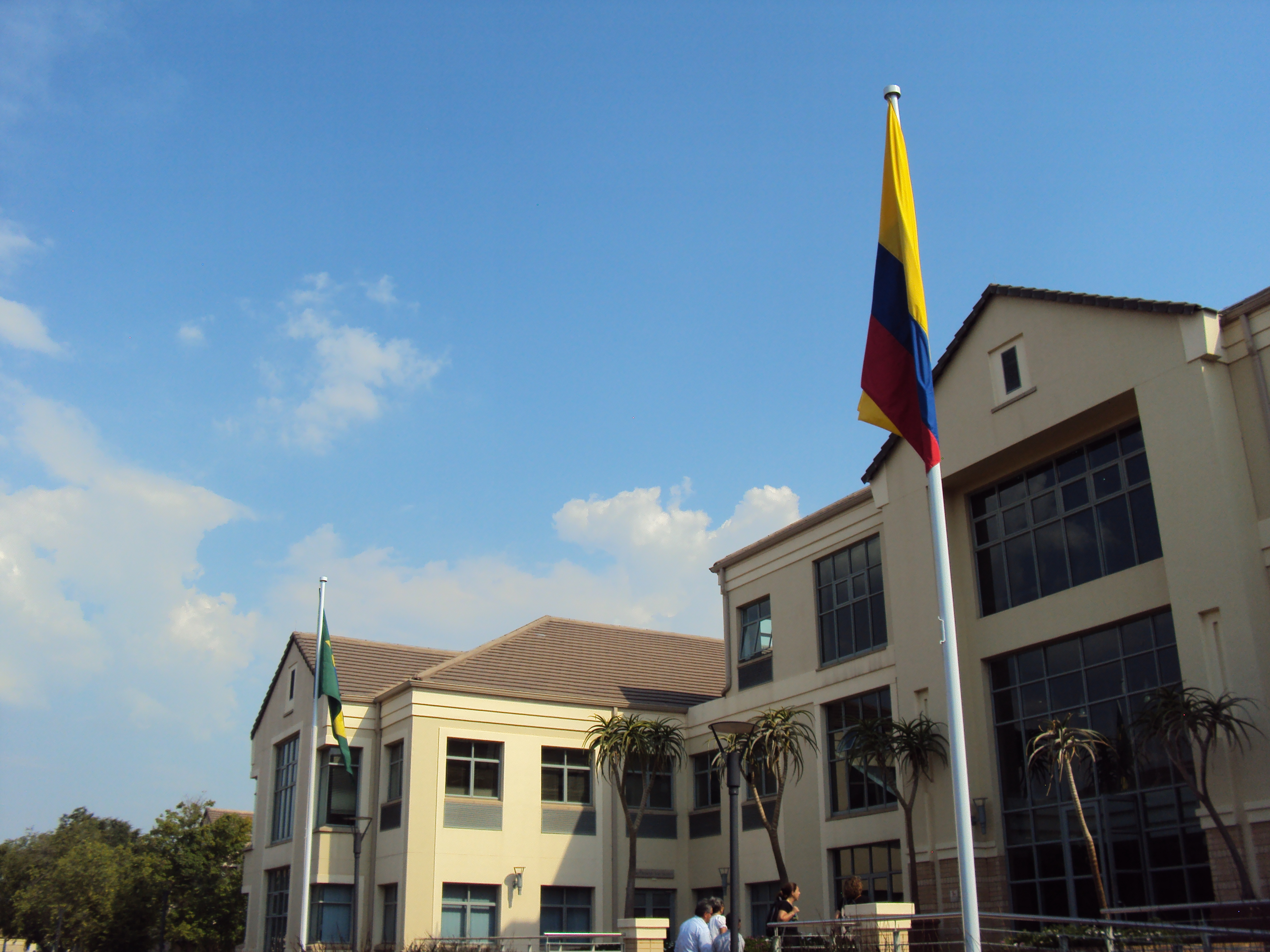
Former building hosting the Embassy of Brazil in Pretoria

Building hosting the Consulate-General of Brazil in Cape Town

== See also ==
- Brazilian diaspora
- South African diaspora
