= Finland–South Africa relations =

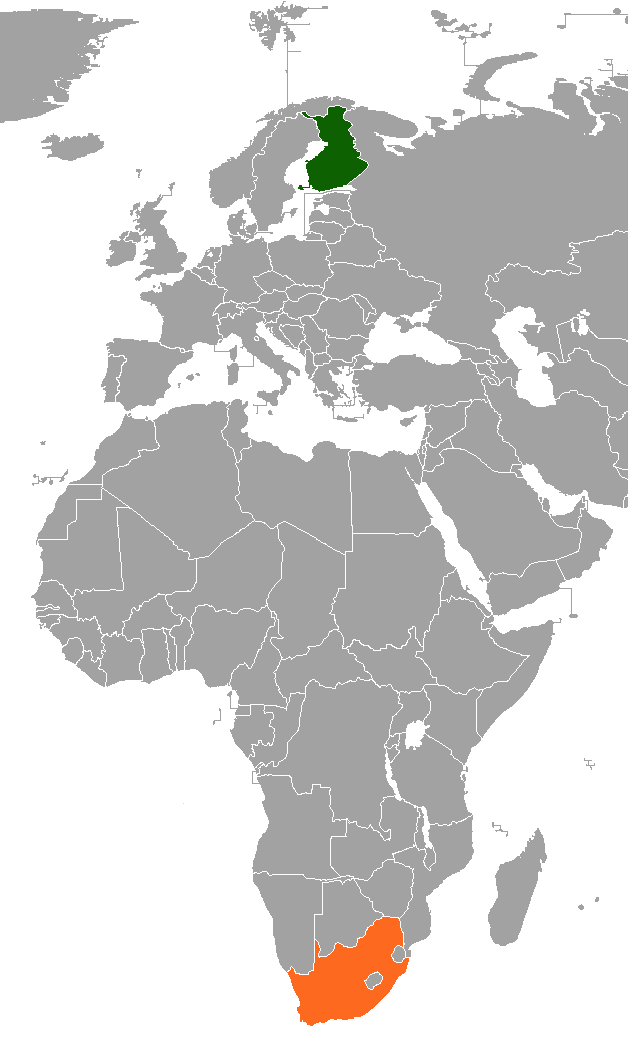
- Finland: South Africa

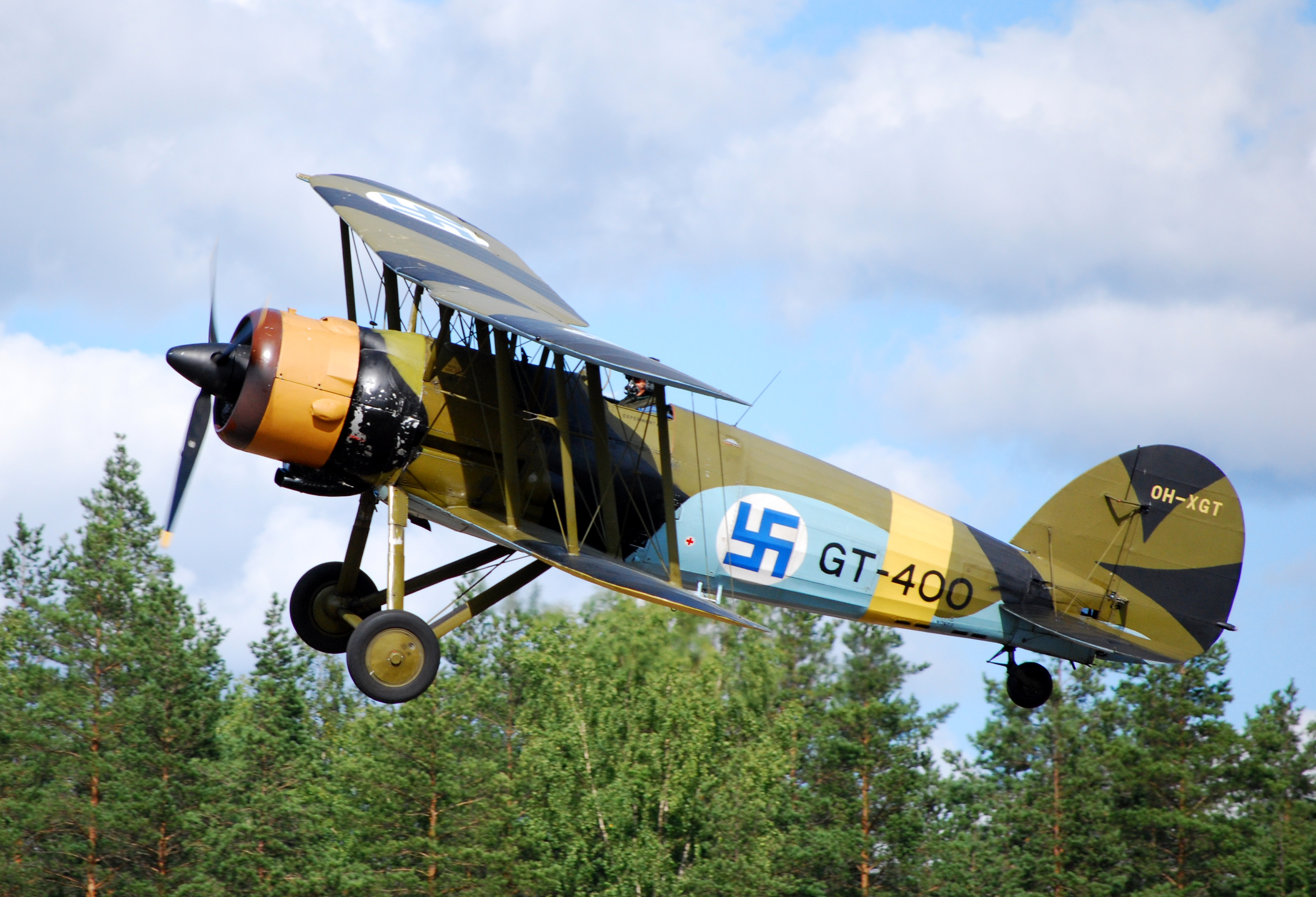
A Finnish Gloster Gauntlet Mk. II (OH-XGT). South Africa donated 24 such aircraft to Finland during the Winter War.

Finland–South Africa relations are foreign relations between Finland and South Africa. Diplomatic relations established May 15, 1949. A South African legation was established in 1967 and relations were then upgraded to ambassadorial level in March 1991. Finland has an embassy in Pretoria, a general consulate in Johannesburg and a consulate in Cape Town. South Africa is accredited to Finland from its embassy in Stockholm, Sweden.

South Africa supported Finland during the Winter War and supplied 25 Gloster Gauntlets to the Finnish air force. During World War II South Africa, along with other Commonwealth nations, declared war on Finland.

Finland was critical of South Africa's official policy of neutrality following Russia's 2022 invasion of Ukraine and called for South Africa to support Ukraine.

President of the Republic of Finland, Sauli Niinistö, made an official visit to South Africa on 25–26 April 2023. On 25 April, President Niinistö met with President of the Republic of South Africa, Cyril Ramaphosa, in Pretoria.

== Agreements ==
In 2008 South Africa and Finland signed a cooperation agreement to support biosciences projects in the Southern African Development Community.

== Apartheid ==
Finland was a strong supporter of the dismantling of Apartheid in South Africa.

== Trade ==
Between 1925 and 1939, Finland was the largest source of imported timber for South Africa.

South Africa exports to Finland fresh and dried fruits, wine, pulp, paper, iron, steel and coal. South Africa imports telecommunication equipment, paper, board products, and machinery from Finland.

== Resident diplomatic missions ==
- Finland has an embassy in Pretoria.
- South Africa is accredited to Finland from its embassy in Stockholm, Sweden.

== See also ==
- Foreign relations of Finland
- Foreign relations of South Africa
