= Bulgaria–South Africa relations =

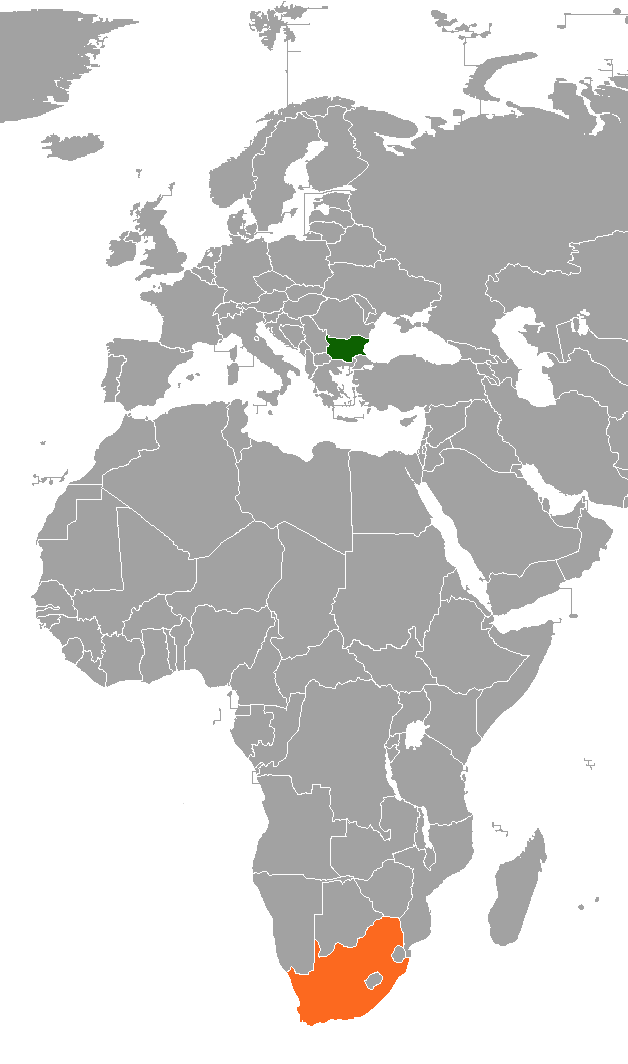

- Bulgaria: South Africa

Bulgaria–South Africa relations are foreign relations between Bulgaria and South Africa. Interest Offices between South Africa and Bulgaria were opened initially in November 1990 and full diplomatic relations was established on February 2, 1992.

== Resident diplomatic missions ==
- Bulgaria has an embassy in Pretoria.
- South Africa has an embassy in Sofia.

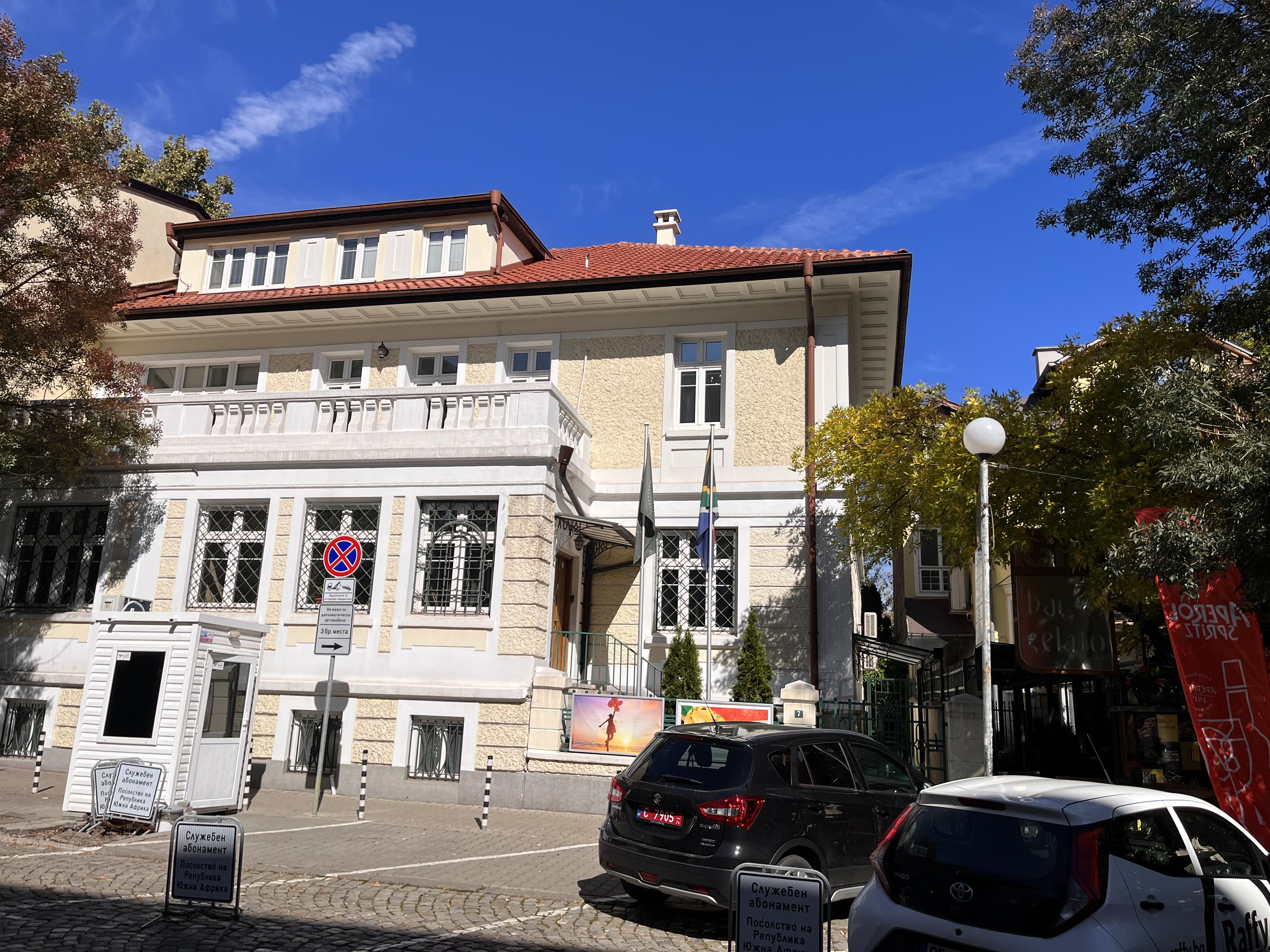
Embassy of South Africa in Sofia

== See also ==
- Foreign relations of Bulgaria
- Foreign relations of South Africa
