= South Africa–Sri Lanka relations =

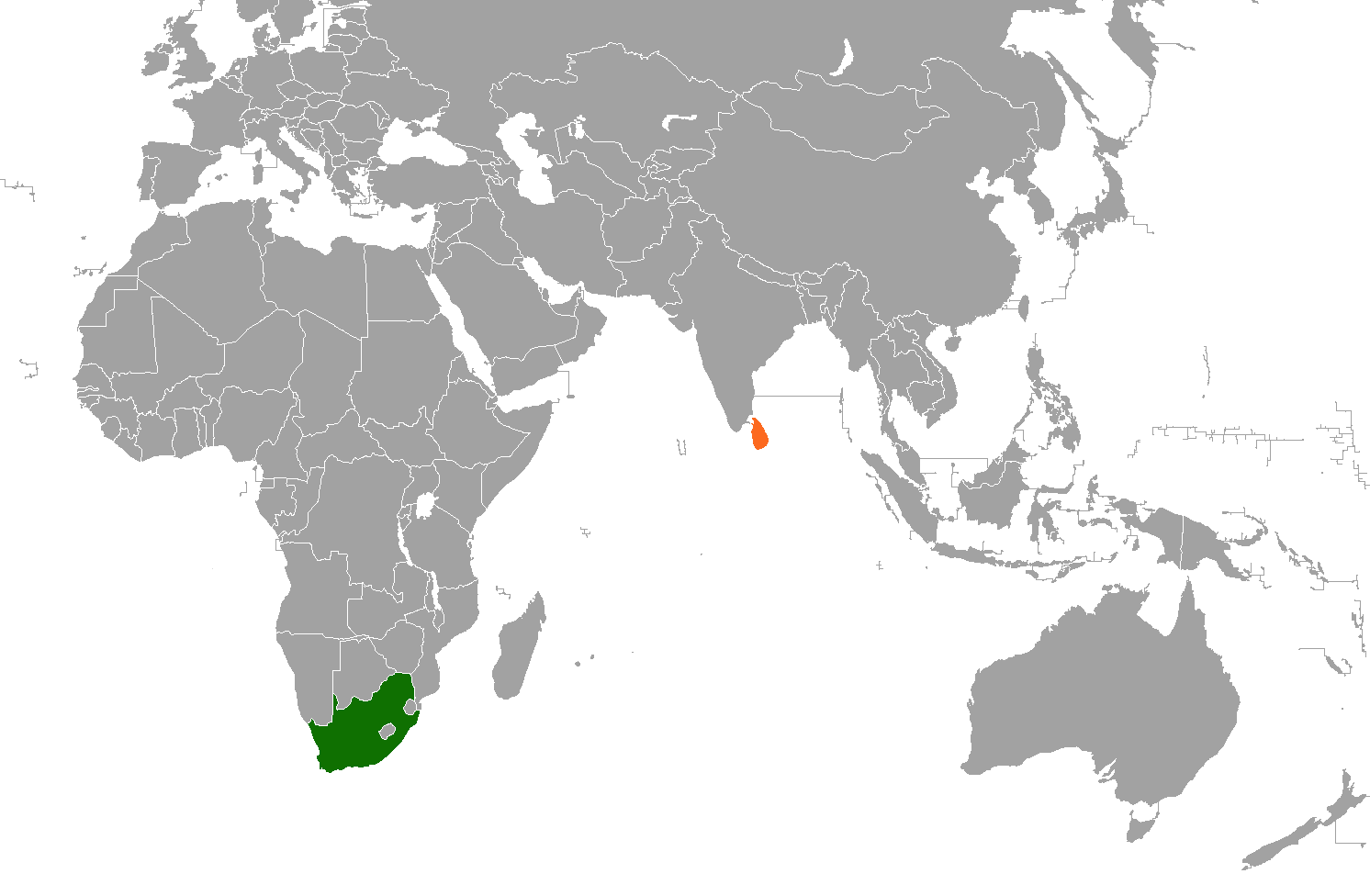

- South Africa: Sri Lanka

South Africa–Sri Lanka relations refers to the current and historical relations between South Africa and Sri Lanka. The Government of South Africa established its resident diplomatic mission in Colombo in September 2007. HE Sirisena Amarasekara is the current Sri Lankan High Commissioner to South Africa while HE Ms RP Marks is the current South African High Commissioner to Sri Lanka. Both countries are members of the Commonwealth of Nations.

== History ==
Both countries of South Africa and Sri Lanka were part of the Dutch and British Empires. Sri Lanka (then Ceylon) was a Dutch colony from 1658 - 1796 and a British colony from 1815 - 1948 while South Africa (mainly the Dutch Cape colony) was a Dutch colony from 1652 - 1806 and a British colony (including other parts of South Africa) from 1806 - 1910. The relations of both South Africa and Ceylon would have happened during the two periods of colonialism.

Slaves from the East Indies and the Indian Subcontinent were frequently routed through Ceylon(Sri Lanka). During the 17th and 18th centuries, coastal areas of Ceylon was under Dutch colonial rule.

Sri Lanka established diplomatic relations on 12 September 1994 following the end of Apartheid and the election of Nelson Mandela to the new Government of South Africa of its post Apartheid period.

== High level visits ==
The President of South Africa, Jacob Zuma, visited Sri Lanka to participate in the Commonwealth Heads of Government Meeting 2013 in Colombo. The President of Sri Lanka Mahinda Rajapaksa, visited South Africa in December 2013 to participate in the funeral of former President of South Africa Nelson Mandela.
