= France–South Africa relations =

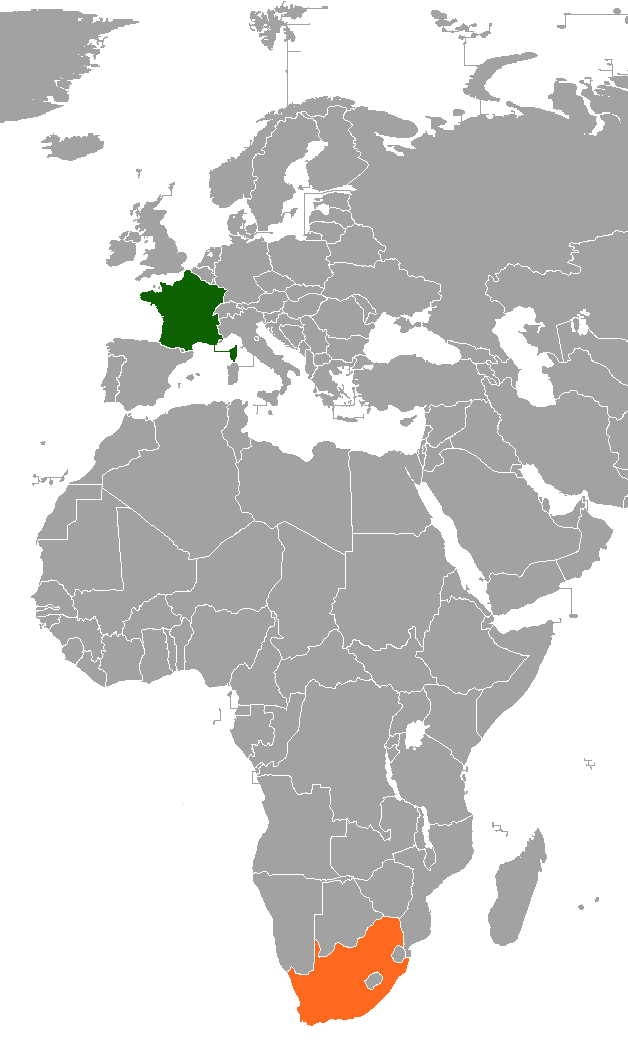
- France: South Africa

France–South Africa relations are the diplomatic relations between France and South Africa. Between 1961 and 1974, France was South Africa's largest supplier of weaponry. Both nations are members of the G-20 major economies and the United Nations. The two states have strong economic ties; France was South Africa's 9th largest importer as of 2015.

== History ==
France already maintained strong ties to South Africa during the apartheid era, becoming the foremost arms exporter to the regime from the 1960s onwards. As the international pressure to sanction and disinvest from South Africa increased, France continued these exports, but sought more covert ways to do so (namely outsourcing its weapons production to South Africa and using third-party countries that had secret agreements with the South Africans). It also provided substantial assistance to the nuclear research and weapons programme of South Africa throughout the 1960s and 1970s.

France cut off diplomatic relations with South Africa in 1981 and restored relations in 1992. More recently, France has responded to its diminishing influence in Francophone Africa by strengthening economic ties with African Anglophone nations, particularly Nigeria and South Africa, which became France's largest trading partners in Africa.

== Resident diplomatic missions ==
- France has an embassy in Pretoria and consulates-general in Cape Town and Johannesburg.
- South Africa has an embassy in Paris.
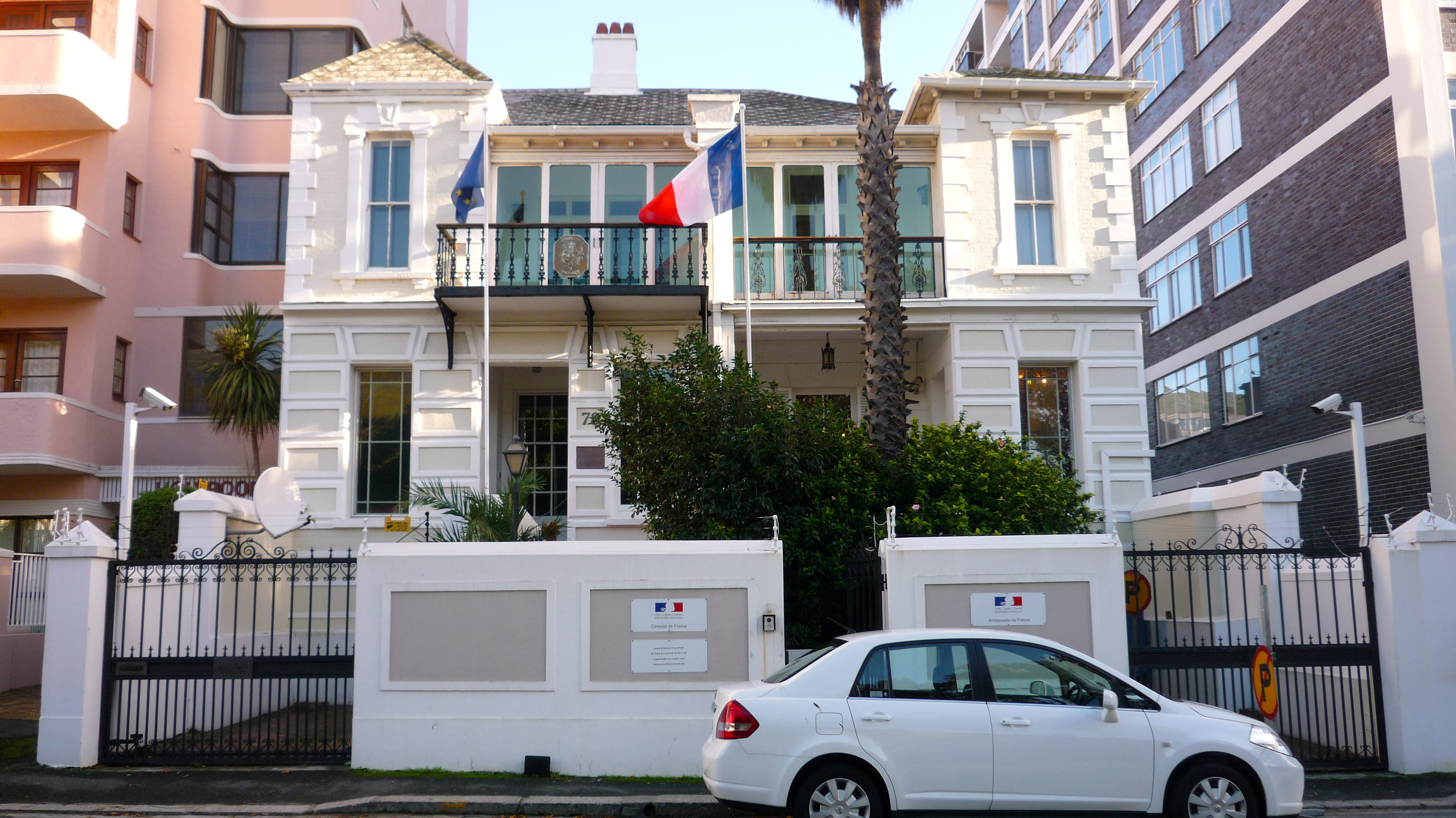
Consulate-General of France in Cape Town

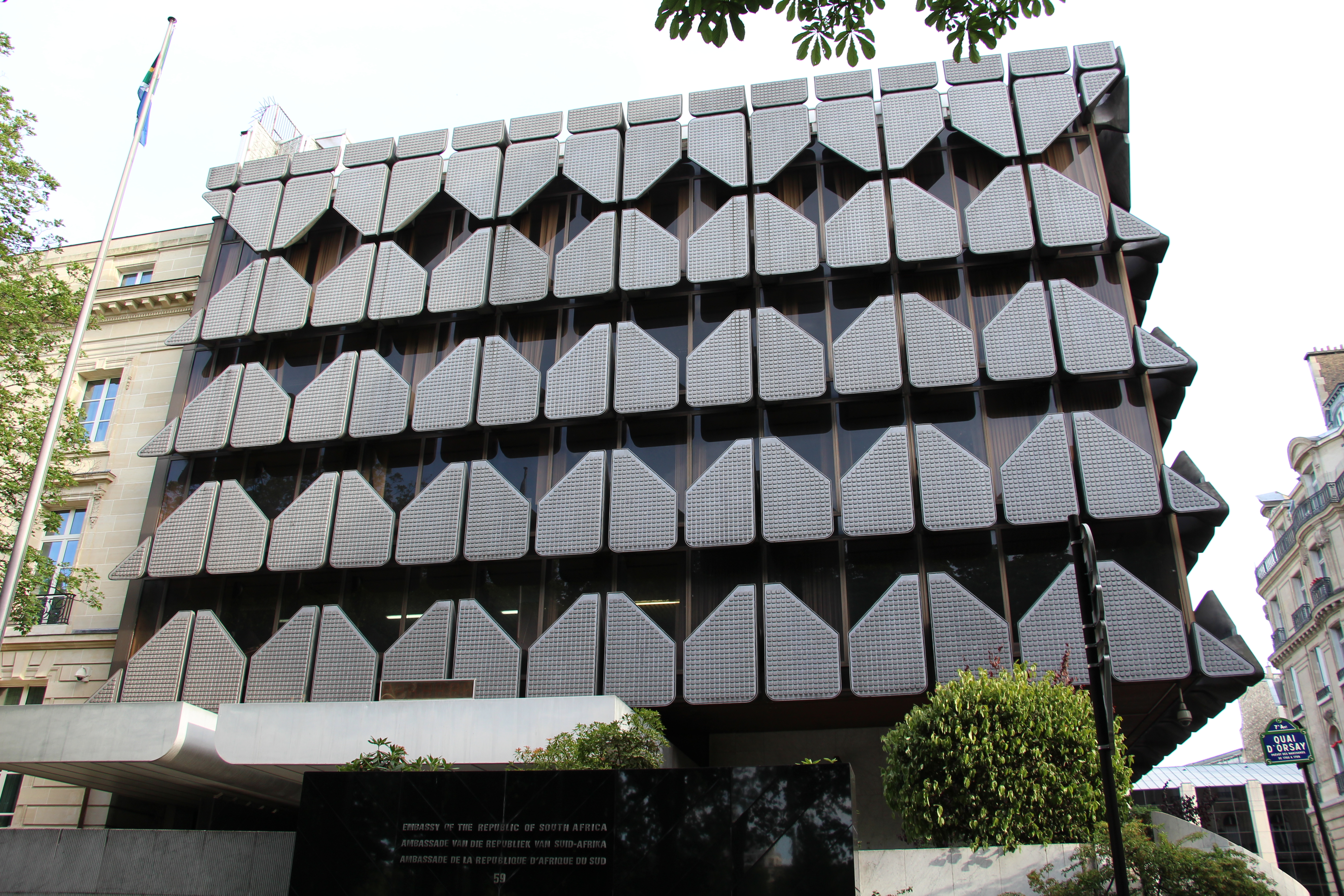
Embassy of South Africa in Paris

== See also ==
- Foreign relations of France
- Foreign relations of South Africa
