= Denmark–South Africa relations =

Coordinates: 55.7234°N 12.5720°E

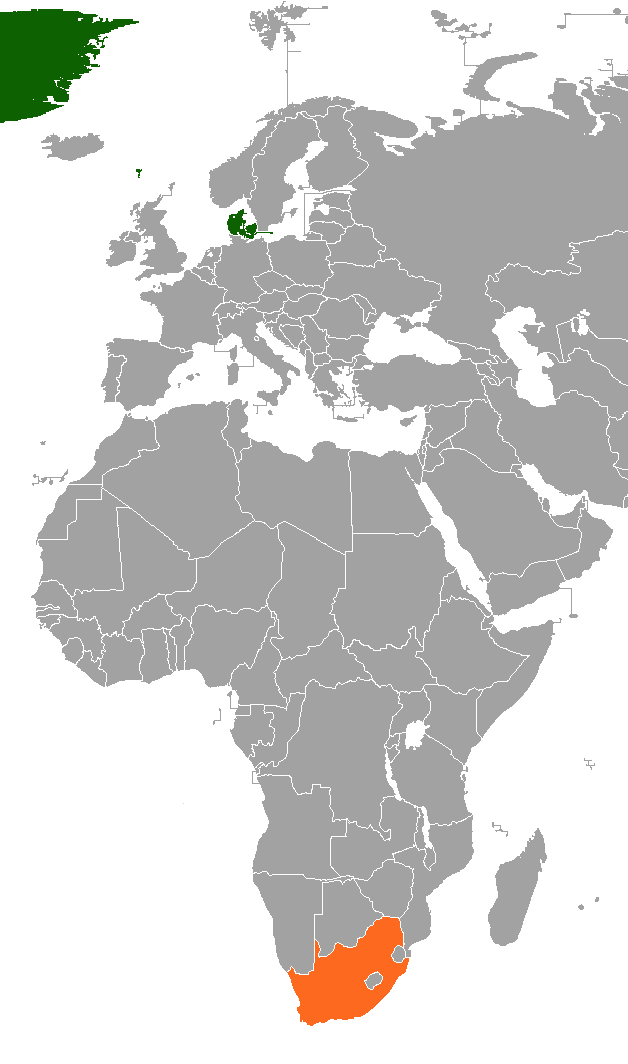
- Denmark: South Africa

Denmark–South Africa relations refers to the bilateral relations between Denmark and South Africa. Denmark has an embassy in Pretoria and South Africa has an embassy in Copenhagen.

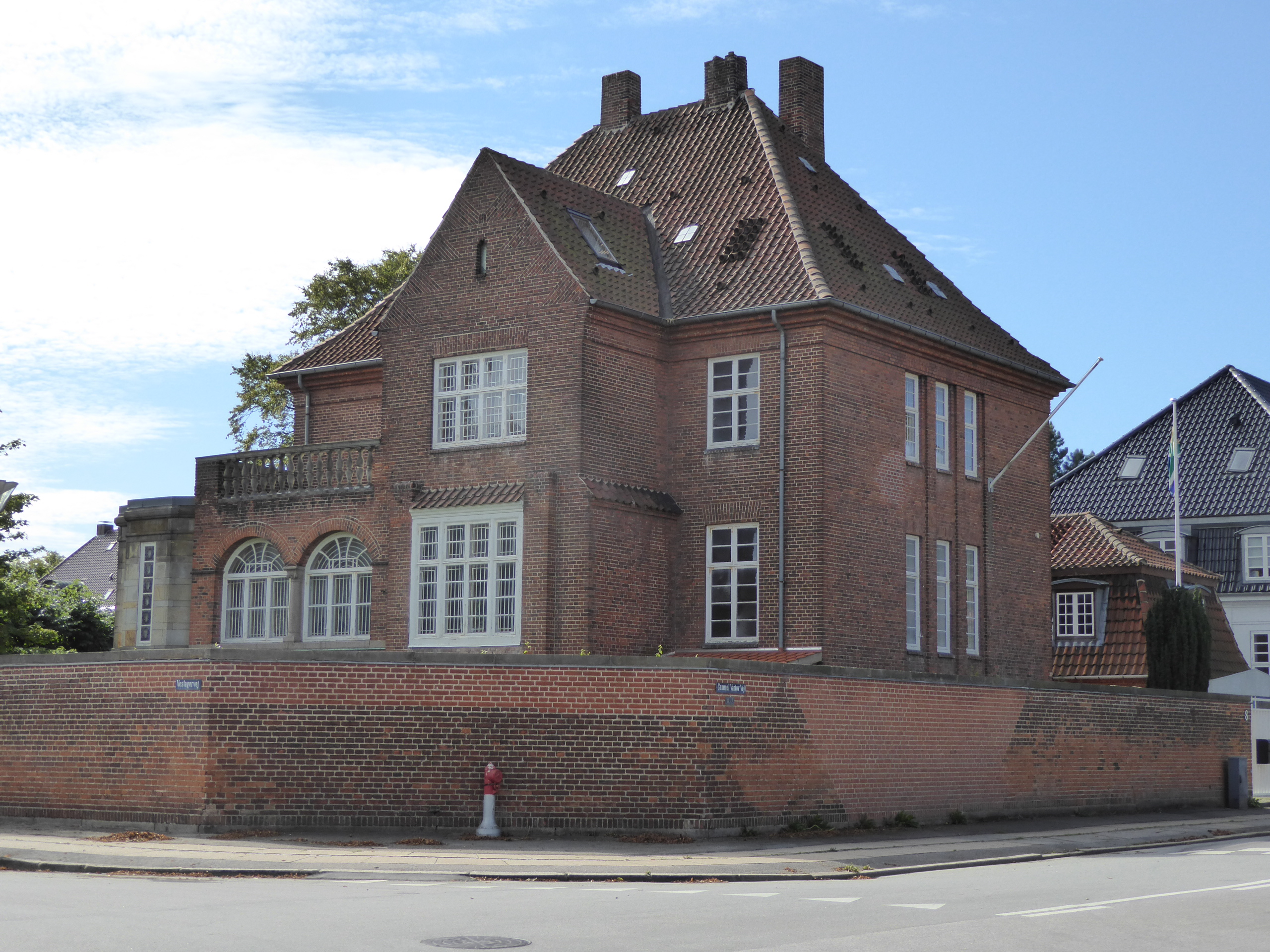
Embassy of South Africa in Copenhagen

Queen Margrethe II visited to South Africa in 1996. President Nelson Mandela visited Denmark in 1999. Denmark has always had a very active development co-operation programme with South Africa dating from the 1960s, which was changed to an assistance programme from 1995. Denmark assisted with 4 billion DKK. Denmark remains a strong supporter of NEPAD.

Cultural relations between South Africa and Denmark are established in, among other forums, the Danish Society in South Africa and the Nordic-South African Business Association.

== See also ==
- Foreign relations of Denmark
- Foreign relations of South Africa
