= Algeria–European Union relations =

European Union–Algeria relations
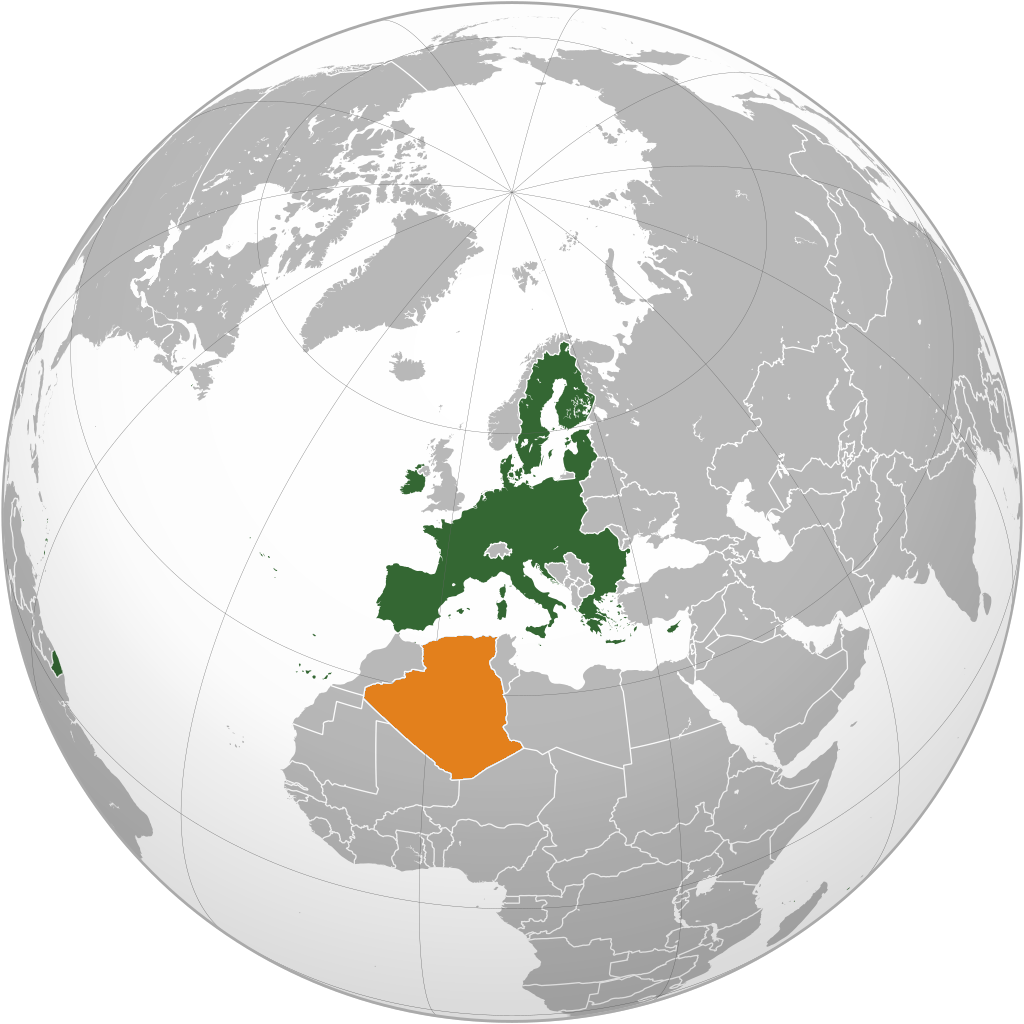
- European Union: Algeria

Algeria–European Union relations are the foreign relations between the country of Algeria and the European Union.

== History ==
Algeria was a part of the European Economic Community (EEC) during its incorporation within the French Republic, when it was known as L'Algérie Française and was considered an integral part of Metropolitan France. Following its independence from France in 1962, the legal status of its relationship with the EEC was unresolved, as the text of the (1957) Treaty of Rome continued to refer to Algeria by name as an overseas territory of France to which the treaty provisions applied. In 1976 the EEC signed a treaty with Algeria, formalizing their relationship as being between neighboring entities.

== Trade ==
Algeria has been in an association agreement and a free trade agreement with the European Union since 2005.

In 2016, 67% of Algeria's exports went to the EU and 44% of Algeria's imports came from the EU. Fuel and mining products made up 95.7% of EU imports from Algeria in 2017. Chemicals represented the second most important exported product, worth 2.9% of Algeria's exports to the EU. The EU's main exports to Algeria are machinery (22.2%), transport equipment (13.4%), agricultural products (12.8%), chemicals (12.8%) and iron and steel (10.2%).

== Funding and assistance ==
Algeria is receiving €108 million - €132 million under the European Neighbourhood Instrument. Currently funds are being used to promote economic efficiency, economic governance, and economic diversification, as well as strengthening democracy and reducing pollution.

Algeria is a member of the Euro-Mediterranean Partnership. Algeria also receives funding under the Development Cooperation Instrument (DCI), under programmes such as the European Instrument for Democracy and Human Rights. In total, these funds under the DCI were €5.5 million for 2015–2016.

The European Union is helping Algeria with its accession to the World Trade Organization, as well as holding informal talks on migration.

== Chronology of relations with the EU ==
Timeline
Date	Event
1 January 1958	The European Economic Community is established.
3 July 1962	Algeria gains independence from France following the Algerian War.
September 2005	The EU-Algeria Association Agreement enters into force.
7 March 2017	The EU and Algeria adopt new Partnership Priorities.

== Algeria's foreign relations with EU member states ==
- Austria
- Belgium
- Bulgaria
- Croatia
- Cyprus
- Czech Republic
- Denmark
- Estonia
- Finland
- France
- Germany
- Greece
- Hungary
- (Republic of Ireland) Ireland
- Italy
- Latvia
- Lithuania
- Luxembourg
- Malta
- Netherlands
- Poland
- Portugal
- Romania
- Slovakia
- Slovenia
- Spain
- Sweden

== See also ==
- Foreign relations of Algeria
- Foreign relations of the European Union
