= Algeria–Colombia relations =

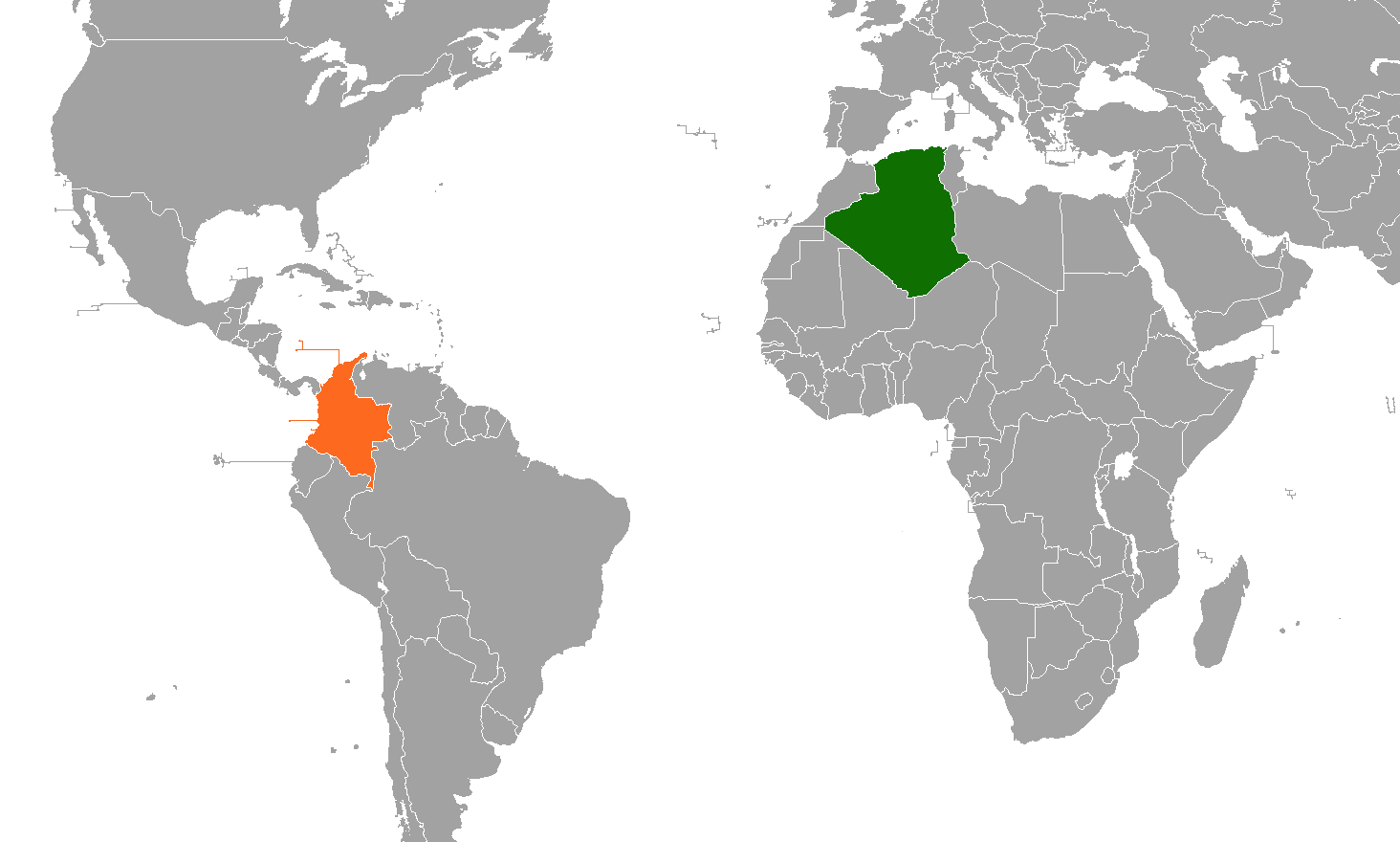
- Algeria: Colombia

Algeria–Colombia relations are the bilateral relations between Algeria and Colombia. Both countries are members of Group of 24, Non-Aligned Movement, Group of 77 and the United Nations.

== History ==
Algeria and Colombia established diplomatic relations on January 1, 1979. The embassy of Colombia in Algiers was opened in 1983, but due to severe budgetary reasons, Colombia closed its embassy in Algeria on February 7, 1994. In 1995, Algeria opened its embassy in Colombia. Colombia reopened its embassy in Algiers on February 5, 2014. On November 15, 2023, Colombian president Gustavo Petro supported Algeria in filing a complaint against the Gaza genocide caused by Israel.

== High-level visits ==
High-level visits from Colombia to Algeria

- President Ernesto Samper (1997)
- Minister of Foreign Affairs María Ángela Holguín (2013)

== Bilateral agreements ==
The two countries have signed several bilateral agreements such as a Trade Agreement between the Government of the Republic of Colombia and the Democratic and Popular Republic of Algeria (1991); Commercial Agreement between the Government of the Democratic and Popular Republic of Algeria and the Government of the Republic of Colombia (1997); Brotherhood Agreement between the cities of Cherchell and Cartagena (1997); Cultural Cooperation Agreement between the Government of the Republic of Colombia and the Government of the Democratic and Popular Republic of Algeria (2007); Memorandum of Understanding on the Promotion of Foreign Trade between Proexport and Algex (National Agency for the Promotion of Foreign Trade of Algeria) (2013); Visa Exemption Agreement for Diplomatic and Official Passports (2013) and a Memorandum of Understanding on Technical Cooperation between Colombia and Algeria (2014).

== Trade ==
In 2022, Algeria exported $47.9M to Colombia. The products exported from Algeria to Colombia included nitrogenous fertilizers ($17.2M), semi-finished iron ($14.9M), and cement ($11.3M). Colombia exported $1.42M to Algeria. The products exported from Colombia to Algeria consisted of bananas ($898k), coffee ($468k), and raw sugar ($29k).

== Diplomatic missions ==
- Algeria has an embassy in Bogotá.
- Colombia has an embassy in Algiers.

== See also ==
- Foreign relations of Algeria
- Foreign relations of Colombia
