= Foreign relations of Algeria =

Since its independence from France in 1962, Algeria has pursued an activist foreign policy. In the 1960s and 1970s, Algeria was noted for its support of Third World policies and independence movements. Since its independence, Algeria has been a member of the Arab League, the African Union and of the United Nations.

== History of foreign relations since independence ==
=== During Ben Bella's presidency (1962–1965) ===
Following its independence in 1962, Algeria developed deep ties with many foreign countries with a heavy presence in the global scene. The Algerian government, pursuing the dynamics that had started during the Algerian War for Independence and into the Cold War used the country's strategic geopolitical position – at the crossroads of Europe, Sub-Saharan Africa and the Arabian world – to assert its own interests. Algeria came to see itself as a full actor in the Cold War and not simply a bystander caught in a crossfire between the Western and Eastern blocs. Moreover, Algeria played a central role in the creation of the Third World as a global political project, using its position at the intersection of international agendas – notably between non-alignment and Afro-Asianism positions, and between anticolonial and socialist movements.

==== Algeria at the center of the competition between the Western and Eastern superpowers ====
Being a newly independent country from colonial rule of a Western power – France – and having waged a liberation war with a socialist orientation, Algeria was naturally inclined to turn towards the Soviet Union and its allies. However, the country's strategic advantages increased its importance to the eyes of the Western bloc. Primarily, France wanted to preserve its interests in the oil and gas exploitations in Algeria. As Charles de Gaulle stated to the Algerian finance minister in 1963, "If the Algerian government respects its commitments and takes into account our interests, it can count on our cooperation". Hence, French economic aid continued to flow in Algeria, to ensure control on the petroleum and gas industry as well as maintain continued use of Algerian soil to run atomic tests in the Saharan desert. Under Ben Bella, diplomatic relations with France were normalized, the negotiations concerning oil and gas leading to an agreement in 1964. As to the United States, they wanted to prevent Algeria from becoming yet another socialist country joining the ranks of the Soviet bloc. Hence, along with minor military equipment, the United States provided Algeria with a food program (PL-480) which delivered free food to the population. However, the Algerian commitment to supporting anti-colonial movements in Africa went against American interests in the continent, which led to an indirect conflict with the United States and an increasingly hostile relationship between the two countries.

During the war for independence, the ALN had already benefitted from equipment, training and advice from communist countries: the USSR (though its help was quite timid until the final months of the war), China, Yugoslavia and Czechoslovakia. Moreover, ALN delegations had visited China and North Vietnam to learn from their guerrilla strategies. Help and support from the communist bloc therefore increased after independence:

- Even though Algeria was not a communist regime, the Soviet Union invested massive amounts of money and material help in the country. For instance, in 1963, the USSR granted $200 million in import credits for Soviet machinery to help build the Algerian industry, and committed to building a petrochemical research institute. The Soviet Union also agreed to buy agricultural products and minerals that Algeria was struggling to export. It was finally the country's main military supplier, providing planes, tanks, armored vehicles, ships, light weapons and ammunition for a total of 11 billion dollars from 1962 to 1989.
- The other great communist power, China, demonstrated its interest in Algeria as a fellow antiimperialist country. Hence, when Zhou Enlai visited Algeria in December 1963, he granted Algeria a low-interest loan of $100 million. Moreover, the Chinese were more aggressive in their support for armed groups fighting imperialist and neo-imperialist regimes in Africa. Algeria and China therefore cooperated on this matter, with China contributing to ANP training camps, and shipping weapons and revolutionary militants to Algeria.

The Sino-Soviet split strengthened the two communist countries' competition for Algeria. However, China was inferior economically and militarily to the USSR, and could not match the USSR's industrial equipment and sophisticated armaments. Moreover, as the autogestion model proved to be widely inefficient, Algeria started to move towards a more centralized and Soviet-style economy by the end of 1964.

==== Algeria and the Third World project ====
Ben Bella's foreign policy was marked by globalism, as it was not restrained to a specific culture nor geographical region. Rather, the project of the Third World and its diverse manifestations – the Non-Aligned Movement, the Afro-Asian People's Solidarity Organization, etc. – were meant to include all the developing and anti-imperialist countries, and Algeria intended to play a major role in its development.

This role is perfectly summarized by Amilcar Cabral's – leader of the African Party for the Independence of Guinea and Cape Verde – famous declaration that Algeria was the "Mecca of revolution". Indeed, the Algerian foreign policy had been influenced by Frantz Fanon's and other radical Third World thinkers' urgings to "export revolution" to other countries suffering from the yoke of imperial oppression. Therefore, the support of armed nationalists and revolutionaries was one of the foundations of Algerian relations with African countries. Ever since 1960, the FLN camps in Algeria's neighboring countries (Morocco, Tunisia and Mali) had been used to provide training and material help to revolutionary movements. By 1963, Algeria was offering refuge, funds, weapons and training to rebels from a dozen African countries: the left-wing opposition in Morocco, the secessionist Sanwi government in Ivory Coast, the Sawaba party in Niger, the CNL (or "Simbas") in Congo-Leopoldville, the UPC in Cameroon, the MPLA and FNLA in Angola (250 recruits were trained in Algeria and 70 tons of armaments were sent to this country), and several armed groups in Zanzibar, Portuguese Guinea, South Africa and Namibia.

However, the Third World project also materialized through the various conferences and international organizations that united developing countries. Firstly, the Non-Aligned Movement, which was founded in Belgrade in 1961, and which Algeria joined shortly after its independence, defined the concept of non-alignment in the Cold War as a way for poor countries to exploit the conflicts and tensions and hence to promote their own interests. According to Jeffrey J. Byrne, the Algerian conception of the Non-Aligned Movement was that of a "political, goal-oriented and geographically unbounded anti-imperial solidarity". The Third World coalition could therefore encompass Latin America countries, and even Europe ones like Yugoslavia. Algeria was particularly important in this sense, as it acted as a bridge between blocs and regions. For instance, its position at the crossroads of the Arab and the sub-Saharan worlds enabled Algeria to create links and unity between these two regions: at Algeria's request, Arab countries supported Angolan and other African revolutions, while African countries endorsed the Palestinian cause. However, these global Third World solidarity links went further than Africa: for example, the National Liberation Front of South Vietnam opened a permanent office in Algiers (one of only two that were located in non-communist countries). One of the most successful Third World projects was the Organization of African Unity, founded in Addis Ababa in 1963 to formalize and institutionalize the main Third World principles. Moreover, Algeria advocated for the creation within the organization of a "liberation committee", the "Committee of Nine", to support national liberation movements (even by military means). This embodies the Algerian view of Third Worldism: the institutionalization of collective defiance towards the imperial system.

Therefore, if the multipolarity of international relations – the traditional East versus West bipolarism, but also the intra-communist poles and the development of Third World alternatives – had benefitted the non-aligned states such as Algeria, the latter's increasing reliance on the Soviet Union – especially since the Sand War against Morocco in 1963 – risked jeopardizing the country's independence and its relations with other powers, such as the United States or China.

=== During Boumediene's presidency (1965–1978) ===
Algerian foreign relations during the presidency of Houari Boumediene marked a shift towards more stable and Algero-centered policies, in opposition to Ben Bella's cosmopolitism. However, this greater focus on the country's economic needs and traditional Islamic culture did not end the period of international ambitions.

==== Algeria's centrality in the Third World ====
Pan-Africanism and Pan-Arabism were strengthened during the Boumediene era. Algeria had joined the Arab League in 1962, and hosted its 1973 summit in Algiers. This strong relation with other Arab countries, notably with Egypt, was reinforced after Boumediene's seizure of power. For instance, in 1966, Egyptian president Gamal Abdel Nasser sent thousands of teachers to support Algeria in the Arabization of its educational system. After Nasser's death in 1970, Boumediene increasingly represented the political project of Pan-Arabism; and in 1973, Algeria played a major role in the organization of the war against Israel, as well as calling for oil to be used as a weapon in the OPEC. Moreover, in 1969, Algiers hosted the Pan-African Cultural Festival: this grandiose display of an African identity, forged from the continent's common experience of Western imperialism, reunited anticolonial militants from numerous countries of the Third World. Far from being opposed, Pan-Arabism and Pan-Africanism were, under Algerian influence, united: Boumediène summoned an extraordinary session of the Organization for African Unity following the Kippur War in 1973, which resulted in the creation of a special committee to coordinate the Organization and the Arab League, and in the break of diplomatic relations of 42 African states with Israel. Finally, Boumediène presided over a larger and more powerful Non-Aligned Movement in 1973.

Algeria's approach to international politics was motivated by the need for a "liberation" from the Western neocolonial economic superiority. Hence, in October 1967, Algiers hosted the meeting of the "Group of 77", which united 77 developing countries on major revendications: a global reform of the terms of trade and a greater collaboration between Third World countries to set the prices for their raw materials. Furthermore, the main points of Boumediene's address to the United Nations General Assembly in 1974 – reparations for colonization and a transfer of resources from North to South – were adopted by UN. The notion of a "new international economic order" emerged as a way to reshape the world economy to the benefit of developing countries, based on the principle of sovereign equality between states.

==== A careful equilibrium between Cold War powers ====
Boumediene took pride in Algeria's non-aligned status, by claiming its distance from both Soviet-style socialism and Western capitalism, while the country enjoyed an increasing prosperity. However, support from the Communist bloc did not halt. Indeed, because of their dependence on raw materials and their lack of hard currencies, commerce between Third World countries was negligible. The USSR, on the contrary, was able to deliver military equipment, industrial expertise, and trade outputs: the Soviets replaced France as the first destination for Algerian wine, and provided 200,000 tons of wheat when a drought hit the country in 1966.

Once again, the support Algeria received from the Soviet bloc was not exclusive to that of the Western bloc. Even though Boumediene took strong public stands, as when he claimed in 1969 after a summer of violence against Algerians living in France that if the French government could not insure the security of Algerian immigrants, he would repatriate them regardless of the cost, Algerian-French relations were progressively normalized during the 1970 decade. This posturing, like the nationalization of oil in 1971, served to increase his popularity in internal politics. However, France remained a model of prosperity, Algeria was still heavily dependent on France economically, and in 1975, French President Valéry Giscard d'Estaing made the first presidential visit since independence. More generally, Algeria continued to do business with the West, and avoided to be overly dependent on Soviet support. Indeed, despite the break of relations with the United States after the Six-Day War in 1967, the Americans had almost replaced France as Algeria's primary trade partner by the early 1970s. Therefore, the competition between the West and the USSR gave Algeria opportunities to diversify its economic partnerships.

=== During Bouteflika's presidency (1999 - 2019) ===
Since his inauguration in 1999, President Abdelaziz Bouteflika sought to extend Algeria's international influence, traveling extensively throughout the world. In July 2001, he became the first Algerian President to visit the US White House in 16 years.

He made official visits, among others, to France, South Africa, Italy, Spain, Germany, China, Japan, South Korea and Russia.

=== After Bouteflika (2019-) ===
On 24 August 2021, Algeria cut diplomatic relations with neighbouring Morocco, accusing Morocco of supporting a separatist group and hostile actions against Algeria. Morocco called the decision unjustified.

On September 10, 2026, Algeria also cut off full diplomatic relations with the United Arab Emirates, accusing the UAE of supporting the banned separatist MAK movement, a growing Emirati footprint across Libya, Mali, and Niger, and the UAE's backing of Morocco on the Western Sahara question.

== Diplomatic relations ==
List of countries which Algeria maintains diplomatic relations with:

#	Country	Date
1	North Korea	25 September 1958
2	China	20 December 1958
3	Mongolia	25 June 1961
4	Russia	19 March 1962
5	Czech Republic	23 March 1962
6	Hungary	7 April 1962
7	Romania	16 April 1962
8	Poland	2 May 1962
9	India	2 July 1962
10	Serbia	2 July 1962
11	Germany	3 July 1962
12	France	5 July 1962
13	Syria	27 August 1962
14	United States	29 September 1962
15	Italy	1 October 1962
—	Morocco (suspended)	1 October 1962
16	Cuba	7 October 1962
17	Bulgaria	10 October 1962
18	Netherlands	17 October 1962
19	Norway	27 October 1962
20	Vietnam	28 October 1962
21	Egypt	8 November 1962
22	Switzerland	13 November 1962
23	Tunisia	13 November 1962
24	United Kingdom	21 November 1962
25	Brazil	28 November 1962
26	Japan	28 November 1962
27	Belgium	11 December 1962
28	Lebanon	18 December 1962
29	Spain	18 December 1962
30	Jordan	December 1962
31	Finland	18 January 1963
32	Austria	25 January 1963
33	Albania	12 February 1963
34	Sweden	20 April 1963
35	Ghana	2 May 1963
36	Chile	4 June 1963
37	Turkey	30 June 1963
38	Mali	22 July 1963
39	Pakistan	16 August 1963
40	Libya	24 August 1963
41	Democratic Republic of the Congo	August 1963
42	Saudi Arabia	August 1963
43	Denmark	3 September 1963
44	Indonesia	20 December 1963
45	Cameroon	1 January 1964
46	Republic of the Congo	4 January 1964
47	Luxembourg	21 January 1964
48	Guinea	24 January 1964
49	Tanzania	21 February 1964
50	Mauritania	9 April 1964
51	Senegal	9 April 1964
52	Madagascar	15 June 1964
53	Argentina	18 June 1964
54	Kenya	23 June 1964
55	Uruguay	21 August 1964
56	Iran	23 September 1964
57	Mexico	21 October 1964
58	Benin	7 November 1964
59	Kuwait	23 November 1964
60	Malaysia	26 November 1964
61	Yemen	22 December 1964
62	Niger	12 March 1965
63	Ivory Coast	21 July 1965
64	Canada	12 November 1965
65	Sudan	22 December 1965
66	Uganda	1965
67	Trinidad and Tobago	1965
68	Greece	15 April 1966
69	Cambodia	2 December 1966
70	Burkina Faso	10 January 1967
71	Nepal	29 April 1968
72	Nigeria	2 September 1968
73	Myanmar	15 November 1968
74	Afghanistan	December 1969
75	Central African Republic	9 October 1970
76	Venezuela	23 March 1971
77	Iraq	15 July 1971
78	Liberia	31 December 1971
—	Holy See	6 March 1972
79	Peru	10 March 1972
80	Sierra Leone	7 April 1972
81	Burundi	April 1972
82	Gambia	22 May 1972
83	Sri Lanka	1972
84	Zambia	15 January 1973
85	Panama	9 February 1973
86	Laos	15 May 1973
87	Ecuador	2 July 1973
—	United Arab Emirates (suspended)	6 July 1973
88	Qatar	18 July 1973
89	Bangladesh	30 July 1973
90	Gabon	8 September 1973
91	Somalia	17 March 1974
92	Guinea-Bissau	13 May 1974
93	Australia	8 July 1974
94	Oman	September 1974
95	Malta	22 January 1975
96	Jamaica	30 January 1975
97	Ireland	January 1975
98	Portugal	7 March 1975
99	Philippines	10 April 1975
100	Chad	18 August 1975
101	Rwanda	25 November 1975
102	Thailand	6 December 1975
103	Mauritius	12 February 1976
—	Sahrawi Arab Democratic Republic	6 March 1976
104	Guyana	20 September 1976
105	Seychelles	September 1976
106	Angola	19 October 1977
107	Cape Verde	19 October 1977
108	Djibouti	10 October 1978
109	Cyprus	9 November 1978
110	Equatorial Guinea	9 November 1978
111	Colombia	1 January 1979
112	São Tomé and Príncipe	7 January 1979
113	Comoros	27 February 1979
114	Barbados	18 April 1979
115	Mozambique	16 September 1979
116	Grenada	18 September 1979
117	Botswana	30 November 1979
118	Bolivia	2 February 1980
119	Zimbabwe	31 August 1980
120	Malawi	19 June 1981
121	Nicaragua	September 1981
122	Suriname	30 March 1982
123	Ethiopia	6 November 1982
124	Singapore	12 May 1983
125	Iceland	17 May 1983
126	Bahrain	19 November 1983
127	Lesotho	1983
128	New Zealand	29 October 1985
129	Vanuatu	15 July 1986
130	Togo	2 July 1987
131	Maldives	8 March 1988
—	State of Palestine	16 December 1988
132	Antigua and Barbuda	1 November 1989
133	South Korea	15 January 1990
134	Guatemala	31 January 1990
135	Costa Rica	13 March 1990
136	Namibia	21 March 1990
137	Uzbekistan	30 June 1992
138	Ukraine	10 August 1992
139	Slovenia	12 October 1992
140	Croatia	15 October 1992
141	Armenia	30 December 1992
142	Slovakia	1 January 1993
143	Bosnia and Herzegovina	20 January 1993
144	Georgia	27 May 1993
145	Eritrea	25 March 1994
146	Moldova	12 April 1994
147	Lithuania	15 April 1994
148	Azerbaijan	22 April 1994
149	South Africa	10 May 1994
150	Turkmenistan	21 September 1994
151	Honduras	21 October 1994
152	Eswatini	1994
153	Brunei	24 January 1995
154	Paraguay	3 February 1995
155	Belarus	24 October 1995
156	Kazakhstan	15 March 1996
157	Kyrgyzstan	21 December 1996
158	Estonia	19 March 1997
159	Tajikistan	10 June 1997
160	Latvia	29 April 1998
161	Belize	28 November 2001
162	North Macedonia	21 March 2002
163	Timor-Leste	20 May 2002
164	San Marino	13 February 2003
165	Andorra	29 March 2005
166	Liechtenstein	21 October 2005
167	Dominica	22 June 2006
168	El Salvador	20 December 2006
169	Monaco	31 January 2007
170	Saint Vincent and the Grenadines	7 February 2007
171	Montenegro	24 September 2007
172	Dominican Republic	26 September 2007
173	Saint Kitts and Nevis	1 October 2007
174	Fiji	2 June 2010
175	Tuvalu	6 June 2012
176	Solomon Islands	7 June 2012
177	South Sudan	9 September 2015
178	Marshall Islands	26 September 2019
179	Kiribati	21 October 2019
180	Saint Lucia	19 December 2022
181	Bahamas	1 May 2024

== Africa ==
Algeria has friendly relations with other countries in the Maghreb, Tunisia and Libya, and with Sub-Saharan countries Mali and Niger. Algeria has taken the lead in working on issues related to the African continent. Host of the Organisation of African Unity Conference in 2000, Algeria also was key in bringing Ethiopia and Eritrea to the peace table in 2000. It has worked closely with other African countries to establish the New Partnership for Africa's Development. Algeria has taken a lead in reviving the Arab Maghreb Union with other regional Arab countries.

Country	Formal Relations Began	Notes
Egypt		See Algeria–Egypt relations: Algeria has an embassy in Cairo.; Egypt has an embassy in Algiers.
Ethiopia	1968	Algeria has an embassy in Addis Ababa.; Ethiopia closed its embassy in Algiers in 2021.
Ghana	1962	Algeria has an embassy in Accra.; Ghana has an embassy in Algiers.
Kenya	23 June 1964	See Algeria–Kenya relations Both countries established diplomatic relations on 23 June 1964 when the Algerian ambassador to Kenya, Mr. Nouredien Djoudi, presented his credentials to the Governor-General.: Algeria has an embassy in Nairobi.; Kenya has an embassy in Algiers.
Libya	24 August 1963	See Algeria–Libya relations Both countries established diplomatic relations on 24 August 1963. Algeria–Libya relations have generally been amicable. Libyan support for the Polisario in the Western Sahara facilitated early post independence Algerian relations with Libya. Libyan inclinations for full-scale political union, however, have obstructed formal political collaboration because Algeria has consistently backed away from such cooperation with its unpredictable neighbour. (A vote by the CCN (Algeria) on June 30, 1987, actually supported union between Libya and Algeria, but the proposal was later retracted by the FLN Central Committee after the heads of state failed to agree.) The Treaty of Oujda between Libya and Morocco, which represented a response to Algeria's Treaty of Fraternity and Concord with Tunisia, temporarily aggravated Algerian-Libyan relations by establishing a political divide in the region--Libya and Morocco on one side; Algeria, Tunisia, and Mauritania on the other. Finally, in 1988 Libya was invited to participate in the Inter-Maghrib commission that was responsible for developing the North African Union. The establishment of the UMA in February 1989 marked the first formal political or economic collaboration between the two neighbours.: Algeria has an embassy in Tripoli and a consulate in Sabha.; Libya has an embassy in Algiers.
Madagascar	15 June 1964	Both countries established diplomatic relations on 15 June 1964: Algeria has an embassy in Antananarivo.; Madagascar has an embassy in Algiers.
Mali	22 July 1963	See Algeria–Mali relations Both countries established diplomatic relations on 22 July 1963.: Algeria has an embassy in Bamako and a consulate in Gao.; Mali has an embassy in Algiers and a consulate in Tamanrasset.
Mauritania	1964	See Algeria–Mauritania relations: Algeria has an embassy in Nouakchott.; Mauritania has an embassy in Algiers.
Morocco	1 October 1962	See Algeria–Morocco relations Both countries established diplomatic relations on 1 October 1962. Severed diplomatic relations 27 February 1976, restored 16 May 1988, cuts diplomatic relations 24 August 2021. Algeria–Morocco relations have been dominated by the issue of self-determination for the Western Sahara since their independence. The national integrity of this former colonial territory has caused a deep-seated antagonism and general mistrust between the two nations that has permeated all aspects of Moroccan-Algerian relations. Algeria's interest in the region dates back to the 1960s and 1970s when it joined Morocco, Mauritania & Libya in efforts to remove the Spanish from the territory. After Spain announced its intention to abandon the province, then known as Spanish Sahara, in 1975, the united front presented by the Maghreb nations quickly disintegrated, as a result of Morocco, and subsequently Mauritania, staking claims to the territory. Algeria, although not asserting any territorial ambitions of its own, was averse to the absorption of the territory by any of its neighbors and called for self-determination for the Saharawi people. Before the Spanish evacuation, Spain, Morocco, and Mauritania agreed to divide the territory and transfer the major part to Morocco and the remaining southern portion to Mauritania. This agreement violated a United Nations (UN) resolution that declared all historical claims on the part of Mauritania or Morocco to be insufficient to justify territorial absorption and drew heavy Algerian criticism.: Algeria has an embassy in Rabat, a consulate-general in Casablanca and a consulate in Oujda.; Morocco has an embassy in Algiers and consulates-general in Oran and Sidi Bel Abbès.
Niger	12 March 1965	Both countries established diplomatic relations on 12 March 1965 when the government of Niger has agreed to the nomination of M. Ali Abdellaoui as Algeria's Ambassador in Niamey with residence in Abidjan: Algeria has an embassy in Niamey and a consulate in Agadez.; Niger has an embassy in Algiers and a consulate in Tamanrasset.; In August 2023, Algeria proposed a six-month civilian-led transition to resolve Niger's political crisis, diverging from potential military intervention discussed by ECOWAS, emphasizing diplomacy and seeking UN involvement while hosting a conference on Sahel region development. Algeria also denied France's alleged request for military operations in Niger.
Sahrawi Arab Democratic Republic	6 March 1976	See Algeria–Sahrawi Arab Democratic Republic relations Since 1976, Algeria has supported the Polisario Front, a group claiming to represent the population of Western Sahara, which is based among the 90,000 Sahrawi refugees who reside in refugee camps in Algeria. Contending that the Sahrawis have a right to self-determination under the UN Charter, Algeria has provided the Polisario with material, financial, and political support and sanctuary in southwestern Algeria's Tindouf Province. UN involvement in the Western Sahara includes MINURSO, a peacekeeping force, and UNHCR, for refugee assistance and resettlement. Active diplomatic efforts to resolve the dispute under the auspices of the Special Representative of the Secretary General are on-going. Although the land border between Morocco and Algeria was closed in the wake of a terrorist attack, the two have worked at improving relations.: Sahrawi Arab Democratic Republic has an embassy in Algiers.
South Africa	10 May 1994	See Algeria–South Africa relations Both countries established full diplomatic relations on 10 May 1994: Algeria has an embassy in Pretoria.; South Africa has an embassy in Algiers.
Sudan	22 December 1965	See Algeria–Sudan relations Both countries established diplomatic relations on 22 December 1965.: Algeria has an embassy in Khartoum.; Sudan has an embassy in Algiers.
Tunisia	13 November 1962	See Algeria–Tunisia relations Both countries established diplomatic relations on 13 November 1962. Smaller and in a more precarious position vis-à-vis Libya, Tunisia has consistently made efforts to align with Algeria. In the 1970s, Tunisia reversed its position on the Western Sahara so as not to antagonize Algerian authorities. Tunisia was the first nation to sign the Treaty of Fraternity and Concord with Algeria, in 1983. Throughout Algeria's independent history, it has joined in a number of economic ventures with Tunisia, including the transnational pipeline running from Algeria through Tunisia to Italy. In 1987 the departure from power in Tunisia of President Habib Bourguiba and his replacement by the more diplomatic Zine el Abidine Ben Ali brought the two nations closer again.: Algeria has an embassy in Tunis and consulates in El Kef and Gafsa.; Tunisia has an embassy in Algiers, a consulate-general in Annaba and a consulate in Tébessa.

== Americas ==
Country	Formal Relations Began	Notes
Argentina	18 June 1964	See Algeria–Argentina relations Both countries established diplomatic relations on 18 June 1964: Algeria have an embassy in Buenos Aires.; Argentina have an embassy in Algiers.; Both are members of Group of 77 and of the Group of 24; Argentine Ministry of Foreign Relations: list of bilateral treaties with Algeria (in Spanish only); On November 18, 2008, the President of Argentina Cristina Fernández de Kirchner made an official visit to Algiers and met her counterpart, the President of Algeria, Abdelaziz Bouteflika.
Brazil	December 1962	See Algeria–Brazil relations: Algeria has an embassy in Brasília.; Brazil has an embassy in Algiers.
Canada	29 May 1964	See Algeria–Canada relations Both countries established diplomatic relations on 29 May 1964.: Algeria has an embassy in Ottawa and a consulate-general in Montreal.; Canada has an embassy in Algiers.
Cuba	17 October 1962	Both countries established diplomatic relations on 17 October 1962 Cuba and Algeria formed strong diplomatic links due to their historical and ideological proximity. Indeed, despite their geographical distance, the two countries saw themselves as the models of a successful socialist revolution against imperialist forces. Moreover, they more pragmatically believed that to defend themselves from American hostility, they ought to encourage revolutions elsewhere in Latin America and in Africa as to distract the United States and create new allies. Hence, guerrilla hero Ernesto "Che" Guevara visited Algeria twice, from October 1963 to February 1964, and in February 1965, and Cuban President Fidel Castro made a grand official visit to Algeria in 1972. Cuba also sent large quantities of military equipment (two ships, a unity of tanks and 700 soldiers) to Algeria in 1963 during the Sand War with Morocco. Indeed, once again, Algeria was a point of contact between African rebels and potential supporting countries such as Cuba. This relationship was mutually beneficial: Algeria received Argentinian training guerrilleros, a delegation of the Venezuelan National Liberation Front, and even sent armaments to the latter (in an Algerian ship, as to avoid American control) at Cuba's request.: Algeria has an embassy in Havana.; Cuba has an embassy in Algiers.
Mexico	21 October 1964	See Algeria–Mexico relations Both countries established diplomatic relations on 21 October 1964: Algeria has an embassy in Mexico City.; Mexico has an embassy in Algiers.
Peru	10 March 1972	Both countries established diplomatic relations on 10 March 1972. Main article: Algeria–Peru relations: Algeria has an embassy in Lima.; Peru has an embassy in Algiers.
United States	29 September 1962	See Algeria–United States relations Both countries established diplomatic relations on 29 September 1962 Military cooperation between the United States and Algeria were less sensible than that with the Soviet Union, and Algerian purchases in the early years of independence were mostly restrained to American planes. However, the intermediary role played by Algeria during the Iranian hostage crisis generated the purchase of general military equipment in 1985 through the Foreign Military Sales program. Even though the United States were initially positively inclined to develop strong diplomatic links with the newly independent Algerian state, their relations declined rapidly. Indeed, the Algerian official declarations against American interventionism in Africa and as far as North Vietnam, and their support to left-wing revolutionary groups against American-supported regimes (notably in Angola, but also in Latin America through their close connections with Cuba) increased the hostility against Algeria in American opinion. The United States feared that Algeria was more favorable to the communist bloc and risked threatening their interests. Moreover, the Algerians resented the American failure to deliver the kind of assistance they requested: although the PL-480 food program provided food to millions of Algerians, the government sought to develop its economy through wider and long-term industrial programs. As Foreign Affairs Minister Bouteflika stated in 1965, "The US gives us bread; what we need is work. We need factories that create things and give work to our people". However, despite the break of diplomatic relations with the United States in 1967 following the Six-Day War, their economic exchanges did not stop. Indeed, the United States had nearly replaced France as Algeria's first trade partner by the beginning of the 1970s. In July 2001, President Abdelaziz Bouteflika became the first Algerian President to visit the White House since 1985. This visit, followed by a second meeting in November 2001, a meeting in New York in September 2003, and President Bouteflika's participation at the June 2004 G8 Sea Island Summit, is indicative of the growing relationship between the United States and Algeria. Since the September 11, 2001 attacks in the United States, contacts in key areas of mutual concern, including law enforcement and counter-terrorism cooperation, have intensified. Algeria publicly condemned the terrorist attacks on the United States and has been strongly supportive of the international war against terrorism. The United States and Algeria consult closely on key international and regional issues. The pace and scope of senior-level visits has accelerated. In April 2006, then-Foreign Minister Bedjaoui met with Secretary of State Condoleezza Rice.: Algeria has an embassy in Washington, D.C., and a consulate-general in New York City.; United States has an embassy in Algiers.

== Asia ==
Country	Formal Relations Began	Notes
Bangladesh	30 July 1973	See Algeria–Bangladesh relations Both countries established diplomatic relations on 30 July 1973: Algeria has an embassy in Dhaka.; Bangladesh has an embassy in Algiers.
China	20 December 1958	See Algeria–China relations: Algeria has an embassy in Beijing.; China has an embassy in Algiers.
India	2 July 1962	See Algeria–India relations Both countries established diplomatic relations on 2 July 1962: Algeria has an embassy in New Delhi.; India has an embassy in Algiers.
Indonesia	1963	See Algeria–Indonesia relations: Algeria has an embassy in Jakarta.; Indonesia has an embassy in Algiers.
Iran	1964, severed diplomatic relations 27 March 1993, restored 8 September 2001	See Algeria–Iran relations: Algeria has an embassy in Tehran.; Iran has an embassy in Algiers.
Iraq	1962, severed diplomatic relations 1979, restored September 2001	Algeria has an embassy in Baghdad.; Iraq has an embassy in Algiers.
Israel		See Algeria–Israel relations Algeria has never had official diplomatic relations with Israel. In the mid 90s, while Israel and north African states slowly started diplomatic relations, Algeria remained one of the last countries to consider such a move. It was only when Israeli's President Shimon Peres and Prime Minister Ehud Barak met Algerian President Abdalziz Bouteflika at the funeral of Moroccan King Hassan ll on July 25, 1999, that comments about rapprochement were made.
Japan	28 November 1962	See Algeria–Japan relations Both countries established diplomatic relations on 28 November 1962. The Front de Liberation Nationale (FLN) opened a representative office in Tokyo in 1958. A Japanese embassy was opened in Algiers in 1964, and an Algerian embassy was opened in Tokyo the same year. Japan has extended extensive technological assistance to Algeria and cultural exchange programs are numerous: Algeria has an embassy in Tokyo.; Japan has an embassy in Algiers.
Malaysia	26 November 1964	See Algeria–Malaysia relations Both countries established diplomatic relations on 26 November 1964 Algeria has an embassy in Kuala Lumpur.: Malaysia has an embassy in Algiers.
Maldives	8 March 1988	Both countries established diplomatic relations on 8 March 1988: Algeria is represented in Maldives via its embassy in New Delhi; Maldives is represented in Algeria through a non-resident ambassador based, presumably, in London. (Note: Since Maldives High Commissioner/Ambassador to U.K. also serves as non-resident ambassador to France, therefore there's probability that Maldives High Commissioner/Ambassador to U.K also serves as Maldives non-resident ambassador to Algeria. This can be explained by close relations between Algeria and France)
Pakistan	16 August 1963	See Algeria-Pakistan relations Both countries established diplomatic relations on 16 August 1963. Algeria enjoys friendly relations with Pakistan, which offered support during Algeria's struggle for independence. Pakistan was the first country to recognize the "Provisional Government of the Republic of Algeria" in exile on 19 September 1958 and facilitating the opening of an official mission in Karachi (Pakistan), even before Algeria's independence was formally declared.: Algeria has an embassy in Islamabad.; Pakistan has an embassy in Algiers.
Palestine	16 December 1988	See Algeria-Palestine relations Both countries established diplomatic relations on 16 December 1988 Algeria has been a strong proponent of the rights of the Palestinian people, calling publicly for an end to violence in the Occupied Palestinian Territories.
Qatar	18 July 1973	See Algeria–Qatar relations Both countries established diplomatic relations on 18 July 1973: Algeria has an embassy in Doha.; Qatar has an embassy in Algiers.
Saudi Arabia	1962	See Algeria–Saudi Arabia relations: Algeria has an embassy in Riyadh and a consulate-general in Jeddah.; Saudi Arabia has an embassy in Algiers.
Singapore	12 May 1983	Both countries established diplomatic relations on 12 May 1983: Algeria is represented in Singapore via its embassy in Jakarta.; Singapore is represented in Algeria through a non-resident ambassador based in Ministry of Foreign Affairs (Singapore).
Syria	27 August 1962	See Algeria–Syria relations: Both countries established diplomatic relations on 27 August 1962; Algeria has an embassy in Damascus.; Syria has an embassy in Algiers.; Both countries are members of Arab League.
Turkey	1962	See also Algeria–Turkey relations: Algeria has an embassy in Ankara and a Consulate General in Istanbul.; Turkey has an embassy in Algiers.; Trade volume between the two countries was US$3.17 billion in 2018 (Algerian exports/imports: 1.14/2.03 billion USD).; 213,333 Algerian tourists visited Turkey in 2017.; Yunus Emre Institute has a local headquarters in Algiers.; 600,000 to 2,000,000 of Algerians are of Turkish descent.
United Arab Emirates	6 July 1973 (Diplomatic Severed 10 September 2026)	See Algeria–United Arab Emirates relations Both countries established diplomatic relations on 6 July 1973 when UAE officially opened an embassy in Algiers: Algeria has an embassy in Abu Dhabi and a consulate in Dubai.; UAE has an embassy in Algiers.
Vietnam	28 October 1962	See Algeria–Vietnam relations Both countries established diplomatic relations on 28 October 1962.: Algeria has an embassy in Hanoi.; Vietnam has an embassy in Algiers.

== Europe ==
Country	Formal Relations Began	Notes
Cyprus	3 April 1979	See Algeria–Cyprus relations Cyprus and Algeria have concluded various agreements. For example, in November 1997, Algeria and Cyprus agreed on a framework for maritime exchanges between the two countries, lifting obstacles on the free movement of ships and offering preferential treatment at the ports in both countries. In December 1999 Algeria and Cyprus signed an air transport agreement to introduce a legal framework governing air routes between Algeria and Cyprus. In July 2000, Algerian news agency APS signed a cooperation agreement with the Cypriot news agency that covers exchange of English news items and photographs. In December 2001, the Algerian firm Sonatrach and Cyprus oil company Medex Petroleum signed an exploration deal covering the north of Bordj Omar Idriss in the Illizi basin in south-eastern Algeria. Cyprus is considering Algeria as a potential partner to assist with extracting untapped oil and gas from the island's exclusive economic zone. Other partners being considered are Libya, Russian and Algeria – full details of the negotiations have not yet been released to the public domain.
France	3 July 1962	See Algeria–France relations In the early 1990s, nearly 20 percent of all Algerian exports and imports were destined for or originated from France. More than 1 million Algerians resided in France and there were numerous francophones in Algeria, creating a tremendous cultural overlap. French remained the language of instruction in most schools and the language used in more than two-thirds of all newspapers and periodicals and on numerous television programs. Algeria and France share a cultural background that transcends diplomatic maneuvers and has persisted throughout periods of "disenchantment" and strained relations. Over time, however, the arabization of Algeria and the increasing polarization of society between the francophone elite and the Arab masses have mobilized anti-French sentiment. Support for the arabization of Algerian society—including the elimination of French as the second national language and emphasis on an arabized education curriculum—and the recent success of the FIS indicate a growing fervor in Algeria for asserting an independent national identity. Such an identity emphasizes its Arab and Islamic cultural tradition rather than its French colonial past. However, France's support for the military regime that assumed power in early 1992 indicates that the cooperative relations between the two countries remain strong.: Algeria has an embassy in Paris and several consulates-general throughout the country.; France has an embassy in Algiers and consulates-general in Annaba and Oran.
Germany	1 October 1962	See Algeria–Germany relations Both countries established diplomatic relations on 1 October 1962.: Algeria has an embassy in Berlin and a consulate-general in Frankfurt.; Germany has an embassy in Algiers.
Greece	1962	See Algeria–Greece relations Relations between the two countries have been traditionally friendly since Algeria's first years of independence. Both countries are members of the Union for the Mediterranean. Greece was among the early countries to establish diplomatic relations with Algeria after its independence in 1962, by upgrading the then Greek Consulate General in Algiers to an embassy in 1963. As of 2009, the two countries had in place three bilateral agreements: Agreement on Economic, Scientific and Technical Cooperation (1982).; Agreement on Educational Cooperation (1988).; Agreement on Mutual Protection and Promotion of Investments (2000).; The Algerian Minister of Foreign Affairs visited Greece in February 2001, returning a previous visit paid by the Foreign Minister of Greece to Algeria. In 2003, Greek [National] Defence Minister Ioannos Papandoniou visited Algeria to discuss ways to consolidate military cooperation between Algeria and Greece. Since 2000, Algeria has supplied Greece with natural gas by virtue of a long-term Agreement between the two countries. The liquefied natural gas is transported by special vessels before eventually reaching the appropriate plant located in Megara, Attica. The exports of Algerian products to Greece amounted to $89 million in 2001, including mainly oil and oil derivatives, natural gas, inorganic chemicals, iron and steel. In the same year, Greek exports to Algeria amounted to $50.78 million, consisting mainly of cereals and related derivatives, tobacco products, pharmaceuticals, medical and non-ferrous minerals. In 2007, Algeria was ranked 6th among Greece's Arab trade partners.: Algeria has an embassy in Athens.; Greece has an embassy in Algiers.
Holy See	6 March 1972	See Algeria–Holy See relations Both countries established diplomatic relations on 6 March 1972.: Algeria is accredited to the Holy See from its Permanent Mission to the United Nations in Geneva, Switzerland.; Holy See has an apostolic nunciature in Algiers.
Italy	1 October 1962	See Algeria–Italy relations Both countries established diplomatic relations on 1 October 1962. Two countries have a strong connection, as northern part of Algeria's today was formerly territory of the Roman Empire which was originally from modern-day Italy. Italy and Algeria's relations is viewed as important for stability in the region.: Algeria has an embassy in Rome and a consulate-general in Milan.; Italy has an embassy in Algiers.; Both nations are members of the Union for the Mediterranean.; Italy is also Algeria's top commercial partner, with an exchange worth 8.67 billion dollars and a volume of imports of 4.41 billion, or 17.24% of global Algerian exports.
Poland	2 May 1962	See Algeria–Poland relations Both countries established diplomatic relations on 2 May 1962.: Algeria has an embassy in Warsaw.; Poland has an embassy in Algiers.
Portugal	7 March 1975	Both countries established diplomatic relations on 7 March 1975.: Algeria has an embassy in Lisbon.; Portugal has an embassy in Algiers.
Romania	16 April 1962	Both countries established diplomatic relations on 16 April 1962.: Algeria has an embassy in Bucharest.; Romania has an embassy in Algiers.; Both are members of the Union for the Mediterranean; Algerian Ministry of Foreign Affairs: information about relations with Romania (in French only)
Russia	23 March 1962	See Algeria–Russia relations Both countries established diplomatic relations on 23 March 1962. Algeria and Russia have had a strong military cooperation since the Algerian independence, as Algiers turned towards the USSR for purchasing armaments. Indeed, from 1962 to 1989, Algeria spent approximately 11 billion dollars for Soviet weapons: planes (MiG-21, MiG-23 et Su-24), tanks (T-55 et T-72), armored vehicles, several ships (including submarines), light weapons and ammunition.: Algeria has an Embassy in Moscow.; Russia has an Embassy in Algiers and a consulate in Annaba.
Serbia	5 July 1962	See Algeria–Serbia relations Algeria and Serbia (formerly Yugoslavia) formed a strong diplomatic relation shortly after the Algerian independence, marked by economic, military but also ideological cooperation. Indeed, the Yugoslavian economic system constituted a model for the Algerian-style autogestion experimented in the early Ben Bella years. Henceforth, the Yugoslavian government sent technical advisers and agricultural material to Algeria. Moreover, Yugoslavia and Algeria shared similar views on international matters, such as the necessity for the extension of the Non-Aligned Movement. Indeed, Tito saw in Algeria a way to legitimate the possibility of diversity in socialism, rather than the imposed and monolithic Soviet-model. Their alliance was also geopolitically strategic: Algeria constituted a gate into the African and Arab worlds for Yugoslavia, who intended to create stronger links with this continent. Therefore, while Yugoslavia benefited from Algerian close relations with African countries, Algeria could use Yugoslavian greater military and logistical resources to pursue its program of exporting revolution in the continent.: Algeria has an embassy in Belgrade.; Serbia has an embassy in Algiers.; Serbian Ministry of Foreign Affairs about bilateral relations with Algeria
Spain	18 December 1962	See Algeria–Spain relations Both countries established diplomatic relations on 18 December 1962.: Algeria has an embassy in Madrid and consulates-general in Alicante and Barcelona.; Spain has an embassy in Algiers and a consulate-general in Oran.
Ukraine	20 August 1992	See Algeria–Ukraine relations Both countries established diplomatic relations on 20 August 1992.: Algeria has an embassy in Kyiv.; Ukraine has an embassy in Algiers.
United Kingdom	1962	See Algeria–United Kingdom relations British Prime Minister David Cameron with Algerian Prime Minister Abdelmalek Sellal in Algeria, January 2013. Algeria established diplomatic relations with the United Kingdom on 16 November 1962.: Algeria maintains an embassy in London.; The United Kingdom is accredited to Algeria through its embassy in Algiers.; Both countries share common membership of the United Nations. Bilaterally the two countries have a Double Tax Convention, and a Strategic Partnership.

== See also ==
- Algeria and the United Nations
- List of diplomatic missions in Algeria
- List of diplomatic missions of Algeria
- Visa requirements for Algerian citizens
