= Algeria–Palestine relations =

- Palestine: Algeria

The alliance between Algeria and Palestine is strong and enduring. Algeria is a supporter of the Middle East peace process and it has no diplomatic relations with Israel.

== History ==
Algeria has been supportive of the Palestinian cause ever since winning Independence from France in 1962. The National Liberation Front or FLN had been a strong backer of the Palestinian Cause. During the Algerian War of Independence from 1954 to 1962 many Palestinians saw Algeria and its struggle for independence as a good model to be learned from. Algeria has supported the Palestine Liberation Organization since the 1970s and Algerian Presidents Houari Boumediene and Chadli Bendjedid both hosted and welcomed Yasser Arafat. Algeria also provided arms and training for Palestinian militants. In 1974 a Palestinian embassy was opened in Algeria and under Abdelaziz Bouteflika who was the President of the General Assembly, the PLO was admitted as an observer and Yasser Arafat addressed the United Nations General Assembly. In 1975, Algeria sponsored and voted in support of the UN General Assembly Resolution 3379 which equated Zionism with racism, and Algeria voted against Resolution 4686, which revoked the previous resolution in 1991. After the Camp David Accords Algeria severed all diplomatic relations with Egypt. During the First Intifada, Algeria had strongly condemned Israeli actions and convened the 1988 Arab League summit. The emergency Arab Summit offered to support the intifada with financial aid.

After the Palestinian Declaration of Independence on 15 November 1988, which happened in Algiers, Algeria became the very first country in the world to recognize the new State of Palestine on 15 November 1988 and officially established full diplomatic relations with it by 18 December 1988. But Algeria soon went into political turmoil and soon erupted into a Civil War after the Algerian parliamentary elections in December 1991 which were cancelled by the Algerian Military in January 1992.

On July 5, 2022, the Palestinian Authority confirmed to Algeria that it intended to give its name to a street in Ramallah.

== Current relations ==
After the 1993 Oslo Accords, Algeria continued to support the cause of Palestine more than ever before and had also endorsed the 2002 Arab Peace Initiative. Both Algerian Presidents Liamine Zeroual and Abdelaziz Bouteflika have been both balanced and moderate in that they both support the cause of the Palestinians while also working with the United States and other world powers for a just peace in the Middle East.

During the 2008–2009 Gaza war, Algerian Prime Minister Ahmed Ouyahia said "In the name of government, I express our strong condemnation of crimes against humanity perpetrated by Israel for a week against Gaza's people." After the 2010 Gaza flotilla raid, Algeria condemned "in the strongest terms" the Israeli onslaught against the fleet of international aid for Gaza and requested a "strong and unanimous" response from the international community. During the November 2012 Operation Pillar of Defense, Algeria strongly condemned, through Ministry of Foreign Affairs' spokesman Amar Belani, the "Israeli aggression against Gaza strip" and urged the United Nations Security Council and the international community to assume their responsibilities and "put an end to this dangerous escalation."

On 29 November 2012, Algeria voted in favor of UN General Assembly Resolution 67/19 on upgrading Palestine to non-member observer state status in the United Nations. During the 2014 Israel–Gaza conflict, Foreign Minister Ramtane Lamamra urged the international community to act to get Israel to immediately cease its attacks against Palestine and respect the truce from November 2012. "While condemning in the strongest terms the barbaric attacks against the defenceless Palestinian people, we believe that these attacks were encouraged by the complacent silence of the international community to Israeli expansionist policies and their negative impact on peace and security in the region," Lamamra said. He also underlined the need for urgent action within the United Nations to reach a formula that compels Israel to stop its aggressions on Gaza.

On December 7, 2021, Algeria announced an aid of 100 million dollars for Palestine and 300 scholarships made available to Palestinian students.

During the 2023– Gaza war, Algeria provided urgent humanitarian and medical aid to the Gaza Strip through Egypt including food, clothing and tents.

== See also ==
- Foreign relations of Algeria
- Foreign relations of Palestine
