= Algeria–Argentina relations =

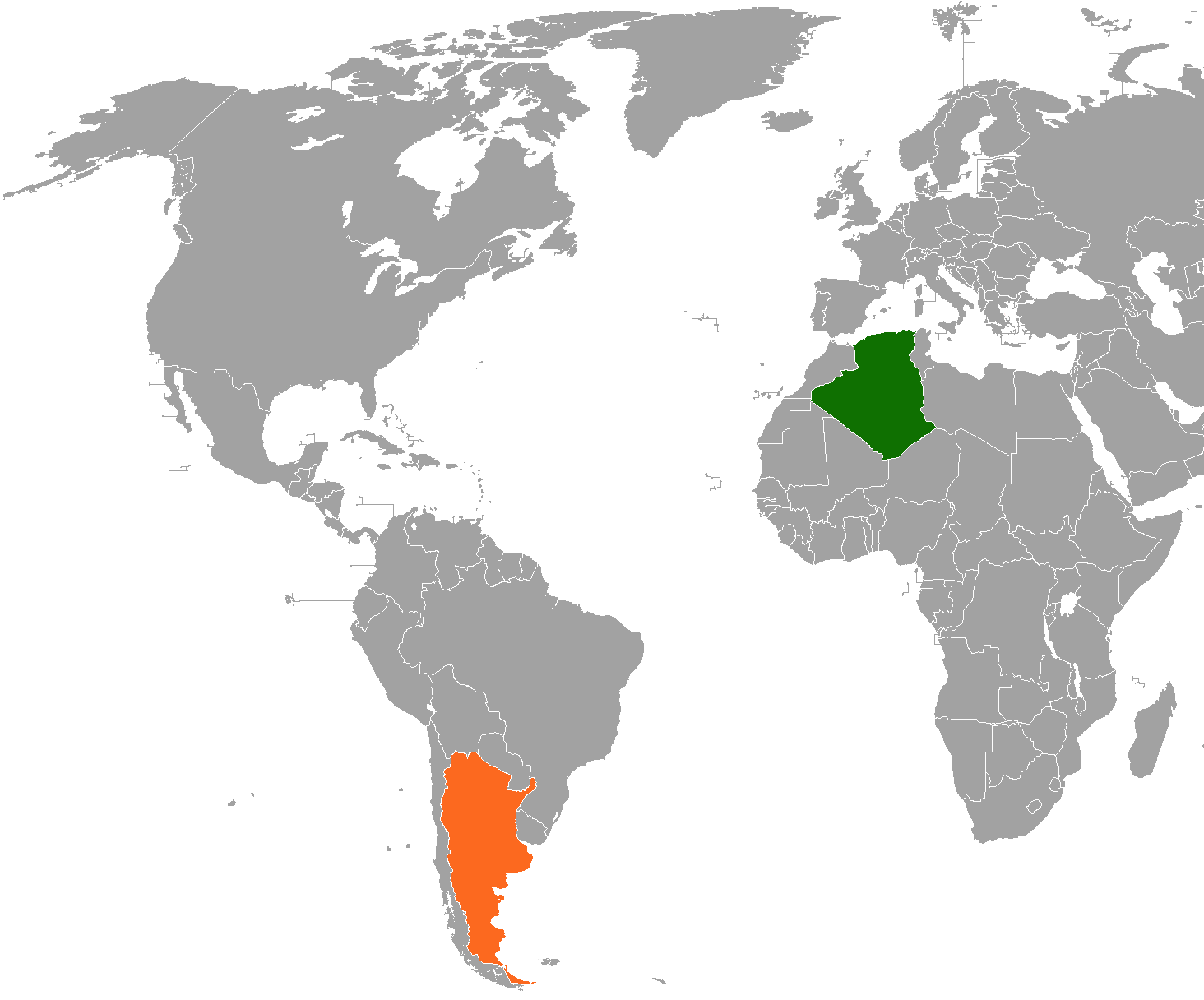
- Algeria: Argentina

The People's Democratic Republic of Algeria and the Argentine Republic are members of the Group of 15, Group of 24, Group of 77 and the United Nations.

== History ==
In March 1962, Algeria obtained its independence from France. That same year, Argentina recognized and established diplomatic relations with Algeria. In 1964, Argentina opened a resident embassy in Algiers and in 1973, Argentina sent a delegation to attend the 4th Non-Aligned Movement summit in Algiers.

In October 1984, Argentine President, Raúl Alfonsín, paid an official visit to Algeria; the first by an Argentine head-of-state to Algeria and to the African continent. In 1986, Algerian President, Chadli Bendjedid, reciprocated the visit to Argentina. In November 2008, Argentine President, Cristina Fernández de Kirchner paid an official visit to Algeria and met with her counterpart, President, Abdelaziz Bouteflika.

In February 2017, Argentine Foreign Minister Susana Malcorra paid a visit to Algeria to commemorate more than 50 years of diplomatic relations between both nations.

== High-level visits ==
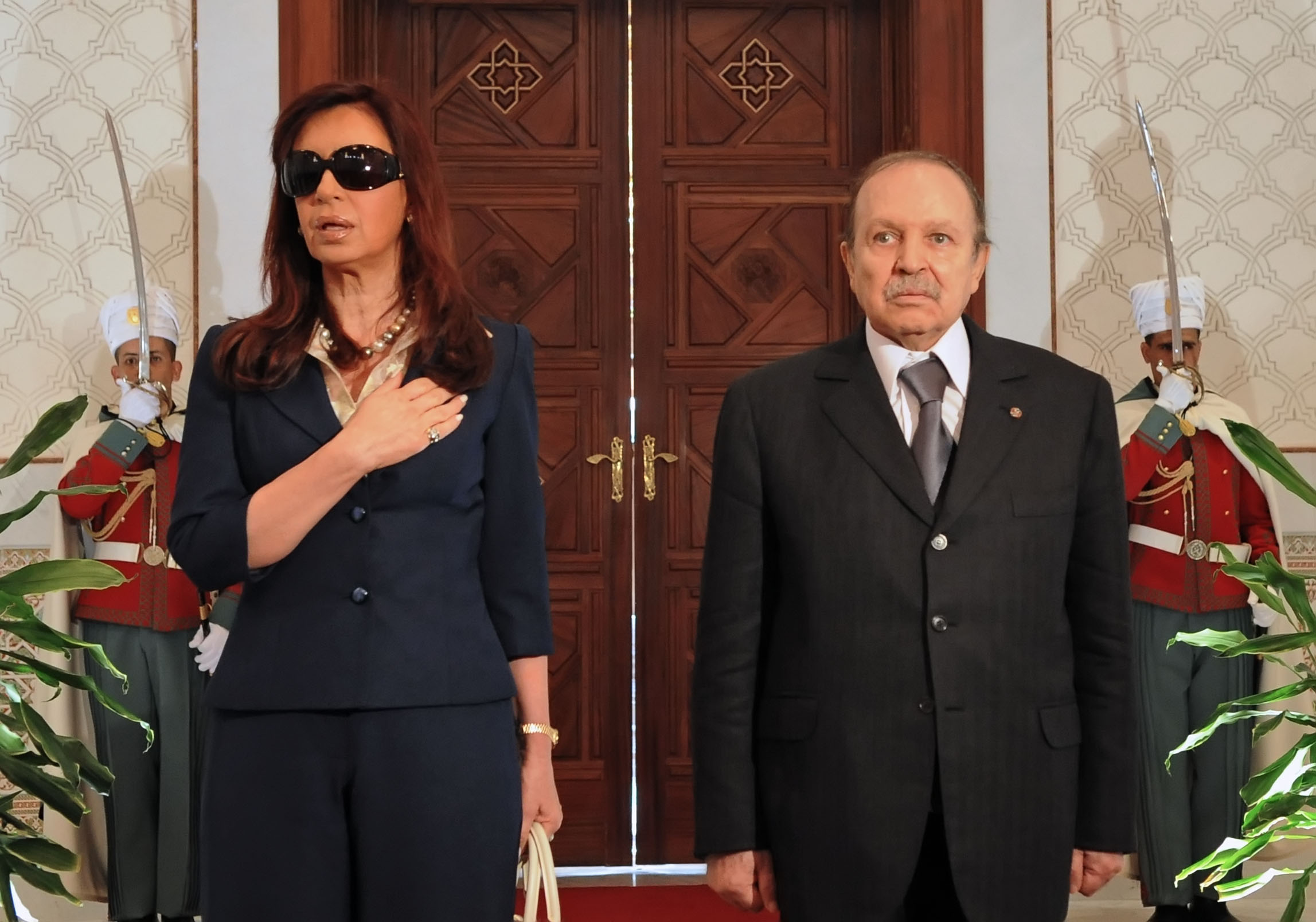
Algerian President Abdelaziz Bouteflika along with Argentine President Cristina Fernández de Kirchner during her visit to Algiers; November 2008.

High-level visits from Algeria to Argentina

- President Chadli Bendjedid (1986)
- Minister of Energy Chakib Khelil (2009)

High-level visits from Argentina to Algeria

- President Raúl Alfonsín (1984)
- Foreign Minister Dante Caputo (1984)
- President Cristina Fernández de Kirchner (2008)
- Foreign Minister Susana Malcorra (2017)

== Bilateral agreements ==
Both nations have signed several bilateral agreements such as an Agreement on Economic and Trade Cooperation (1983); Agreement in Scientific and Technological Cooperation (1984); Agreement on the Reciprocal Promotion of Investments (2000); Agreement of Cooperation between the Algerian National Center for Space Technology and the Argentine National Space Activities Commission (2002); Agreement of Cooperation in the Field of Public Health and Medical Sciences (2008); Agreement of Cooperation for the Development and Pacific use of Nuclear Energy (2008); Agreement in Cultural Cooperation (2008); Agreement of Cooperation between the Algerian Office for the Promotion of Foreign Trade and the Argentine Export office (2016); Agreement in Academic Cooperation (2016); and an Agreement in Sports Cooperation (2016).

== Resident diplomatic missions ==
- Algeria has an embassy in Buenos Aires.
- Argentina has an embassy in Algiers.

== See also ==
- Foreign relations of Algeria
- Foreign relations of Argentina
- Arab Argentines
