= Algeria–Iran relations =

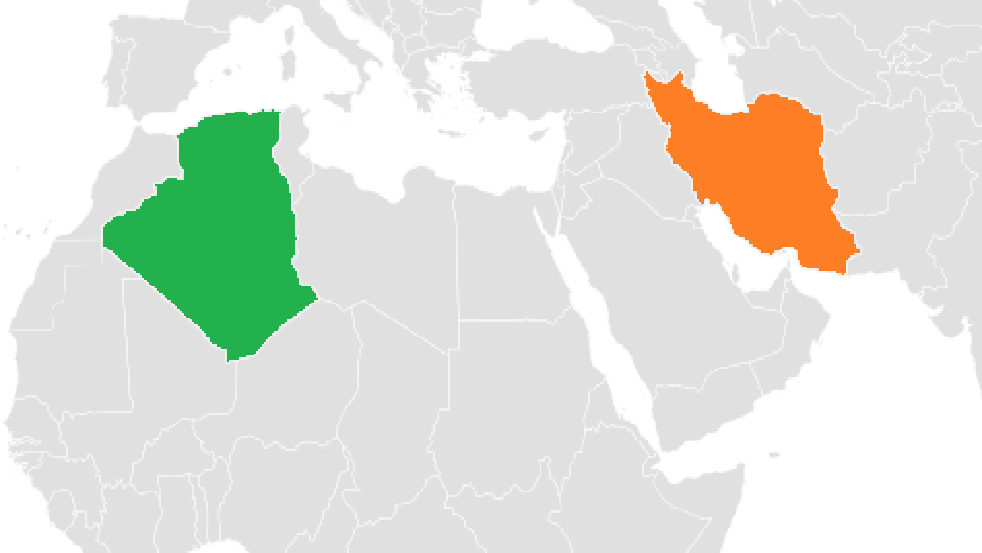

- Algeria: Iran

Diplomatic mission
- Embassy of Algeria, Tehran: Embassy of Iran, Algiers

Algeria–Iran relations refers to the diplomatic relations between Iran and Algeria. Algeria over-all has a friendly relationship with Iran despite having had some strains during the Algerian civil war and disagreements on some of Iran's regional policies in the Arab world.

== History ==
=== Islamic conquest ===
The Rustamid dynasty, a famous Ibadi Islamic dynasty in Algeria, was of Persian origin.

=== Modern relations ===
After the independence of Algeria, then-Pahlavi Iran soon established relations with Algeria, but due to its remoteness and lack of interests, Algeria and Iran's relations remained modest.

When the Iranian Revolution overthrew the Shah and replaced the monarchy with a theocratic Republic, Algeria served as representative of Iran's interests in the United States from 1981 until the Algerian Civil War.

=== Algerian Civil War ===
During the war, Algeria accused Iran, alongside Saudi Arabia, Morocco, Sudan and Libya for meddling in the conflict and supporting the hardcore Armed Islamic Group of Algeria which killed nearly 200,000 people. Iran was found to have used Sudan as a transit supporting rebels and secretly supported by Sudan.

Chadli Bendjedid, then-President of Algeria, believed that Algeria could not become the other Iran, and the Islamists, supported by both Iran and Saudi Arabia, were suppressed. This low-point relations pushed Algeria to finally cede their mission of representing Iran's interests in the United States in response to Iran's supports to GIA. Pakistan later replaced Algeria as representative of Iran's interests.

== Modern relations ==
Since the end of the civil war, Algeria and Iran re-approached the relationship in 2000 by Algerian President Abdelaziz Bouteflika and Iranian counterpart Mohammad Khatami, but there has been a strong mistrust alongside Algerian elites and majority Algerian population upon Iranian political desires, a legacy left behind because of Iran's involvement in the Algerian Civil War. Algeria still has some limits towards Iran's political desires in the country.

Nonetheless, in spite of historical concerns and mistrusts, Algeria and Iran still share some similar views. Algeria and Iran both opposed arming to the opposition groups in Syria amidst the Syrian Civil War or the same current Yemeni Civil War although limited in level terms as Iran directly involved in these wars while Algeria called for total mediations and ceasefires. Algeria is one of few Arab nations that is willing to cooperate with Iran.

Algeria keeps a strong cultural relationship with Iran, a legacy of its ensure neutrality. Economic ties between two nations are also growing expensively and positively, paving the way for deeper ties between the two nations.

== Algerian Embassy ==
Algeria maintains an embassy in Tehran.

- Ambassador Abdelmoun’aam Ahriz

== Iranian Embassy ==
Iran has an embassy in Algiers.

- Ambassador Hossein Mashalchizadeh

== See also ==
- Algeria–Saudi Arabia relations
- Arab League–Iran relations
