= Morocco–South Africa relations =

- Morocco: South Africa

Diplomatic mission
- Embassy of Morocco, Pretoria: Embassy of South Africa, Rabat

Diplomatic relations between Morocco and South Africa began on 2 September 1991, when a South African interest office opened in Rabat. On 1 April 1992, a Moroccan interest office was established in Pretoria. Later, both offices were converted to full embassies.

Since 2004, due to the Western Sahara conflict, a political dispute has been ongoing over South Africa's recognition and support of Western Sahara, and its alignment with Algeria.

== History ==
Relations between Morocco and South Africa formally began in 1962 when Nelson Mandela visited Morocco to engage with Abdelkrim al-Khatib, co-founder of the National Popular Movement to seek help from Morocco. Nelson Mandela resided in Oujda, as he received training from the Algerian National Liberation Front at bases across the Morocco–Algeria border. During this visit, Mandela sought training, financial, and military assistance for the armed wing of the African National Congress (ANC) against the apartheid.

After Mandela's release from prison in 1990. In an April 1995 speech, he recalled seeking support from the government of King Hassan II for weapons and funding for their armed struggle, he honored Khatib for supporting his battle both financially and militarily in a speech celebrating the anniversary of the 1994 South African general election.

In 2017, after Morocco rejoined the African Union, King of Morocco Mohammed VI and South African President Jacob Zuma resumed relations between the two countries, and upgraded the framework of diplomatic representation by appointing ambassadors in both Rabat and Pretoria in order to consolidate relations between the two countries.

== Western Sahara recognition ==
Morocco's annexation of Western Sahara has led to high diplomatic costs, particularly following its withdrawal from the Organisation of African Unity in 1984, which isolated it from the succeeding African Union members and cut off ties with states supporting the Sahrawi Arab Democratic Republic (SADR). Although the international recognition of the SADR has declined since the 1991 ceasefire between the Polisario Front and Morocco, South Africa was among the few countries to withdraw support in 2004 following Morocco's refusal of the Baker plan.

Nelson Mandela, in 1997, before delaying recognition of the SADR, cited obligations to allies like Morocco, which had contributed to the anti-apartheid movement. South African Foreign Minister Nkosazana Dlamini-Zuma later explained that recognition was postponed at Morocco's request to facilitate negotiations. However, the resignation of the UN envoy James Baker, and Morocco's lack of commitment to self-determination principles, required South Africa to recognize the SADR, aligning with African Union and UN principles based on the Charter of the United Nations, and the Constitutive Act of the African Union. Morocco reacted by recalling its ambassador to South Africa, criticizing its perceived ingratitude after historical support in combating apartheid.

South African President Thabo Mbeki expressed the necessity of recognizing Western Sahara’s self-determination rights under UN Security Council resolutions while opposing Morocco’s refusal and infringement of negotiation offers.

== Resident diplomatic missions ==
- Morocco has an embassy in Pretoria.
- South Africa has an embassy in Rabat.
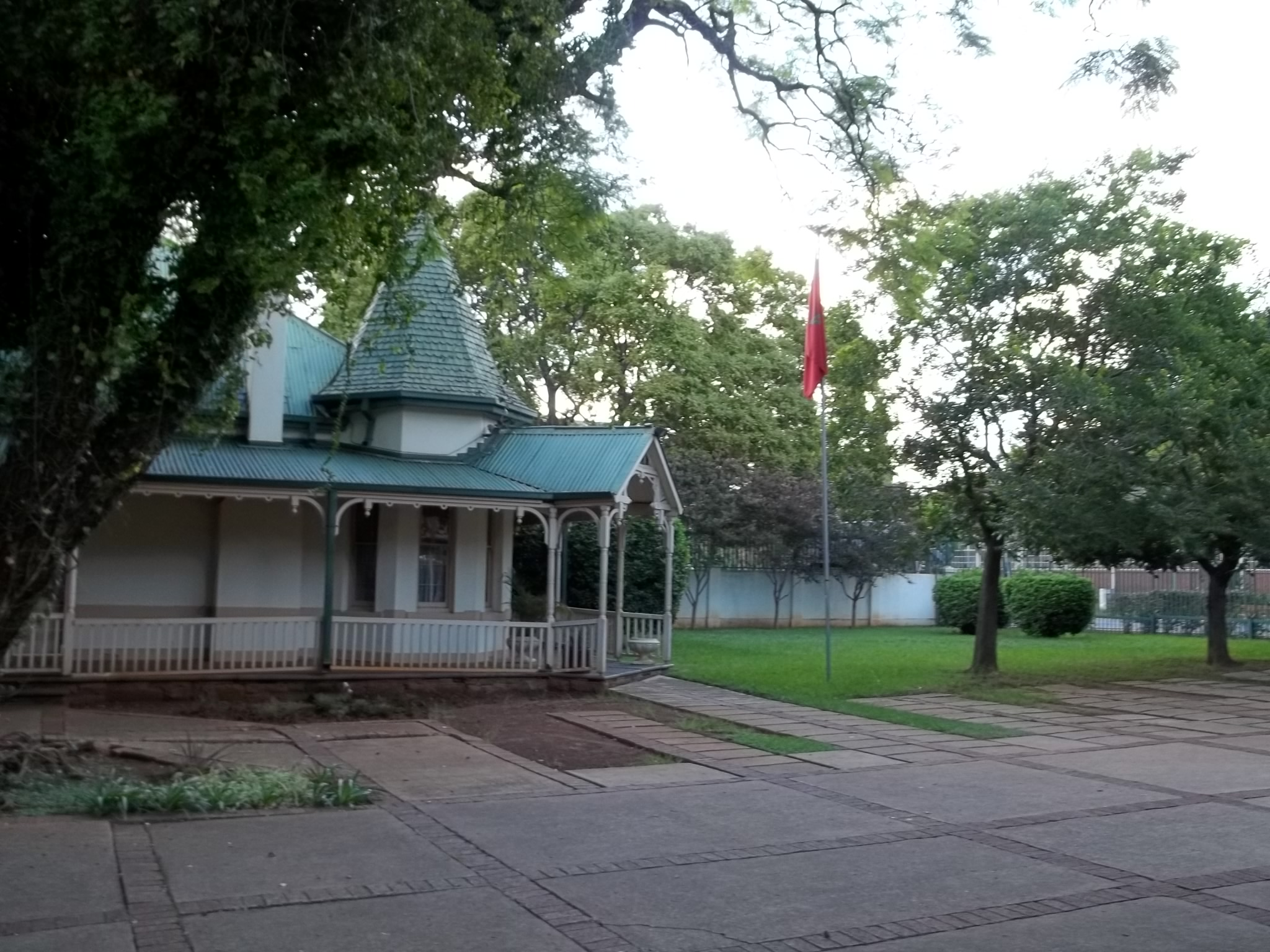
Embassy of Morocco in Pretoria

== See also ==
- Moroccans in South Africa
- Algeria–South Africa relations
