= Algeria–United Kingdom relations =

- Algeria: United Kingdom

Diplomatic mission
- Embassy of Algeria, London: Embassy of the United Kingdom, Algiers

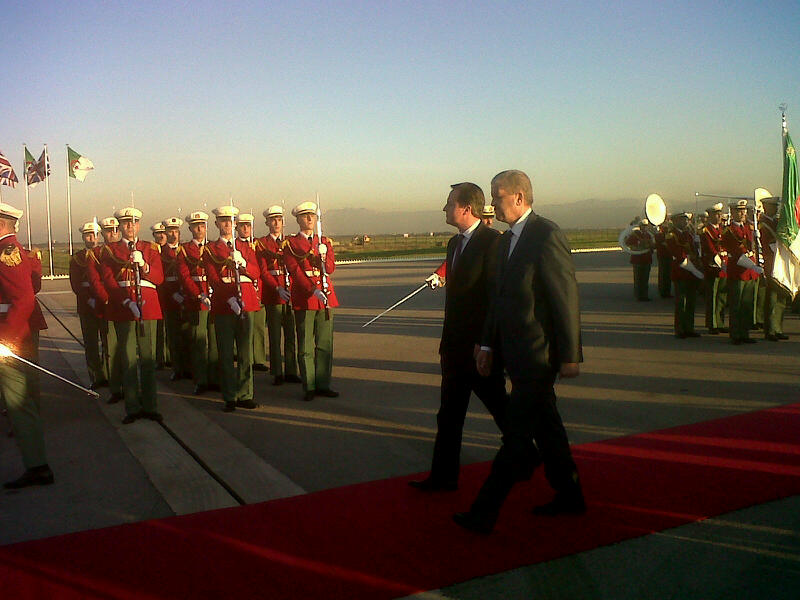
British Prime Minister David Cameron with Algerian Prime Minister Abdelmalek Sellal in Algeria, January 2013.

The bilateral relations between Algeria and the United Kingdom have evolved through phases of colonial legacies, Cold War diplomacy, counter terrorism cooperation, energy partnerships, and migration dialogue.

Both countries share common membership of the United Nations. Bilaterally the two countries have a Double Tax Convention, and a Strategic partnership.

== History ==
Formal diplomatic relations between Algeria and the United Kingdom were established in 1962, following Algeria's independence from France. The UK was among the early Western countries to recognize Algeria's sovereignty, and both countries opened embassies in each other's capitals shortly thereafter.

Historically, the UK had limited colonial or direct geopolitical involvement in Algeria, which was under French rule for over 130 years. Nevertheless, Britain maintained a keen interest in the North African region during the 19th and 20th centuries, particularly during the era of the Barbary Coast and later during the Second World War, when British forces operated in the Mediterranean.

During the Cold War, relations remained cordial but limited, shaped by Algeria's Non-Aligned Movement posture and close ties with socialist states, while the UK was firmly in the NATO and Western bloc. Diplomatic relations grew stronger after the Cold War, particularly in areas of security cooperation, energy trade, and counter terrorism.

== Political and security cooperation ==
Bilateral political cooperation intensified after the Algerian Civil War (1991–2002), particularly in the context of fighting terrorism and violent extremism. Following the September 11 attacks and the rise of Al-Qaeda in the Maghreb, the UK saw Algeria as a strategic partner in counter terrorism efforts in North Africa and the Sahel.

High-level visits and dialogue mechanisms, including strategic bilateral consultations, have focused on regional stability, migration, and intelligence sharing. Both countries were members of the Union for the Mediterranean, until Brexit.

== Economic relations ==
From 1 September 2005 until 30 December 2020, trade between Algeria and the UK was governed by the Algeria–European Union Association Agreement, while the United Kingdom was a member of the European Union. Following the withdrawal of the United Kingdom from the European Union, the UK offered Algeria a continuity trade agreement based on the EU free trade agreement, however the agreement was signed by neither country.

== Diplomatic missions ==
- Algeria maintains an embassy in London.
- The United Kingdom is accredited to Algeria through its embassy in Algiers.

== See also ==
- Foreign relations of Algeria
- Foreign relations of the United Kingdom
