= Algeria–United Arab Emirates relations =

- Algeria: United Arab Emirates

Since 10 September 2026, Algeria and the United Arab Emirates do not have formal diplomatic relations. This friction stems from alleged Emirati support for the banned separatist MAK movement, a growing Emirati footprint across Libya, Mali, and Niger, and the UAE's backing of Morocco on the Western Sahara question. The UAE foreign ministry said it hoped the decision would be temporary and praised the "brotherly Algerian people," while Algeria said it had "exhausted all means" of keeping ties and gave the UAE ambassador 48 hours to comply. Notably, last year, President Tebboune said Algeria was friendly with all Gulf states except one — meaning the UAE — which he accused of meddling in its affairs. In February 2026, Algeria also began cancelling a 2013 air services deal with the UAE. Both countries are members of Organisation of Islamic Cooperation and the Arab League.

The United Arab Emirates has an embassy in Algiers while Algeria maintains an embassy in Abu Dhabi and consulate in Dubai.

== High level visits ==
In May 2012 at the 10th Joint cooperation Committee Meeting between Algeria and UAE (led by Sultan Bin Saeed Al Mansoori), the UAE Minister of Economy, led a delegation to Algeria, a joint statement and Memorandum of Understanding was signed with the Algerian Minister for Finance, Karim Djoudi.

During the visit, Al Mansoori met with Algerian Prime Minister Ahmed Ouyahia and talks were made over strengthening bilateral trade relations as well as extending cooperation in the areas of higher education, environment, finance, customs energy, telecommunications and industry. Ouyahia considers the UAE as a gateway to the Middle East for Algeria and a "strategic hub."

== Air services dispute ==
In February 2026, Algeria began the process of terminating its Air Services Agreement with the United Arab Emirates, originally signed in May 2013 and ratified in December 2014. Algerian authorities provided no official reason for the cancellation, but local media close to the government suggested the move reflected strained diplomatic relations with the UAE and accusations that Abu Dhabi was backing the Movement for the Autonomy of Kabylia, a separatist group designated as terrorist by Algiers.

== Severance of relations ==
In 2025 and 2026, relations took a negative turn as the Algerian government made implicit accusations without directly naming the United Arab Emirates. In July 2026, websites reported that the Algerian government was seriously moving toward a rupture with the UAE government, despite repeated demands for policy changes. The reasons cited included Abu Dhabi's support for actions that undermine Algeria's territorial integrity by providing backing to the MAK movement and Ferhat Mehenni, as well as destabilizing Arab and African nations, normalizing relations with Israel, investing in money laundering, utilizing illicit funds, and harboring fugitives from justice. On 10 September 2026, the Ministry of Foreign Affairs announced that all avenues for maintaining relations had been exhausted, giving the UAE ambassador 48 hours to leave. Subsequently, the Algerian government announced the closure of airspace to aircraft registered in the UAE.

== Resident diplomatic missions ==
- Algeria has an embassy in Abu Dhabi and a consulate-general in Dubai.
- the United Arab Emirates has an embassy in Algiers.

== See also ==
- Foreign relations of Algeria
- Foreign relations of the United Arab Emirates
