= Algeria–Brazil relations =

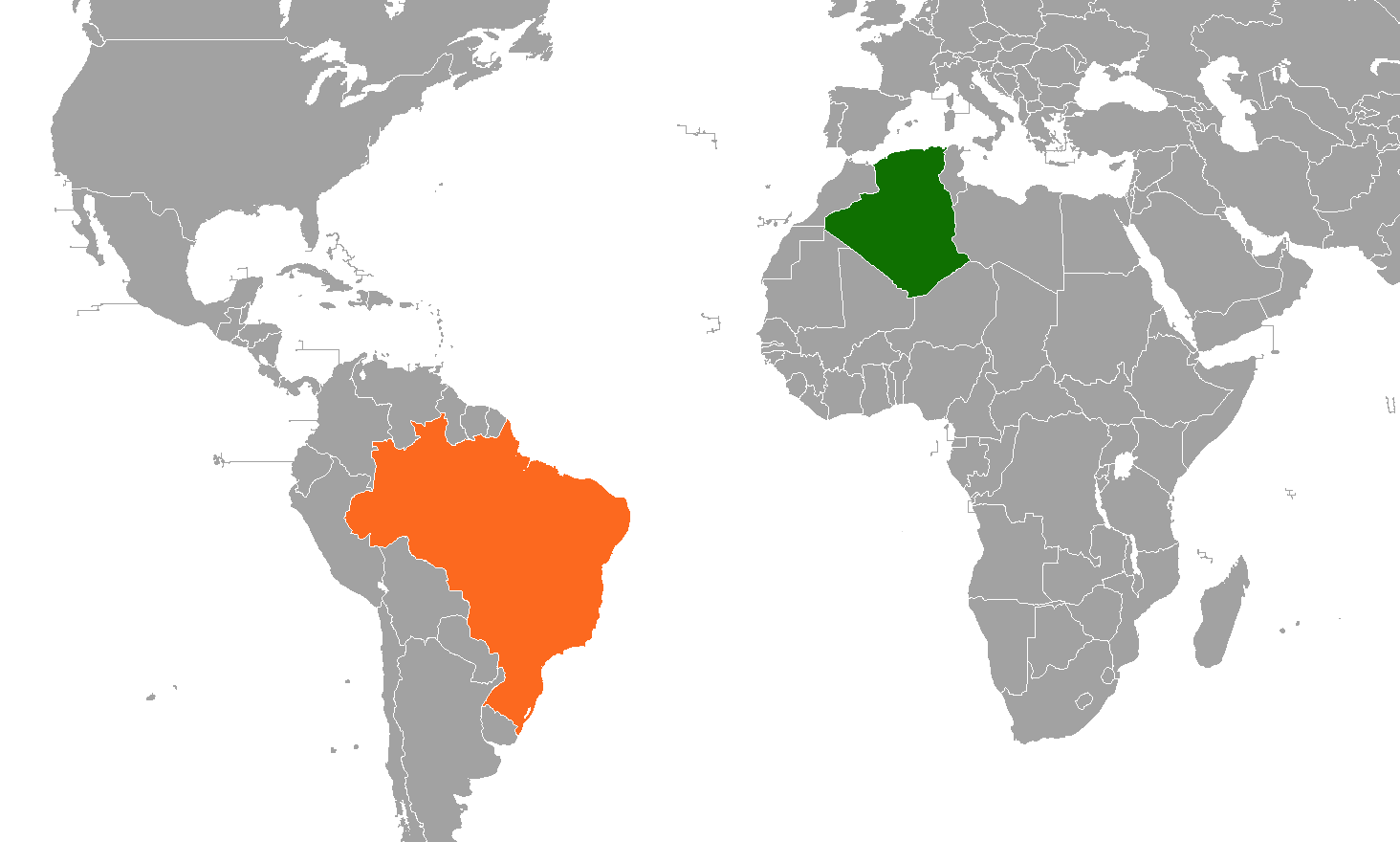
- Brazil: Algeria

Diplomatic mission
- Brazilian embassy, Algiers: Algerian embassy, Brasilia

There are bilateral relations between Algeria and Brazil; the two countries are members of the Group of 15, Group of 24, Group of 77 and the United Nations They have a generally friendly relationship and are big trading partners.

== History ==
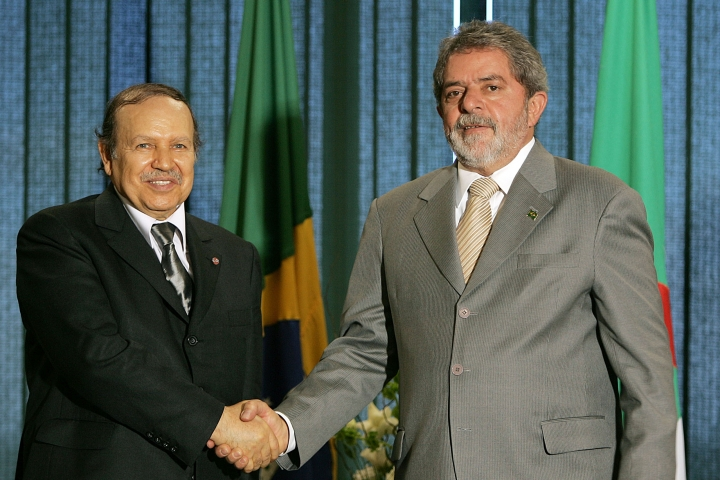
Algerian President Abdelaziz Bouteflika and Brazilian President Luiz Inácio Lula da Silva in Brasília; 2005.

Brazil recognized and established diplomatic relations with Algeria following their independence from France in 1962. Brazil opened an embassy in Algiers in 1963. During the Military dictatorship in Brazil (1964–1985), several Brazilians sought political asylum in Algeria. After the fall of the military dictatorship, most Brazilians returned to their country.

In November 1983, Brazilian President João Figueiredo paid a visit to Algeria. In 2005, Algerian President Abdelaziz Bouteflika paid a visit to Brazil and met with President Luiz Inácio Lula da Silva. In February 2006, Brazilian President Luiz Inácio Lula da Silva paid an official visit to Algeria and met with President Abdelaziz Bouteflika.

Brazil established a permanent link with Algeria through the work of Brazilian architect Oscar Niemeyer. Two of Niemeyer's projects devoted to Algeria were carried out at the University of Constantine and at the University of Science and Technology Houari Boumediene. Niemeyer's work in Algeria helped to create a feeling of solidarity between the two countries and reinforced the mutual admiration between the two peoples.

== Trade ==
In 2019, two-way trade between both nations totaled US$2.3 billion. Algeria's main exports to Brazil include: crude petroleum oils and urea. Brazil's main exports to Algeria include: cane sugar; iron ore; crude soybean oil; corn; refrigerated beef; and coffee.

== Resident diplomatic missions ==
- Algeria has an embassy in Brasília.
- Brazil has an embassy in Algiers.
