= Algeria–Indonesia relations =

- Algeria: Indonesia

Algeria and Indonesia established diplomatic relations in 1963. The relationship is mostly founded on common religious and anti-colonialism solidarity, as Indonesia and Algeria are Muslim-majority countries that also once fell under colonialism. Algeria recognized Indonesia's role on supporting their country on gaining independence in 1962. Both countries agreed on expanding cooperations and strengthening relations. Algeria has an embassy in Jakarta that also accredited to Singapore and Brunei, while Indonesia has an embassy in Algiers. Both nations are members of the Non-Aligned Movement, Group of 77 and Organisation of Islamic Cooperation (OIC).

== History ==
Indonesia has actively supported Algeria on their struggle for independence by established Committee of Supporting Independence Struggle of North African Countries, chaired by Prime Minister of Indonesia Mohammad Natsir in 1951. In 1955 Indonesia organized the Asian-African Conference in Bandung which call for the independence and decolonialization of Asian and African countries from European colonialism. Although at that time Algeria was still a French colony, Indonesia invited Algerian delegation to attend the Bandung conference and it has inspired them on their struggle. Algeria finally claimed independence from France on July 5, 1962. Promptly, Indonesia was one of the first countries which recognized the independence of Algeria, and its embassy was among the first embassies opened in Algiers on 1963.

== Trade and commerce ==
Algeria is Indonesia's fourth largest trade partner in Africa after South Africa, Nigeria and Egypt, in 2011 the trade value reached US$489.05 million accounted for 5.06 percent of Indonesia's total trade with Africa. Indonesian main exports are palm oil, coffee, sugar, textile fiber, dried fish and wood, while importing crude oil from Algeria.

== See also ==
- Foreign relations of Algeria
- Foreign relations of Indonesia
