= Algeria–Sudan relations =

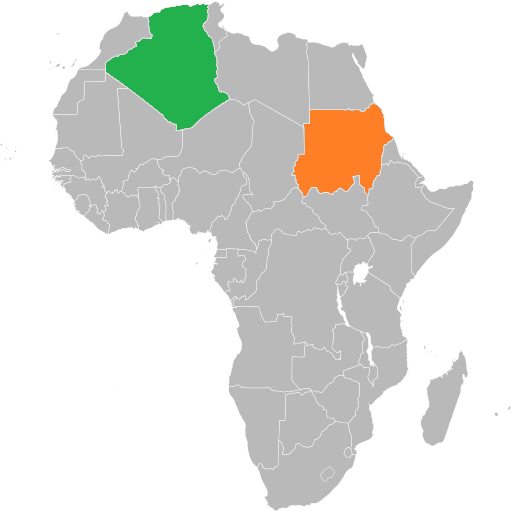

- Algeria: Sudan

Despite both being in the core of the Arab nationalist movement, Algeria and Sudan have been greatly different from each other. Algeria tends to be secular, but Sudan is much more Islamist-oriented and has an unstable relationship with neighboring countries like Egypt, Chad, Ethiopia, Libya, and South Sudan. Therefore, there has been a lack of cooperation between the two nations. Nonetheless, the two countries have been expanding their relations.

Algeria has an embassy in Khartoum while Sudan has an embassy in Algiers. Before 2011, Sudan and Algeria were respectively, the first and second largest African countries as well as the first and second largest Arab countries, but after 2011, Algeria became the largest African and Arab country.

== Algerian Civil War ==
Sudan was accused by Algeria for meddling into the Algerian Civil War that caused the death of 200,000 Algerians. Alongside Sudan, Iran, Saudi Arabia, Libya and Morocco were also involved on supporting the Armed Islamic Group of Algeria. Thus this was the reason for the souring relationship between two nations. In response, Algerian Government had called for the separation of Darfur and South Sudan, which later South Sudan achieved in 2011.

== Current relations ==
=== Sudanese Civil War ===
Since the end of the Algerian Civil conflict, Algeria and Sudan had reapproached relations, but mistrusts remain high. Nonetheless, Algeria had offered to assist Sudan amidst the long-decades Sudanese Civil War.

=== Libyan crisis ===
Sudan and Algeria have both called to end the current Libyan crisis in order to maintain peace and stability of Libya at the height of Libyan wars.

== See also ==
- Foreign relations of Algeria
- Foreign relations of Sudan
