= Algeria–South Africa relations =

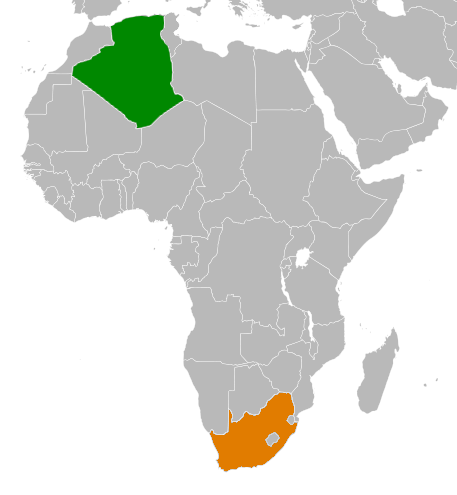
- Algeria: South Africa

The political relations between Algeria and South Africa officially started in the 1950s and 1960s. The bond formed around their respective internal conflicts that were repeatedly neglected by the United Nations Security Council.

== History ==
In 1961, with a fake Ethiopian passport, Nelson Mandela traveled to Algeria where he was trained by the armed forces of the Algerian National Liberation Front (FLN). In his book Long Walk to Freedom, he reveals his struggle against the apartheid was greatly inspired by the struggle of the Algerian soldiers. The FLN then provided the African National Congress with weapons. Returning to Algiers in 1990, Mandela declared «The Algerian army made me a man». Algeria was the first country visited by Mandela after his release.

In November 1964, the University of Algiers conferred an honorary Doctorate of Literature to South African activist Albert Lutuli.

In 1974, in support to the anti-apartheid movement, the Minister of Foreign Affairs of Algeria Abdelaziz Bouteflika successfully lobbied for the expulsion of the South Africa representation from the United Nations General Assembly that he presided that year. He successfully argued that South Africa's delegates were invalid because they represented only a white minority.

An ANC-backer, Algeria bought weapons and surveillance equipment from South Africa (for over $15 million in 1997, $51.3 million in 1999, SA's top client that year) to fight its own Civil War. In November 1997, the South African Embassy was established in Algiers. The Algerian-South African High Binational Commission for Cooperation (HCBNC) was created in September 2000.

== Economic relations ==
Between 2011 and 2015, Algeria was South Africa's largest trading partner in Northern Africa (43% of SA's total trades in the region). South Africa exports to Algeria were estimated at R13 billion, while Algeria exports to South Africa were estimated around R463 million.

== Resident diplomatic missions ==
- Algeria has an embassy in Pretoria.
- South Africa has an embassy in Algiers.

== Related pages ==
- Foreign relations of Algeria
- Foreign relations of South Africa
- Algerian Ambassador to South Africa
- Morocco–South Africa relations
