= Algeria–Japan relations =

- Algeria: Japan

Algeria and Japan have held diplomatic relations since Japan recognized Algerian independence from France in 1962. Algeria has an embassy in Tokyo whilst Japan has an embassy in Algiers. Japanese form a small expatriate community in Algeria. As of 2023, 45 Japanese nationals reside in the country, and 271 Algerians live in Japan.

== Overview ==
Japan is interested to contribute to Algeria's economic development as they are interested in the fact that Algeria possesses major energy resources and has a large internal market. There are Japanese companies which are interested in the Algerian five-year plan for 2009–2014, which provides for public investments of 286 billion dollars, notably to modernise and develop essential infrastructure. Many Japanese employees of these companies came to Algeria for various projects.

In 2010, Algeria withheld 100 billion yen ($1.2 billion) in payments owed to Japanese contractors for a highway construction project in the country as it was alleged that the companies had failed to meet the terms of the contract.

In November 2017, Algeria started exporting liquefied natural gas (LNG) to Japan.

== Trade ==
In 2023, Algerian exports to Japan totaled an estimated ¥66.9 billion. Japan mainly imports mineral fuels, petroleum, natural and manufactured gas, crude oil, and metal ores. Algerian imports from Japan that year were worth ¥10.9 billion. Japanese exports to Algeria include iron and steel products, machinery, chemicals, and transportation goods.

== Resident diplomatic missions ==
- Algeria has an embassy in Tokyo.
- Japan has an embassy in Algiers.

== See also ==
- Foreign relations of Algeria
- Foreign relations of Japan
- Japanese foreign policy on Africa
