= Algeria–Qatar relations =

- Algeria: Qatar

Diplomatic mission
- Embassy of Algeria, Doha: Embassy of Qatar, Algiers

Algerian–Qatar relations refer to the diplomatic relationship between Qatar and Algeria. Algeria has an embassy in Doha. Qatar has an embassy in Algiers.

Both countries are members of the Arab League, and traditionally they have maintained a friendly relationship, although Algeria has had some diplomatic disputes with Qatar over Al Jazeera's coverage of Algeria.

== Current relations ==
=== Libyan crisis ===
Amidst the crisis of Libya, Algeria's neighbor, and Qatar's involvement, Algeria has expressed significant concerns of Libya's insecurity and has shared opposition to Qatar's involvement in Libya, although not directly. There have been significant political arguments between the two countries.

Algeria was believed to have been trying to expand Algerian influences of their own against Qatar's interests, with the clear evidence in Mali when Algeria has gained significant upper hands during the Northern Mali conflict at the expense of Qatar.

=== Syrian and Yemeni Civil Wars ===
Algeria and Qatar have different views, when Algeria opposes any type of arming for the rebels in Syria while Qatar firmly supports the opposition in Syria; so the same thing happens in Yemen.

In 2016, Qatar and Saudi Arabia's defense ministers both respectively visited Algeria discussing for Algeria's military commitment in the Saudi-led coalition, but Algeria had refused to participate although they might provide intelligences for the Saudi and Qatar militaries in Yemen.

In both occasions, Algeria called for mediations between parties involved.

=== 2017 Qatar diplomatic crisis ===
Algeria has stayed neutral and called for mediations between Qatar and Saudi Arabia, and takes a firmly independent step in the situation. Giving the historical issues with both Qatar and Saudi Arabia, Algeria doesn't favor anyone in the conflict.

Qatar has appreciated Algeria's stance and called it "honorable".

=== COVID-19 pandemic ===
During the COVID-19 pandemic, Qatar sent urgent medical assistance, including respirators, and ventilators to Algeria in October 2021.

== Resident diplomatic missions ==
- Algeria has an embassy in Doha.
- Qatar has an embassy in Algiers.

== See also ==
- Foreign relations of Algeria
- Foreign relations of Qatar
