= List of ambassadors of Algeria to South Africa =

Coordinates: 25.748041°S 28.226911°E

Ambassador of Algeria to South Africa
- Incumbent "Vacant"
- Inaugural holder: Saïd Kitouni
- Formation: January 1, 1996

The Algerian ambassador in Pretoria is the official representative of the Government in Algiers to the Government of South Africa.

== List of representatives ==
Diplomatic accreditation	Ambassador	Observations	President of Algeria	President of South Africa	Term end
January 1, 1966		Algeria broke diplomatic relations with the United Kingdom and was part of the group of eight member countries of the Organisation of African Unity who promise to send their army to fight the initiative of Ian Smith.	Houari Boumedienne	Charles Robberts Swart	
January 1, 1996	Saïd Kitouni	On February 19, 1996 Algeria lodged a formal protest after Nelson Mandela met Anwar Haddam in Cape Town the week before, and threatened to recall its ambassador, Mr. Said Kitouni.	Liamine Zéroual	Nelson Mandela	
October 28, 2004	Mourad Bencheikh	(*1934 Laghouat): Algerian Ambassador to South Africa, Algerian representative to the Food and Agriculture Organization in Rome.; From January 1, 2008 to October 2011 he was Algerian Ambassador to Kenya.; From 2002 to October 28, 2004 he was Algerian Ambassador to Germany.; On August 31, 2010 he became Algerian Ambassador to Morocco.	Abdelaziz Bouteflika	Thabo Mbeki	January 1, 2008
October 1, 2013	Abd-El-Naceur Belaid	A-EL-N Belaid	Abdelaziz Bouteflika	Jacob Zuma	2018

== See also ==
- Algeria–South Africa relations
