= Algeria–Syria relations =

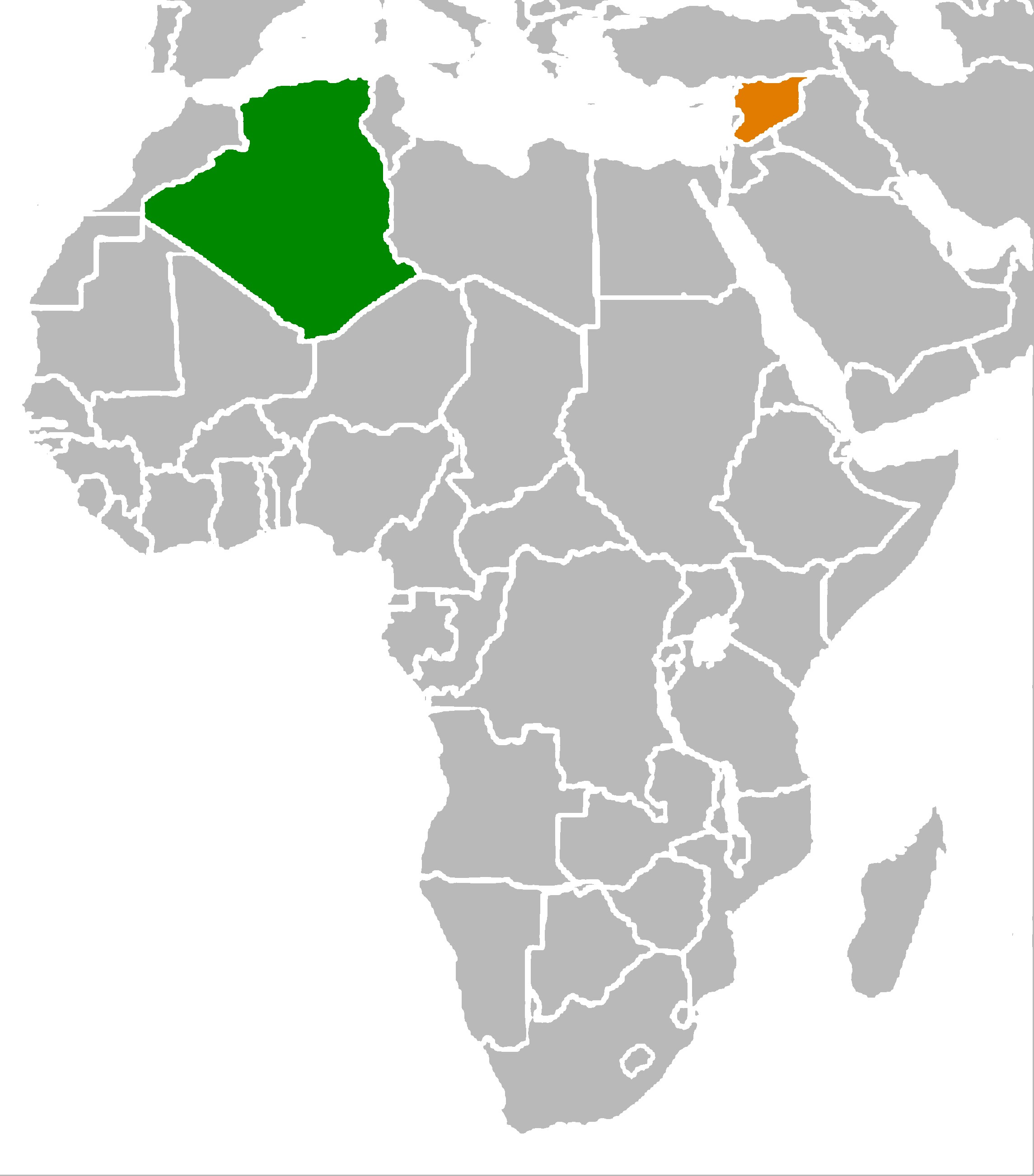
- Algeria: Syria

Diplomatic mission
- Embassy of Algeria, Damascus: Embassy of Syria, Algiers

Algeria–Syria relations refers to the relationship between Algeria and Syria. Algeria has an embassy in Damascus; while Syria has an embassy in Algiers. Both are members of the Arab League. During the Syrian civil war, Algeria was one of the few Arab countries that maintained close ties with Ba'athist Syria under Bashar al-Assad, and has defended Syria within the Arab League.

== History ==
The struggle of Algerians against French colonialism during the Algerian War drew inspirations from the other Arab states such as Syria. With such, following the independence of Algeria in 1962 and the 1963 Syrian coup d'état, the two countries established relations. Both countries established diplomatic relations on 27 August 1962.

=== Syrian Civil War ===
During the civil war in Syria, Algeria has maintained diplomatic ties and opposed any plan to arm the opposition. From the Algerian state's point of view, the Syrian war and the rise of fundamentalism caused significant concerns. According to commentators, this is a legacy of the tensions between Algeria and Saudi Arabia over the Algerian Civil War. As such, Algeria has vehemently opposed the other Arab countries' decisions to arm the Syrian opposition amidst the conflict in Syria due to Algeria's historical trauma, and quietly supports the Syrian Government.

Algeria had also acted as mediator between Syria and Turkey. As of 2015, Algeria has received nearly 25,000 Syrian refugees fleeing the country. Most Syrians in Algeria are now working in small and medium businesses.

Since 2019, Algeria has been lobbying for the restoration of Syria's full membership in the Arab League. In 2021, a joint Syria-Algeria Cooperation Committee was created, both countries later took an advanced step to raise this committee to the level of a joint higher cooperation committee under the leadership of both Prime Ministers by signing a significant number of agreements, protocols, memoranda of understanding and various programs that cover economic and cultural sectors. In 2022, the Algeria-Syria Business Council was established with the aim of strengthening economic relations between the two countries.

In July 2022, Foreign Minister Faisal Mekdad made an official visit to Algeria on the occasion of the 60th anniversary of Algerian independence. As part of it, he met with the President of Algeria Abdelmadjid Tebboune, Foreign Minister Ramtane Lamamra and the President of the Council of the Nation of Algeria Salah Goudjil. On 25 July 2022, Algerian Foreign Minister Lamamra made a reciprocal visit, during which he held talks with President Assad and Foreign Minister Faisal Mekdad.

=== Earthquake ===
Following the Turkey-Syria earthquakes in February 2023, Algeria delivered tons of urgent relief aid to Syria including medicine, and food, as well as paramedics and doctors. In addition, the Algerian Red Crescent prepared an air bridge to Syria.

=== Post-Assad relations ===
On February 8, 2025, President Ahmed al-Sharaa met in Damascus with Algerian Foreign Minister Ahmed Attaf. The ministry stated that the purpose of the visit was to strengthen relations between Algeria and Syria and explore ways to elevate their bilateral ties to the highest level. This visit marked the first by an Algerian official to Syria since the fall of the Assad regime in December 2024.

== See also ==
- Foreign relations of Algeria
- Foreign relations of Syria
