= Algeria–India relations =

Bilateral relations

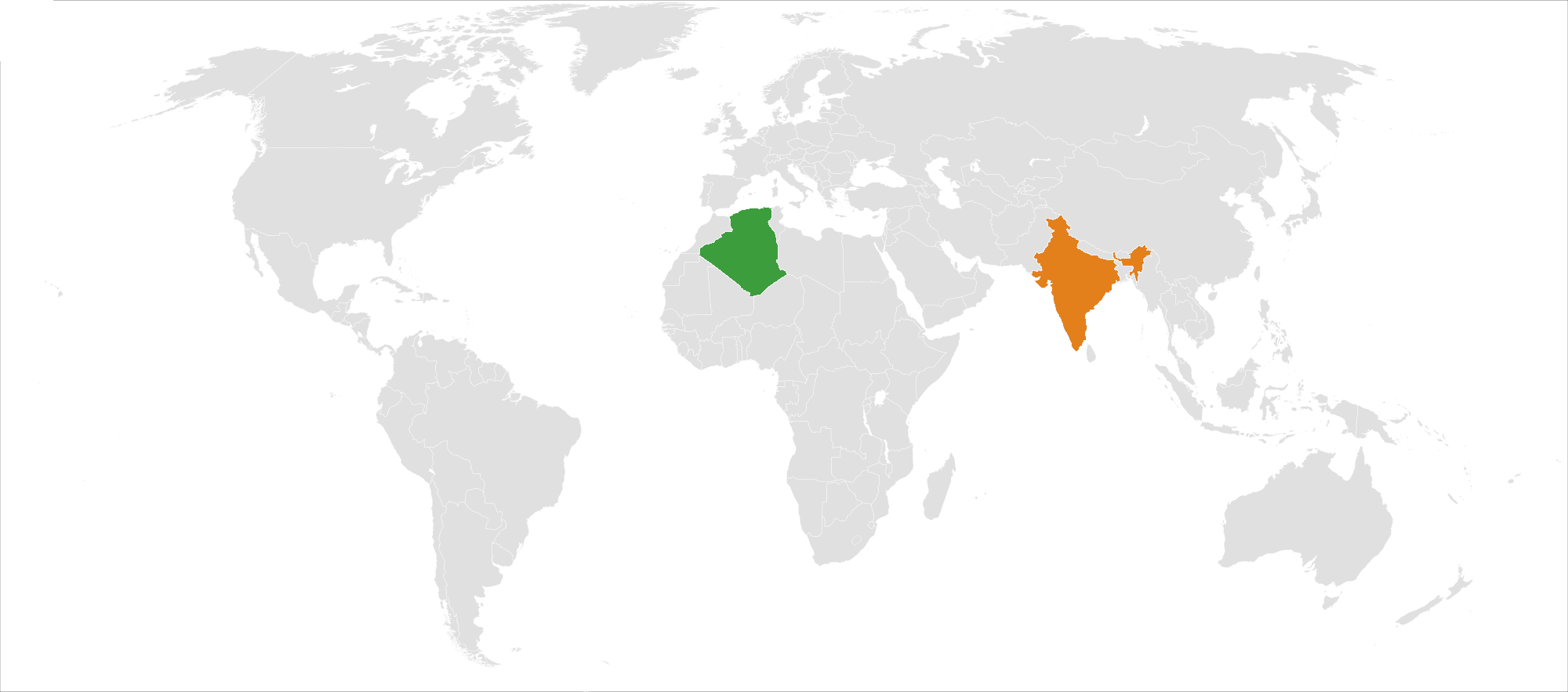
- Algeria: India

Diplomatic mission
- Embassy of Algeria, New Delhi: Embassy of India, Algiers

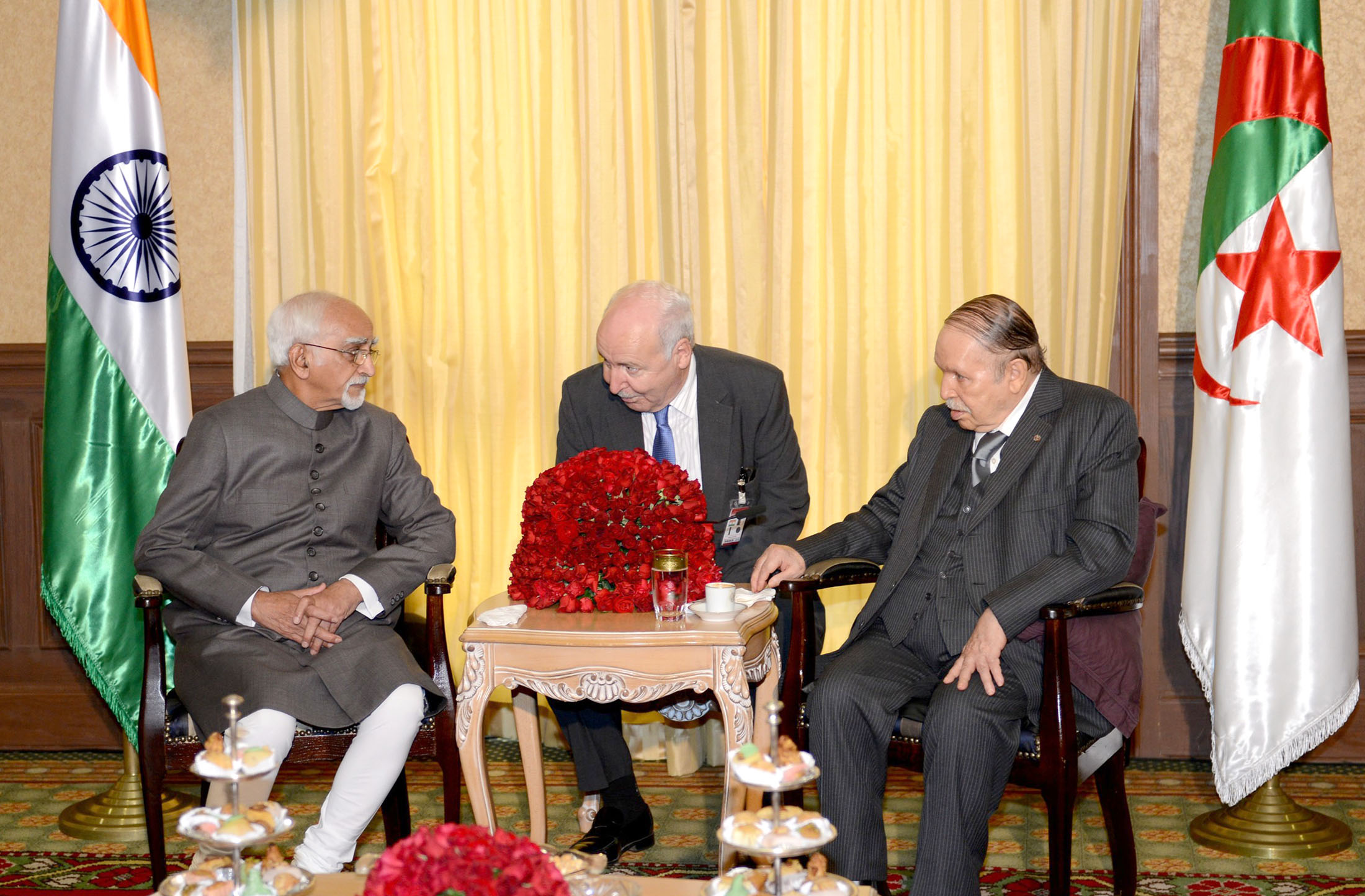
Indian Vice President Hamid Ansari meeting Algerian President Abdelaziz Bouteflika in Algiers; October 2016.

Algeria and India maintain diplomatic relations. Algeria has an embassy in New Delhi, and India has an embassy in Algiers.

== History ==
India supported the independence of Algeria from French colonial rule, and supported the National Liberation Front (FLN) during the Algerian War (1954-62). The FLN had an office in India during the late 1950s and early 1960s. Diplomatic relations between Algeria and India were established in July 1962, the same month that the former gained independence from France.

India and Algeria joined the Non-Aligned Movement (NAM) in 1961, and have been members ever since. There have been several high level visits by the leaders of the two countries. Prime Minister Indira Gandhi visited Algeria in September 1973 to attend the 4th NAM Summit. Prime Minister Rajiv Gandhi visited Algeria in June 1985. Algerian President Chadli Bendjedid visited India in April 1982, 1983, and again in 1987. President Abdelaziz Bouteflika was the chief guest at the Republic Day parade in January 2001.

As a member of the African Union, Algeria supports India's candidacy for a permanent seat in a reformed United Nations Security Council.

== Economic relations ==
Bilateral trade between Algeria and India fluctuated between 2013 and 2018. Bilateral trade totaled US$2.12 billion in 2013, dipped to $1.37 billion in 2015, before recovering to $2.92 billion in 2018. The main commodities exported by India to Algeria are knock-down kits for assembly industries, chickpeas, semi-whitened rice and parboiled rice, serums, boned frozen bovine meat, polyethylene terephthalate, pneumatics for tractors, antibiotics and granite blocks. The major commodities imported by India from Algeria are oil, gas, lubricants and phosphate.

Several Indian companies have operations in Algeria. Larsen & Toubro, KEC International, Kalpataru and Vijay Electricals are active in the power transmission sector, and Dodsal Engineering and Construction FZE in the oil and gas sector. Construction company Shapoorji Pallonji and pharmaceutical companies such as Zydus Cadila, Dabur, Sun Pharma, Cipla, and Hetro Drugs have a presence in Algeria. Pharmaccess executes engineering, production and construction (EPC) projects for Algerian companies. Engineers India Ltd. and IRCON International have executed projects in Algeria.

Maruti Suzuki has a significant market in Algeria, with it being its third largest export market and exporting nearly 17,247 cars in the year 2011-12.

== Bilateral cooperation and assistance ==
India provided Algeria with US$1 million as humanitarian aid for the victims of the earthquake which struck Algeria in May 2003. Medicines worth half a million US dollars were handed over in April 2004 and the balance in the form of construction steel for the houses for the victims was handed over in October 2006. The Indian Space Research Organisation launched the Algerian satellite Alsat 2A into orbit in July 2010.

== Indians in Algeria ==
There were around 5,700 Indians living in Algeria as of September 2019. Most of the community are technically skilled workers on projects in remote areas. Only a small number of Indians live in the capital city of Algiers, primarily the regional heads of companies. There are also 20 overseas citizens of India in the country.

== Algerian Embassy ==
The Algerian embassy is located in New Delhi.

- Ambassador Dr. Ali Achoui

== Indian Embassy ==
The Indian embassy is located in Algiers.

- Ambassador Gaurav Singh, G.S. Ahluwalia

== See also ==
- Foreign relations of Algeria
- Foreign relations of India
- Embassy of India, Algiers
