= Algeria–Saudi Arabia relations =

- Algeria: Saudi Arabia

Diplomatic mission
- Embassy of Algeria, Riyadh: Embassy of Saudi Arabia, Algiers

Algeria and Saudi Arabia are, respectively, the first and second largest Arab states although Algeria is a North African country while Saudi Arabia is a West Asian country.

== History and political relations ==
Algeria has an embassy in Riyadh and a consulate general in Jeddah,while Saudi Arabia has an embassy in Algiers. Both countries are the members of the Arab League and the OPEC.

Saudi Arabia actively supported the Algerian revolution in 1954 that led to the emancipation of Algeria from the French occupation. On 24 November 1986 two countries signed economic, cultural and technical agreements. In March 1987 the ruler of Saudi Arabia, King Fahd, paid an official visit to Algiers and met President Chadli Bendjedid. During the 1980s Algerian young people were sent by the Algerian government to Saudi Arabia for education in the Islamic sciences. This strengthened the Da’wa Salafism, a Salafi inspired social movement, in Algeria.

During the invasion of Kuwait by Iraq in 1990 Algeria did not openly oppose the intervention against Kuwait leading to tense relations with Saudi Arabia which defended Kuwait.

Unlike Saudi Arabia, Algeria did not support the decision of the Arab League to assist Arab states that armed opposition groups in the Syrian civil war that began in 2011. Algeria also refused to back the Saudi-led coalition against the Houthis amidst the war in Yemen.

=== Algerian Civil War ===
In 1992, Saudi Arabia backed the Algerian army's coup against the government following the Islamic Salvation Front's victory in the 1991 Algerian legislative election.

=== Qatar–Saudi Arabia standoff ===
Algeria has favored a resolution of political agreement between Qatar and Saudi Arabia, therefore portraying themselves as a neutral party during the Qatar crisis.

=== Mohammed bin Salman's visit to Algeria in 2018 ===
Mohammed bin Salman, the Crown Prince of Saudi Arabia, paid a two-day visit to Algeria as part of his tour across the Arab World in November 2018, in which he and Ahmed Ouyahia signed an economic cooperation, security and trade pacts. However, his trip to Algeria was marred with the wake of the murder of Jamal Khashoggi, with a number of Algerians openly protesting against his visit, and the host also welcomed him coldly with President Abdelaziz Bouteflika refusing to meet him, citing flu as a health reason for his refusal.

Saudi Arabia attempted to improve once-strained ties with Algeria following the deterioration of Morocco–Saudi Arabia relations in late 2018 and early 2019, including shifting towards the Algerian stance on the Western Sahara dispute.

Crown Prince Mohammed bin Salman and King Salman of Saudi Arabia reportedly differed on the 2019 Algerian protests, with the King favouring freer coverage of the protests in the Saudi press, while the Crown Prince endorsed a hardline approach towards suppressing the protests.

== Economic ties ==
Saudi Arabia established the Saudi Fund for Development in Algeria. There is also the Algerian-Saudi joint committee which organizes meetings between two countries. Between 1987 and the invasion of Kuwait in 1990 Algeria enjoyed financial support of Saudi Arabia.

As of 2012 Saudi Arabia had investments in Algeria in pharmacological, cement, mineral, paper and chemical fields which amounted SR3.5 billion. It was SR3 billion, equal to $856 million, in 2011.

== Resident diplomatic missions ==
- Algeria has an embassy in Riyadh and a consulate-general in Jeddah.
- Saudi Arabia has an embassy in Algiers.

== See also ==
- Foreign relations of Algeria
- Foreign relations of Saudi Arabia
