= Algeria–Cyprus relations =

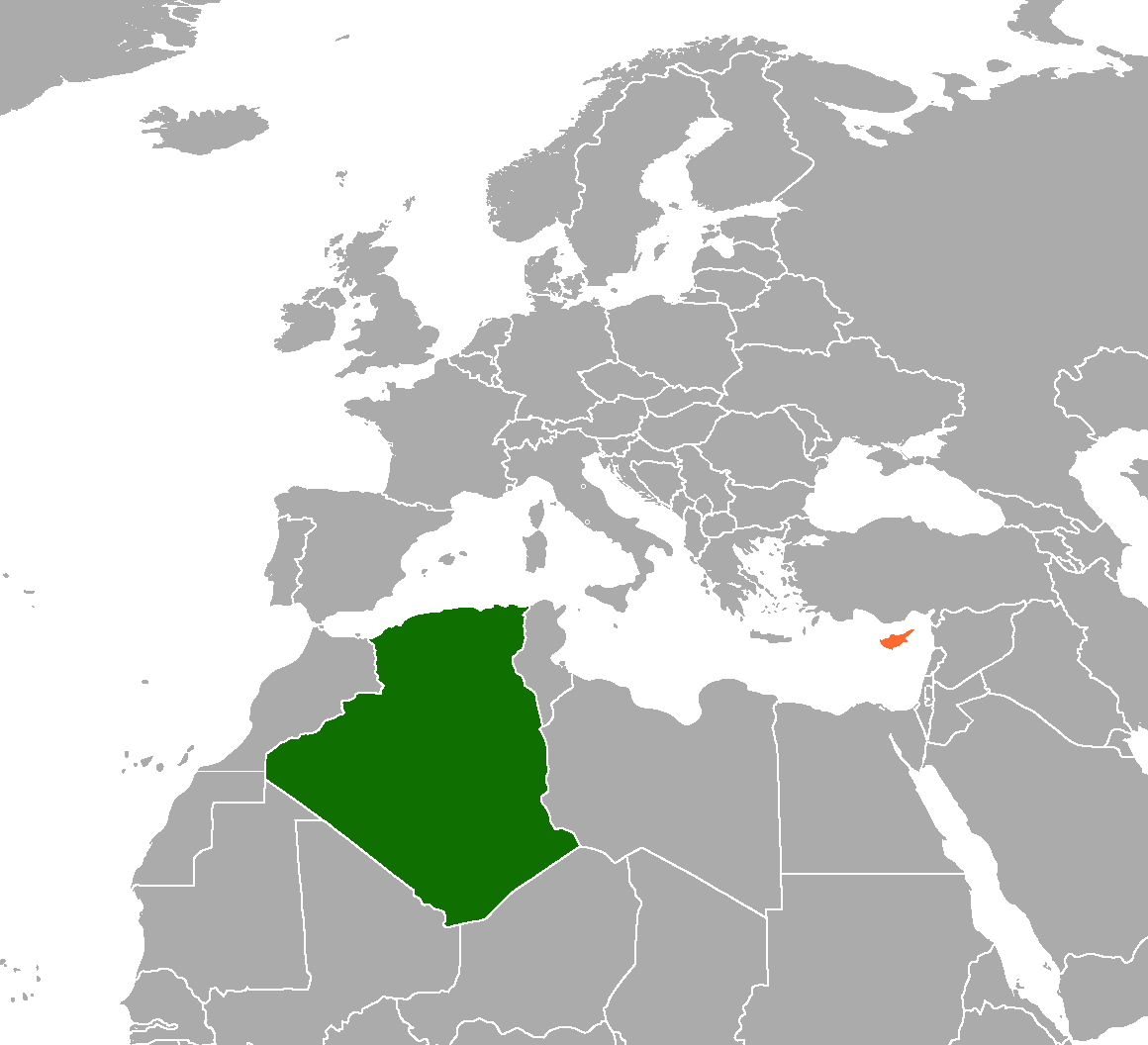
- Algeria: Cyprus

Algeria–Cyprus relations are to the bilateral relations between Algeria and Cyprus. Algeria is represented in Cyprus through its embassy in Beirut, Lebanon. Cyprus is represented in Algeria through its embassy in Paris, France. Both countries are full members of the Union for the Mediterranean.

== Official meetings ==
When presenting his credentials to the Cyprus President Tassos Papadopoulos in January 2005, Algeria's Beirut-based Ambassador to Cyprus Ibrahim Benaouda Haci said that Algeria's President Abdelaziz Bouteflika confirmed his willingness to strengthen the relations between Algeria and Cyprus. In October 2006, the ambassador of Cyprus, Minas Hadjimichael presented his credentials to the president of Algeria, Abdelaziz Bouteflika, thanked him for Algeria's support to Cyprus in the framework of the United Nations and the Non-Aligned Movement, and discussed ways to enhance bilateral ties. The president of Algeria said he was satisfied with the friendly relations between the two countries, but stressed that his country favored reunification of the Cyprus Republic. He also expressed his wish for enhancing bilateral cooperation.

Algeria has consistently supported the reunification of Cyprus based on UN resolutions. In an April 2005 meeting with Turkish Foreign Minister Abdullah Gul in Algeria, President Bouteflika said he supports Turkey on the Cyprus problem, and considers that Turkey has done everything they could be expected to do to solve the Cyprus problem.

In November 1998, the Algerian foreign minister met his Greek Cypriot counterpart.

In February 2001, the Algerian foreign minister visited Cyprus.

In November 2001, the president of the Republic of Cyprus, Glafcos Clerides received the credentials of the new Ambassador of Algeria Ahmed Boudehri.

In September 2003, the Cypriot president and the heads of Algeria, Senegal, Kuwait met to discuss regional issues.

== Agreements ==
Cyprus and Algeria have concluded various agreements. For example, in November 1997, Algeria and Cyprus agreed on a framework for maritime exchanges between the two countries, lifting obstacles on the free movement of ships and offering preferential treatment at the ports in both countries. In December 1999, Algeria and Cyprus signed an air transport agreement to introduce a legal framework governing air routes between Algeria and Cyprus. In July 2000, Algerian news agency APS signed a cooperation agreement with the Cypriot news agency that covers exchange of English news items and photographs.

== Economic relations ==
In December 2001, the Algerian firm Sonatrach and Cyprus oil company Medex Petroleum signed an exploration deal covering the north of Bordj Omar Idriss in the Illizi basin in south-eastern Algeria.

Cyprus is considering Algeria as a potential partner to assist with extracting untapped oil and gas from the island's exclusive economic zone. Other partners being considered are Libya, Russian and Algeria – full details of the negotiations have not yet been released to the public domain.

== See also ==
- Foreign relations of Algeria
- Foreign relations of Cyprus
