= Algeria–Germany relations =

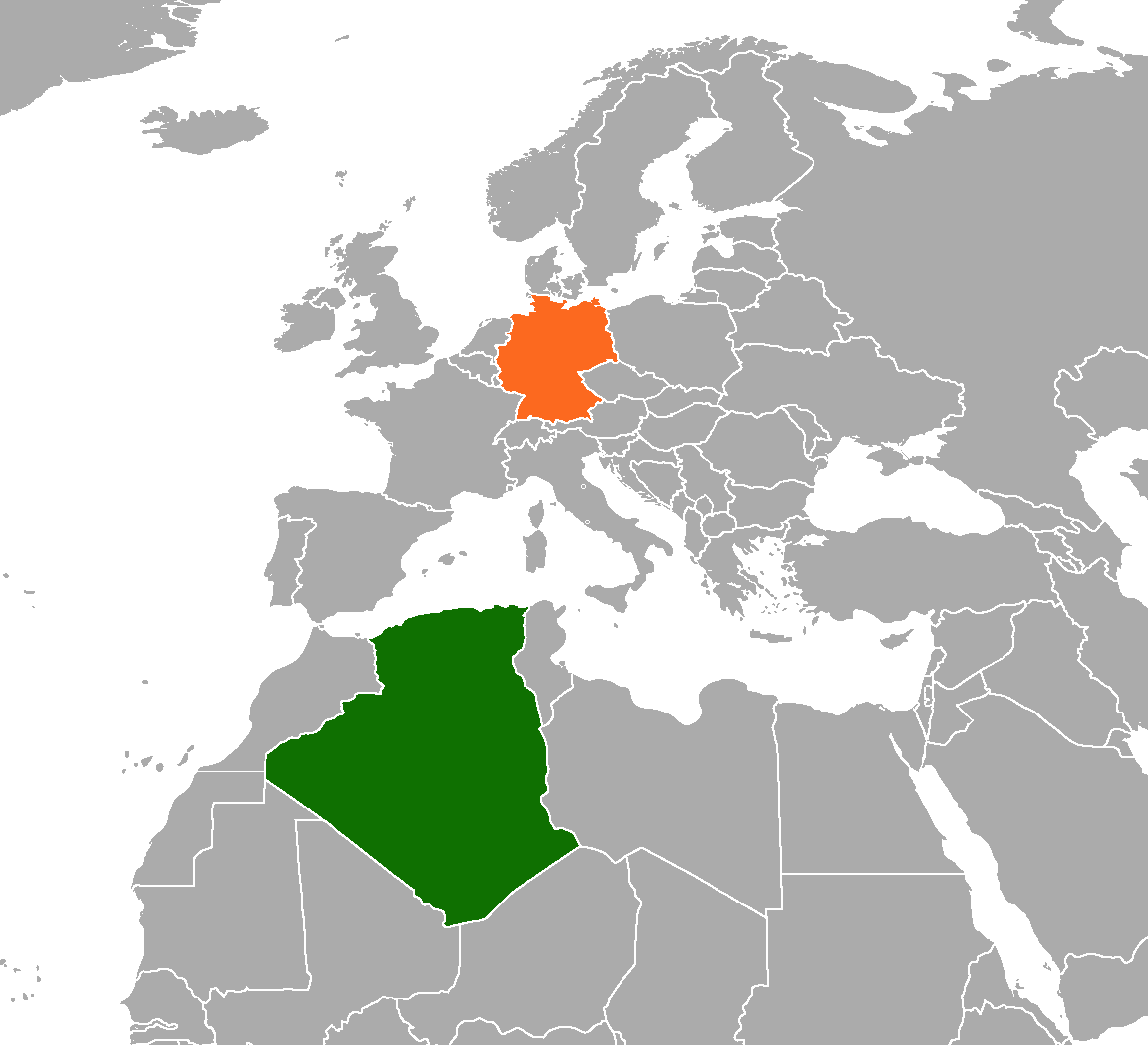

- Algeria: Germany

Relations between Germany and Algeria are described as "good" by the German Federal Foreign Office. Germany is among Algeria's most important trading partners. The two countries concluded an energy partnership in 2015.

== History ==
In 1898, the German Empire established a consulate general in what was then French Algeria. During World War II, Algeria became a theater of war for the German Afrikakorps, which fought against the Allied powers. After World War II, the French colonial power faced an uprising that leads to the outbreak of the Algerian War in 1954. German arms dealer Georg Puchert played an important role in supplying the National Liberation Front with explosives and weapons. Algeria was able to gain its independence from France in 1962. With the country's independence, the existing consulate general of the Federal Republic of Germany (West Germany), established in 1956, was transformed into an embassy.

Two years after the country's independence, on May 14. 1965, Algeria broke off relations with West Germany. The reason for this was the establishment of diplomatic relations with Israel on the part of West Germany. Five years later, official relations were established instead with the German Democratic Republic (East Germany). In 1971, diplomatic relations were resumed with West Germany after the latter abandoned the Hallstein Doctrine.

In 2001, Abdelaziz Bouteflika became the first Algerian president to visit Germany. In the following years, bilateral investment protection agreements (2002) and a double taxation agreement (2008) were signed. In 2007, Horst Köhler was the first German state guest to visit Algeria, and a year later, German Chancellor Angela Merkel also visited Algiers. In the 2010s, a further intensification of economic relations between the two countries takes place with the establishment of a joint economic commission (2011) and the agreement of an energy partnership.

== Economic relations ==
The total volume of trade between Algeria and Germany in 2021 was 2.6 billion euros, ranking Algeria 64th in the ranking of German trading partners. Imports from Algeria amounted to 774 million euros and exports to Algeria totaled 1.8 billion euros. Germany mainly supplies automobiles, vehicle parts, machinery, and chemical products, and in return mainly imports petroleum and petrochemical products.

Nearly 200 German companies have a presence in Algeria, including Volkswagen AG, which opened a car assembly plant near the city of Oran in 2017.

== Cultural relations ==
A Goethe-Institut has existed in Algiers since 1963, reopening in 2002 after a temporary closure. Its focus is on educational cooperation and the promotion of the German language. Nearly 48,000 Algerians learn German as a foreign language.

Since 2008, the German Archaeological Institute has cooperated with the Algerian National Museum of Cherchell.

== Sports ==
The 1982 FIFA World Cup and 2014 FIFA World Cup national teams of Algeria and Germany each met in the World Cup. In 1982, Algeria defeated Germany 2-1 in the group stage. Later, Algeria was nevertheless eliminated in the group stages due to the so-called Disgrace of Gijon. In 2014, Germany met Algeria in the round of 16 and narrowly won the match 2-1 after 120 minutes of play and later won the tournament.

== Military relations ==
Between 2009 and 2020, Germany supplied Algeria with several billion dollars' worth of weapons, including helicopters, military vehicles, frigates, and torpedoes.

== Diplomatic missions ==
- Algiers has an embassy in Berlin and a consulate-general in Frankfurt am Main.
- Germany has an embassy in Algiers.
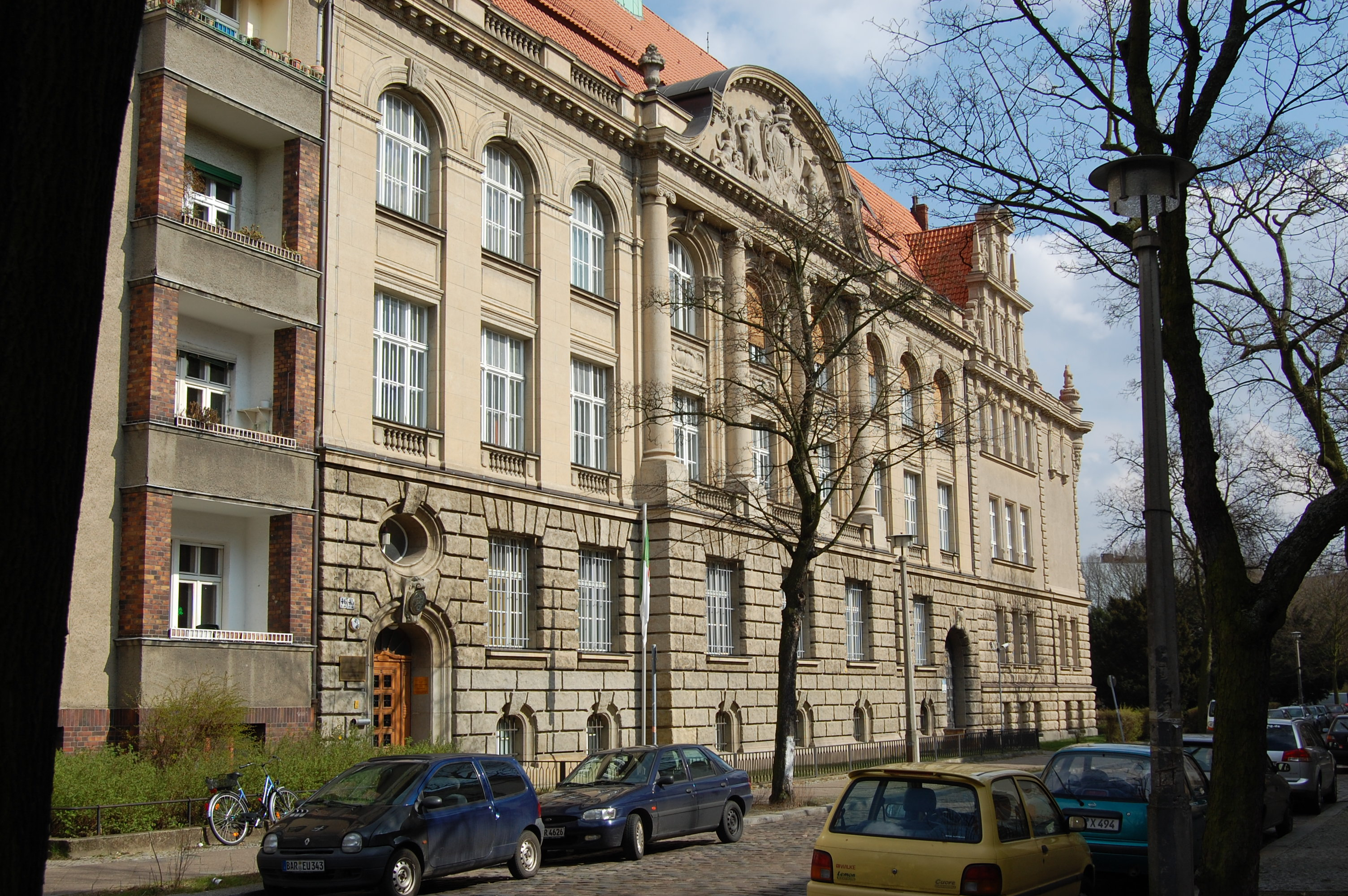
Algerian Embassy in Berlin

== See also ==
- Foreign relations of Algeria
- Foreign relations of Germany
