= Algeria–Israel relations =

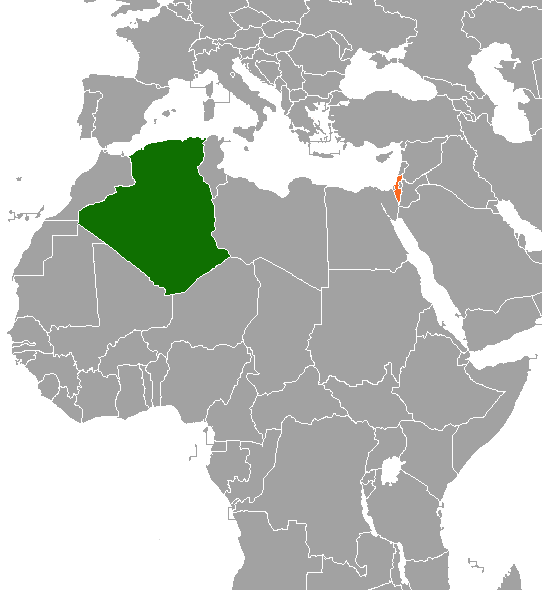
- Algeria: Israel

Algeria and Israel have no official diplomatic relations, with Algeria being part of the Arab League boycott of Israel, and officially does not recognize the State of Israel. Algeria refuses entry to any person holding an Israeli passport or any other passport with a visa from Israel.

== 20th century ==
=== 1950s ===
During the Algerian War, Israel offered diplomatic assistance and collaborated on intelligence matters with France, opposing Algerian independence. Israel closely cooperated with French intelligence services, providing valuable information about the National Liberation Front (FLN). Furthermore, Israeli agents frequently engaged in direct combat against Algerian nationalists, fighting alongside French forces. Israel voted consistently against Algeria's independence in the United Nations.

=== 1960s and 1970s ===
Shortly after Algeria gained its independence from France in 1962, Israel recognized the country's independence. In 1962, Algeria became one of the first countries to recognize the Palestine Liberation Organization (PLO) as the sole legitimate representative of the Palestinian people. Since then, Algeria has supported various Palestinian militant groups, including Hamas and the Popular Front for the Liberation of Palestine (PFLP).

During the Six-Day War in 1967, Algeria sent a battalion of infantry and a squadron of MiG-21s to Egypt, losing three Mig-21s to Israel. During the Yom Kippur War in 1973, Algeria sent an expeditionary force to fight Israel, including 59 aircraft (MiG-21, MiG-17, Su-7), an infantry platoon and an armored brigade (with an estimated 19 artillery weapons). Algeria also had a very important role in the Arab-Israeli war in 1973, by sending its 8th Infantry Mechanical Regiment to the Egyptian front to fight. There were almost 2,100 men, 815 non-commissioned officers, and 192 officers in total.

=== 1990s ===
In the mid-1990s, while Israel and other North African states slowly started diplomatic relations, Algeria remained one of the last countries to refrain from such a move. It was only when Prime Minister of Israel Ehud Barak met President of Algeria Abdelaziz Bouteflika at the funeral of the King of Morocco Hassan II on July 25, 1999, that alleged unofficial comments were made.

== 21st century ==
=== 2010s ===
In January 2012, both Algeria and Israel as part of the Mediterranean Dialogue attended the 166th Military Committee meetings with NATO members in Brussels.

In 2016, an Algerian high school geography textbook that contained a map that included Israel was withdrawn. In January 2017, an Algerian was arrested after an online video interview with an Israeli official.

=== 2020s ===
In 2020, Israeli Foreign Minister Gabi Ashkenazi said that he was interested in improving relations with Algeria and other Arab countries. Also in 2020, amidst Gulf states' call to normalize relations, and the Hirak political renewal impact on the country's internal affairs, some voices were calling on reviewing the country's bilateral relations in a way that benefits the country.

President Abdelmadjid Tebboune, during an interview with Algerian media on September 20, 2020, stated, "We have noticed a kind of scramble towards normalization. This is something we will never participate in, nor bless, the Palestinian issue is sacred for us and it is the mother of all issues and will not be resolved except by establishing a Palestinian state, with the 1967 borders, with Holy Jerusalem as its capital," The statement refers to the ceremony that took place at the White House in the United States on September 15 of the same year, during which the United Arab Emirates and Bahrain signed normalization agreements with Israel, mediated by U.S. President Donald Trump.

On February 3, 2025, Algerian President Abdelmadjid Tebboune, reaffirmed that Algeria will not normalize relations with Israel before the establishment of a Palestinian state. In an interview with the French newspaper Le Point, he stated, 'Of course, the day that happens,' when asked if Algeria would consider normalization after a Palestinian state is created. Tebboune emphasized that Algeria’s priority remains the establishment of a Palestinian state.

== See also ==
- History of the Jews in Algeria
