= Group of 24 =

International governmental financial organization

Intergovernmental Group of Twenty-Four

- Members of the Group of 24 as of 2019
- Abbreviation: G-24
- Named after: Number of founding Member States
- Formation: 1971; 55 years ago
- Founder: Group of 77
- Founded at: Lima, Peru
- Type: Intergovernmental trade bloc
- Purpose: To aid in the coordination of the positions of developing countries on monetary and development issues
- Headquarters: Washington, D.C., United States
- Methods: Collective bargaining, lobbying, reports and studies
- Fields: International trade
- Members: 29 Member States (2019)
- Chair of the G-24: Adama Coulibaly (Adama Coulibaly in French)
- Parent organization: Group of 77
- Affiliations: United Nations
- Website: www.g24.org

The Intergovernmental Group of Twenty-Four on International Monetary Affairs and Development, or The Group of 24 (G-24) was established in 1971 as a chapter of the Group of 77 in order to help coordinate the positions of developing countries on international monetary and development finance issues, as well as and to ensure that their interests are adequately represented in negotiations on international monetary matters. Though originally named after the number of founding Member States, it now has 28 Members (plus China, which acts as a Special Invitee). Although the G-24 officially has 28 member countries, any member of the G-77 can join discussions. By the 1st of November 2025, Nigeria, will assume the chairmanship of the Group.

Although the group is not an organ of the International Monetary Fund, the IMF provides secretariat services for the Group. It meets biannually, first prior to the International Monetary and Financial Committee, and secondly prior to the Joint Ministerial Committee of the Boards of Governors of the Bank and the Fund. These meetings allow developing country members to discuss agenda items prior to these important meetings of the IMF/World Bank.

== Member states ==
Following is the list of members of G-24:

Region I (Africa):

- Algeria
- DR Congo
- Egypt
- Ethiopia
- Gabon
- Ghana
- Ivory Coast
- Kenya
- Morocco
- Nigeria
- South Africa

Region II (Latin America and the Caribbean):

- Argentina
- Bahamas
- Brazil
- Colombia
- Ecuador
- Guatemala
- Haiti
- Mexico
- Peru
- Trinidad and Tobago
- Venezuela

Region III (Asia):

- China
- India
- Iran
- Lebanon
- Pakistan
- Philippines
- Sri Lanka
- Syria

=== Observers ===
The following act as observers states of the G-24:

- Angola
- Indonesia
- Saudi Arabia
- United Arab Emirates

The following act as institutional observers of the G-24:

- Arab Monetary Fund
- Economic Commission for Latin America and the Caribbean
- Group of 77
- International Labour Organization
- Islamic Development Bank
- OPEC Fund for International Development
- Organization of the Petroleum Exporting Countries
- South Centre
- United Nations Conference on Trade and Development
- United Nations Department of Economic and Social Affairs
- Central American Monetary Council

== Organization ==
The G-24 operates at two levels:

- The political level, consisting of Ministers, their Deputies, the Bureau, and other Washington-based representatives who participate in the Committee of the Whole and in any ad hoc meetings; and
- The operational level, which is run by the G-24 Liaison Office, and includes the G-24 Secretariat and the Research Coordinator.

The governing body of the G-24 meets twice a year, preceding the Spring and Fall meetings of the International Monetary and Financial Committee and the Joint Development Committee of the World Bank and the International Monetary Fund. The plenary G-24 meetings are addressed by the heads of the IMF and the World Bank Group as well as by senior officials of the UN system. Issues are first discussed by the Deputies and culminate at the Ministerial level by the approval of a document that sets out the consensus views of member countries. The Ministerial document is released as a public Communiqué at a press conference held at the end of the meetings. Decision-making within the G-24 is by consensus.

== Leadership ==
=== Political leadership ===
The following compose the political leadership of the Group:

- Chair: Adama Coulibaly, Minister of Finance, Côte d'Ivoire
- First Vice-Chair: Benjamin E. Diokno, Secretary of Finance, Philippines
- Second Vice-Chair: Sergio Massa, Minister of Treasury, Argentina

=== Secretariat ===
The G-24 Secretariat is a permanent body that serves as the administrative organ of the G-24. It is based in Washington D.C. in the IMF Headquarters. The functions and activities of the Secretariat include: ensuring effective liaison among G-24 members with a view of facilitating consensus on issues of common interest; overseeing and implementing the work program; building strategic partnerships and coalitions with other fora engaged in the same spheres of interest; and supporting the Chair and the Bureau by providing logistical and secretarial support for the various meetings of the G-24.

Until 1997, the Research Program of the Group was the operational organ for the coordination of members' policy positions. The program was headed by a Research Coordinator that directs the policy outputs of the organization. Past research coordinators include Sidney S. Dell (British), 1975-1990; Gary Helleiner (Canada), 1990-1997. With the formalization of the establishment of the Secretariat in 1997 and absorption of the Research program into the Secretariat function, subsequent research coordinators included the Turkish economist Dani Rodrik (2002) and Malaysian economist Jomo Sundaram (2006–2012).

The Secretariat is headed by a Director, who, since 1997, also manages the G-24’s Research Program.

Current and past Directors are:

Year	Name	Country
1997	Aziz Ali Mohammed	
2000–2002	William Larralde	Venezuela
2002–2007	Ariel Buira	Mexico
2007–2014	Amar Bhattacharya	
2014–2023	Marilou Uy	Philippines
2023–present	Iyabo Masha	Nigeria

=== Chair ===
The following is the list of former and current Chairs of the G-24:

Year	Chair
2005	Gabon
2006	Philippines
2007	Argentina
2008	Democratic Republic of Congo
2009	Syria
2010	Brazil
2011	South Africa
2012	India
2013	Mexico
2014	Egypt
2015	Lebanon
2016	Colombia
2017	Ethiopia
2018	Sri Lanka
2019	Peru
2020	Ghana
2021	Iran
2022	Guatemala
2023	Côte d’Ivoire

== Research and publications ==
The Group also maintains a research and work program that revolves around issues of importance to developing countries. In particular, the program focuses on three key areas: The global economy and growth agenda, international financial architecture, and financing for development. The global economy and growth agenda emphasizes structural transformation, trade and technology, and inequality. international financial architecture covers reform and governance of global financial institutions, the global financial safety net and managing capital flows, and financial regulation. financing for development includes taxation and international tax cooperation, infrastructure financing, debt management and sustainability, and financial inclusion. Much of the group's research, including books, policy briefs and working papers can be found on its website.
