= Foreign relations of Poland =

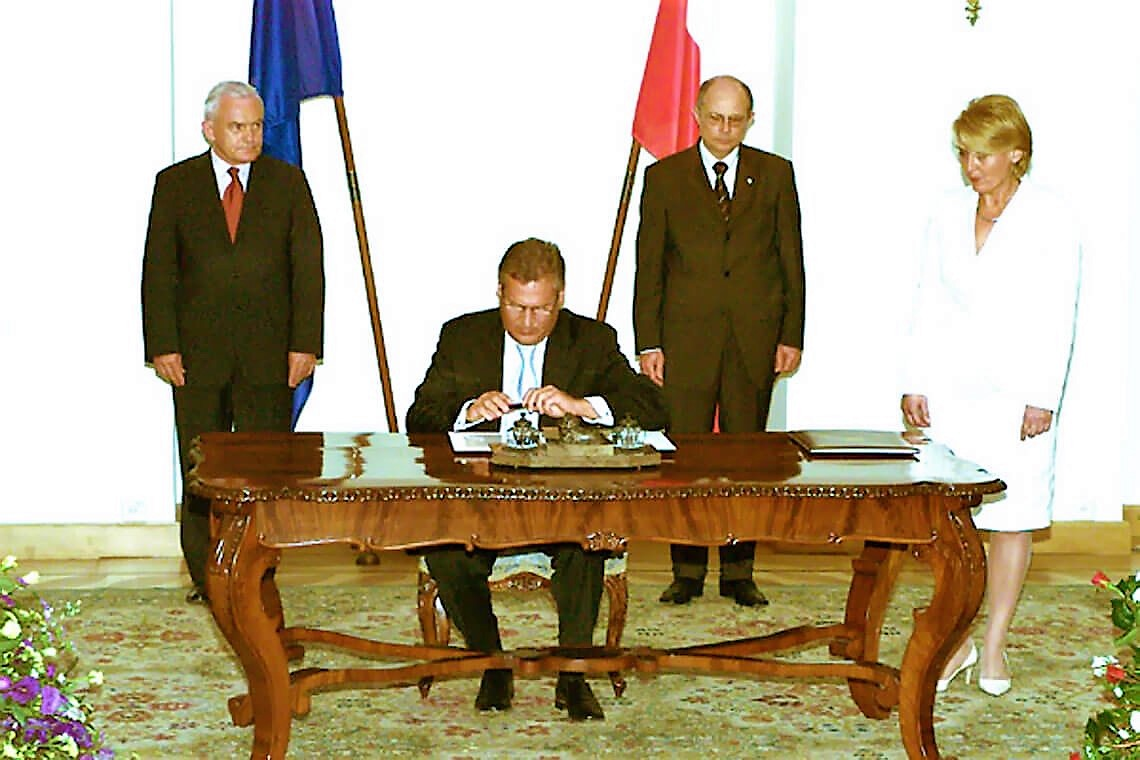
The signing by President Aleksander Kwaśniewski of the treaty on Poland's accession to the European Union.

The Republic of Poland is a Central European country and member of the European Union and NATO, among others. Poland wields considerable influence in Central and Eastern Europe and is a middle power in international affairs. The foreign policy of Poland is based on four basic commitments: to Atlantic co-operation, to European integration, to international development and to international law.

The Polish economy is fairly open and relies strongly on international trade. Since the collapse of communism and its re-establishment as a democratic nation, Poland has extended its responsibilities and position in European and Western affairs, supporting and establishing friendly foreign relations with both the West and with numerous European countries.

The Ministry of Foreign Affairs (Poland) looks after the foreign relations of Poland. As of May 2024 the ministry was held by Radosław Sikorski.

== History ==
Foreign policy topics are covered in the history articles:

- History of Poland
  - History of Poland in the Early Modern era (1569–1795)
  - History of Poland (1795–1918), when it was split three ways between Germany, Russia and Austria and had no foreign policy
    - Duchy of Warsaw (1807–1815) a semi-independent country
    - History of Poland during World War I
  - History of Poland (1918–1939)
  - History of Poland (1939–1945)
  - History of Poland (1945–1989)
  - History of Poland (1989–present)

== Integration with the West and Europe ==
After regaining independence in 1989, Poland has ahead on its economic reintegration with the Western world. Poland also has been an active nation in advocating European integration.

In 1994, Poland became an associate member of the European Union (EU) and its defensive arm, the Western European Union (WEU). In 1996, Poland achieved full OECD membership and submitted preliminary documentation for full EU membership.

Poland formally joined the European Union in May 2004, along with the other members of the Visegrád Group.

=== NATO membership ===
Włodzimierz Cimoszewicz told a 2014 audience at the Wilson Center that Poland sought to join NATO as early as 1992.

In 1997, Poland was invited in the first wave of NATO enlargement at the July 1997 NATO Madrid summit. In March 1999, Poland became a full member of NATO. Poland promoted its NATO candidacy through energetic participation in the Partnership for Peace (PfP) program and through intensified individual dialogue with NATO.

Poland was a part of the multinational force in Iraq.

== Diplomatic Relations ==
List of countries which Poland maintains diplomatic relations with:

#	Country	Date
1	Italy	27 February 1919
2	Belgium	6 March 1919
3	Switzerland	12 March 1919
4	Greece	13 March 1919
5	Japan	22 March 1919
6	France	2 April 1919
7	United States	2 May 1919
8	Spain	30 May 1919
—	Holy See	6 June 1919
9	Czech Republic	21 June 1919
10	Romania	22 June 1919
11	Netherlands	4 July 1919
12	United Kingdom	15 July 1919
13	Sweden	2 August 1919
14	Norway	25 August 1919
15	Denmark	8 September 1919
16	Serbia	19 September 1919
17	Finland	7 February 1920
18	Brazil	27 May 1920
19	Uruguay	22 July 1920
20	Paraguay	12 August 1920
21	Chile	7 December 1920
22	Luxembourg	18 April 1921
23	Russia	27 April 1921
24	Austria	6 September 1921
25	Bulgaria	6 September 1921
26	Hungary	17 November 1921
27	Portugal	13 May 1922
28	Argentina	19 July 1922
29	Turkey	23 July 1923
30	Peru	6 September 1923
31	Egypt	1927
32	Iran	19 March 1927
33	Afghanistan	3 November 1927
34	Mexico	26 February 1928
35	Iraq	22 December 1932
36	Cuba	1 January 1933
37	Colombia	18 November 1933
38	Costa Rica	18 November 1933
39	Dominican Republic	18 November 1933
40	Ecuador	18 November 1933
41	El Salvador	18 November 1933
42	Haiti	18 November 1933
43	Honduras	18 November 1933
44	Nicaragua	18 November 1933
45	Panama	18 November 1933
46	Venezuela	18 November 1933
47	Guatemala	20 January 1934
48	Bolivia	3 September 1935
49	Albania	7 April 1937
50	Canada	9 February 1942
51	Ethiopia	1 September 1943
52	Lebanon	1 August 1944
53	Syria	18 September 1945
54	Iceland	14 January 1946
55	Israel	19 May 1948
56	North Korea	16 October 1948
57	China	7 October 1949
58	Vietnam	4 February 1950
59	Mongolia	14 April 1950
60	India	30 March 1954
61	Indonesia	19 September 1955
62	Myanmar	9 November 1955
63	Sudan	4 April 1956
64	Cambodia	24 April 1956
65	Sri Lanka	18 April 1957
66	Yemen	21 December 1957
67	Guinea	29 June 1959
68	Morocco	7 July 1959
69	Tunisia	15 November 1959
70	Nepal	24 November 1959
71	Ghana	31 December 1959
72	Cyprus	15 January 1961
73	Democratic Republic of the Congo	12 February 1961
74	Mali	12 May 1961
75	Tanzania	14 January 1962
76	Algeria	2 May 1962
77	Nigeria	30 May 1962
78	Benin	14 June 1962
79	Senegal	18 June 1962
80	Somalia	10 July 1962
81	Burundi	8 August 1962
82	Laos	8 September 1962
83	Sierra Leone	9 November 1962
84	Pakistan	17 December 1962
85	Togo	26 December 1962
86	Uganda	8 April 1963
87	Kuwait	17 May 1963
88	Libya	2 December 1963
89	Kenya	13 December 1963
90	Jordan	20 February 1964
91	Rwanda	10 July 1965
92	Mauritania	3 December 1965
93	Zambia	30 June 1966
94	Burkina Faso	13 June 1968
95	Singapore	12 April 1969
96	Central African Republic	15 January 1970
97	Malaysia	21 June 1971
98	Niger	30 June 1971
99	Malta	23 October 1971
100	Bangladesh	12 January 1972
101	Australia	20 February 1972
102	Cameroon	14 March 1972
103	Guyana	10 July 1972
104	Germany	14 September 1972
105	Thailand	14 November 1972
106	Republic of the Congo	19 December 1972
107	New Zealand	28 February 1973
108	Liberia	30 May 1973
109	Philippines	22 September 1973
110	Guinea-Bissau	3 October 1973
111	Madagascar	28 November 1973
112	Ivory Coast	9 June 1974
113	Jamaica	4 November 1974
114	Gambia	21 January 1975
115	Mozambique	25 June 1975
116	Angola	25 November 1975
117	Cape Verde	12 February 1976
118	Ireland	30 September 1976
119	Gabon	16 October 1976
120	Comoros	6 June 1977
121	Papua New Guinea	10 February 1978
122	São Tomé and Príncipe	20 November 1978
123	Botswana	22 November 1978
124	Lesotho	20 December 1978
125	Chad	5 January 1979
126	Seychelles	14 February 1979
127	Mauritius	30 April 1979
128	Equatorial Guinea	29 May 1979
129	Djibouti	24 February 1980
130	Grenada	2 June 1980
131	Zimbabwe	18 February 1981
132	Maldives	1 October 1984
133	Vanuatu	15 November 1986
—	State of Palestine	11 April 1989
134	United Arab Emirates	4 September 1989
135	Qatar	16 October 1989
136	South Korea	1 November 1989
137	Oman	24 January 1990
138	Namibia	21 March 1990
139	Eswatini	10 May 1990
—	Sovereign Military Order of Malta	9 July 1990
140	Bahrain	22 April 1991
141	Latvia	30 August 1991
142	Estonia	2 September 1991
143	Lithuania	5 September 1991
144	Marshall Islands	17 December 1991
145	South Africa	18 December 1991
146	Ukraine	4 January 1992
147	Kyrgyzstan	10 February 1992
148	Tajikistan	11 February 1992
149	Azerbaijan	21 February 1992
150	Armenia	26 February 1992
151	Belarus	2 March 1992
152	Uzbekistan	19 March 1992
153	Kazakhstan	6 April 1992
154	Slovenia	10 April 1992
155	Croatia	11 April 1992
156	Georgia	28 April 1992
157	Malawi	10 July 1992
158	Moldova	14 July 1992
159	Liechtenstein	5 September 1992
160	Turkmenistan	29 September 1992
161	Slovakia	1 January 1993
162	Suriname	24 May 1993
163	Eritrea	15 July 1993
164	North Macedonia	30 December 1993
165	San Marino	14 November 1994
166	Belize	2 May 1995
167	Saudi Arabia	3 May 1995
168	Bosnia and Herzegovina	22 December 1995
169	Brunei	20 March 1996
170	Andorra	15 May 1996
171	Saint Vincent and the Grenadines	16 May 1996
172	Barbados	13 September 1996
173	Trinidad and Tobago	13 August 1998
174	Saint Lucia	24 May 2000
175	Timor-Leste	18 November 2002
176	Bahamas	19 November 2003
177	Antigua and Barbuda	13 September 2005
178	Montenegro	14 August 2006
179	Monaco	27 September 2007
180	Dominica	4 June 2009
181	Saint Kitts and Nevis	23 June 2009
182	Palau	27 January 2012
183	Solomon Islands	6 March 2012
184	Samoa	8 March 2012
185	Bhutan	29 November 2012
186	South Sudan	31 January 2013
187	Fiji	11 July 2014
188	Nauru	24 November 2014
189	Kiribati	2 March 2015
190	Federated States of Micronesia	6 March 2015
191	Tuvalu	4 May 2015
192	Tonga	29 August 2016
—	Cook Islands	20 March 2025

== Bilateral relations ==
=== Multilateral ===
Organization	Formal Relations Began	Notes
European Union		See Poland in the European Union Poland joined the European Union as a full member on 1 May 2004.
NATO		Poland joined NATO as a full member on 12 March 1999.

=== Africa ===
Country	Formal Relations Began	Notes
Algeria		See Algeria–Poland relations: Algeria has an embassy in Warsaw.; Poland has an embassy in Algiers.
Angola		Angola has an embassy in Warsaw.; Poland has an embassy in Luanda.
Chad		Chad is accredited to Poland from its embassy in Moscow, Russia.; Poland is accredited to Chad from its embassy in Tunis, Tunisia.
Egypt		See Egypt–Poland relations: Egypt has an embassy in Warsaw.; Poland has an embassy in Cairo.
Ethiopia		See Ethiopia–Poland relations: Ethiopia is accredited to Poland from its embassy in Berlin, Germany.; Poland has an embassy in Addis Ababa.
Kenya	13 December 1963	See Kenya–Poland relations: Kenya is accredited to Poland from its embassy in Rome, Italy.; Poland has an embassy in Nairobi.
Libya		See Libya–Poland relations: Libya has an embassy in Warsaw.; Poland is accredited to Libya from its embassy in Cairo, Egypt.
Madagascar		Madagascar is accredited to Poland from its embassy in Moscow, Russia.; Poland is accredited to Madagascar from its embassy in Nairobi, Kenya.
Mali		See Mali–Poland relations
Morocco		See Morocco–Poland relations: Morocco has an embassy in Warsaw.; Poland has an embassy in Rabat.
Mozambique	25 June 1975	Mozambique is accredited to Poland from its embassy in Berlin, Germany.; Poland is accredited to Mozambique from its embassy in Pretoria, South Africa and maintains an honorary consulate in Maputo.
Namibia	21 March 1990	Namibia is accredited to Poland from its embassy in Berlin, Germany.; Poland is accredited to Namibia from its embassy in Pretoria, South Africa.
Nigeria		See Nigeria–Poland relations: Nigeria has an embassy in Warsaw.; Poland has an embassy in Abuja.
Senegal		See Poland–Senegal relations: Poland has an embassy in Dakar.; Senegal has an embassy in Warsaw.
South Africa	1988	See Poland–South Africa relations: Poland has an embassy in Pretoria.; South Africa has an embassy in Warsaw.
South Sudan	31 January 2013	See Poland–South Sudan relations
Tanzania	1961	See Poland–Tanzania relations: Poland has an embassy in Dar es Salaam.; Tanzania is accredited to Poland from its embassy in Berlin, Germany.
Tunisia		See Poland–Tunisia relations: Poland has an embassy in Tunis.; Tunisia has an embassy in Warsaw.
Uganda	1963	See Poland–Uganda relations: Poland is accredited to Uganda from its embassy in Nairobi, Kenya and maintains an honorary consulate in Kampala.; Uganda is accredited to Poland from its embassy in Berlin, Germany.
Zambia		See Poland–Zambia relations

=== Americas ===
Country	Formal Relations Began	Notes
Argentina	1920	See Argentina–Poland relations: Argentina has an embassy in Warsaw.; Poland has an embassy in Buenos Aires.; List of Treaties ruling the relations Argentina and Poland (Argentine Foreign Ministry, in Spanish)
Belize	2 May 1995	Both countries established diplomatic relations on May 2, 1995.
Bolivia		Bolivia is accredited to Poland from its embassy in Berlin, Germany.; Poland is accredited to Bolivia from its embassy in Lima, Peru.
Brazil	27 May 1920	See Brazil–Poland relations: Brazil has an embassy in Warsaw.; Poland has an embassy in Brasília and a consulate-general in Curitiba.
Canada	1935	See Canada–Poland relations: The Canada-Poland diplomatic relationship goes back from the first bilateral agreement, a Convention on Merchant Shipping, which was signed in 1935.; Canada has an embassy in Warsaw.; Poland has an embassy in Ottawa and 3 Consulates-General (in Montreal, Toronto and Vancouver).; Both countries are full members of NATO and OECD.; Canadian Ministry of Foreign Affairs and International Trade about relations with Poland
Chile	1920	See Chile–Poland relations: Chile has an embassy in Warsaw.; Poland has an embassy in Santiago.; Both countries are full members of the OECD.
Colombia	1931	See Colombia–Poland relations: Colombia has an embassy in Warsaw.; Poland has an embassy in Bogotá.; Both countries are full members of the OECD.
Cuba	1933	See Cuba–Poland relations: Cuba has an embassy in Warsaw.; Poland has an embassy in Havana.
Ecuador		Ecuador is accredited to Poland from its embassy in Berlin, Germany.; Poland is accredited to Ecuador from its embassy in Lima, Peru.
El Salvador		El Salvador is accredited to Poland from its embassy in Berlin, Germany.; Poland is accredited to El Salvador from its embassy in Panama City, Panama.
Guyana	1972	Both countries established diplomatic relations on 10 June 1972.: Guyana is accredited to Poland from its high commission in London, United Kingdom.; Poland is accredited to Guyana from its embassy in Caracas, Venezuela.
Haiti		See Haiti–Poland relations: Haiti is accredited to Poland from its embassy in Berlin, Germany.; Poland is accredited to Haiti from its embassy in Panama City, Panama, and there is an honorary consulate of Poland in Port-au-Prince.
Honduras		Honduras is accredited to Poland from its embassy in Berlin, Germany.; Poland is accredited to Honduras from its embassy in Panama City, Panama.
Mexico	26 February 1928	See Mexico–Poland relations: Mexico has an embassy in Warsaw.; Poland has an embassy in Mexico City.; History of diplomatic relations between Mexico and Poland (Spanish); Both nations are members of the OECD.
Panama		Panama has an embassy in Warsaw.; Poland has an embassy in Panama City.
Paraguay		Paraguay is accredited to Poland from its embassy in Berlin, Germany.; Poland is accredited to Paraguay from its embassy in Buenos Aires, Argentina.
Peru	1923	See Peru–Poland relations: Peru has an embassy in Warsaw.; Poland has an embassy in Lima.
United States		See Poland–United States relations A tighter security alliance with the United States was announced in the middle of the Georgian crisis as an agreement between the two countries was reached to allow the US to install and operate an interceptor missile defense shield, a move which Russia sees explicitly targeting it and which it stated made Poland "a legit military target". A high-ranking Russian military official said: "Poland in deploying [the US system] opens itself to a nuclear strike".: Poland has an embassy in Washington, D.C., and consulates-general in Chicago, Houston, Los Angeles, and New York.; United States has an embassy in Warsaw, a consulate-general in Kraków, and a consular agency in Poznań.; Both countries are full members of NATO and the OECD.
Uruguay	22 July 1920	See Poland–Uruguay relations: Poland is accredited to Uruguay from its embassy in Buenos Aires, Argentina.; Uruguay is accredited to Poland from its embassy in Berlin, Germany.
Venezuela	1933	See Poland–Venezuela relations: Poland has an embassy in Caracas.; Venezuela has an embassy in Warsaw.

=== Asia ===
Country	Formal Relations Began	Notes
Afghanistan		See Afghanistan–Poland relations: Afghanistan has an embassy in Warsaw.; Poland is accredited to Afghanistan from its embassy in New Delhi, India.
Armenia	1992-2-26	See Armenia–Poland relations: Armenia has an embassy in Warsaw, and honorary consulates in Łódź, Poznań and Zabrze.; Poland has an embassy in Yerevan.; Poland has recognized the Armenian genocide in 2005.; Both countries are full members of the Council of Europe.; See also Armenians in Poland and Poles in Armenia
Azerbaijan	1992-02-21	See Azerbaijan–Poland relations: Azerbaijan has an embassy in Warsaw.; Poland has an embassy in Baku.; Both countries are full members of the Council of Europe.; See also Poles in Azerbaijan
Bangladesh		See Bangladesh–Poland relations: Bangladesh has an embassy in Warsaw.; Poland is accredited to Bangladesh from its embassy in New Delhi, India.
China	1919	See China–Poland relations: Relations between Poland and the People's Republic of China began on 5 October 1949.; China has an embassy in Warsaw.; Poland has an embassy in Beijing and consulates-general in Chengdu, Guangzhou, Hong Kong and Shanghai.
Georgia	1992-04-28	See Georgia–Poland relations: Georgia has an embassy in Warsaw.; Poland has an embassy in Tbilisi.; Both countries are full members of the Council of Europe.; Georgia is an EU candidate and Poland is an EU member.; See also Georgians in Poland and Poles in Georgia
India		See India–Poland relations Historically, relations have generally been close and friendly, characterized by understanding and cooperation on international front.: India has an embassy in Warsaw.; Poland has an embassy in New Delhi.
Indonesia		See Indonesia–Poland relations: Indonesia has an embassy in Warsaw.; Poland has an embassy in Jakarta.
Iran		See Iran–Poland relations: Iran has an embassy in Warsaw.; Poland has an embassy in Tehran.
Iraq		See Iraq–Poland relations: Iraq has an embassy in Warsaw.; Poland has an embassy in Baghdad.
Israel	27 February 1990	See Israel–Poland relations Poland broke off relations with Israel after the Six-Day War of 1967, following most other countries of the Soviet Union controlled Eastern Bloc. Poland was the first Eastern bloc country to recognize Israel again in 1986. Full diplomatic relations have been reestablished in 1990, after the communist People's Republic of Poland was transformed into modern, democratic Poland. Government relations between Poland and Israel are steadily improving, resulting in the mutual visits of presidents and the ministers of foreign affairs.: Israel has an embassy in Warsaw.; Poland has an embassy in Tel Aviv.; Both countries are full members of the OECD.; See also History of the Jews in Poland
Japan		See Japan–Poland relations: Japan has an embassy in Warsaw, and an honorary consulate in Kraków.; Poland has an embassy in Tokyo, and 2 honorary consulates (in Kobe and Hiroshima).; Both countries are full members of the OECD.; See also Poles in Japan
Kazakhstan	6 April 1992	See Kazakhstan–Poland relations Poland opened its embassy in Nur-Sultan in March 1994. Kazakhstan's embassy to Poland was opened in October 2000.: Kazakhstan has an embassy in Warsaw.; Poland has an embassy in Astana.; See also Poles in Kazakhstan
Kuwait		Kuwait has an embassy in Warsaw.; Poland has an embassy in Kuwait City.
Kyrgyzstan		Kyrgyzstan is accredited to Poland from its embassy in Berlin, Germany.; Poland is accredited to Kyrgyzstan from its embassy in Astana, Kazakhstan.; See also Poles in Kyrgyzstan
Lebanon		Lebanon has an embassy in Warsaw.; Poland has an embassy in Beirut.
Malaysia		See Malaysia–Poland relations Malaysia has an embassy in Warsaw, and Poland has an embassy in Kuala Lumpur and a consulate in Kuching.
Mongolia		See Mongolia–Poland relations: Mongolia has an embassy in Warsaw.; Poland has an embassy in Ulaanbaatar.
North Korea	1948 October	See Poland–North Korea relations: North Korea has an embassy in Warsaw.; Poland has an embassy in Pyongyang.
Pakistan	17 December 1962	See Pakistan–Poland relations: Pakistan has an embassy in Warsaw.; Poland has an embassy in Islamabad.
Palestine	9 July 1982 (PLO), 11 April 1989 (formalized)	See Palestine–Poland relations: Palestine has an embassy in Warsaw.; Poland has a representative office in Ramallah.
Philippines		See Philippines–Poland relations: Philippines has an embassy in Warsaw and 2 honorary consulates (in Poznań and Wrocław).; Poland has an embassy in Manila and 3 honorary consulates (in Cebu City, Davao City and San Fernando).
Qatar		Poland has an embassy in Doha.; Qatar has an embassy in Warsaw.
Saudi Arabia		See Poland–Saudi Arabia relations: Poland has an embassy in Riyadh.; Saudi Arabia has an embassy in Warsaw.
Singapore	1969	See Poland–Singapore relations: Poland has an embassy in Singapore.; Singapore has a non-resident ambassador based in Singapore accredited to Poland and has an honorary consulate-general in Warsaw.
South Korea	1 November 1989	See Poland–South Korea relations: Both countries are full members of the OECD.; Poland and South Korea have a good relations.; Polish embassy in Seoul.; South Korean embassy in Warsaw.; Poland and South Korea have made an agreement of the Working Holiday Program.; See also: Poland–South Korea relations
Taiwan		See Poland–Taiwan relations: Poland maintains a Representative Office in Taipei.; Taiwan maintains a Taipei Economic and Cultural Representative Office in Warsaw.
Tajikistan		See Poland–Tajikistan relations: Poland is accredited to Tajikistan from its embassy in Tashkent, Uzbekistan.; Tajikistan is accredited to Poland from its embassy in Berlin, Germany.
Thailand		Poland has an embassy in Bangkok.; Thailand has an embassy in Warsaw.
Turkey		See Poland–Turkey relations: Poland has an embassy in Ankara and a consulate-general in Istanbul.; Turkey has an embassy in Warsaw.; Both countries are full members of NATO, OECD and the Council of Europe.; Poland is an EU member and Turkey is an EU candidate. Poland supports Turkey's accession negotiations to the EU, although negotiations have now been suspended.
Turkmenistan		See Poland–Turkmenistan relations: Poland is accredited to Turkmenistan from its embassy in Baku, Azerbaijan.; Turkmenistan is accredited to Poland from its embassy in Berlin, Germany.
United Arab Emirates		See Poland–United Arab Emirates relations: Poland has an embassy in Abu Dhabi.; United Arab Emirates has an embassy in Warsaw.
Uzbekistan		See Poland–Uzbekistan relations: Poland has an embassy in Tashkent.; Uzbekistan has an embassy in Warsaw.; See also Poles in Uzbekistan
Vietnam		See Poland–Vietnam relations: Poland has an embassy in Hanoi.; Vietnam has an embassy in Warsaw.

=== Europe ===
Country	Formal Relations Began	Notes
Albania		See Albania–Poland relations: Albania has an embassy in Warsaw.; Poland has an embassy in Tirana.; Both countries are full members of NATO.; Albania is an EU candidate and Poland is an EU member.
Andorra	1996-5-15	Andorra is accredited to Poland from its Ministry of Foreign Affairs in Andorra la Vella, Andorra.; Poland is accredited to Andorra from its embassy in Madrid, Spain.
Austria	1921	See Austria–Poland relations Austria was one of the three partitioners of Poland, along with Prussia/Germany and Russia.: Austria has an embassy in Warsaw and a consulate-general in Kraków and 3 honorary consulates (in Wrocław, Gdańsk, and Łódź).; Poland has an embassy in Vienna and 4 honorary consulates (in Graz, Innsbruck, Klagenfurt and Salzburg).; Austrian Foreign Ministry: list of bilateral treaties with Poland (in German only); Both countries are full members of the European Union and of the Council of Europe.
Belarus	1992-03-02	See Belarus–Poland relations: Both countries share a common border of 416 kilometres (258 miles).; Poland was one of the first countries to recognise Belarusian independence.; Belarus has an embassy in Warsaw and a consulate-general in Gdańsk and Białystok, and a consulate in Biała Podlaska.; Poland has an embassy in Minsk and consulates-general in Brest and Hrodna.
Belgium	1919-3	See Belgium–Poland relations: Belgium has an embassy in Warsaw.; Poland has an embassy in Brussels.; Both nations are members of the European Union, NATO and of the Council of Europe.
Bosnia and Herzegovina		Bosnia and Herzegovina has an embassy in Warsaw.; Poland has an embassy in Sarajevo.; Bosnia and Herzegovina is an EU candidate and Poland is an EU member.
Bulgaria	1920s	See Bulgaria–Poland relations: Bulgaria has an embassy in Warsaw and 5 honorary consulates (in Białystok, Częstochowa, Gdańsk, Kraków and Wrocław).; Poland has an embassy in Sofia, and an honorary consulate in Nesebar.; Both nations are members of the European Union, NATO and of the Council of Europe.
Croatia	1992-04-11	See Croatia–Poland relations: Croatia has an embassy in Warsaw.; Poland has an embassy in Zagreb.; Both countries are full members of the European Union and NATO.; Croatian Ministry of Foreign Affairs and European Integration: list of bilateral treaties with Poland
Cyprus	1960s	See Cyprus–Poland relations: Cyprus has an embassy in Warsaw and 2 honorary consulates (in Gdynia and Szczecin).; Poland has an embassy in Nicosia and an honorary consulate general in Limassol.; Both countries are full members of the European Union and of the Council of Europe.
Czech Republic	1991-10-6	See Czech Republic–Poland relations: Both countries share a common border of 790 kilometres (490 miles).; Czech Republic has an embassy in Warsaw and a consulate-general in Katowice.; Poland has an embassy in Prague and a consulate-general in Ostrava.; Both countries are full members of the European Union, NATO and the Visegrád Group.
Denmark		See Denmark–Poland relations: Denmark and Poland share a maritime border in the Baltic Sea.; Denmark has an embassy in Warsaw.; Poland has an embassy in Copenhagen.; Both countries are full members of the European Union, NATO and the Council of the Baltic Sea States.
Estonia	1991-09	See Estonia–Poland relations: Poland recognised Estonia's independence on December 31, 1920 and re-recognised it on August 26, 1991.; Estonia has an embassy in Warsaw and 3 honorary consulates (in Szczecin, Poznań and Kraków).; Poland has an embassy in Tallinn.; Both countries are full members of the Council of the Baltic Sea States, of NATO and of the European Union.; Estonia Ministry of Foreign affairs about relations with Poland
Finland	1919-03-08	See Finland–Poland relations: Finland has an embassy in Warsaw and an honorary consulate in Gdynia.; Poland has an embassy in Helsinki.; Both countries are full members of the Council of the Baltic Sea States and of the European Union and of NATO.; Poland fully supported Finland's application to join NATO, which resulted in membership on 4 April 2023.; Finnish Ministry of Foreign Affairs about relations with Poland
France	1919-2-24	See France–Poland relations Polish-French relations date several centuries, although they became really relevant only with times of French Revolution and reign of Napoleon I. Poles have been allies of Napoleon; large Polish community settled in France in the 19th century, and Poles and French were also allies during the interwar period. The official relations, having cooled down during the Cold War, have improved since the fall of communism. Currently both countries are part of the European Union and NATO.: France has an embassy in Warsaw and a Consulate general in Kraków; Poland has an embassy in Paris and a consulate-general in Lyon.; Both nations are members of the European Union, NATO and of the Council of Europe.
Germany		See Germany–Poland relations Before the creation of modern Germany in 1871, Germany was one of the three partitioners of Poland, along with Austria and Russia. The joint Nazi-Soviet invasion of Poland of 1939 started World War II, and then until 1945, Poland was occupied by Germany and subjected to crimes against its population. During the Cold War, communist Poland had good relations with East Germany, but had strained relations with West Germany. After the fall of communism, Poland and the reunited Germany have had a mostly positive but occasionally strained relationship due to some political issues. After the collapse of the Soviet Union, Germany has been a proponent of Poland's participation in NATO and the European Union.: Both countries share a common border of 467 kilometres (290 miles).; Germany has an embassy in Warsaw and consulates-general in Gdańsk, Kraków, Opole and Wrocław.; Poland has an embassy in Berlin and consulates-general in Cologne, Hamburg and Munich.; Both nations are members of the European Union, NATO and of the Council of Europe.
Greece		See Greece–Poland relations: Greece has an embassy in Warsaw.; Poland has an embassy in Athens.; Both nations are members of the European Union, NATO and of the Council of Europe.
Holy See	1919	See Holy See–Poland relations: Holy see has an apostolic nunciature in Warsaw.; Poland has an embassy to the Holy See based in Rome.
Hungary		See Hungary–Poland relations Relations between the two states date back from the Middle Ages. For a long time, they enjoy traditional close friendship.: Hungary has an embassy in Warsaw, a consulate-general in Kraków, a vice-consulate in Wrocław, and 4 honorary consulates (in Łódź, Poznań, Bydgoszcz and Szczecin).; Poland has an embassy in Budapest, and 3 honorary consulates (in Keszthely, Szeged and Szentendre).; Both countries are full members of the European Union, NATO and the Visegrád Group.
Iceland	January 1946	See Iceland–Poland relations: Iceland has an embassy in Warsaw.; Poland has an embassy in Reykjavík.; Both countries are full members of NATO.
Ireland	1976-9-30	See Ireland–Poland relations: Ireland has an embassy in Warsaw, and an honorary consulate in Poznań.; Poland has an embassy in Dublin, and 2 honorary consulates (in Limerick and Kilkenny).; Both countries are full members of the European Union and of the Council of Europe.
Italy	1919-2-27	See Italy–Poland relations: Northern Italy and parts of Poland were part of the Holy Roman Empire and the Austrian Empire.; Italy has an embassy in Warsaw, and 5 honorary consulates (in Gdynia, Kraków, Poznań, Szczecin and Wrocław).; Poland has an embassy in Rome, a consulate general in Milan, and 8 honorary consulates (in Ancona, Bologna, Genoa, Naples, Palermo, Trento, Turin, Venice).; Both nations are members of the European Union, NATO and of the Council of Europe.
Kosovo		See Kosovo–Poland relations: Poland recognised Kosovo's independence on February 26, 2008.; Poland has not established an embassy in Pristina, diplomatic relations are maintained through its embassy in Belgrade, Serbia; Kosovo maintains its diplomatic presence in Poland through its embassy in Warsaw
Latvia	1991-08-30	See Latvia–Poland relations: Poland recognised Latvia's independence on January 27, 1921.; Latvia has an embassy in Warsaw and 3 honorary consulates (in Katowice, Gdańsk and Łódź).; Poland has an embassy in Riga.; Both countries are full members of NATO, the European Union and the Council of the Baltic Sea States.; There are around 57,000 Poles living in Latvia (See Poles in Latvia).; Latvian Ministry of Foreign Affairs about relations with Poland
Lithuania	1991-9-5	See Lithuania–Poland relations Poland and Lithuania formed a close alliance and political union since 1385, which was eventually transformed into the Polish–Lithuanian Commonwealth, one of the greatest historic powers of Central and Eastern Europe. The fall of communism in the years of 1989-1991 led to a formal reestablishment of relations by the Polish and Lithuanian states. Poland was highly supportive of the Lithuanian independence, and became one of the first countries to recognize independent Lithuania. Despite that, there was a relative crisis in the early 1990s, due to Lithuanian mistreatment of Polish minority, and Lithuanian suspicious that Poland would want to put Lithuania under its sphere of influence. After a few years, as the situation normalized, Polish-Lithuanian relations have been steadily improving over the past two decades, with both countries joining the NATO and European Union.: Lithuania has an embassy in Warsaw and consulate general in Sejny.; Poland has an embassy in Vilnius and an honorary consulate in Klaipėda.; There are around 250,000 Poles living in Lithuania and around 25,000 ethnic Lithuanians living in Poland. Both countries are full members of the Council of the Baltic Sea States. Both countries share a common border of 103 kilometres (64 miles).
Luxembourg	1921-4-18	See Luxembourg–Poland relations: Luxembourg has an embassy in Warsaw.; Poland has an embassy in Luxembourg City.; Both countries are full members of the European Union and NATO.
Malta		Malta has an embassy in Warsaw.; Poland has an embassy in Valletta.; Both countries are full members of the European Union and of the Council of Europe.
Moldova	1991-8-27	See Moldova–Poland relations: Moldova has an embassy in Warsaw.; Poland has an embassy in Chișinău.; Both countries are full members of the Council of Europe.; Moldova is an EU candidate and Poland is an EU member.
Monaco	1990	Monaco is accredited to Poland from its embassy in Berlin, Germany and maintains an honorary consulate in Warsaw.; Poland is accredited to Monaco from its embassy in Paris, France.
Montenegro		Montenegro has an embassy in Warsaw.; Poland has an embassy in Podgorica.; Both countries are full members of NATO.; Montenegro is an EU candidate and Poland is an EU member.
Netherlands		See Netherlands–Poland relations: Netherlands has an embassy in Warsaw.; Poland has an embassy in The Hague.; Both nations are members of the European Union, NATO and of the Council of Europe.
North Macedonia		North Macedonia has an embassy in Warsaw.; Poland has an embassy in Skopje.; Both countries are full members of NATO.; North Macedonia is an EU candidate and Poland is an EU member.
Norway		See Norway–Poland relations: Norway has an embassy in Warsaw.; Poland has an embassy in Oslo.; Both countries are full members of NATO and the Council of the Baltic Sea States.; There are over 100,000 Poles in Norway, forming the largest minority group of the country (as of 2019).
Portugal	11 July 1974	See Poland–Portugal relations: Poland has an embassy in Lisbon.; Portugal has an embassy in Warsaw.; Both nations are members of the European Union, NATO and of the Council of Europe.
Romania	1919-02-09	See Poland–Romania relations: Poland has an embassy in Bucharest.; Romania has an embassy in Warsaw and 3 honorary consulates (in Gdynia, Katowice and Poznań).; Both nations are members of the European Union, NATO and of the Council of Europe.; See also Polish–Romanian alliance
Russia		See Poland–Russia relations Russia was one of the three partitioners of Poland, along with Austria and Prussia/Germany. The joint German-Soviet invasion of Poland of 1939 started World War II. In recent years, relations with Russia have worsened considerably. During the Russo-Georgian War Poland stated its support for Georgia and condemned Russia's actions. The Polish believed the war was carried out by the Russians in an attempt to reestablish and reassert its dominance over its former republics. Since 2009, however, relations with Russia somewhat improved, despite the Smolensk air disaster where the former Polish president died on what is still considered a controversial event. After the annexation of Crimea by Russia the relations deteriorated again, as Poland strongly condemned Russian actions against Ukraine.: Poland has an embassy in Moscow and consulates-general in Irkutsk, Kaliningrad and Saint Petersburg.; Russia has an embassy in Warsaw and consulates-general in Gdańsk, Kraków and Poznań.; Both countries are full members of the Council of the Baltic Sea States.
Serbia	1919	See Poland–Serbia relations: Poland has an embassy in Belgrade.; Serbia has an embassy in Warsaw.; Poland is an EU member and Serbia is an EU candidate.; Serbian Ministry of Foreign Affairs about relations with Poland
Slovakia	1993	See Poland–Slovakia relations: Poland has an embassy in Bratislava.; Slovakia has an embassy in Warsaw and a consulate-general in Kraków.; Both countries are full members of NATO, the European Union and the Visegrád Group.; Both countries share 539 kilometres (335 miles) of common borders.
Slovenia	1992-4-10	Slovenia has an embassy in Warsaw.; Poland has an embassy in Ljubljana.; Both countries are full members of the European Union and NATO.
Spain	1919-5-19	See Poland–Spain relations: Poland has an embassy in Madrid and a consulate-general in Barcelona.; Spain has an embassy in Warsaw.; Both countries are full members of the European Union and NATO.
Sweden	1919-6-3	See Poland–Sweden relations Poland and Sweden formed the Polish–Swedish union in the late 16th century.: Poland and Sweden share a maritime border in the Baltic Sea.; Poland has an embassy in Stockholm.; Sweden has an embassy in Warsaw.; Both countries are full members of the European Union, NATO, the Council of Europe and the Council of the Baltic Sea States.; There are over 90,000 Poles in Sweden, forming one of the largest minority groups of the country (as of 2019).; Poland fully supported Sweden's application to join NATO, which resulted in membership on 7 March 2024.
Switzerland		Poland has an embassy in Bern.; Switzerland has an embassy in Warsaw.; Both countries are full members of the Council of Europe.; Swiss Federal Department of Foreign Affairs about relations with Poland
Ukraine	1992-1-4	See Poland–Ukraine relations Both countries share a border of about 529 kilometres (329 miles). Poland's acceptance of the Schengen Agreement created problems with the Ukrainian border traffic. On July 1, 2009 an agreement on local border traffic between the two country's came into effect. This agreement enables Ukrainian citizens living in border regions to cross the Polish frontier according to a liberalized procedure.: Poland has an embassy in Kyiv and consulates-general in Kharkiv, Lviv, Lutsk, Odesa and Vinnytsia; Ukraine has an embassy in Warsaw and consulates-general in Gdańsk, Kraków, Lublin and Opole.; Both countries are full members of the Council of Europe.; Poland is an EU member and Ukraine is an EU candidate.
United Kingdom	1919-7-5	See Poland–United Kingdom relations British Prime Minister Keir Starmer with Polish Prime Minister Donald Tusk in Warsaw, January 2025. Poland established diplomatic relations with the United Kingdom on 15 July 1919.: Poland maintains an embassy in London.; The United Kingdom is accredited to Poland through its embassy in Warsaw.; Both countries share common membership of the Council of Europe, European Court of Human Rights, the International Criminal Court, NATO, OECD, OSCE, Trilateral Security Pact, and the World Trade Organization. Bilaterally the two countries have a Defence and Security Agreement, a Double Tax Convention, and a Strategic Partnership. During the Cold War Poland retained a largely negative view of Britain as a sluggish ally of Poland during World War II, later acceptance of neglecting Poland in the international arena and placing it in communist influences. In communist times the UK was a part of the NATO block, so consequently it was considered by the communists as natural enemy of the communist bloc. British efforts meanwhile were focussed at trying to break Poland off from the Warsaw Pact and encouraging reforms in the country. In the 1990s and 2000s democratic Poland has maintained close relations with Britain; both in defence matters and within the EU; Britain being one of only a few countries allowing equal rights to Polish workers upon their accession in 2004.: Poland has an embassy in London and consulates-general in Belfast, Edinburgh and Manchester.; See also Poles in the United Kingdom

=== Oceania ===
Country	Formal Relations Began	Notes
Australia	February 1972	See Australia–Poland relations: Australia has an embassy in Warsaw.; Poland has an embassy in Canberra and a consulate-general in Sydney.; Both countries are full members of the OECD.
Micronesia	12 February 2019	Both countries established diplomatic relations on 12 February 2019.: Poland is accredited to Micronesia from its embassy in Canberra, Australia.; Micronesia currently does not have an accredited ambassador to Poland.
New Zealand	1 March 1973	See New Zealand–Poland relations: New Zealand has an embassy in Warsaw.; Poland has an embassy in Wellington.; Both countries are full members of the OECD.
Papua New Guinea		See Papua New Guinea–Poland relations: Papua New Guinea is accredited to Poland from its embassy in Brussels.; Poland is accredited to Papua New Guinea from its embassy in Canberra, and there is an honorary consulate of Poland in Madang.
Solomon Islands	6 March 2012	Both countries established diplomatic relations on 6 March 2012.: Poland is accredited to the Solomon Islands from its embassy in Canberra, Australia.; Solomon Islands are accredited to Poland from its embassy Brussels, Belgium.

== Regional blocs ==
Bloc	Countries
Lublin Triangle	Ukraine • Poland • Lithuania
British–Polish–Ukrainian trilateral pact	Ukraine • Poland • United Kingdom
Weimar Triangle	France • Germany • Poland

== See also ==
- List of diplomatic missions in Poland
- List of diplomatic missions of Poland
- Polish involvement in the 2003 invasion of Iraq
- Poland in the European Union
