= Kenya–Poland relations =

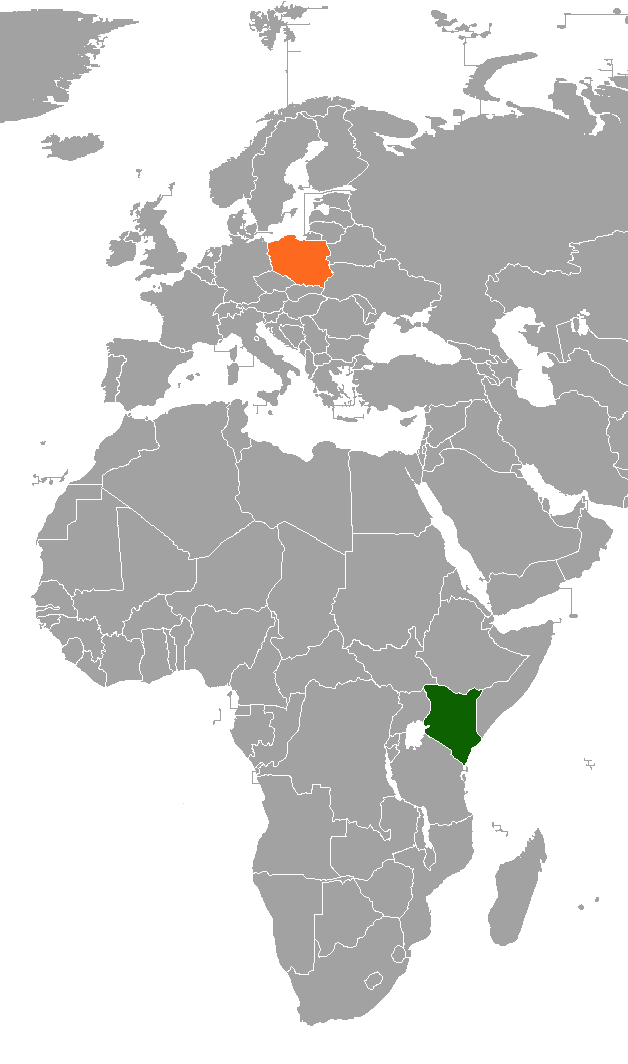
- Kenya: Poland

Kenya–Poland relations are the diplomatic relations between Kenya and Poland. Both nations are members of the United Nations and the World Trade Organization.

== History ==
A consulate of Poland was located in Nairobi from 1939 to 1945.

Between 1942 and 1944, 18,000 Polish refugees arrived at the Kenyan port city of Mombasa. The refugees were part of a larger exodus of between 320,000 and a million Polish evacuees who were deported from Soviet-occupied eastern Poland by the Soviet Union during World War II and sent to the eastern parts of the Soviet Union incl. Siberia. With the assistance of Anders' Army, approximately 110,000 Polish evacuees left the Soviet Union to Persia and 18,000 of those refugees were sent to East Africa.

Once the Polish refugees arrived in Mombasa, many were sent to the nearby British territories of Rhodesia, Tanzania and Uganda. The refugees who stayed in Kenya were sent to settlement camps in Makindu, Manira, Nairobi, Nyali and Rongai. The refugees would remain in Kenya until 1949 when many were resettled to Australia, Canada and the United Kingdom.

In 1945, Poland regained its independence after the war. On 12 December 1963, Kenya obtained its independence from the United Kingdom and on 13 December 1963, Poland recognized and established diplomatic relations with Kenya. In 1964, Poland opened a resident embassy in Nairobi.

Initially, relations between both nations were mainly administered in multilateral forums such as at the United Nations. Soon after the establishment of diplomatic relations, several hundred Kenyan nationals would travel to Poland to study at Polish universities on government scholarships. In June 2014, both nations signed a Memorandum of Understanding to increase trade. Since 2016, Kenya has been one of Poland's main priorities in development aid assistance. Poland considers Kenya one of its main partners in sub-Saharan Africa. In September 2021, Poland donated over 210,000 COVID-19 vaccines to Kenya. Kenya was the first African country to receive such aid from Poland.

== High-level visits ==
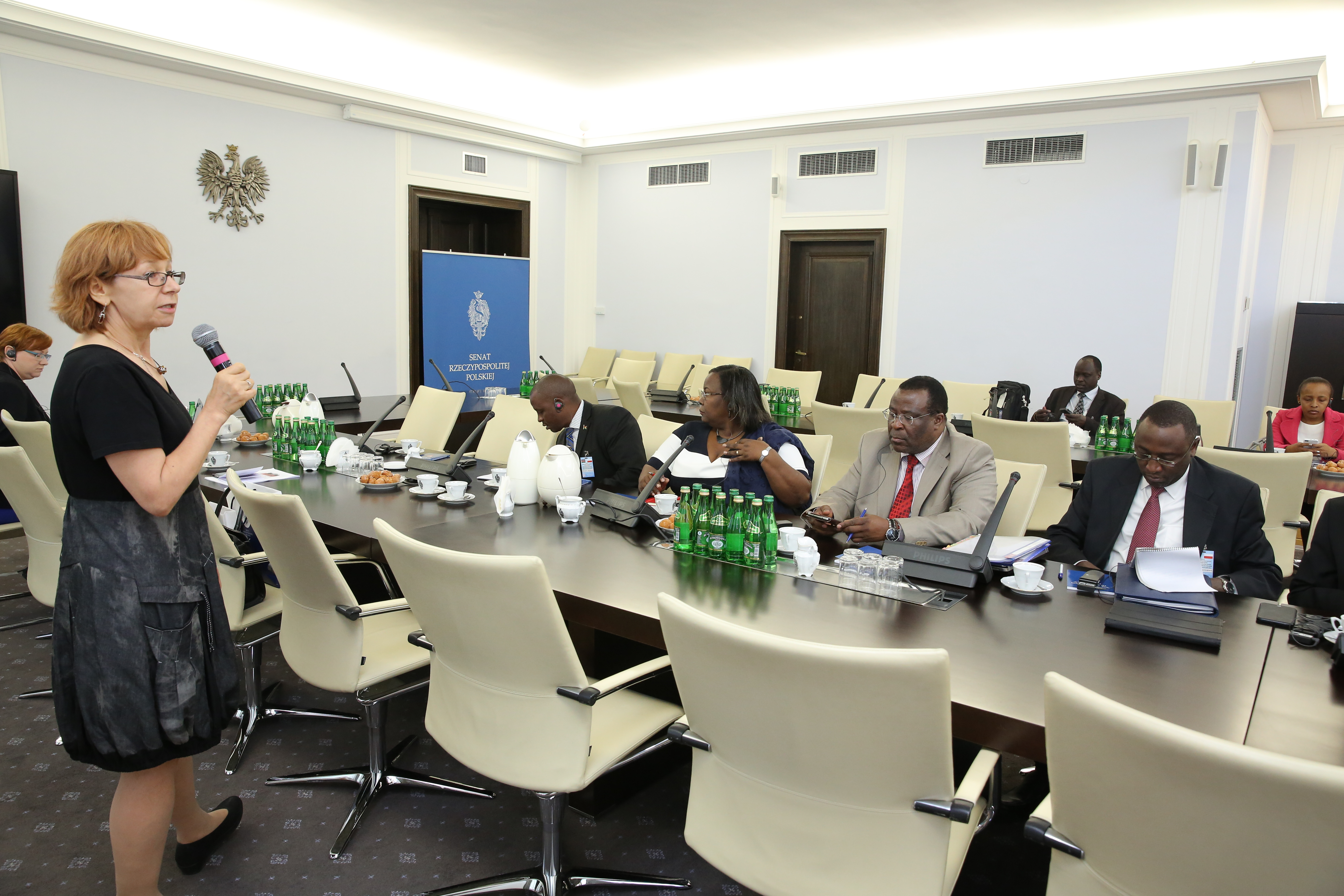
Kenyan senators and speaker of the Kenyan Senate Ekwee Ethuro during a visit in the Senate of Poland in Warsaw in 2015

High-level visits from Kenya to Poland

- Foreign Minister Kalonzo Musyoka (1995)
- Trade Minister Mukhisa Kituyi (2004)
- Deputy Foreign Minister Richard Momoima Onyonka (2010)
- Speaker of the Kenyan Senate Ekwee Ethuro (2015)

High-level visits from Poland to Kenya

- Foreign Minister Krzysztof Skubiszewski (1993)
- Foreign Undersecretary Bogusław Zaleski (2002)
- Foreign Minister Włodzimierz Cimoszewicz (2004)
- Foreign Undersecretary Witold Waszczykowski (2007)
- Foreign Minister Radosław Sikorski (2009)
- Foreign Undersecretary Grażyna Bernatowicz (2010)
- Deputy Foreign Minister Paweł Jabłoński (2021)

== Transportation ==
There are direct seasonal flights between Mombasa and Warsaw with LOT Polish Airlines.

== Trade ==
In October 2014 the East African Community (which includes Kenya) and the European Union (which included Poland) finalized a free trade agreement. The free trade agreement has not yet come into force. In 2018, trade between Kenya and Poland totaled US$93 million. Kenya's exports to Poland include: tea, canned pineapples, cut flowers, coffee, fish, and sisal bags. Poland's exports to Kenya include: textiles, machinery, electronics and vehicles. In 2017 Poland opened a trade office in Nairobi.

== Resident diplomatic missions ==
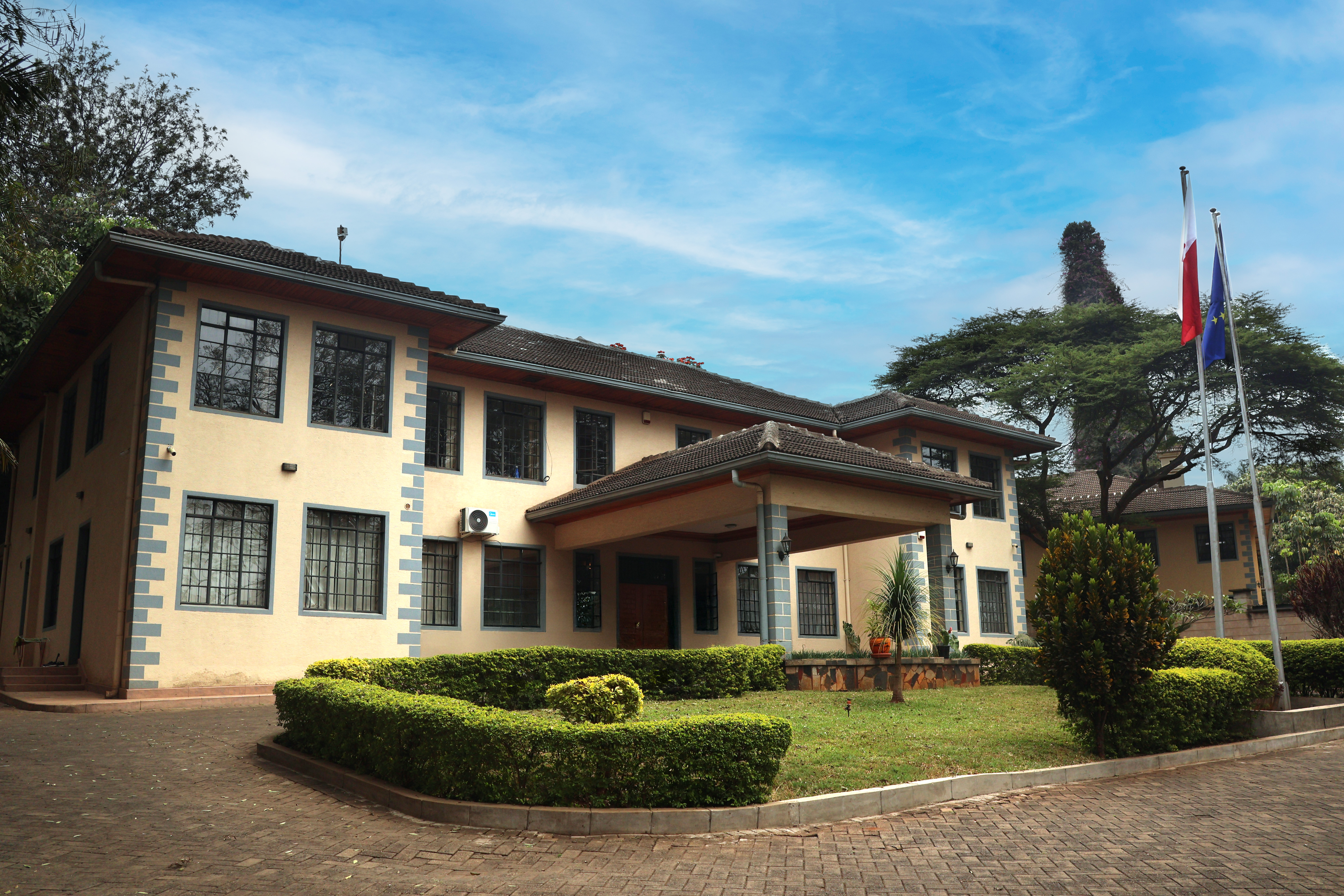
Embassy of Poland in Nairobi

- Kenya is accredited to Poland from its embassy in Rome, Italy.
- Poland has an embassy in Nairobi.

== See also ==
- Foreign relations of Kenya
- Foreign relations of Poland
- Evacuation of Polish civilians from the USSR in World War II
- Eustachy Sapieha
