= Poland–Senegal relations =

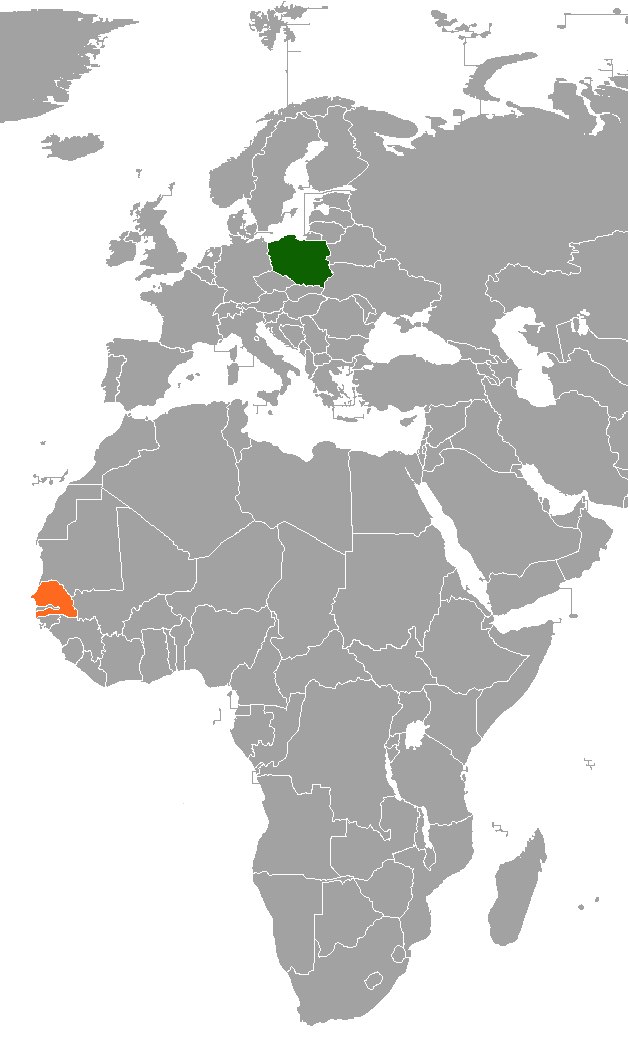
- Poland: Senegal

Poland–Senegal relations are bilateral relations between Poland and Senegal. Relations focus on economic and educational cooperation, and development assistance. Both nations are full members of the World Trade Organization and the United Nations.

== History ==
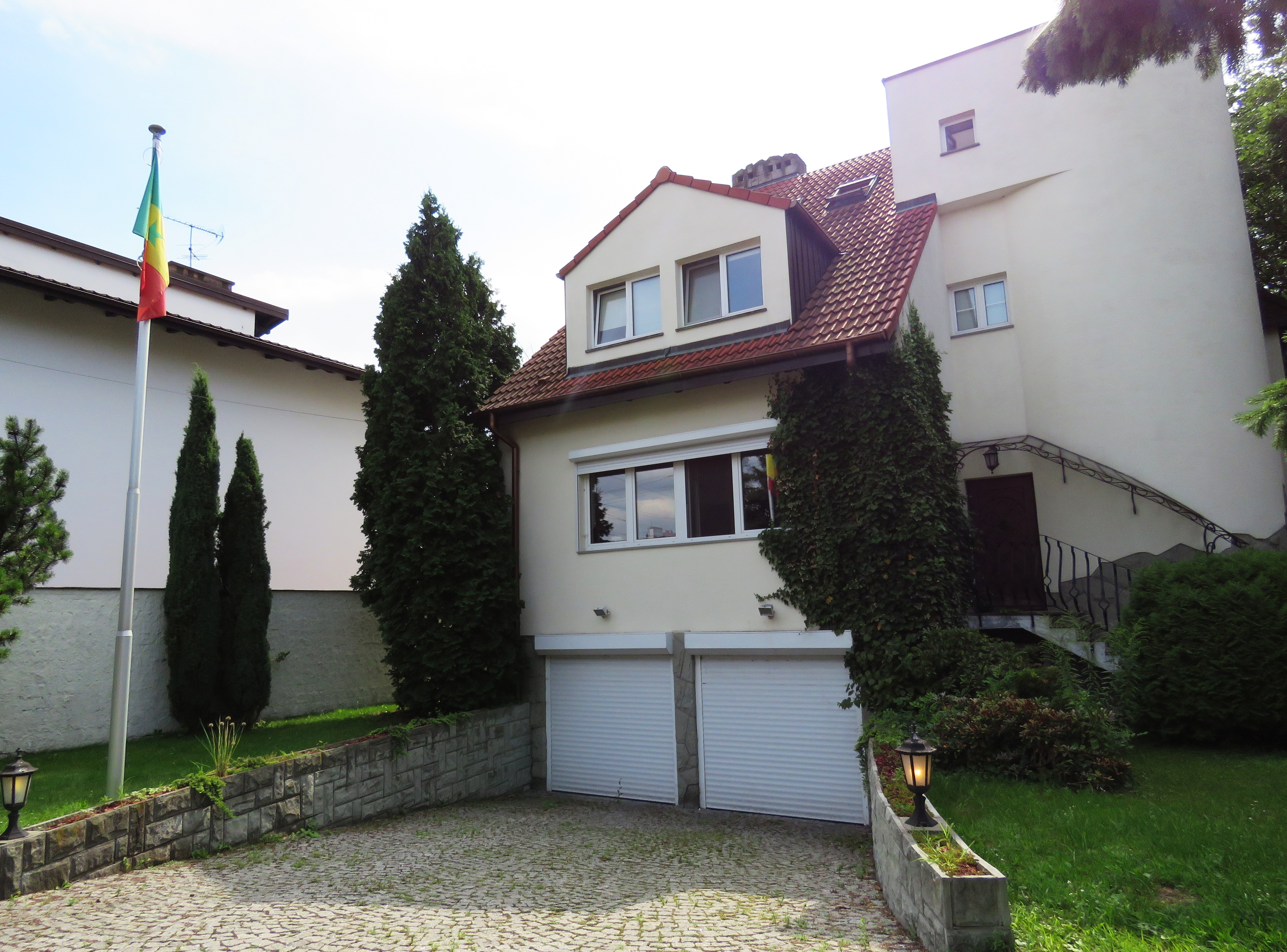
Embassy of Senegal in Warsaw

An honorary consulate of Poland was located in Dakar from 1935 to 1945.

Polish troops and Senegalese Tirailleurs both fought against Nazi Germany in World War II. On 16–17 June 1940, Poles and Senegalese led by General Stanisław Maczek fought side by side against the Germans in the victorious Battle of Montbard. Fallen Polish and Senegalese soldiers were buried side by side at the local cemetery. Poles and Senegalese were also part of the large Allied coalition in the Battle of Monte Cassino of 1944. Senegalese prisoners of war were held by the Germans alike Polish and other Allied POWs in the Stalag 307, Stalag II-D, Stalag II-B and Stalag VIII-C POW camps, located in Dęblin, Stargard, Czarne and Żagań, respectively. Both Senegalese and Polish POWs were subjected to poor treatment by the Germans, who regarded them as "racially inferior". Poland's gold reserve, evacuated from Poland during the German-Soviet invasion in 1939, was transported via Senegal to present-day Mali, where it was stored for several years before being transported to the United States in 1944, to be returned to Poland at the end of the occupation and World War II.

Poland recognized Senegal in 1960, shortly after the Senegalese declaration of independence, and afterwards bilateral relations were established. In the early 1960s, the first trade and science and technology cooperation agreements were signed and Senegalese students were given the opportunity to study at Polish universities. Already in the 1960s, Senegal became Poland's main trading partner in West Africa.

Polish and Senegalese military contingents cooperated as part of the UNEF II peacekeeping mission in the Sinai Peninsula in the 1970s, with the Poles providing transportation for Senegalese troops and equipment.

A number of Polish missionaries worked in Senegal, starting with Jan Krzyżanowski, who lived there from 1932 until his death in 1963, making efforts to discover cures for yellow fever and other tropical diseases. Further missionaries worked in service of local Senegalese communities as teachers, caretakers or directors of schools and boarding schools, nurses in clinics and hospitals, etc.

== Modern relations ==
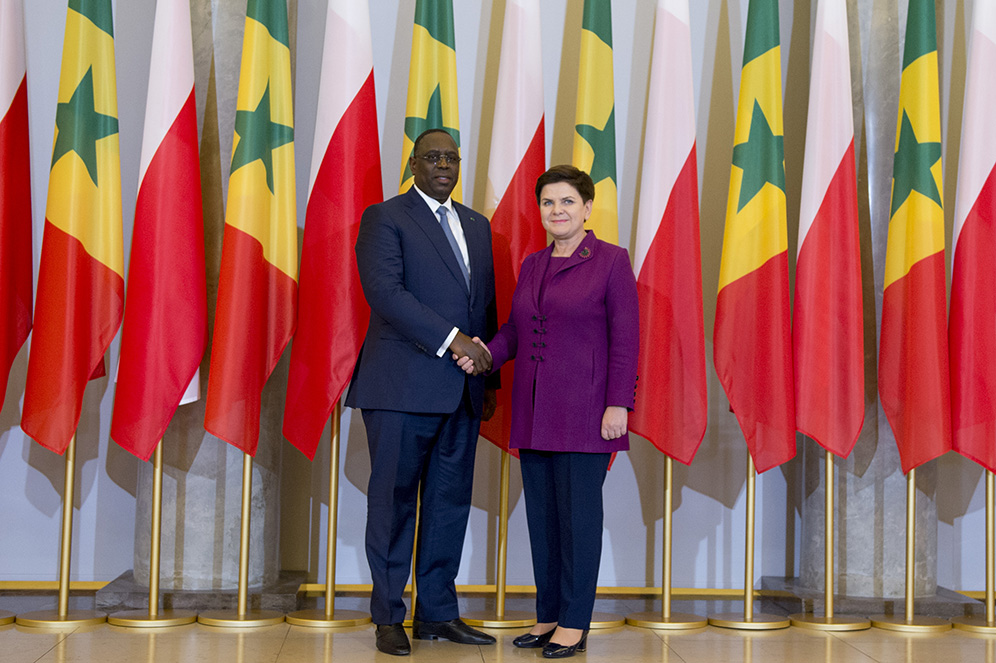
Meeting of Prime Minister of Poland Beata Szydło and President of Senegal Macky Sall in Warsaw, 2016

Both countries are fostering university cooperation. Since 2015, the Gdynia Maritime University, along with a private Polish company from Toruń, has been working with the Senegalese government on the construction of the Fisheries College in Dakar.

2016 saw the first Senegalese presidential visit to Poland. In addition to meeting with Polish President Andrzej Duda and Prime Minister Beata Szydło, Macky Sall visited the country's chief port city of Gdańsk. Macky Sall declared Senegal's support for Poland's candidacy for the non-permanent member seat in the United Nations Security Council.

In 2017, Polish company WZL-1 of the Polish Armaments Group overhauled and modernised three helicopters of the Senegalese Air Force.

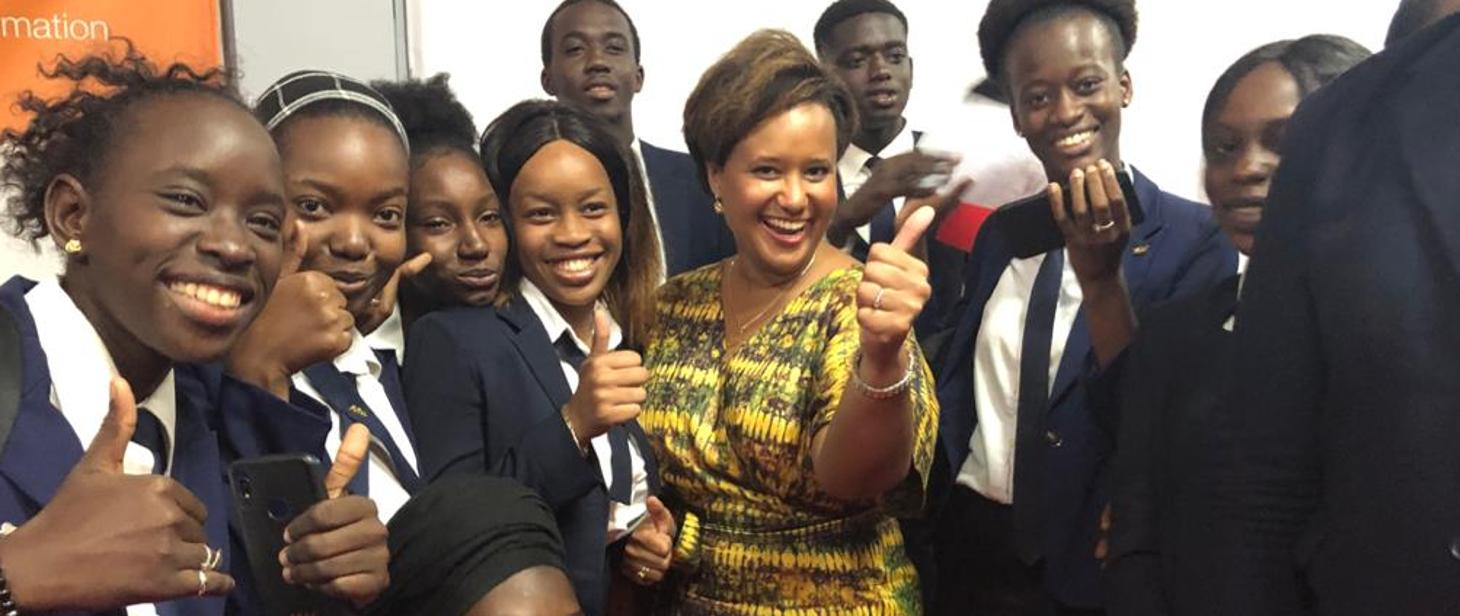
Ambassador of Poland to Senegal Margareta Kassangana with students of the Institut Supérieur de Management in Dakar, 2019

The Polish Medical Mission provides professional courses for Senegalese medical workers and donates medical equipment to Senegal, co-funded by the Ministry of Foreign Affairs of Poland.

In 2022, Presidents Andrzej Duda and Macky Sall signed new cooperation agreements in Dakar and declared their intention to strengthen cooperation in various fields, including agriculture, maritime training, education and industry.

All imports from Senegal to Poland are duty-free and quota-free, with the exception of armaments, as part of the Everything but Arms initiative of the European Union.

== Diplomatic missions ==
- Poland has an embassy in Dakar.
- Senegal has an embassy in Warsaw.

== See also ==
- Foreign relations of Poland
- Foreign relations of Senegal
