= Libya–Poland relations =

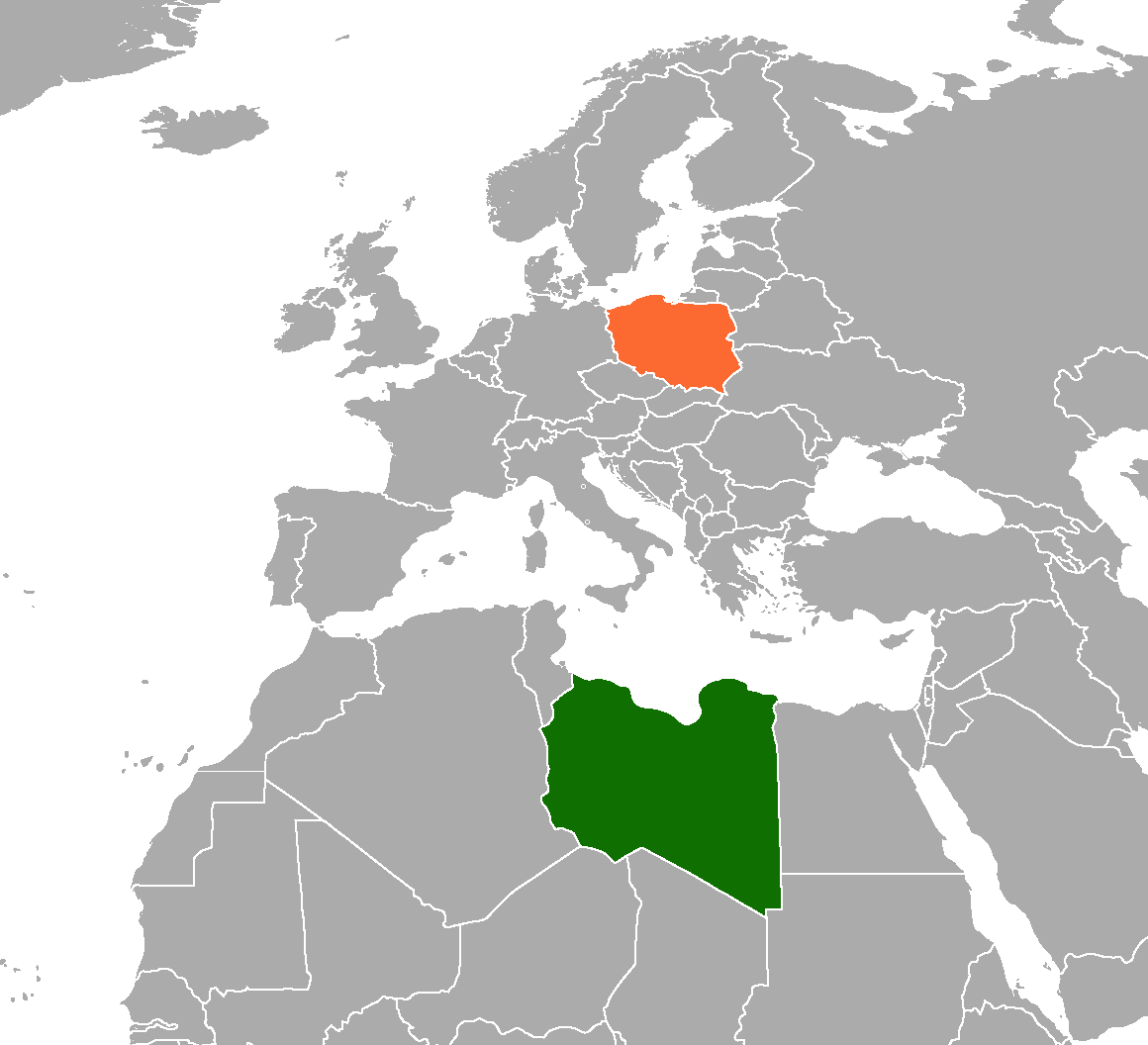

- Libya: Poland

Libya–Poland relations are the bilateral relations between Libya and Republic of Poland. The two countries are members of the United Nations.

== History ==
=== 20th century ===
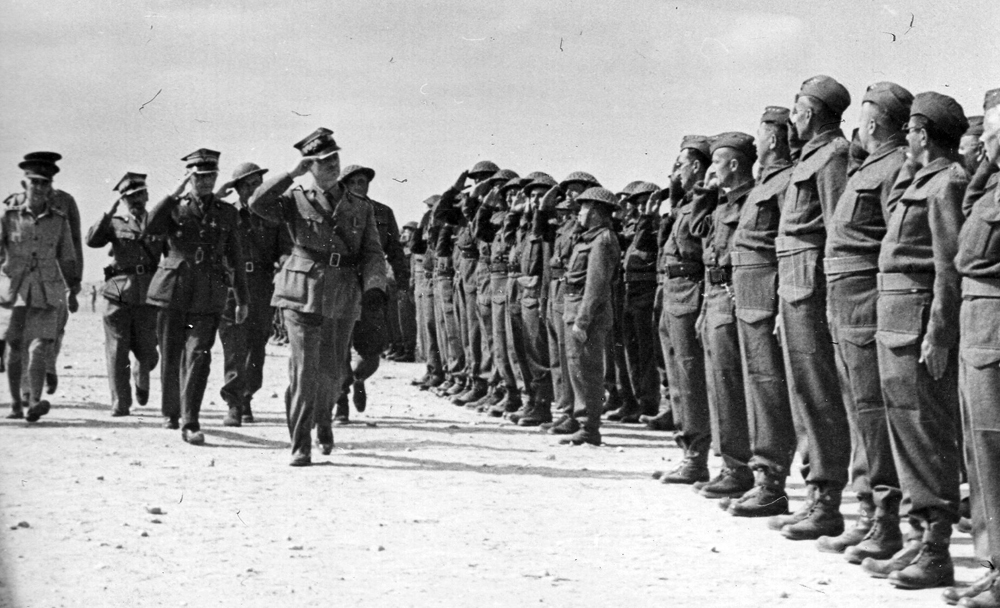
General Władysław Sikorski and the Polish Independent Carpathian Rifle Brigade in Tobruk in 1941

During World War II, Poles and Libyans were part of the Allied coalition, which successfully defended Tobruk during an Axis siege. There is a Polish military cemetery in Tobruk, and the battle is also commemorated at the Tomb of the Unknown Soldier in Warsaw. Afterwards, in late 1941, the Poles fought against Axis forces in present-day Libya in Gazala and Bardia. In December 1941, the Polish ship SS Warszawa, which carried Allied soldiers, mostly Libyans, was hit and sunk by the Germans near Tobruk. Four crew members and 19 soldiers were killed.

In 1949, Poland opposed a British-French-American protectorate over Libya and supported Libya's full independence in the following years.

Both countries established diplomatic relations on 2 December 1963. A cultural cooperation agreement between Poland and Libya was signed in Tripoli in 1976. An agreement for exchanging Libyan oil for Polish technical expertise and equipment was also concluded. In 1978, Libya was the largest importer of Polish goods among so-called Third World countries. In the early 1980s, over 10,000 Polish specialists were employed in various industrial projects and medical facilities and in Libya.

=== Recent history ===
Poland at the mid-2000s like the rest of West countries started to turn its eyes back on Libya after almost 20 years of absence. At the beginning of the civil war, the Polish government was not eager to participate in any military action in Libya, but called the other members of NATO and European Union to use other ways, but prime minister Donald Tusk assured that Poland would take part in some "community activities." At the same time, Polish NGOs started the preparations to help eastern Libya. The position of government concern Libya has not changed with the beginning of Military intervention in Libya.

The diplomatic relations with NTC were established during the visit of Polish FM Radosław Sikorski to Benghazi on 11 May, when he announced the recognition of the NTC as "rightful interlocutor for the international community (...) in Libya" Poland was the only country that opened its embassy in Benghazi. On 8 July, the Minister noticed the Polish recognition of NTC as the "legitimate government of the Libyan people". Poland was also member of Libya Contact Group, where it offered to launch humanitarian help and training for state officials and new law and order services. There are unofficial reports that Poland was sending weapons and officers of Polish Special Forces. Ahmed El-Mallul, a Libyan surgeon in Poland, was a mediator between the NTC and the Polish government. On 15 September Poland reopened its embassy in Tripoli and started to prepare ground for humanitarian help, which arrived on 3 October in Misrata Also Libyan representatives were in Poland at the parliamentary elections on 6–11 October 2011. Next visit of foreign minister took place on 24 October in Tripoli. Three days later Libyan decedents decided to strengthen bilateral relations and notify Polish MFA about upgrading its Economic Cooperation Bureau in Warsaw to the rank of Embassy and establish a joint Libyan-Polish commission headed by its Ministers of Foreign Affairs.

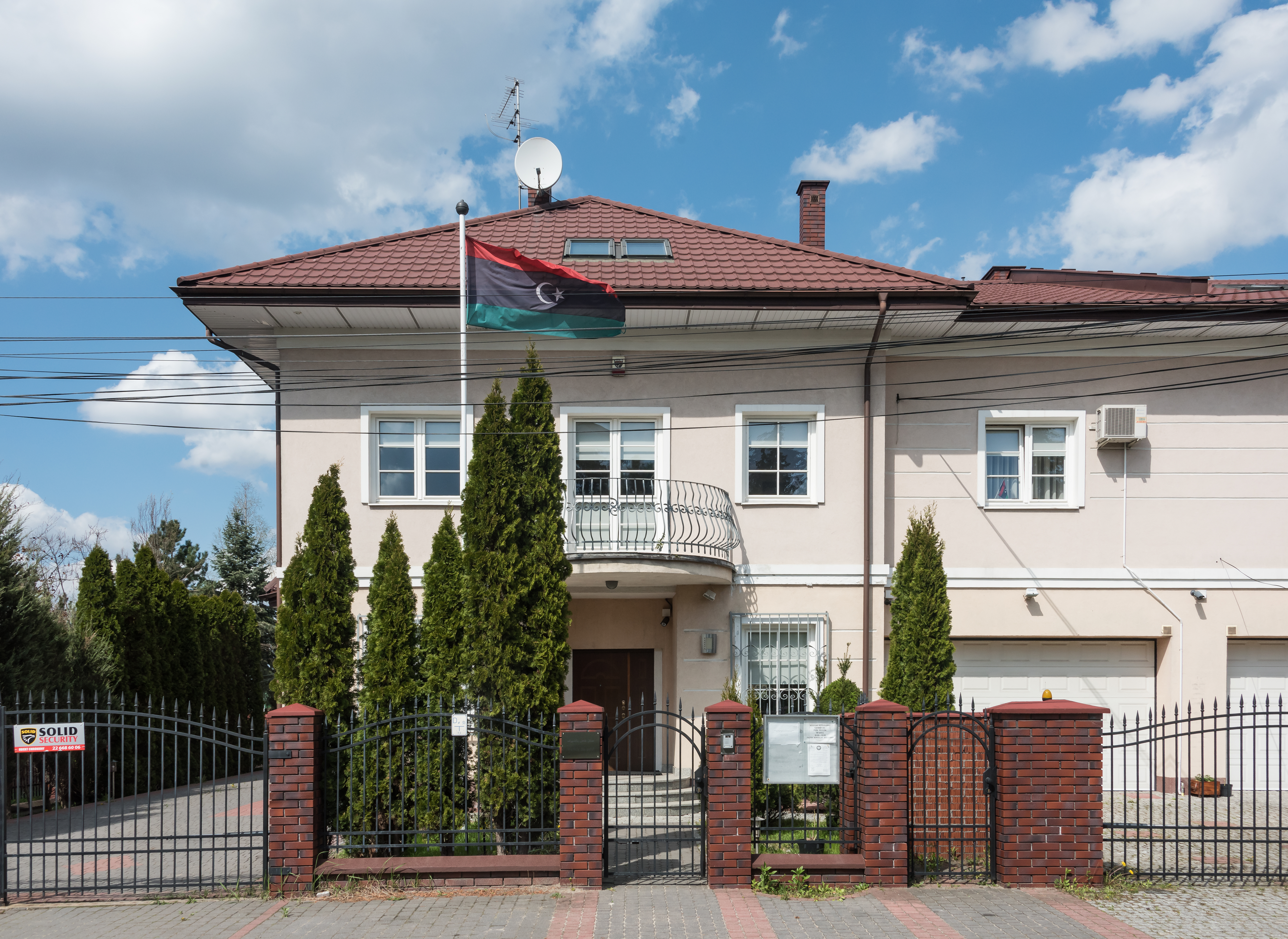
Embassy of Libya in Warsaw

== Resident diplomatic missions ==
- Libya has an embassy in Warsaw.
- Poland has an embassy in Tripoli.

== See also ==
- Foreign relations of Libya
- Foreign relations of Poland

== Bibliography ==
- Knopek, Jacek (2006). "Stosunki Polski z Afryką Arabską po II wojnie światowej". Forum Politologiczne (in Polish). 3. Instytut Nauk Politycznych Uniwersytetu Warmińsko-Mazurskiego w Olsztynie. ISSN 1734-1698.
- Gasztold, Przemysław; Solarz, Jarosław (2022). "Arms, Advisors and Weapons of Mass Destruction: Polish-Libyan Military Cooperation, 1970-1990". The International History Review. 44 (4): 791–811. doi:10.1080/07075332.2021.1991978. ISSN 0707-5332.
