= Poland–South Africa relations =

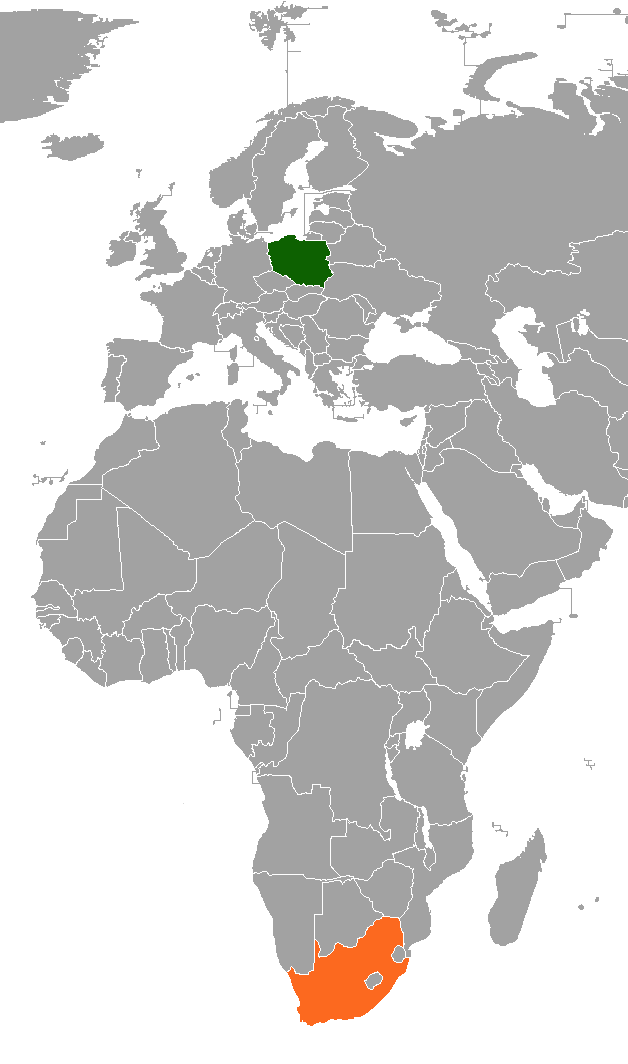
- Poland: South Africa

Poland–South Africa relations are the bilateral relations between Poland and South Africa. Both nations are members of the United Nations and the World Trade Organization.

== History ==
=== Interbellum ===
In the interbellum, a Consulate-General of Poland was founded in Cape Town in 1929, and a consular agency (later consulate) of Poland was founded in Johannesburg in 1938.

=== World War II ===
South Africa declared war on Germany on 6 September 1939, the sixth day of the German invasion of Poland, which started World War II. Some 12,000 Polish soldiers passed through South Africa during the war. Polish soldiers trained there before resuming fighting against Nazi Germany, most notably at a training centre near Pietermaritzburg, and wounded Polish troops were treated in hospitals in Durban, Johannesburg, and Pietermaritzburg. Polish civilians, mainly sailors, also made stops there. Two more consulates of Poland were established, in Pretoria in 1940 and Durban in 1942. In mid-1942, the South African government refused to admit Polish refugees from German- and Soviet-occupied Poland, however, it eventually agreed to admit 500 Polish orphans, which, along with 38 childcare workers, were received in Oudtshoorn in 1943. In 1944–1945, the Polish newspaper Krzyż Południa ("Cross of the South") and English-language newspaper Polish Digest were issued in Oudtshoorn and Johannesburg, respectively.

Memorial to the victims of the German-perpetrated Stalag Luft III murders, including Poles and South Africans, in Żagań, Poland

South African prisoners of war were held by the Germans alike Polish and other Allied POWs in the Oflag XXI-B, Stalag Luft IV, Stalag Luft 7, Stalag VIII-A, Stalag XX-A, Stalag XX-B, Stalag XXI-B, Stalag Luft III and Stalag VIII-C POW camps, located in Szubin, Tychowo, Bąków, Zgorzelec, Toruń, Malbork, Tur and Żagań, respectively. Several Poles and South Africans were among the victims of the Stalag Luft III murders, perpetrated by Germany in 1944.

Poles and South Africans were part of the large Allied coalition in the Battle of Monte Cassino of 1944.

=== Post-war period ===
In 1988, the first semi-official diplomatic contacts between Poland and South Africa took place. In April 1989, the Ministries of Foreign Affairs of both countries agreed on consular protection for the Polish diaspora in South Africa via the Polish embassy in Gaborone, Botswana. In 1990, an agreement was signed to establish Interests Bureaus in both Pretoria and in Warsaw. On 18 December 1991, diplomatic relations between both nations were formally established and both nations' respective Interest Bureaus were upgraded to the rank of embassies.

In 1992, South African President F. W. de Klerk paid an official visit to Poland and met with Polish President Lech Wałęsa. In 2004, South African Deputy President Jacob Zuma paid a visit to Poland. In December 2013, Polish Prime Minister Donald Tusk, along with Foreign Minister Radosław Sikorski and former President Lech Wałęsa; paid a visit to South Africa to attend the funeral of former President Nelson Mandela. In 2014, South African Deputy President Kgalema Motlanthe also paid a visit to Poland.

Poland perceives South Africa as a priority partner in Africa, both in terms of bilateral relations and in the context of the strategic partnership between South Africa and the European Union. Since the establishment of diplomatic relations, both nations have worked together to strengthen bilateral cooperation as well as multilateral relations. Both countries have cooperated in many initiatives at the United Nations, especially in the field of human rights protection.

A year into the Russian invasion of Ukraine South Africa banned the sale of South African made arms to Poland arguing that they might be used to support Ukraine and thereby damage Russian-South African relations. Export permits for artillery ammunition sales to Poland have not been granted while applications to supply munitions to Turkey and the UAE have been accepted. On 20 August 2024 a contract for 50,000 155-millimeter shells ordered by Poland was terminated.

== High-level visits ==
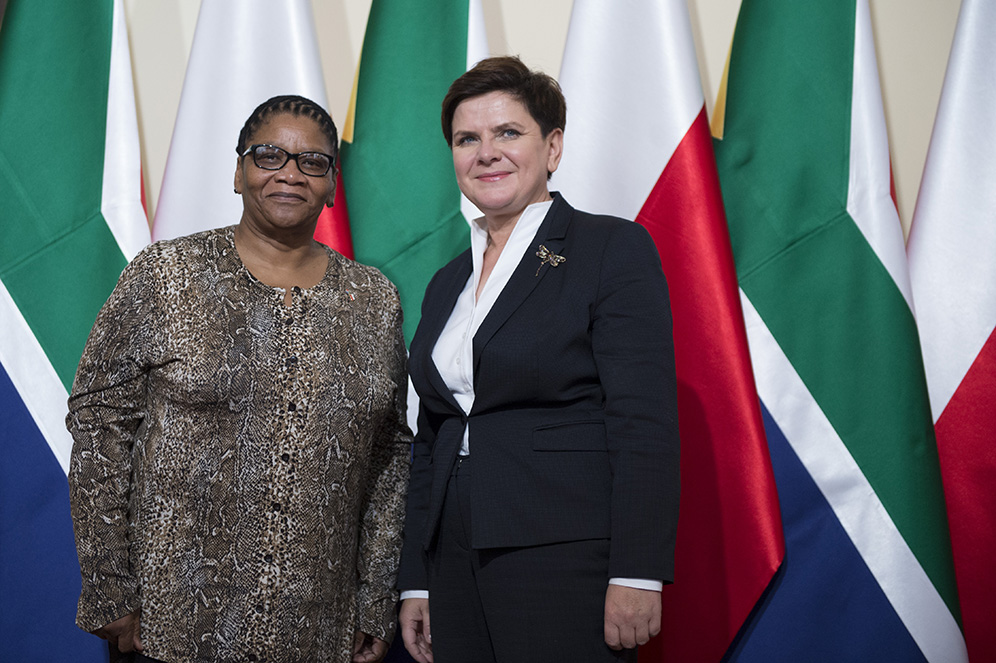
Meeting of Prime Minister of Poland Beata Szydło and Chairperson of the National Council of Provinces of South Africa Thandi Modise in Warsaw in 2016

High-level visits from Poland to South Africa

- Foreign Minister Krzysztof Skubiszewski (1993)
- Foreign Minister Władysław Bartoszewski (1995)
- Undersecretary of State Mariusz Handzlik (2009)
- Prime Minister Donald Tusk (2013)
- Foreign Minister Radosław Sikorski (2013)

High-level visits from South Africa to Poland

- President F. W. de Klerk (1992)
- Foreign Minister Pik Botha (1992)
- Foreign Minister Alfred Baphethuxolo Nzo (1994)
- Deputy Foreign Minister Aziz Pahad (1996)
- Deputy President Jacob Zuma (2004)
- Foreign Undersecretary Susan van der Merwe (2007)
- Foreign Minister Maite Nkoana-Mashabane (2011)
- Deputy President Kgalema Motlanthe (2014)

== Bilateral agreements ==
Both nations have signed several bilateral agreements such as an Agreement for the establishment of Permanent Office of Interests in both nations respective capitals (1990); Agreement on the abolition of visa requirements for holders of Diplomatic and Service Passports (1992); Agreement on Air Transportation (1993); Agreement for the Avoidance of Double Taxation with respect to Taxes on Income (1995); Agreement for a protocol on consultations between the Polish Ministry of Foreign Affairs and the South African Department of International Relations and Cooperation (1995); Agreement on Industrial, Technological and Commercial Cooperation within the scope of the Military Industries (1999) and an Agreement on Scientific and Technological Cooperation (1999).

== Resident diplomatic missions ==
- Poland has an embassy in Pretoria.
- South Africa has an embassy in Warsaw.
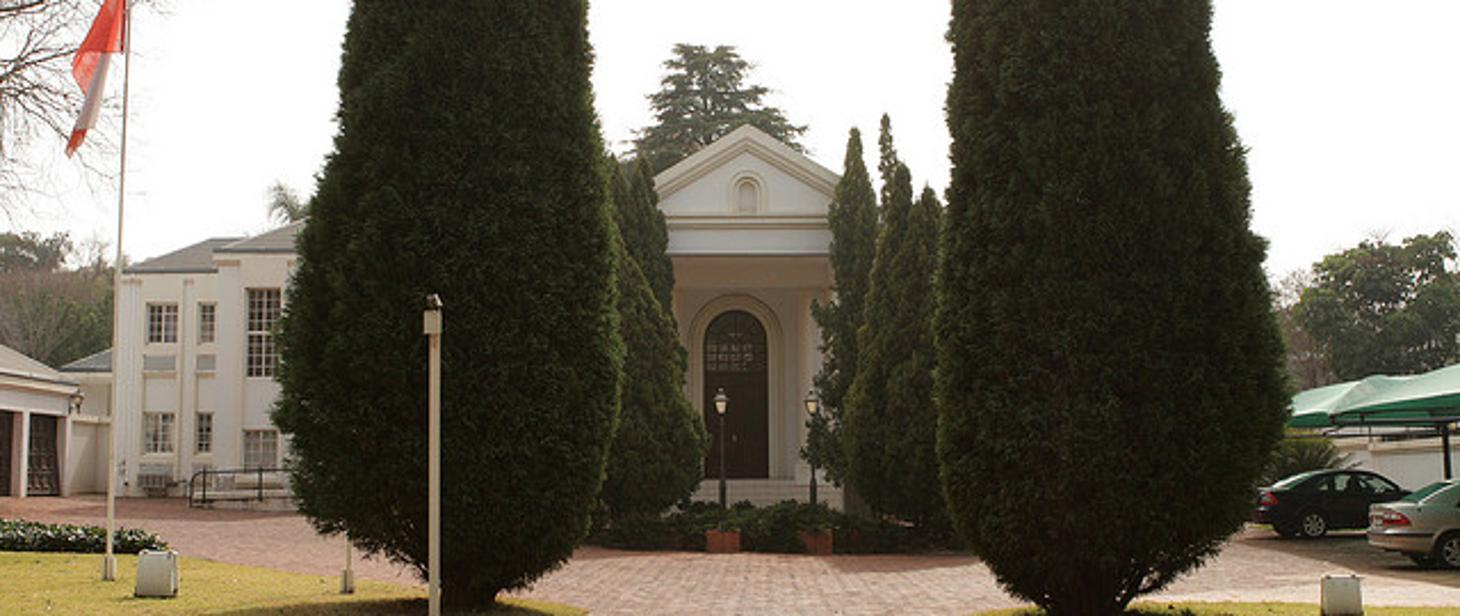
Embassy of Poland in Pretoria

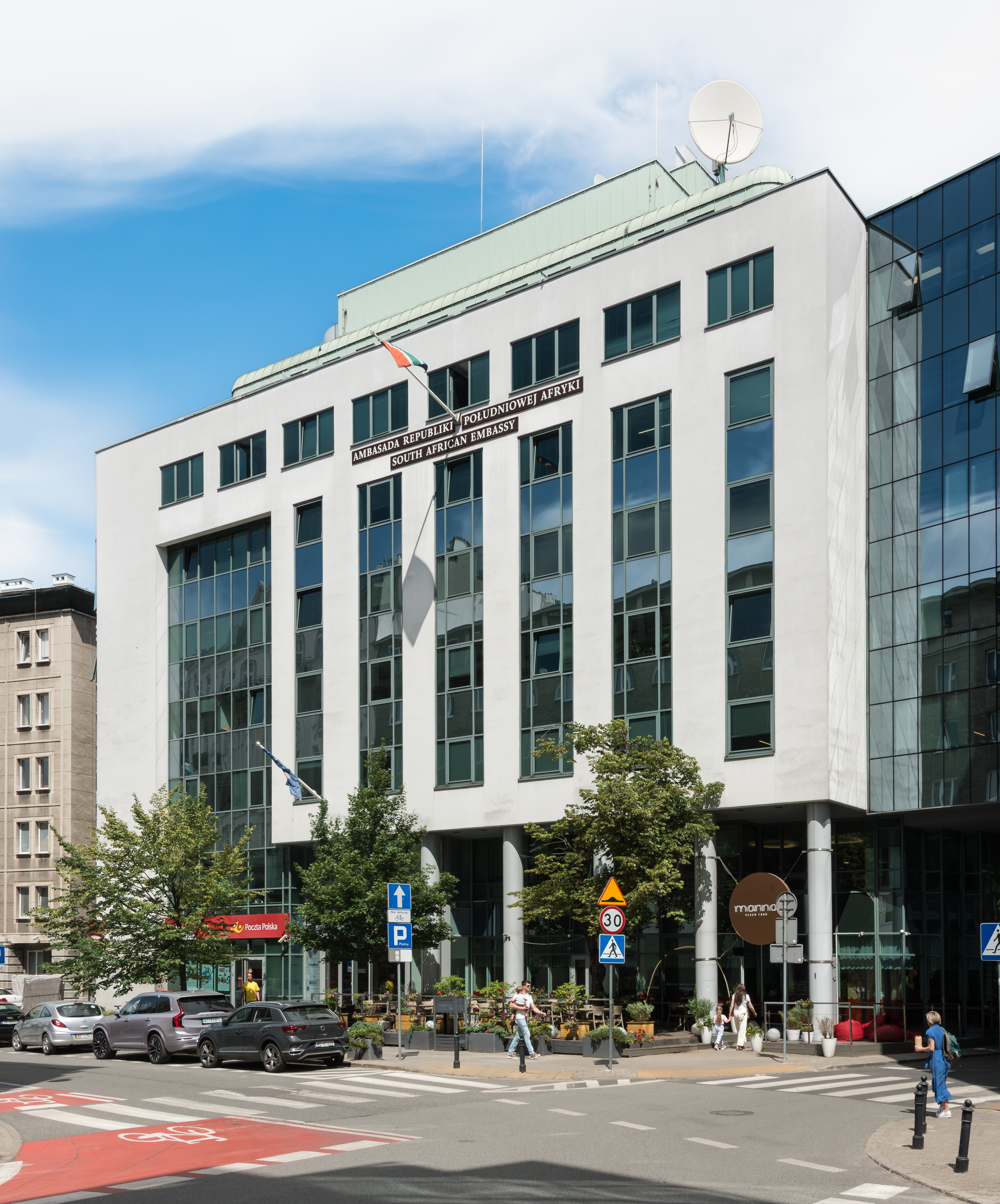
Embassy of South Africa in Warsaw

== See also ==
- Foreign relations of Poland
- Foreign relations of South Africa
- Polish diaspora
