= Finland–Poland relations =

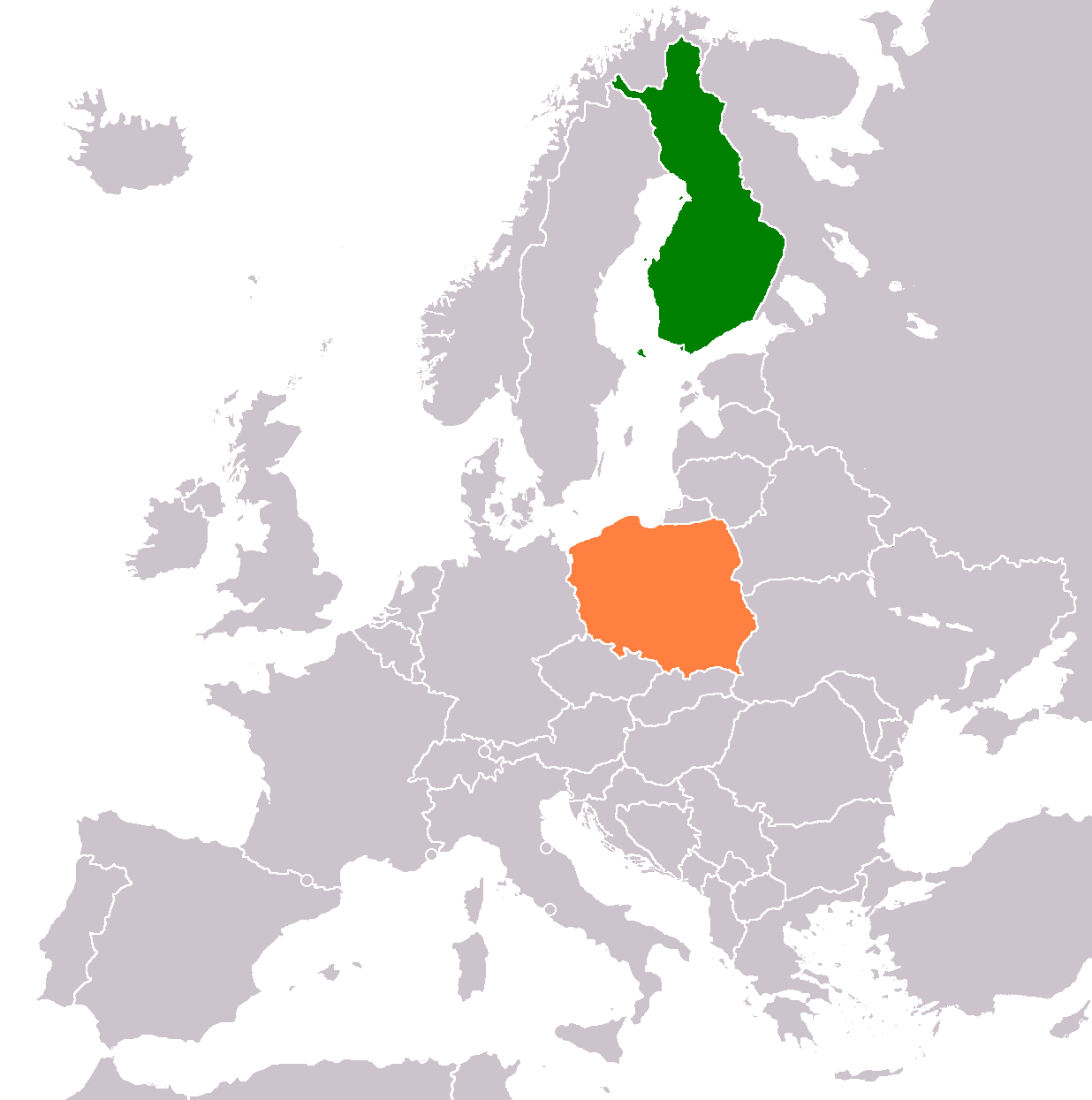
- Finland: Poland

Diplomatic mission
- Embassy of Finland, Warsaw: Embassy of Poland, Helsinki

Finland–Poland relations refer to bilateral relations of Finland and Poland. Finland has an embassy in Warsaw. Poland has an embassy in Helsinki. Both countries are members of the European Union, NATO, OECD, OSCE, Council of the Baltic Sea States, HELCOM, Council of Europe and the World Trade Organization. Both countries established diplomatic relations on 8 March 1919.

== History ==
Poland and Finland were once united by a personal union under the Polish–Swedish union during the reign of King Sigismund III Vasa.

In 1917, the Polish Legion in Finland was formed to fight for Finnish independence and then stationed in Viipuri. It fought in various battles during the Finnish Civil War of 1918, contributing to the Finnish victory. Afterwards, some 2,500 Polish soldiers were evacuated to Poland, where they fought against the invading Soviets.

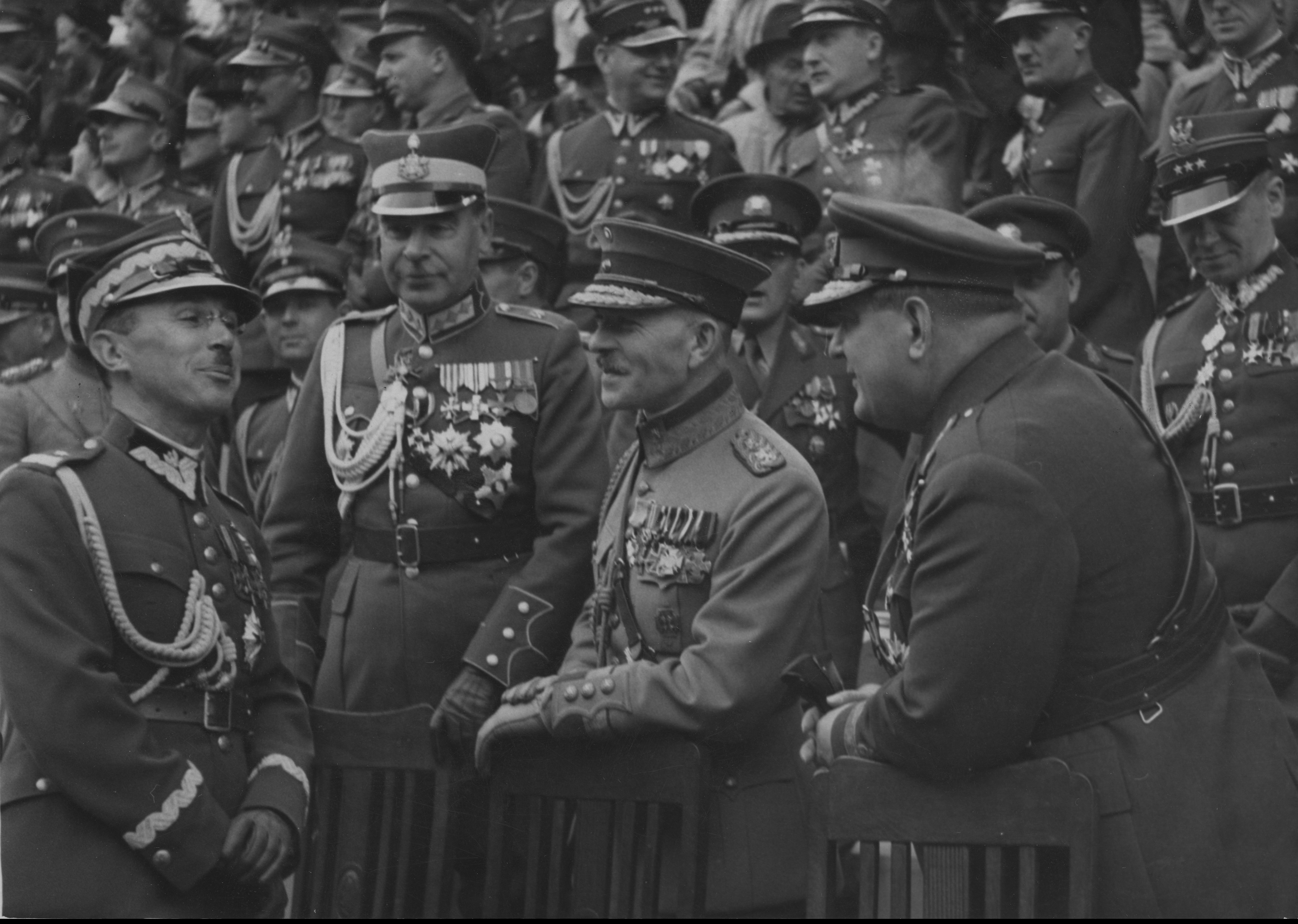
Chiefs of the General Staffs of Poland, Finland, Latvia and Estonia before a military parade in 1937

In 1922, Poland, Finland, Estonia and Latvia were the signatories of the Warsaw Accord, which however did not enter into force, as Finland did not ratify it under pressure of Germany, which was hostile to Poland. Instead, in 1925, Poland, Finland, Estonia and Latvia signed a convention on conciliation and arbitration in Helsinki.

In 1937–1938, both ethnic Poles and Finns in the Soviet Union were subjected to genocidal campaigns carried out by the NKVD, known as the Polish Operation and the Finnish Operation respectively. In 1939, both countries were victims of the German-Soviet Molotov–Ribbentrop Pact, according to which they were to be divided into "spheres of influence" between Nazi Germany and the Soviet Union. After the subsequent German-Soviet invasion of Poland at the start of World War II, Polish diplomats and consuls with families (apart from those arrested by the Soviets) were evacuated from the Soviet Union to Finland in October 1939. Later on, in November 1939, Finland became the second country to be invaded by the Soviet Union during World War II. The Polish government-in-exile was willing to assist Finland militarily against the Soviets by establishing a Polish air squadron in neighboring Sweden, a plan that collapsed due to Sweden's refusal out of fear of the Germans and Soviets and its claimed neutrality. Finnish requests for Polish naval assistance at the Arctic Circle to unblock the supply route through Petsamo were unsuccessful amid Britain's refusal. As a result of World War II, both Finland and Poland lost their eastern territories to the Soviet Union, although Finland, unlike Poland, successfully retained independence while Poland fell under a quasi-colonial rule by the Soviet Union.

== Modern relations ==
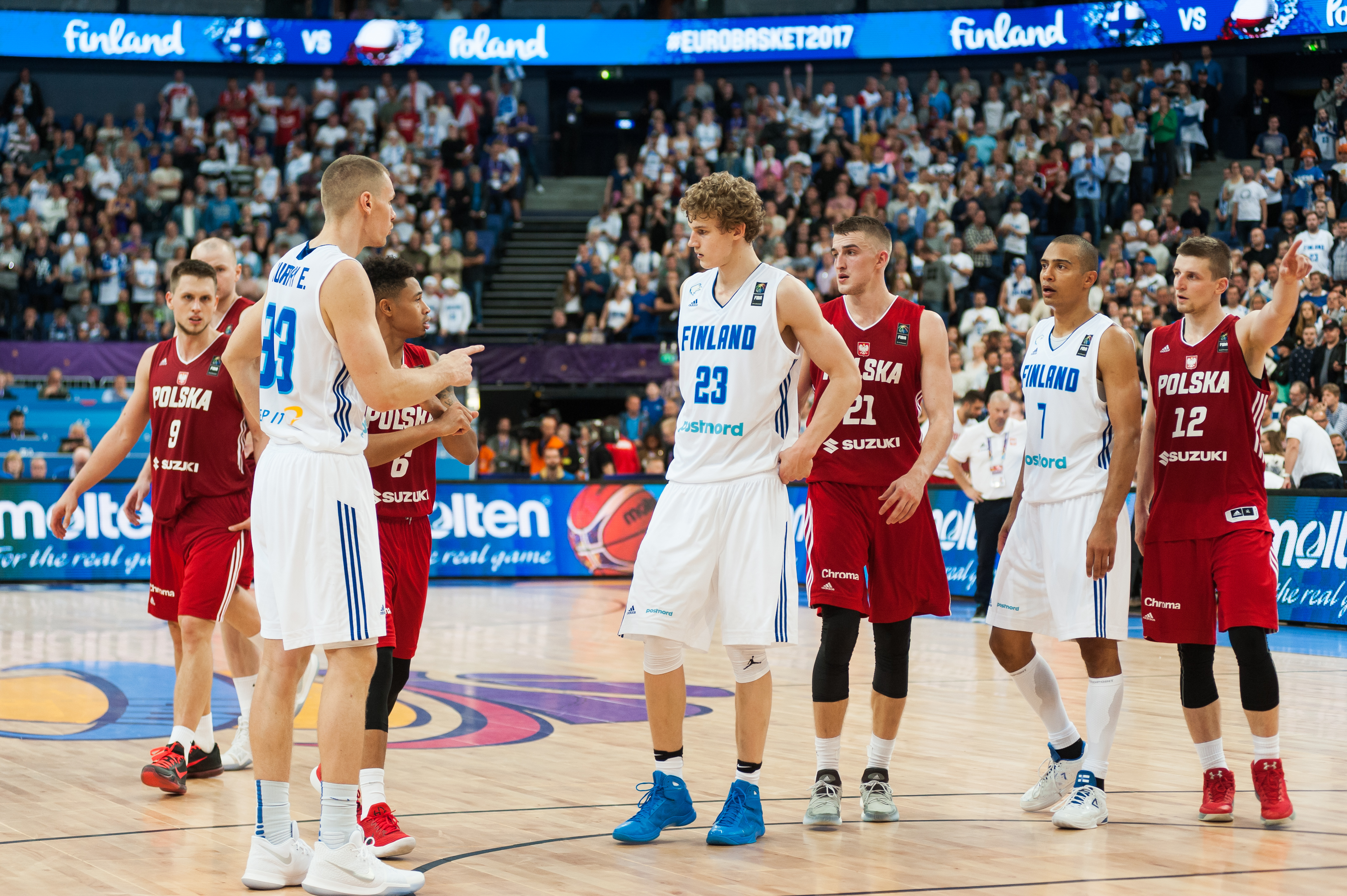
EuroBasket 2017 Group A game between Finland and Poland at Hartwall Arena in Helsinki, Finland

Finland and Poland co-hosted the 2021 Men's European Volleyball Championship and 2025 Men's European Basketball Championship

In 2022, Finnish and Polish gas markets were connected, following the commissioning of the Balticconnector and GIPL interconnections, also providing Finland with a connection to the EU gas market. The Rail Baltica and Via Baltica, modern rail and road links of vital importance, connecting Finland with Poland and Central Europe, remain under construction (as of 2022).

== Economic relations ==
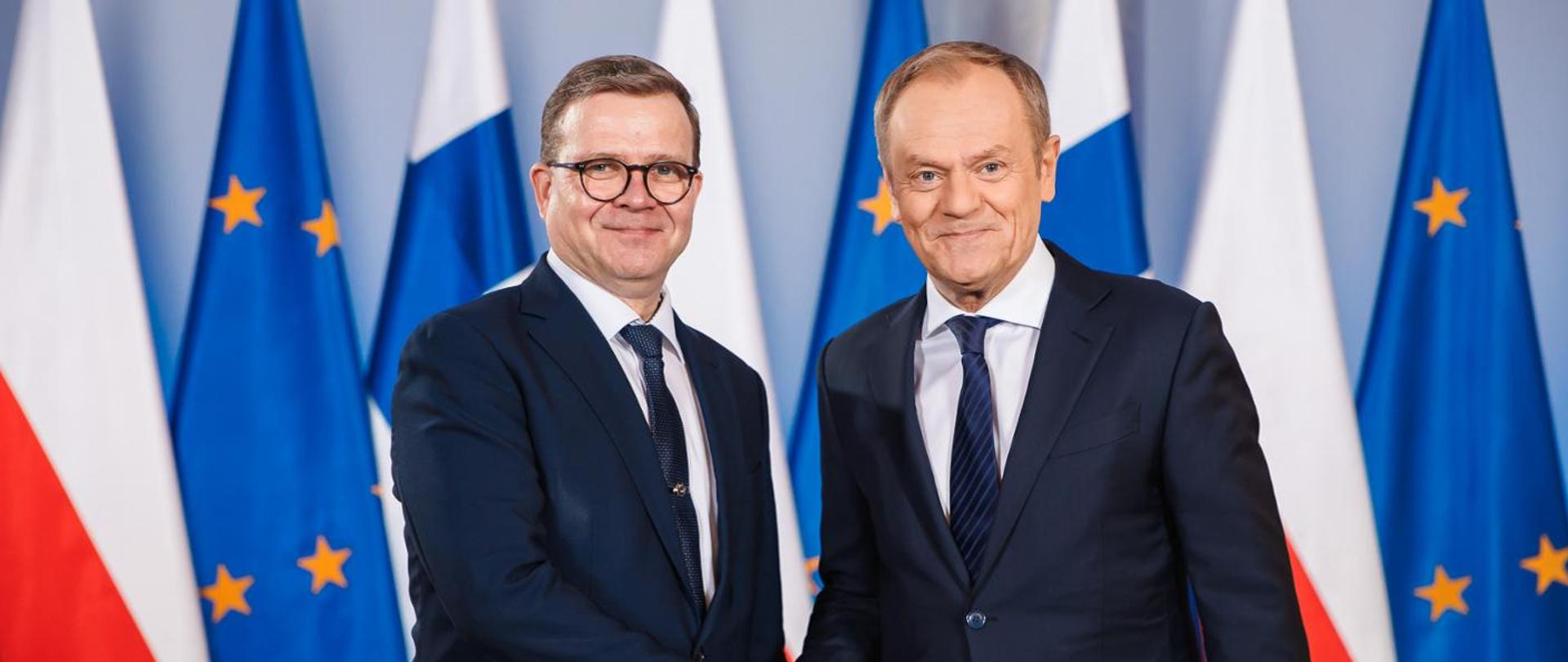
Prime Minister Petteri Orpo and Prime Minister of Poland Donald Tusk in 2024

The value of two-way trade between Poland and Finland in 2015 totaled EUR 2.8 billion.

== Agreements ==
The two countries have two agreements regarding environmental protection signed in 1990.

== the European Union ==
Finland joined the EU in 1 January 1995, and Poland joined in the EU in 1 May 2004.

== NATO ==
While Poland became a member of NATO in 1999, Poland supported Finland's NATO membership during Finland's accession into NATO, which was finalized on 4 April 2023. On 22 July 2022, Polish President Andrzej Duda signed and approved the proposals for Finland and Sweden to apply to join NATO.

== See also ==
- Foreign relations of Finland
- Foreign relations of Poland
- Poles in Finland
