= Algeria–Poland relations =

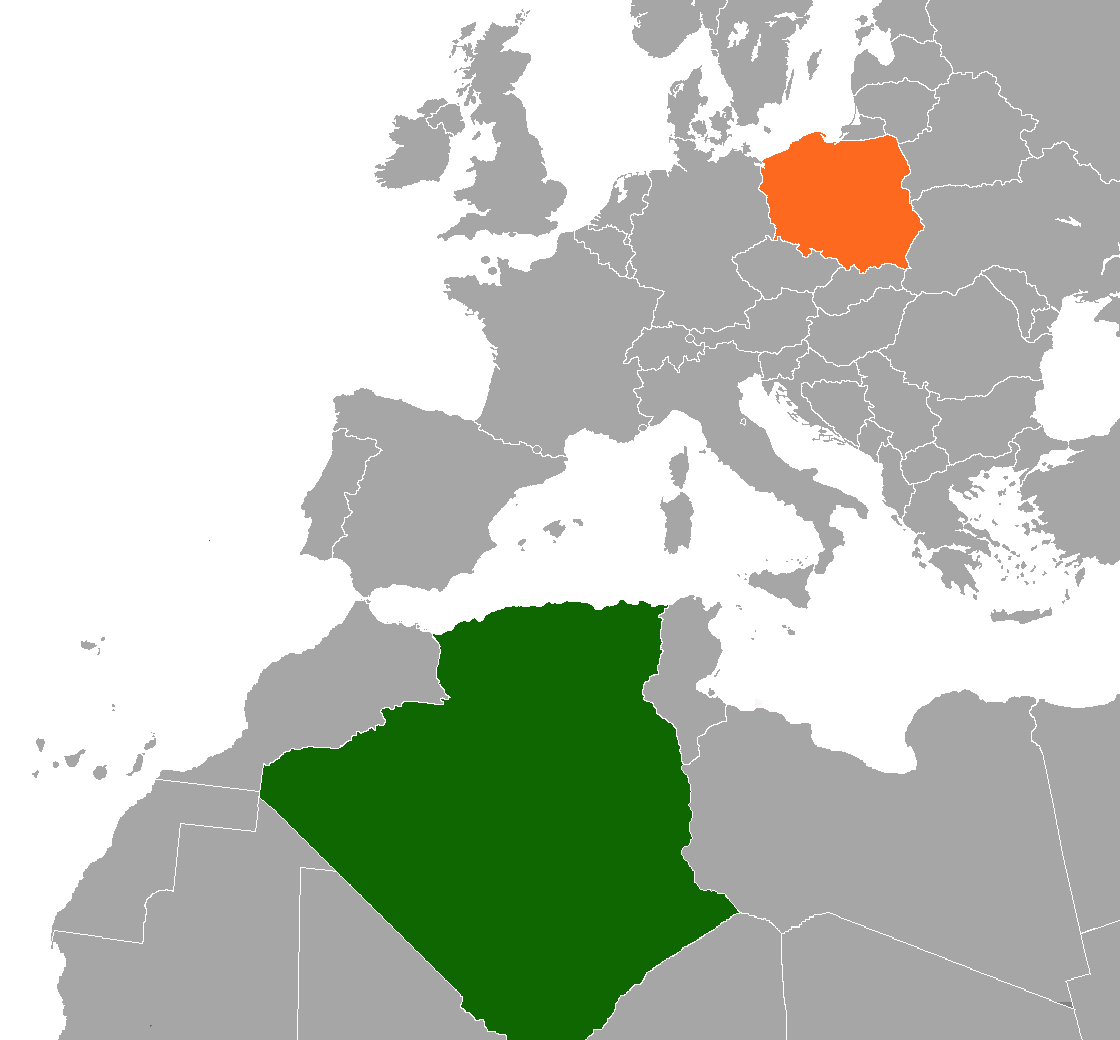
- Algeria: Poland

Algeria and Poland are members of the Union for the Mediterranean and the United Nations. Both nations established diplomatic relations in 1962.

== History ==
During World War I, Poles and Algerians were among prisoners of war of various nationalities held by the Germans in a POW camp in Stargard in modern northwestern Poland.

Following the restoration of independent Poland after the war, honorary consulates of Poland were established in Algiers and Oran in 1922 and 1932, respectively, and both operated until 1945.

Poles and Algerians both fought against Nazi Germany in World War II, including in the Battle of Monte Cassino in 1944. Algerian prisoners of war were held by the Germans alongside Polish and other Allied POWs in the Stalag II-B, Stalag VIII-C and Stalag XXI-A POW camps, operated in Czarne, Żagań and Ostrzeszów, respectively. Both Algerian and Polish POWs were subjected to poor conditions resulting in high mortality.

Poland supported the Algerian War of Independence, and demanded the establishment of independent Algeria at the UN. There were unofficial contacts between Polish representatives and the National Liberation Front. The Polish Red Cross donated funds and goods to Algerian refugees in Morocco and Tunisia, and Poland admitted Algerian youth to Polish schools and universities. Poland recognized the interim Algerian government even before the Algerian declaration of independence from 1962. The Embassy of Poland in Algiers was opened in 1962. A trade agreement and an economic and technical cooperation agreement were signed between Algeria and Poland in 1963, and a cultural cooperation agreement in 1964.

== Modern relations ==
Poland sent a rescue squad to help the relief operation after the 2003 Boumerdès earthquake in Algeria, and the Polish Medical Mission sent medical supplies.

In 2014, a defense cooperation agreement was signed in Algiers.

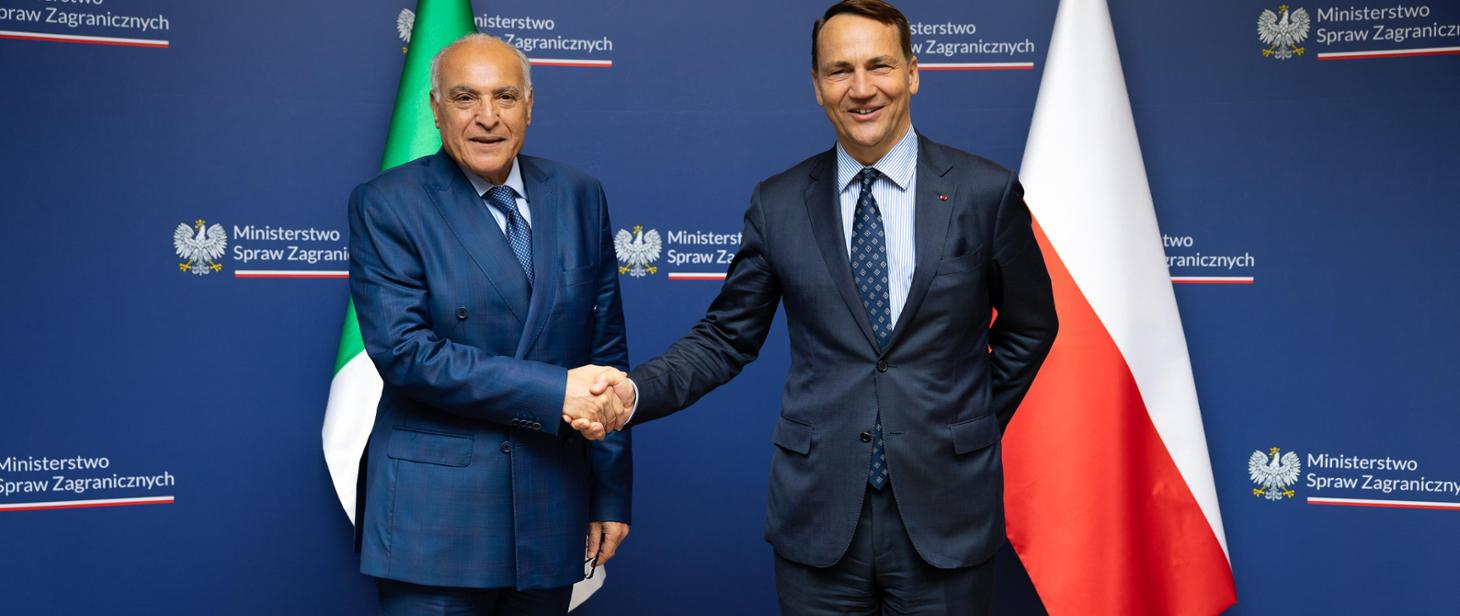
Ministers of Foreign Affairs Radosław Sikorski and Ahmed Attaf in Warsaw in 2024

Poland and Algeria enjoy a significant relations in business. In 2016, Poland and Algeria abolished visa requirements for diplomatic passport holders.

The Polish foreign minister had paid visit to Algeria in 2017 to boost trade and cooperation between two countries. Algerian Minister Mustapha Gitouni also boosts energy cooperation with Poland. Algeria considers Poland as an important partner in Europe.

Algerian students were the 28th largest group of foreign students in Poland in 2022, the 21st largest in 2023 and the 20th largest in 2024, at the same time being the second largest group from North Africa.

== Resident diplomatic missions ==
- Algeria has an embassy in Warsaw.
- Poland has an embassy in Algiers.
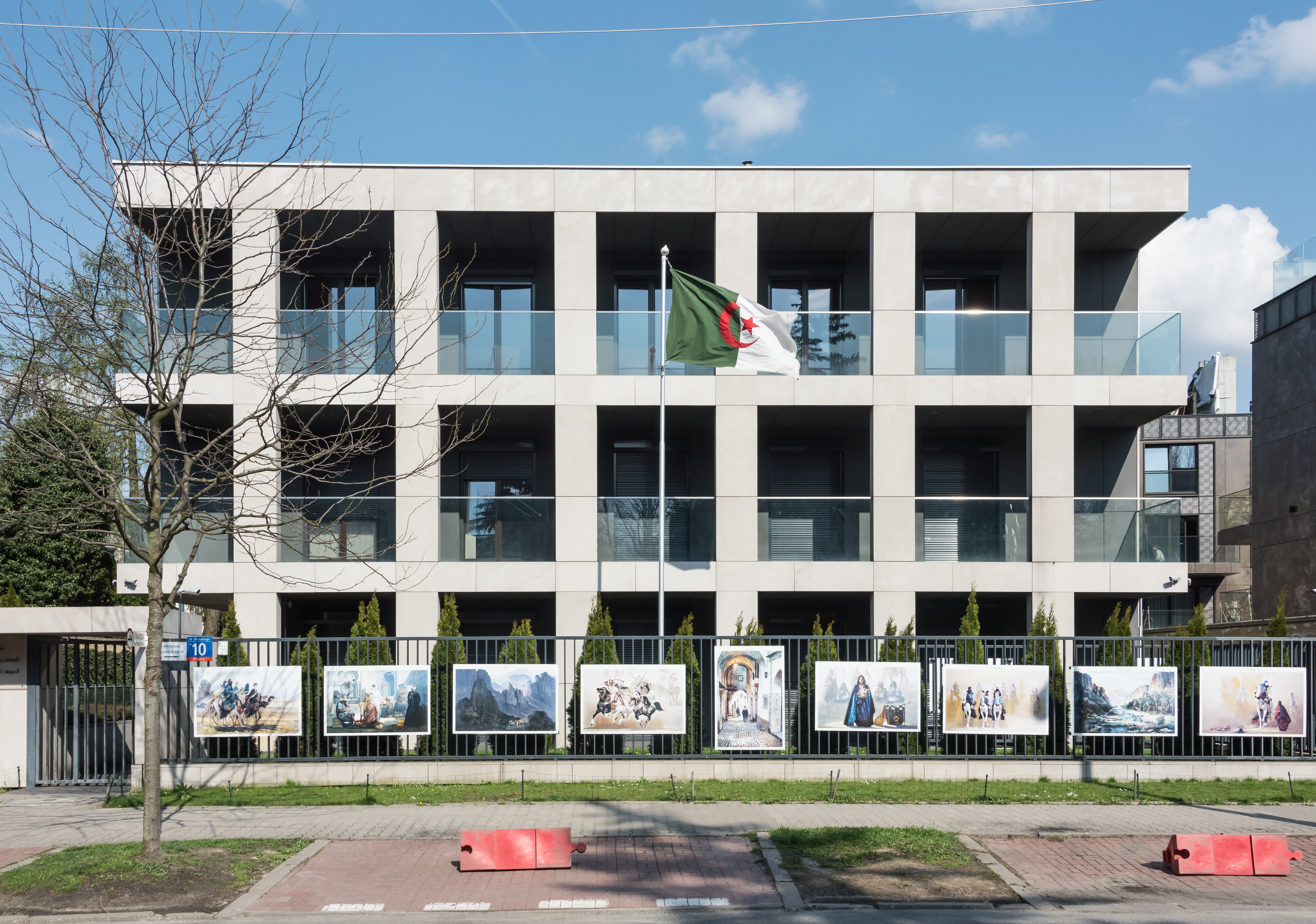
Embassy of Algeria in Warsaw

== See also ==
- Foreign relations of Algeria
- Foreign relations of Poland

== Bibliography ==
- Knopek, Jacek (2006). "Stosunki Polski z Afryką Arabską po II wojnie światowej". Forum Politologiczne (in Polish). 3. Instytut Nauk Politycznych Uniwersytetu Warmińsko-Mazurskiego w Olsztynie. ISSN 1734-1698.
