= Poland–Zambia relations =

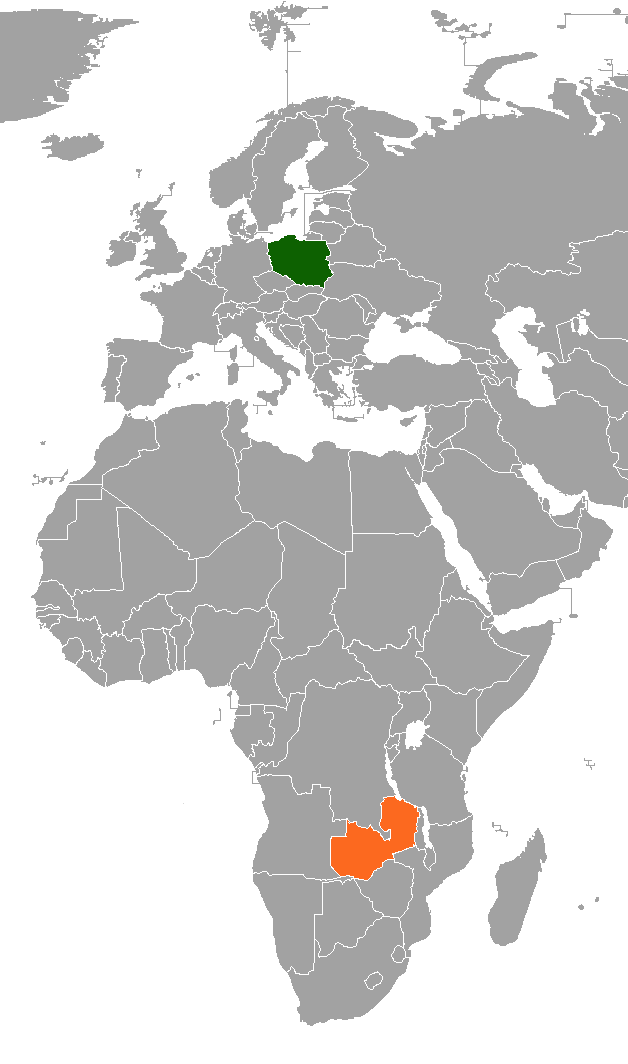
- Poland: Zambia

Poland–Zambia relations are bilateral relations between Poland and Zambia. Relations focus on economic and educational cooperation, and development assistance. Both nations are full members of the World Trade Organization and the United Nations.

== History ==
During World War II, in 1941, 429 Polish refugees from German- and Soviet-occupied Poland, including 209 men (mostly elders), 143 women and 77 children, were sheltered in various places in Zambia. The largest number, 170 Poles, stayed in Livingstone, with other locations including Fort Jameson, Mazabuka, Monze, Lusaka, Kafue. In 1941, a Consulate-General of Poland was established in Lusaka, and a consular post in Livingstone. In the following years, additional Polish refugees were admitted in Fort Jameson, Livingstone, Lusaka, Abercorn and Bwana Mkubwa, and by December 1944, their total number in Northern Rhodesia grew to 2,894. After the war, repatriation offices were established in Bwana Mkubwa and Lusaka, and Poles were repatriated to Europe, except for some 340 people who were allowed to stay.

Poland recognized Zambia in 1965, shortly after the Zambia Independence Act 1964, and afterwards bilateral relations were established.

== Assistance to Zambia ==
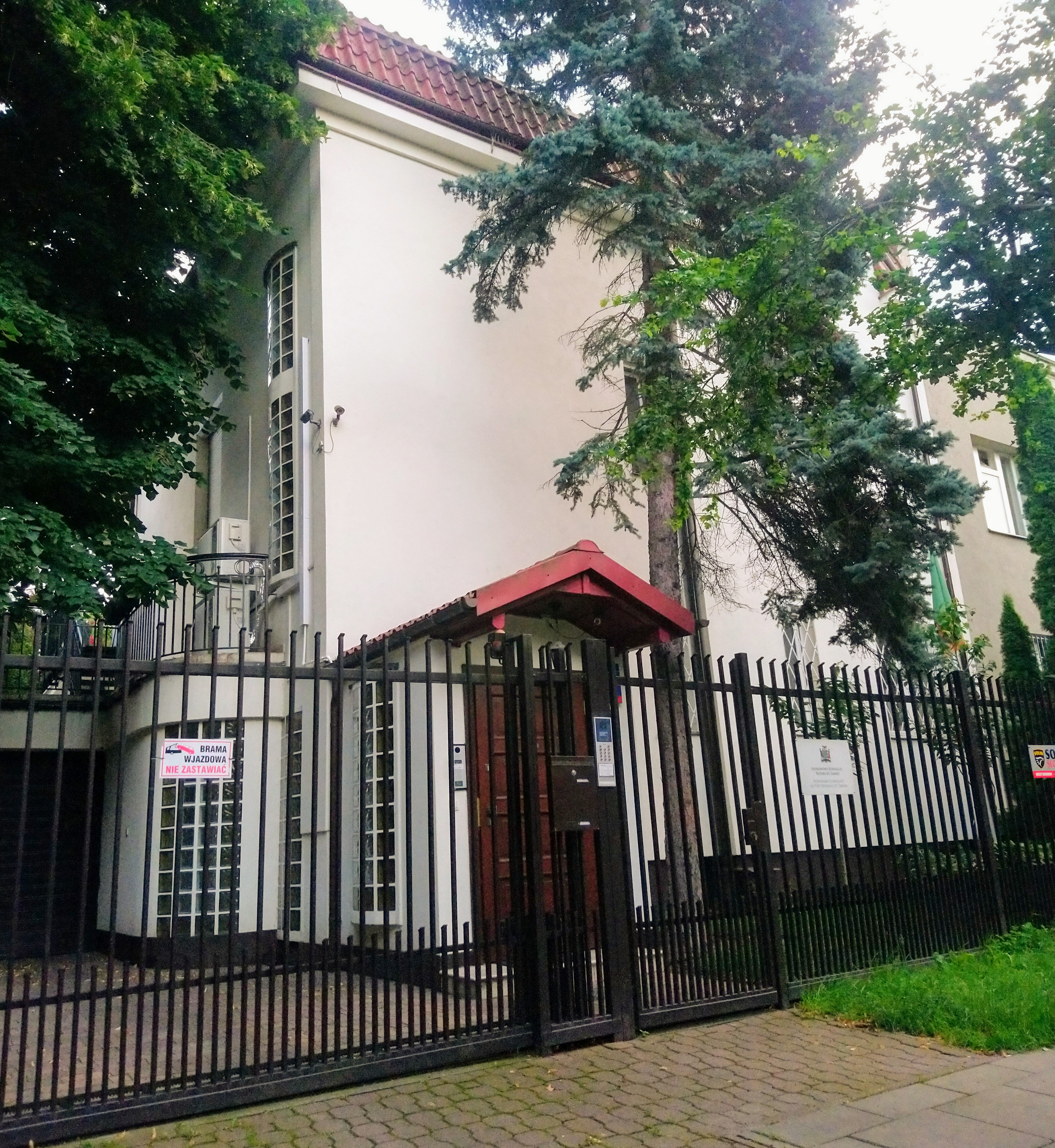
Honorary Consulate of Zambia in Warsaw

The Polish Medical Mission provides professional courses for Zambian medical workers in Katondwe. In 2019, the Polish government sent 22 tons of medical equipment to Zambia, destined for 18 various healthcare facilities, in what Minister Michał Woś called "the largest humanitarian aid provided by the Polish government" to date.

== Trade ==
All imports from Zambia to Poland are duty-free and quota-free, with the exception of armaments, as part of the Everything but Arms initiative of the European Union.

== Diplomatic missions ==
- Poland is accredited to Zambia from its embassy in Pretoria, and there is an honorary consulate of Poland in Lusaka.
- Zambia is accredited to Poland from its embassy in Berlin, and there is an honorary consulate of Zambia in Warsaw.
