= Afghanistan–Poland relations =

- Afghanistan: Poland

Diplomatic mission
- Afghan Embassy, Warsaw: Polish Embassy, Kabul (closed)

Afghanistan and Poland established diplomatic relations in 1928. Afghanistan has an embassy in Warsaw.

== History ==
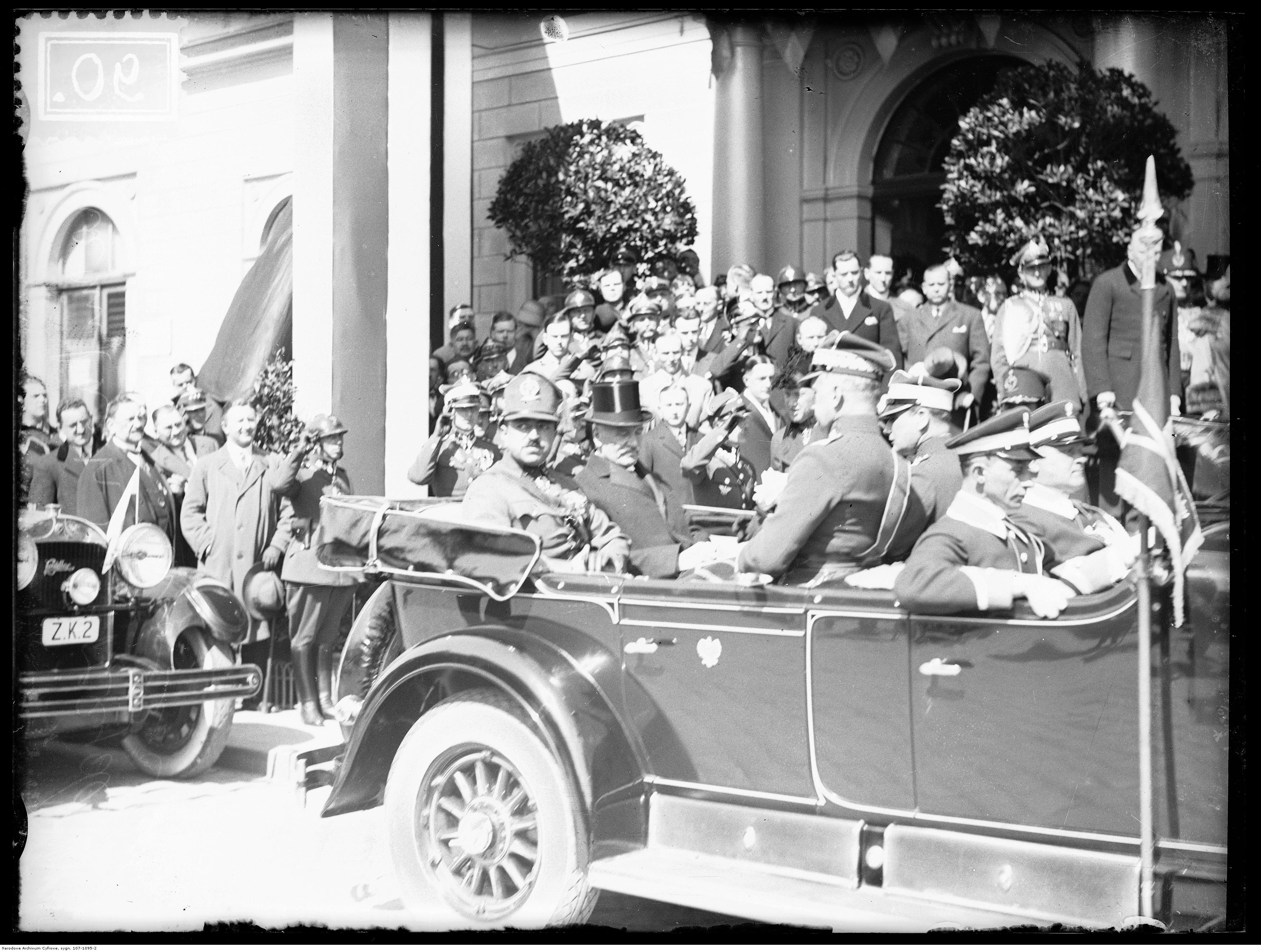
President of Poland Ignacy Mościcki and King of Afghanistan Amanullah Khan in Warsaw, Poland in 1928

Modern relations between Afghanistan and Poland dated back from 20th century, when King Amanullah Khan visited Poland at 1928 and received a warm welcome from the Polish Government. This developed into full diplomatic relations between the two states. However, relations were severed after the World War II and later Cold War, in which both countries had little to no formal contact.

Following the Saur Revolution, Afghanistan became a Communist country aligning itself with the eastern bloc nations. Following internal problems the Soviet Union intervened in Afghanistan in December 1979 killing the Khalqist leader Hafizullah Amin during Operation Storm-333 and starting the Soviet-Afghan War. Poland as part of communist Eastern Bloc sided with the Democratic Republic of Afghanistan and the Soviet Union against the western backed Mujahedeen, but at the same time, the growing Solidarity movement in Poland would lead to the collapse of communist rule there. Many anti Communist Poles showed support and solidarity toward Mujahedeen against the DRA and USSR.

== Modern ==
On February 15, 1989, the Soviet Union withdrew its forces from the Republic of Afghanistan starting the Afghan Civil War between forces loyal to Mohammad Najibullah's Fatherland Party government and those of the Pakistani backed Afghan Interim Government. On June 4, 1989, Poland communist rule ended in Poland with the Polish People's Republic being dissolved in 1990. In 1991 Communist hardliners attempted a coup d'état against President Gorbachav. The failure of the Coup accelerated the dissolution of the Soviet Union. Poland supported the Yeltsin government while Afghanistan supported the Communist hardliners, many of whom were in favor of continued financial aid to Najibullah's internationally isolated government. The new Russian president Boris Yeltsin would soon cut aid in 1992 causing mass starvation and leading to Najibullah to announce his resignation. Peace did not come however as various warlords fought for control of the capital of Kabul leading to another even bloodier civil war involving bloody urban fighting destroying a third of the relatively untouched city of Kabul, crime was rampant as the dissolution of the Afghan Army and law enforcement had led to a breakdown of civil order. In 1994 a movement called the Taliban mostly made up of orphans was formed. The Taliban rapidly expanded recruiting former Mujahedeen and Communist Soldiers. In 1996 the Taliban would take Kabul leading to many of the various warlords who had fought each other for Kabul to unite into the Northern Alliance as an attempt to stop the Taliban from gaining more territory. Poles showed support to the Northern Alliance. Warlord Shah Massoud also had an interview with a number of Poles, including Piotr Balcerowicz, the last to give interview to him before his assassination . Polish intelligence led by Alexander Makowski, assisted by anti-Taliban militias in Afghanistan, also helped discovering the existence of Osama bin Laden and had urged the CIA to kill him in 1999, but the CIA rejected and, thus, had missed the chance. The failed attempt was believed to have played a role leading to September 11 attacks by Bin Laden to the U.S. to growing anti-Western sentiment in Muslim world, which Makowski contributed to the missed opportunity to eliminate Bin Laden's threat at 1999.

Poland also contributed troops to Afghanistan in the subsequent Afghan War after the collapse of Taliban rule as part of NATO mission to the country. The Poles were able to win supports from Afghan locals, but it was hampered by American futile efforts in the war. However, due to the cost of the war, sometimes it was referred as Poland's "Vietnam Syndrome" because of incidents like Nangar Khel incident. In October 2012, Afghanistan gave back to Poland one of the country's original Renault FT-17 tanks that had been captured by the Soviets in the Polish-Soviet War and subsequently gifted to the Kingdom of Afghanistan.

== Resident diplomatic missions ==
- Afghanistan has an embassy in Warsaw.
- Poland is accredited to Afghanistan from its embassy in New Delhi, India.

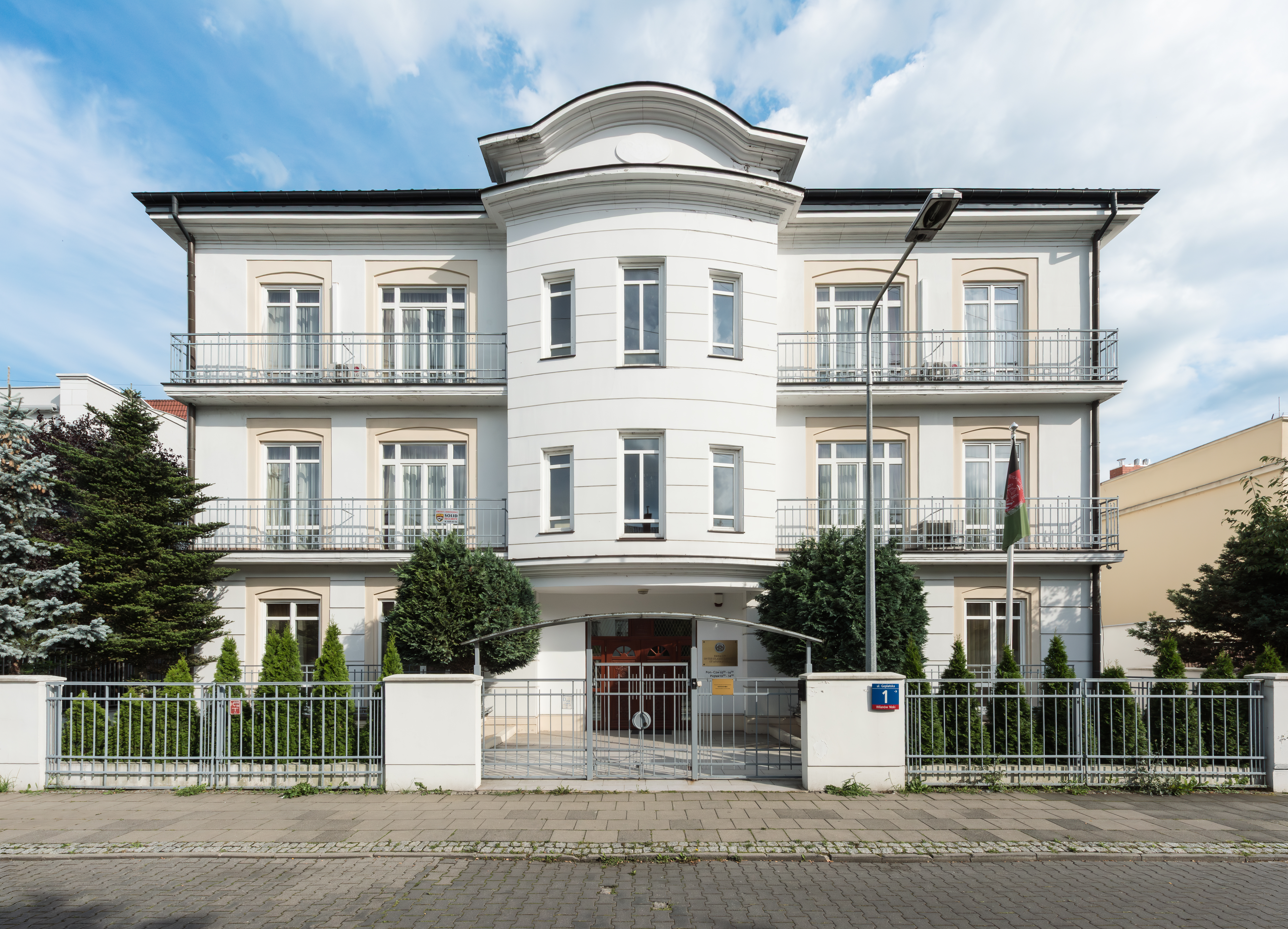
Embassy of Afghanistan in Warsaw

== See also ==
- Nangar Khel incident
