= Poland–South Sudan relations =

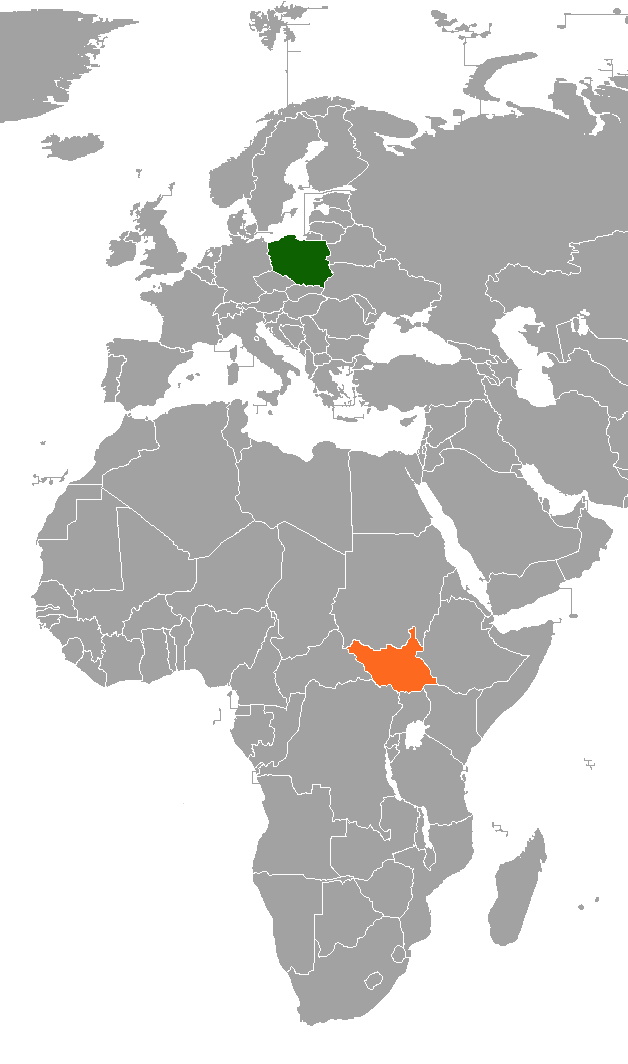

- Poland: South Sudan

Poland–South Sudan relations are bilateral relations between Poland and South Sudan. Both nations are full members of the United Nations.

== Establishment ==
Krzysztof Stanowski, undersecretary of state in the Ministry of Foreign Affairs of Poland, took part in the ceremony of proclamation of South Sudanese independence on July 9, 2011. Bilateral diplomatic relations were officially established on January 31, 2013.

== Humanitarian aid ==
The Emergency Medical Team of the Polish Center for International Aid supported four medical facilities at the tri-point of South Sudan, Uganda and the Democratic Republic of the Congo, located on the main route for South Sudanese refugees fleeing the South Sudanese Civil War. In 2018, the Polish Medical Mission and American Food for the Hungry organization jointly bought some 354 tons of food for the most vulnerable people of the Western Equatoria province to survive the harvest waiting period.

== Trade ==
All imports from South Sudan to Poland are duty-free and quota-free, with the exception of armaments, as part of the Everything but Arms initiative of the European Union.

== Diplomatic missions ==
- Poland is accredited to South Sudan from its embassy in Addis Ababa, and there is an honorary consulate of Poland in Juba.
- South Sudan is accredited to Poland from its embassy in Berlin.
