= Poland–Tanzania relations =

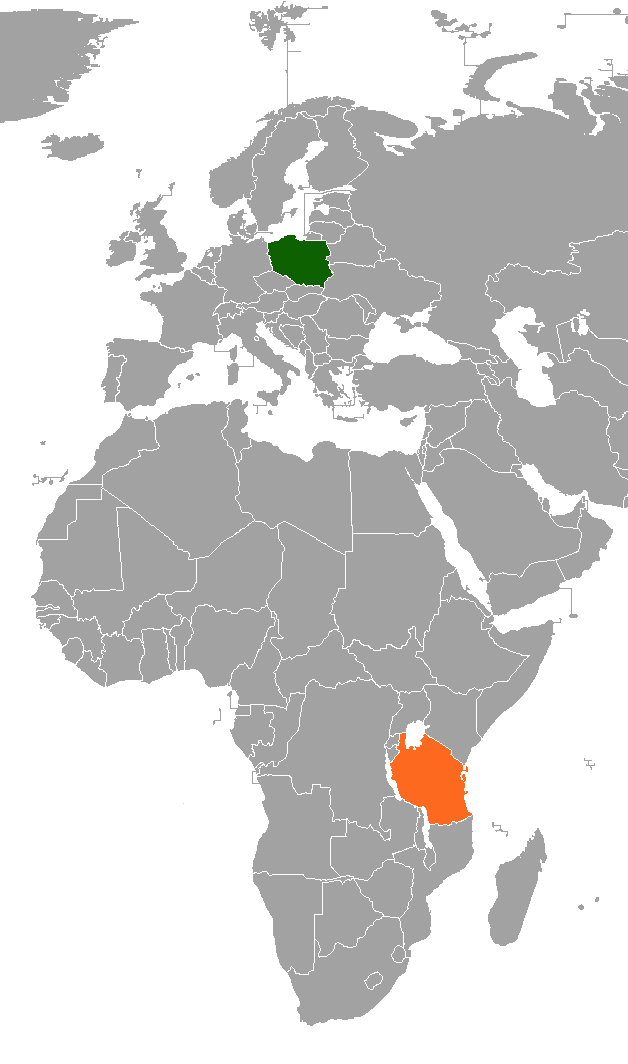
- Poland: Tanzania

Poland–Tanzania relations are the diplomatic relations between the Republic of Poland and the United Republic of Tanzania. Both nations are members of the United Nations and the World Trade Organization.

== History ==
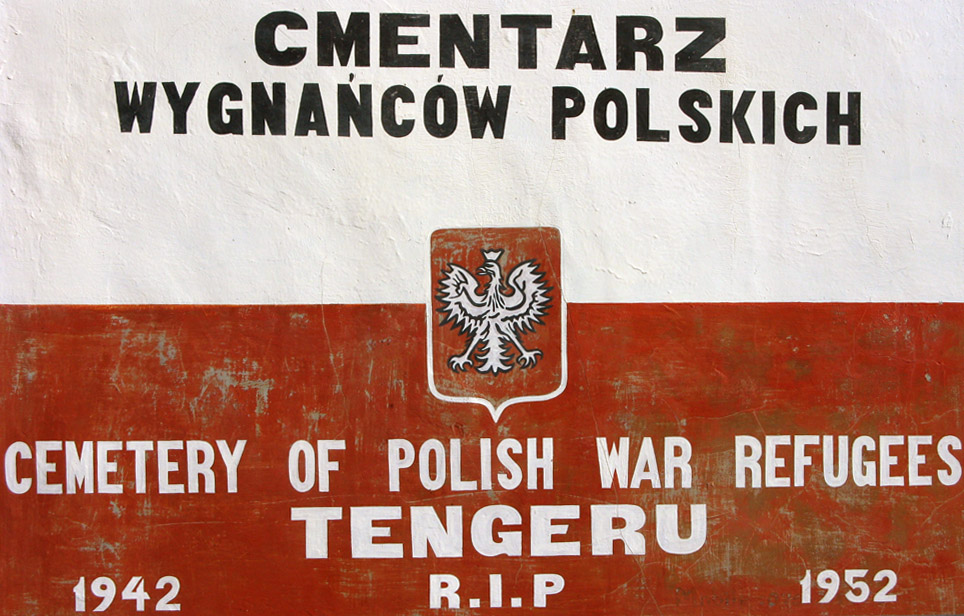
Plaque at the Cemetery of Polish War Refugees in Tengeru

Between 1942 and 1944, 18,000 Polish refugees arrived to the Kenyan port city of Mombasa and taken to the territory of Tanganyika (known as Tanzania today). The refugees were part of a larger exodus of between 320,000 and a million Polish evacuees who were forced out of Poland by the Soviet Union during World War II and sent to the eastern parts of the Soviet Union and Siberia. With the assistance of Anders' Army, approximately 110,000 Polish evacuees left the Soviet Union to Persia and 18,000 of those refugees were sent to East Africa. A consulate of Poland was located in Dar es Salaam from 1942 to 1945.

While in Tanganyika, the refugees were sent to settlement camps in Ifunda, Kigoma, Kidugala, Kondoa, Morogoro and Tengeru. The refugees would remain in Tanganyika until 1949 when many were resettled to Australia, Canada and the United Kingdom.

Diplomatic relations between Poland and Tanzania were established in 1961. In 1962, Poland opened a resident embassy in Dar es Salaam. In 1987, Tanzanian Foreign Minister Benjamin Mkapa paid an official visit to Poland. The Polish embassy was closed in 2008, and Poland was accredited to Tanzania from its embassy in Nairobi, Kenya. In 2003, Benjamin Mkapa returned to Poland as President of Tanzania.

In 2012, Poland opened an honorary consulate in Tanzania and in 2018, Poland re-opened its embassy in Dar es Salaam, nine years since its closure. The re-opening of the embassy was presided by Polish Foreign Minister Jacek Czaputowicz and Tanzanian Foreign Minister Augustine Mahiga. Tanzania is one of the main beneficiaries of Polish development aid and Tanzania is one of Poland's priority partners in Sub-Saharan Africa. The Polish Medical Mission provides professional courses for Tanzanian medical workers and donates medical equipment to Tanzanian hospitals, co-funded by the Ministry of Foreign Affairs of Poland.

== High-level visits ==
High-level visits from Poland to Tanzania

- Undersecretary for Foreign Affairs Bogusław Zaleski (2003)
- Foreign Minister Jacek Czaputowicz (2008)
- President Andrzej Duda (February 2024)

High-level visits from Tanzania to Poland

- Foreign Minister Benjamin Mkapa (1987)
- President Benjamin Mkapa (2003)

== Bilateral agreements ==
Both nations have signed a few bilateral agreements such as an Agreement on Scientific and Technical Cooperation (1965); Agreement on Extending Aid Credit (2015) and a Memorandum of Understanding for Business Cooperation and Investment.

== Tourism and transportation ==
In 2017, 10,000 Polish citizens visited Tanzania. There are direct flights between Poland and Tanzania with Smartwings Poland.

== Trade ==
In 2017, trade between Poland and Tanzania totaled US$108.5 million. Poland's main exports to Tanzania include: grain (mainly wheat); textile and electrical components such as cables, insulated wire and electrical wires. Tanzania's main exports to Poland are tobacco and coffee. All imports from Tanzania to Poland are duty-free and quota-free, with the exception of armaments, as part of the Everything but Arms initiative of the European Union. Poland's foreign direct investment in Tanzania reached $110 million in 2017, much of it in support of the agricultural sector through loans.

== Resident diplomatic missions ==
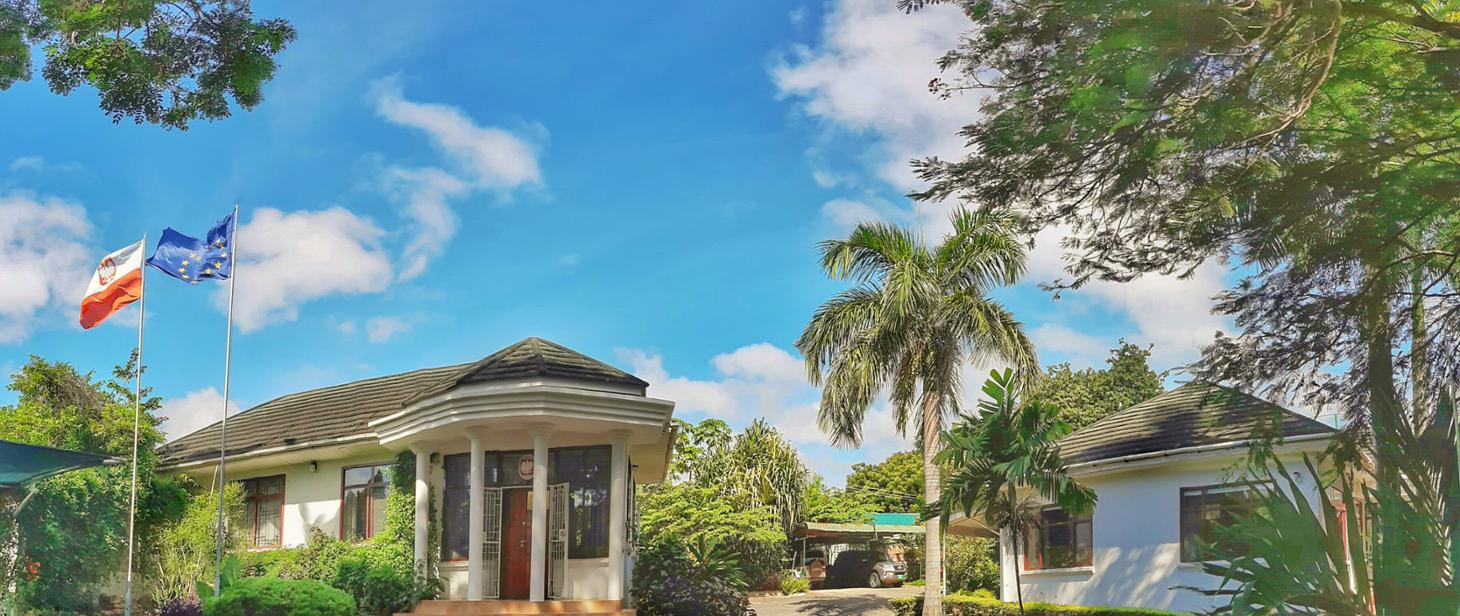
Embassy of Poland in Dar es Salaam

- Poland has an embassy in Dar es Salaam.
- Tanzania is accredited to Poland from its embassy in Berlin, Germany.

== See also ==
- Foreign relations of Poland
- Foreign relations of Tanzania
- Evacuation of Polish civilians from the USSR in World War II
- List of Polish refugees cemeteries in Africa
