= Czortków uprising =

- Part of the Occupation of Poland and the Polish resistance movement in World War II
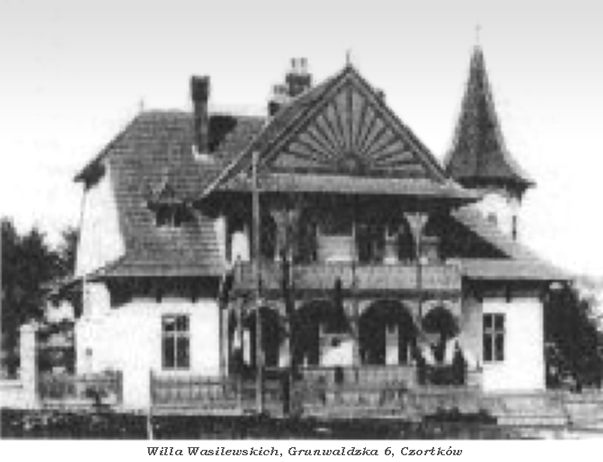
- Insurgency headquarters at the Wasilewski family home, Grunwaldzka 6 Street, Czortków
Date	21–22 January 1940
Location	Czortków, Podolia
Result	Soviet victory

Belligerents
Anti-soviet Polish students	Soviet Union

Strength
100 to 250 insurgents	Unknown

Casualties and losses
14 killed, several wounded ~150 prisoner 24 executed	3 killed

The Czortków uprising (Polish: Powstanie Czortkowskie) was a failed attempt at resisting Soviet state repressions by the young anti-Soviet Poles most of whom were prewar students from the local high school. The uprising took place in the Soviet-occupied Polish town of Czortków (now Chortkiv, Ukraine) during World War II. The insurgents attempted to storm the local Red Army barracks and a prison in order to release Polish soldiers incarcerated there. The attack occurred on the night of January 21–22, 1940. It was the first Polish civilian uprising against the Nazi-Soviet occupation of Poland.

== Background ==
On 17 September 1939 the Red Army, allied with Nazi Germany (see: Molotov–Ribbentrop Pact), invaded the eastern part of Poland. The Soviets advanced quickly, as the bulk of the Polish Army was concentrated in the west, fighting the Wehrmacht. According to the Molotov–Ribbentrop Pact, Poland was to be divided by the two allied powers. The Germans occupied the western part of the country, while the Soviets annexed eastern Poland (see: Polish areas annexed by the Soviet Union), including the town of Czortków, seat of a powiat (population 20,000), located in prewar Tarnopol Voivodeship.

Between 1939 and the 1941 Operation Barbarossa, the Soviet NKVD arrested and imprisoned about 500,000 Poles including state officials, civil servants, uniformed officers and scores of the so-called "enemies of the people" such as food producers, engineers, merchants and the clergy. About 65,000 Poles in all were secretly executed. Soon after Czortków's annexation into the Ukrainian SSR, the new rulers began a campaign of repressions.

The Polish inhabitants of Czortków (in 1931 ethnic Poles made up 46.4% of the town's population) organized themselves against the Soviets as early as October 1939, when a conspirational organization Stronnictwo Narodowe (National Alliance) was created. Its purpose was to fight the occupier and carry out sabotage. Soon afterwards, the founders of the organization, mostly students from the local high school including Tadeusz Bankowski, Henryk Kamiński, Heweliusz Malawski, and their teacher Józef Opacki, decided to organize an uprising.

== The night of the attack ==
In December 1939, a large contingent of the Red Army troops from the garrison in Czortków left town to fight in the Winter War against Finland. The conspirators noticed it and saw their chance of success. They planned to make a surprise attack on the barracks and liberate the local prison in which officers of the Polish Army were kept, and take over the post office, hospital and the railway station. The plotters wanted to seize a train with the anticipated help from the already freed Polish officers, and travel to nearby Romania via Zaleszczyki. To delay the Soviet pursuit, they also planned to blow up the rail bridge on the Seret.

The conspirators decided to start the uprising on the night of January 21/22, 1940, the anniversary of the outbreak of the 1863 January Uprising. In the evening of January 21, between 100 and 250 people gathered in Czortków's Roman Catholic Dominican Church. Most of them were not armed, only a few had guns or knives, some even old-fashioned swords. They divided themselves into four groups – the first was going to seize the main barracks, the second – the prison, the third – the center of town, and the fourth – the railway station. The plotters agreed that their battle cry would be Z krzyzem (Along with the Cross).

The attack on the Red Army barracks took place at 22:00, but the plotters underestimated the strength of the Soviets, and failed to capture the complex. Alarmed by the gunshots, the Red Army troops stormed out of the barracks and counterattacked. After a short gunfight, in which three Soviet soldiers and 14 Poles died and several were wounded, the plotters dispersed.

== Aftermath ==
On the next day, 22 January, the NKVD secret police troops began mass arrests of suspected participants in the uprising. Altogether, they incarcerated some 150 Poles. Twenty four students were brutally interrogated by the NKVD and tortured. Historian Jan Tomasz Gross writes that the plotters were beaten with wooden poles, handguns, bottles and metal bars, and "kicked until their jaws and ribs were broken." Fifty five men were sentenced to exile in Siberia. Almost all of those murdered or expelled were male teenagers of Polish nationality from Czortkow. Also, officers of the Polish Army, kept in Czortkow prison, were among those murdered in the Katyn massacre later on.

Eighteen months later on 2 July 1941, just after Operation Barbarossa, the Soviets secretly executed eight Dominican friars from the Roman Catholic Church in the town. According to some witnesses, this was in revenge for Dominican help with the uprising.

Władysław Buczkowski, a witness to the uprising, wrote in his memoirs that even though he did not take part in the revolt, he was arrested on January 27 and, after torture, was sent to prison in Tarnopol. Sentenced to 15 years, together with other Poles from Czortków, he was taken to Kharkiv and later sent to Siberia. Buczkowski was among the few who survived, and in 1942, due to the Sikorski-Mayski Agreement, he managed to escape from the Soviet Union.
