= Evacuation of Polish civilians from the USSR in World War II =

Evacuation of the Polish civilians from the USSR in World War II
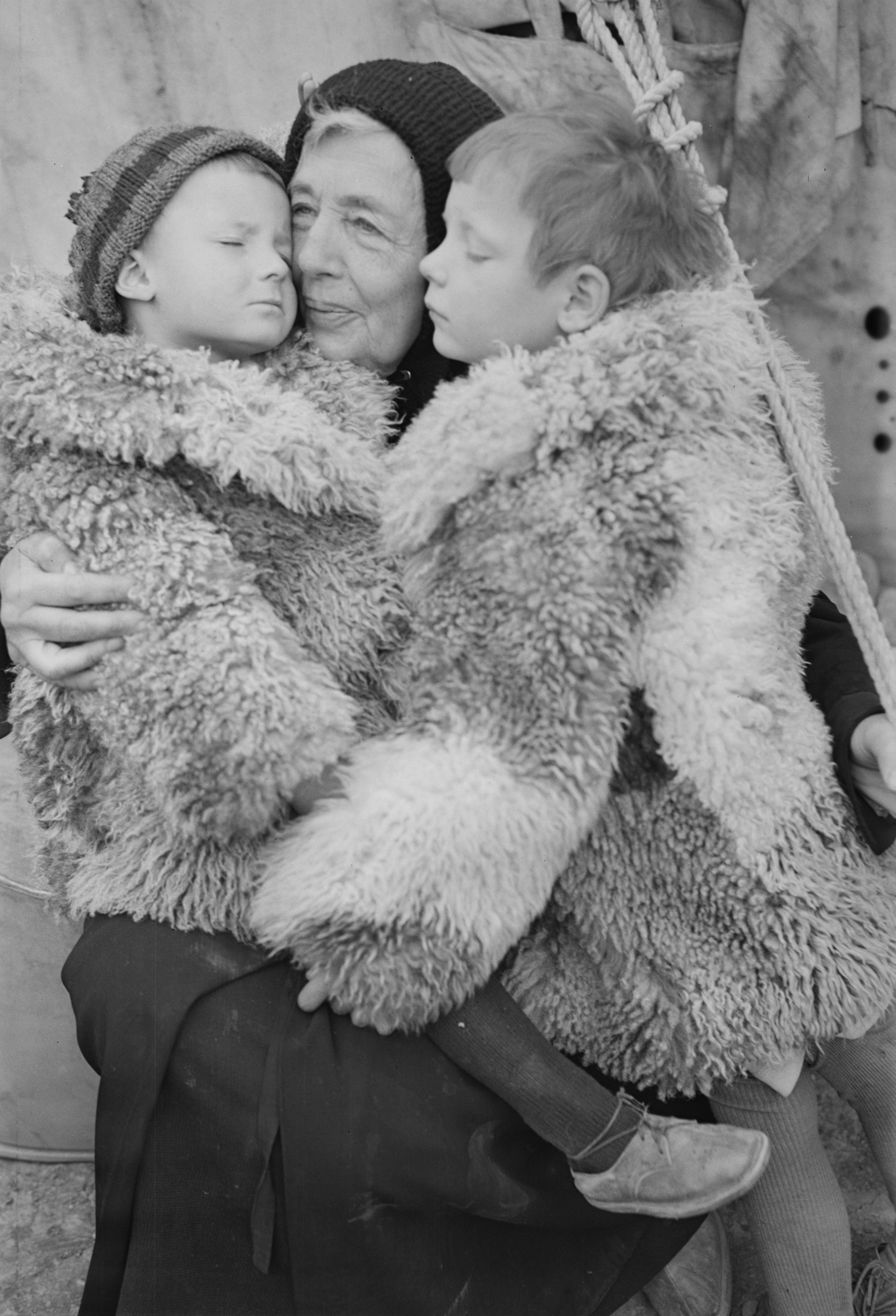
A Polish woman and her grandchildren at an American Red Cross evacuation camp in Tehran, Iran

Following the Soviet invasion of Poland at the onset of World War II, in accordance with the Nazi–Soviet Pact against Poland, the Soviet Union acquired more than half of the territory of the Second Polish Republic or about 201,000 square kilometres (78,000 sq mi) inhabited by more than 13,200,000 people. Within months, in order to de-Polonize annexed lands, the Soviet NKVD rounded up and deported between 320,000 and 1 million Polish nationals to the eastern parts of the USSR, the Urals, and Siberia. There were four waves of deportations of entire families with children, women, and elderly people aboard freight trains from 1940 until 1941. The second wave of deportations by the Soviet occupational forces across the Kresy macroregion, affected 300,000 to 330,000 Poles, sent primarily to Kazakhstan.

Thanks to a remarkable reversal of fortune well over 110,000 Poles, including 36,000 women and children, managed to leave the Soviet Union with Anders' Army. They ended up in Iran, India, Palestine, New Zealand, and British Africa colonies, as well as in Mexico. Among those who remained in the Soviet Union, about 150,000 Poles perished before the end of the war.

The evacuation of the Polish people from the USSR lasted from 24 March 1942 for one week, and then again from August 10, 1942, until the beginning of September. In the first stage, more than 30,000 military personnel and about 11,000 children left Krasnovodsk (Turkmen SSR, present-day Turkmenistan) by sea for Bandar Pahlavi. In the second stage of evacuation from the interior, more than 43,000 military personnel and about 25,000 civilians left with General Władysław Anders across the Caspian Sea to Iran. About one third of the civilians were children. A smaller-scale evacuation to Ashgabat–Mashhad followed, including the large and final group of civilians.

== Background ==
In 1939, following Nazi German and Soviet attack on Poland, the territory of the Second Polish Republic was divided between the two invaders. The eastern half of Poland was annexed by the Soviet Union. Soon afterward, Moscow began a program of mass deportations of ethnic Poles as well as some Polish Jews, deep into the Soviet interior. Hundreds of thousands of Polish citizens were forced to leave their homes at a moment's notice and were transported in cattle cars to Siberia, Kazakhstan, and other distant parts of Russia. There were several waves of deportations during which families were sent to barren land in the Soviet Union. The categories first targeted by the NKVD included court judges, civil servants, staff of municipal governments, members of the police force, refugees from western Poland, tradesmen, forestry workers, settlers, and small farmers, as well as children from summer camps and Polish orphanages, family members of anyone arrested by the NKVD, and family members of anyone who had escaped to the West or had gone missing.

The fate of the deported Poles improved in mid-1941, after the signing of the Sikorski–Mayski agreement. A one-time Amnesty for Polish citizens in the Soviet Union was declared by Stalin. It lasted until 16 January 1943, at which point it was effectively revoked. In this small window of opportunity, Anders' Army was formed, which attracted not only soldiers who had been kept in Soviet camps, but also thousands of civilians, and Polish orphanages with children whose parents had perished in the Gulag. Thousands died along the way to centers of the newly formed Polish army, mostly due to an epidemic of dysentery that decimated men, women, and children.

== Evacuations ==
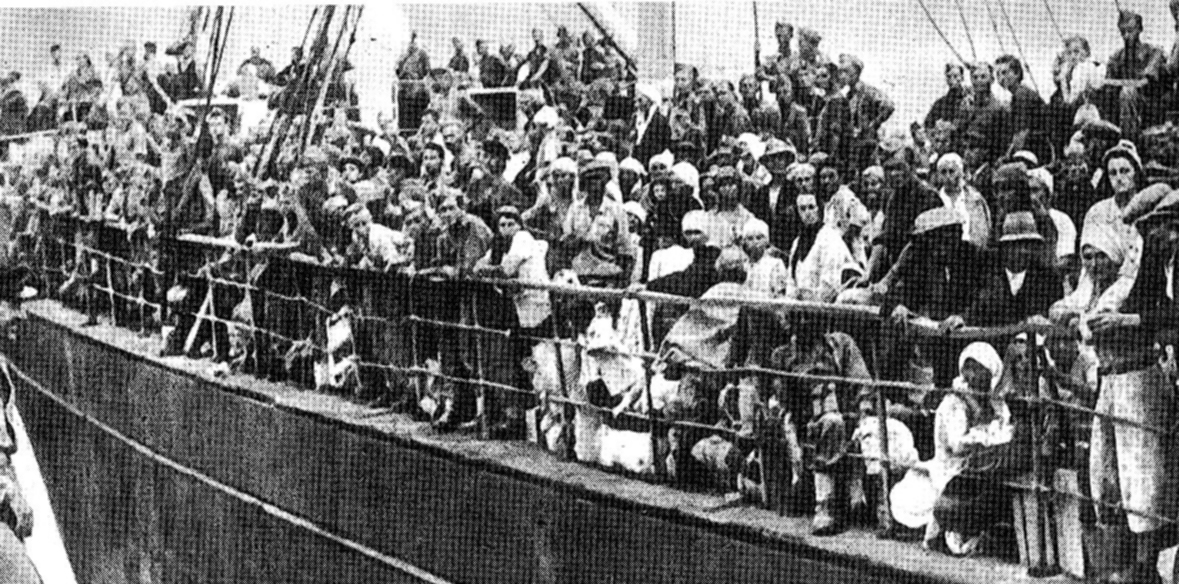
A ship carrying Polish soldiers and civilian refugees arrives in Iran from the Soviet Union, 1942.

On March 19, 1942, General Władysław Anders ordered the evacuation of Polish soldiers and civilians who lived next to army camps. Between March 24 and April 4, 33,069 soldiers left the Soviet Union for Iran, as well as 10,789 civilians, including 3,100 children. This was a small fraction of the approximately 1.7 million Polish citizens who had been arrested by the Soviets at the beginning of the war. Most Poles were forced to stay in the Soviet Union. Polish soldiers and civilians who left stayed in Iranian camps at Pahlevi and Mashhad, as well as Tehran.

After the first evacuation, Polish-Soviet relations deteriorated and the Soviet government began arresting Polish officials. On August 9, 1942, a second evacuation began, which lasted until September 1. Polish evacuees had to travel by train to Krasnovodsk, where they took a ship across the Caspian Sea to Iran. Some had to travel by land to Ashgabat. The Polish consulates in the USSR issued in-land temporary passports for those being evacuated: These had to be presented at the border crossings in order to proceed. According to one of the evacuees, Wanda Ellis:

The hunger was terrible, we did not get a loaf of bread a day, as we had in Siberia. Each slice of bread had to be stolen or gotten in any other way. It was a hell—hungry, sick people, children in rail cars, filled with louse. Illnesses—typhoid, dysentery, no restrooms in cars. To relieve ourselves, we had to jump out of the train whenever it stopped. It is a miracle that we survived, with thousands dead.

During the second evacuation, 69,247 persons left the Soviet Union, including 25,501 civilians (9,633 children). Altogether, in the two evacuations of 1942, 115,742 left: 78,470 soldiers and 37,272 civilians (13,948 children). Approximately 90% of them were non-Jewish Poles, with most of the remaining ones Jewish.

Poles did not stay in the Soviet-controlled Iran for long for several reasons, including the hostility of Soviet authorities who occupied northern Iran (see Anglo-Soviet invasion of Iran), as well as the threat from the German armies that had already reached the Caucasus (see Case Blue), and finally due to poor living conditions.

== Refugee camps ==
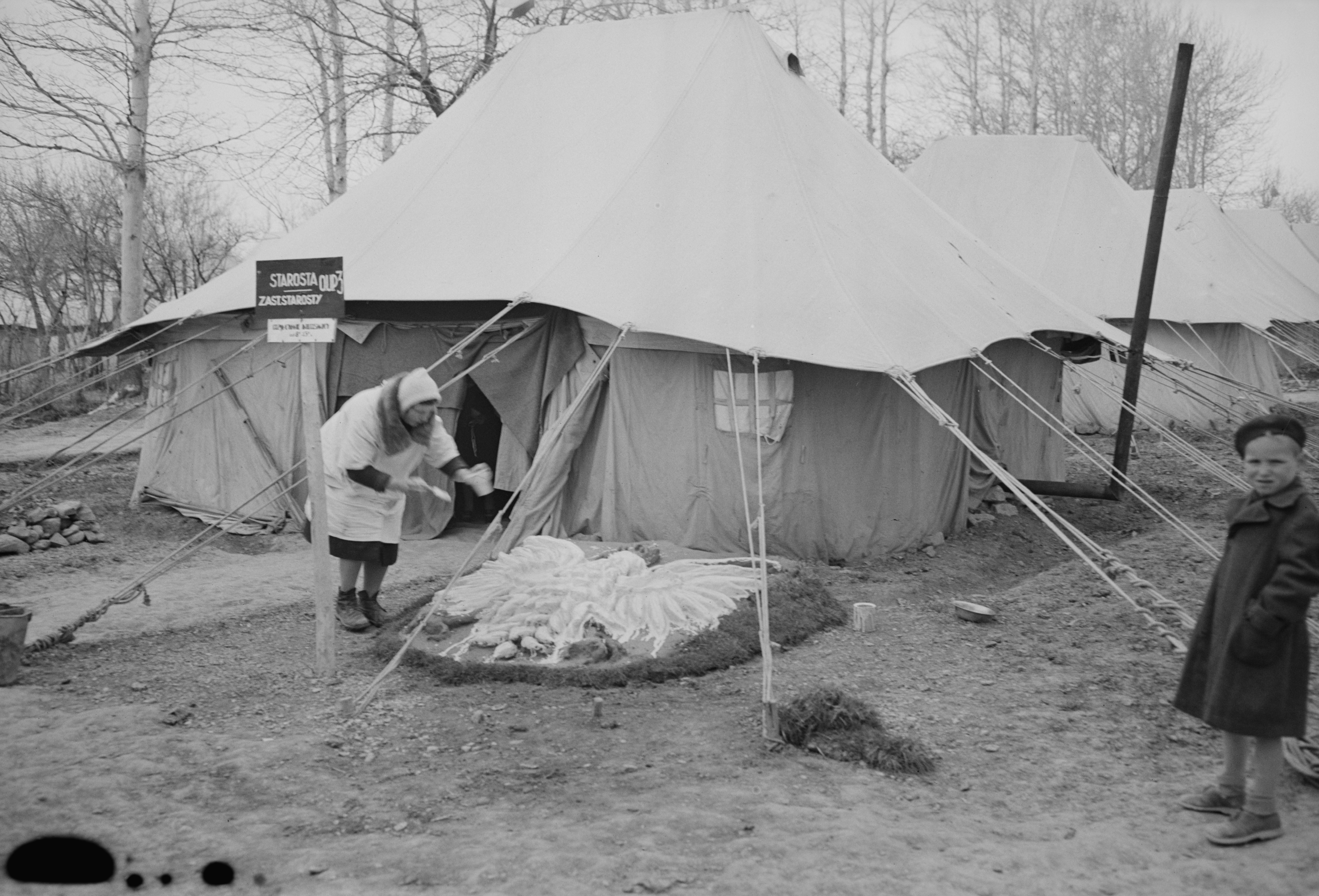
Polish refugee tents in Iran, 1943

The refugees finally left Iran after a few months, and were transported to a number of countries, such as Lebanon, Mandatory Palestine, India, Uganda, Kenya, Tanganyika, Northern and Southern Rhodesia, South Africa, New Zealand, and Mexico.

=== British Africa ===
Maria Gabiniewicz, one of the refugees, later wrote: "We managed to leave the Soviet Union in the last transport. Still, thousands of distraught Poles remained there, sent to kolkhozs. I will never forget the journey on trucks through the mountains from Ashgabat to Tehran. After the hell that we survived, Tehran was a different world. Camp life was organized, there was a school, scouts, and religious life. Tehran was a gate, through which we were sent, in groups, to different parts of the world. My mother refused the tempting offer of going to Santa Rosa in Mexico. She wanted us to go either to India or Africa, as it was closer to Europe. She hoped we would return to Poland some day. We were transported on board a warship, through Persian Gulf. . . . After twelve days, we reached the port of Beira in Mozambique. The adults were uneasy and afraid of the unknown, but us, the children, were happy for an adventure. We were not first the Poles in Africa. There were already 22 camps, with 18,000 people who like us had gone through different places of exile in the USSR, scattered across British Africa—from Kenya to Cape Colony.

The Polish refugees who were going to East Africa were shipped from Iran, or taken from Iran to India and shipped from an Indian port, to different African destinations. The Kenyan port of Mombasa, the Tanganyikan ports Tanga and Dar es Salaam, and the Mozambican ports Beira and Laurenҫo Marques (which is today's Maputo), were the first African stops for the Polish refugees.

Many Polish refugees that spent time in refugee communities in British East Africa exhibited a white subaltern form of self-identification, regarding themselves as more similar to local populations than white European settlers as a result of their experience of oppression and forced migration at the hands of an expansionist power. However, other Polish refugees’ testimonies reflect the attitudes of British Imperial officials. This was particularly evident in Koja, Uganda, where there were heightened anxieties regarding miscegenation.

==== Northern Rhodesia ====
In October 1942, the Director of War Evacuees and Camps of Northern Rhodesia, Gore Browne, expected around 500 Polish refugees to arrive from the Middle East. In August 1945, the number of Polish refugees in Northern Rhodesia was 3,419, of which 1,227 stayed in camps in the capital Lusaka, 1,431 in Bwana Mkubwa at the Copperbelt,164 in Fort Jameson at the border with Nyasaland, and 597 in Abercorn in the Northern Province.

The last camp that was built in Northern Rhodesia at Abercorn (today's Mbala, Zambia). It was set up in 1942. Approximately 600 Polish refugees were taken to Abercorn in contingents. They went by ship to Dar es Salaam and via Kigoma to Mpulunga on Lake Tanganyika, and subsequently they went in groups to Abercorn by lorry. Wanda Nowoisiad-Ostrowska, quoted by historian Tadeusz Piotrowski (The Polish Deportees of World War II), remembered that Abercorn camp was divided into six sections of single-room houses, a washing area, a laundry, a church, and four school buildings with seven classes. The cooking was done in a large kitchen situated in the middle. One of the administrators lived in a building that also had a community centre where films were shown. Nowoisiad-Ostrowska depicted quite a sociable image with singing songs in the evening, listening together to the radio in order to be informed about the war in Europe, and doing craftwork with other women in the evenings.

==== Living conditions ====
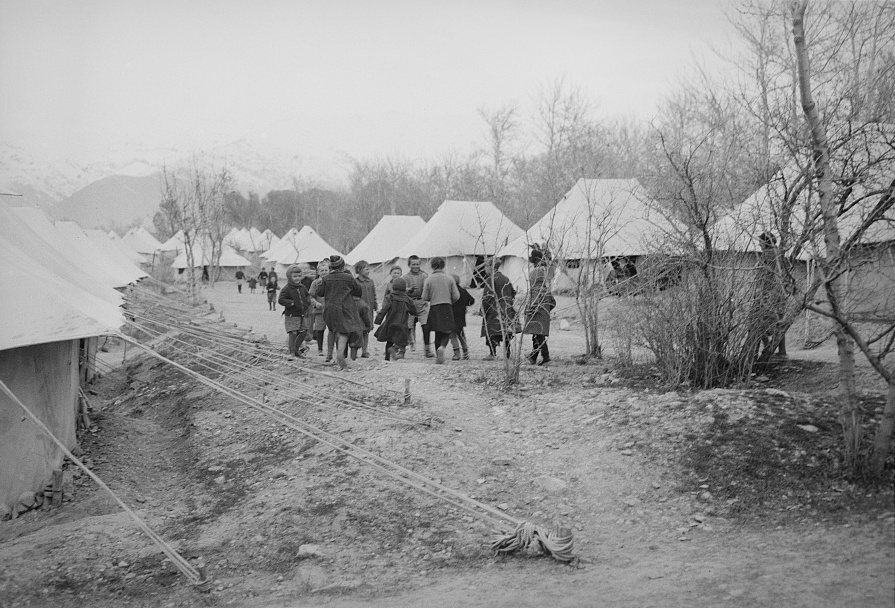
Polish refugee colony operated by the Red Cross has a colorful setting in the outskirts of the Tehran

Living in Africa was very difficult for the Poles who were unfamiliar with local customs and languages and were not used to tropical weather. In Uganda, the biggest camps—which housed some 6,400 people, including 3,000 children—were at Koja (Mukono District by Lake Victoria) and Masindi, Western Uganda. Each camp had its own school, clubroom, and theatre. The housing was primitive: dwellings made of clay, with roofs made of grass and banana leaves.

Bogdan Harbuz stayed at Koja camp: "We did not receive any money for food, we only got 5 shillings a month for our expenses. The food was delivered: rice, flour, meat, salt, sugar, tea, and some coffee. People kept their own gardens, with vegetables. We were very poor, there were no jobs, kids had their classes in the open, there were no books."

Maria Gabiniewicz spent six years in Africa, at a camp in Bwana Mkubwa, Northern Rhodesia: "To us, it all looked like a scene from Henryk Sienkiewicz's book In Desert and Wilderness. Houses made of clay, in the heart of Africa. Nothing looked like Poland, but adults in our camp did their best to emphasize our roots. There was a mast with a huge Polish flag, and the White Eagle on the gate."

==== Camps' closing ====
In January 1944, the Polish staff in all East African camps had been reduced. In an official letter from the British Authorities it was said: "It has been agreed that the welfare work in the Polish settlements must continue and the minimum staff stays to ensure this must be retained." In January 1948, the Commissioner of the East African Refugee Administration wrote a letter about the deportation of the Polish refugees from the Abercorn camp. They were going from Kigoma to Dar es Salaam and from there by ship to the United Kingdom, where their next of kin—often husbands and sons who had been fighting in the war—were getting courses and training for civilian jobs. The resettlement from Abercorn was called Operation Polejump.

The British did not have the intention of keeping the Polish refugees in East Africa when it was decided to take them there. Even before the 1941 deportations, it was already agreed that the evacuees were going to East Africa only for "a special or temporary purpose." However, in October 1946, the Secretary of State in London pronounced that refugees who could get a job in the area for at least 6 months, or had a sum of money sufficient to sustain themselves, could stay. In Northern Rhodesia, 245 evacuees were accepted for permanent residence. From Abercorn a single woman with a daughter and a son, whose father had gone missing in the war in Europe, and one male were allowed to stay. The single man has not been traced; the woman, Josefa Bieronska, moved to South Africa with her children. Her son died young due to an accident; her daughter still lives in South Africa with her grandchildren.

=== India ===
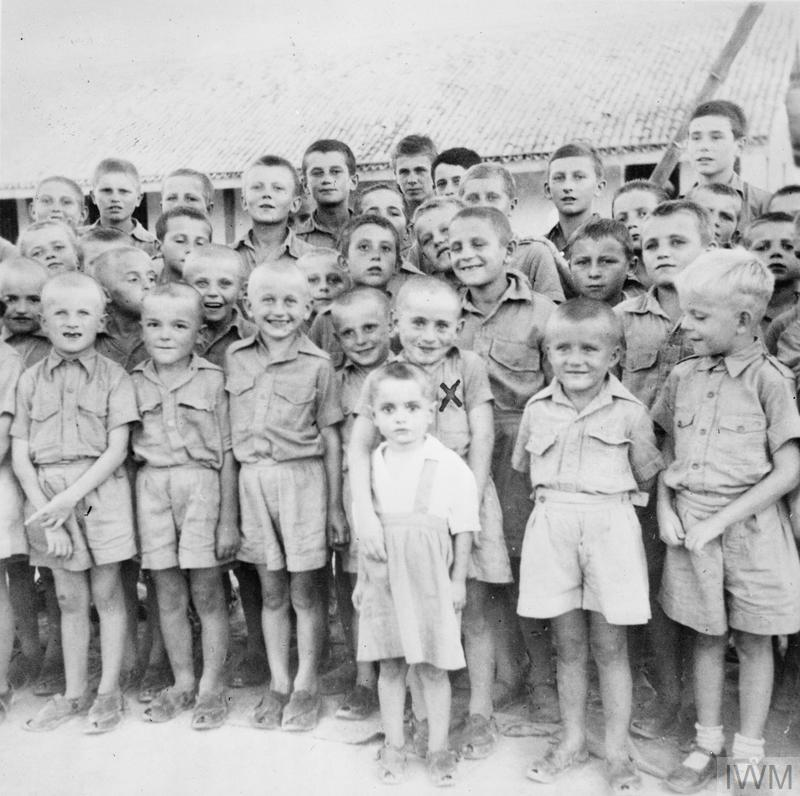
Polish child refugees and war orphans in Balachadi, India, 1941

Many Poles left Iran for India, thanks to the efforts of Polish consul in Bombay, Eugeniusz Banasinski. The Indian government agreed to host 10,000 Polish refugees, including 5,000 orphans. Children were taken care of by the Polish Red Cross and residents of Bombay. At first, they were transported to the town of Bandra, in the suburbs of Bombay, where Hanka Ordonówna took care of the kids. Then a special camp for Polish children was built near the village of Balachadi in Jamnagar, Kathiawar, thanks to help of the Maharaja Jam Sahib of Nawanagar (see also Help of Maharaja of Nawanagar for Polish refugees). Further Polish transports went to India by sea, from the port of Ahvaz to Bombay. Several camps were opened in and around Bombay, with the biggest one located at Kolhapur Valivade, where 5,000 stayed. Among people who stayed there was Bogdan Czaykowski.

Wiesława Paskiewicz, who stayed at Kolhapur, wrote: "Our daily activities were marked by school, church and scouting. We were mentally shaped by such organizations, as Sodality of Our Lady, and The Eucharistic Crusade. There were sports teams, a choir and activities groups."

Polish refugees in Kolhapur formed close relationships with the local population. Ramrao Ingle, a local lawyer, remembered that the “Polish people treated us as equals, unlike the British, who looked down on us”, while Nirmala Nesrikar remembered Poles and Indians regularly dining together and exchanging gifts. George Kowalski, who arrived in India in 1943, remembers his hosts as “welcoming and hospitable,” while Romualda Sznajder, who lived in Valivade for 5 years, also recalls the local population as “really accommodating, helpful. They learnt some Polish to better interact and trade with us.” Many young Polish orphans in India saw parallels between their own experiences and British Imperialism in India. Danuta Pniewska recalls going on a coach trip to Malvan with her scout troop, and chanting “English, go home” with local independence activists.

=== Iran and the Middle East ===
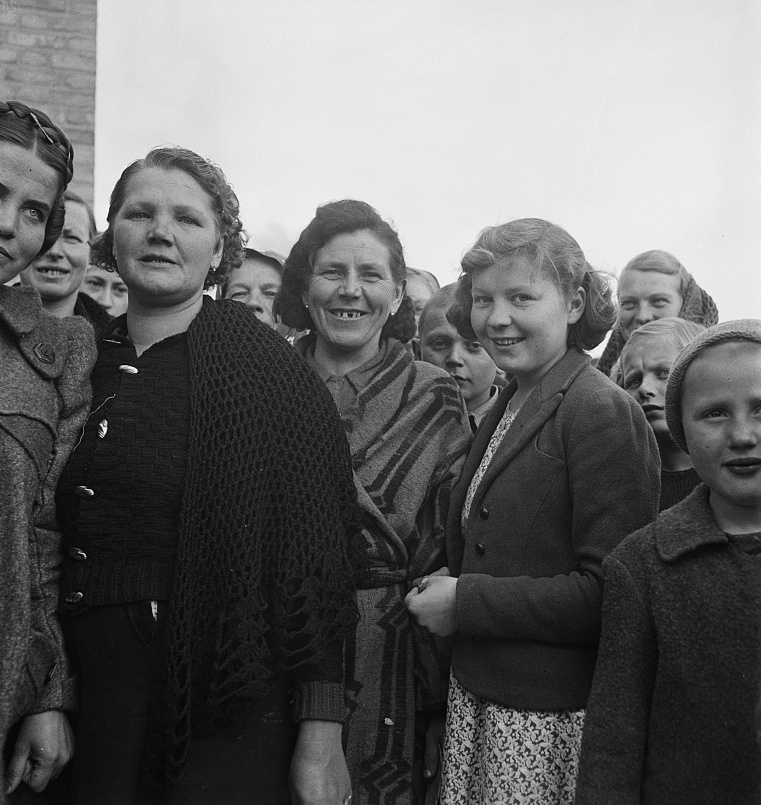
Polish women in Tehran

In 1942, about 120,000 refugees from Poland began their exodus to Iran from remote parts of the Soviet Union. Despite political instability and famine in Iran at that time, Polish refugees were welcomed by the smiles and generosity of the Iranian people. In late 1942 and early 1943, Polish camps in Iran were located at Tehran, Isfahan, Mashhad, and Ahvaz. First schools were opened in Tehran, where after one year there were ten Polish educational institutions. At Isfahan Polish orphanage, a children's camp was opened, where 2,300 children and 300 adults stayed and eight elementary schools were created. In Ahvaz, "Camp Polonia" was one of the main exit centers for Poles leaving Iran, and the last Ahvaz camp closed in 1945.

The first Polish refugees came to Palestine in summer 1942. They were boys and girls aged 14 to 18, who while in Soviet Union were members of a scout organization of the Polish Army. Transports of scouts, which went to Palestine, were directed to Camp Bashit. There, all were divided into several groups and began their education. In August 1942, two schools were created, for younger (aged 8–15) and older scouts. Classes began on September 1, 1942. Altogether, between 1942 and 1947, Polish schools in Palestine had 1,632 students. Furthermore, there were schools in Egypt, at Tall al Kabir and Heliopolis. Altogether, in 1943-44 there were 26 schools for Polish refugees in the Near East.

=== New Zealand ===
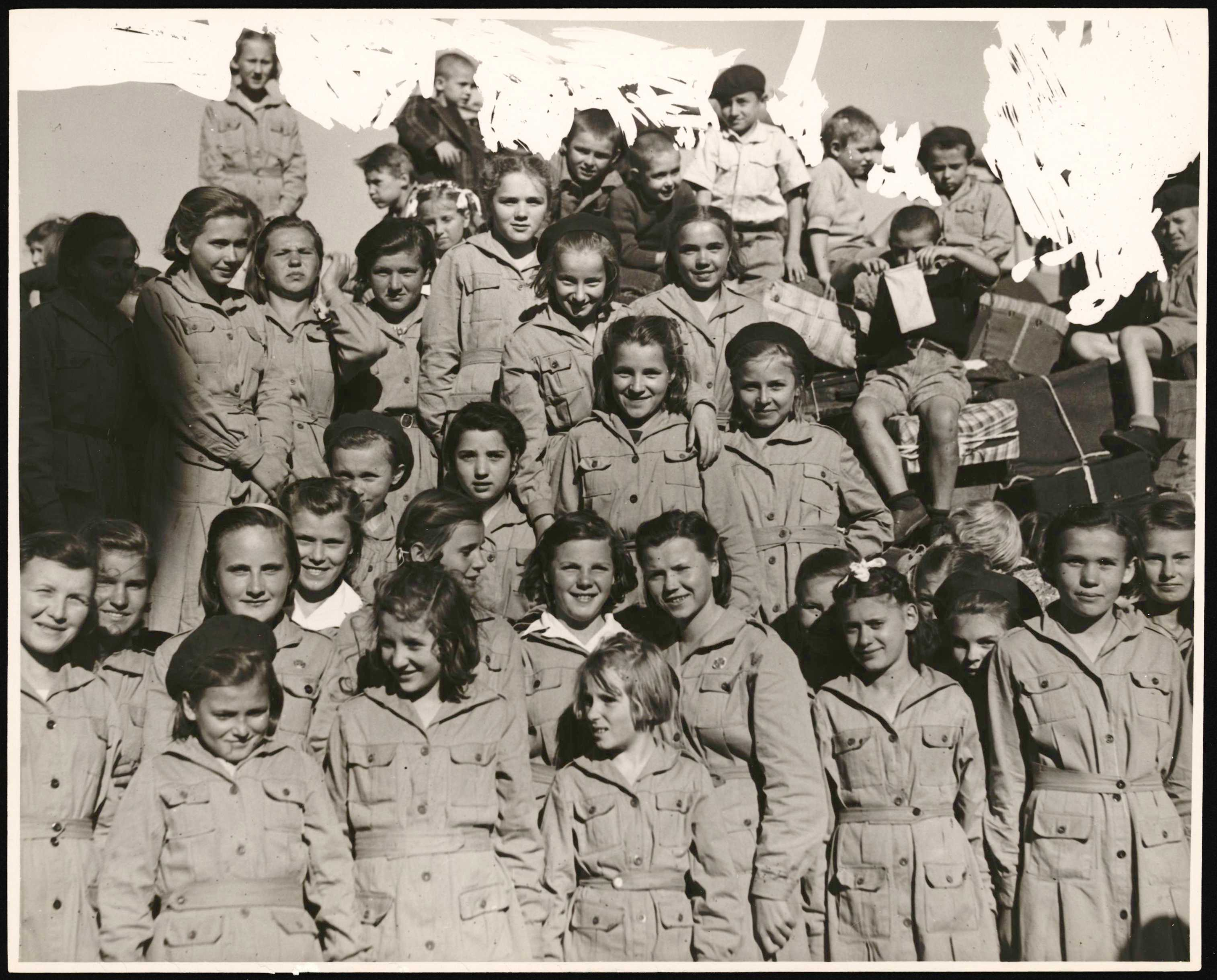
Polish refugees arriving at Wellington and at the Polish Children's Camp at Pahiatua, New Zealand, 1944

In 1944, the prime minister of New Zealand, Peter Fraser, agreed to take a limited number of Polish orphans and half-orphans, whose parents had died either in Soviet Union or Tehran, or whose fathers had fought at the front. While still in Isfahan, 105 teachers, doctors, and administrative workers were selected, plus one priest, Father Michał Wilniewczyc, and two Roman Catholic nuns. On November 1, 1944, USS General George M. Randall (AP-115) arrived at Wellington, with 733 children on board.

The children and the adults were then transported to the North Island town of Pahiatua, where Polish Children's Camp—Pahiatua—was opened in former military barracks. It had a clubroom, a hospital, and a gym. The main street of the camp was named after General Tadeusz Bór-Komorowski. There was a kindergarten, a men's school, a women's school, and a middle school. Later on, scouting teams were organized. Polish Children's Camp was financed by the government of New Zealand, with help from Polish Government in Exile, based in London.

=== Mexico ===
Upon agreement between Prime Minister Władysław Sikorski and the government of Mexico, some 10,000 Polish refugees settled in Mexico. The government of Mexico did not finance their stay—money came from the funds of a special Polish-British-American committee. Poles in Mexico were not allowed to leave their camps. They worked as farmers, and their first transport came through India in October 1943 with 720 people, most of them women and children. They settled in a camp at Santa Rosa, near the city of León, in central Mexico. Additional Polish transports arrived in late 1943.

== Poles who remained in the Soviet Union ==
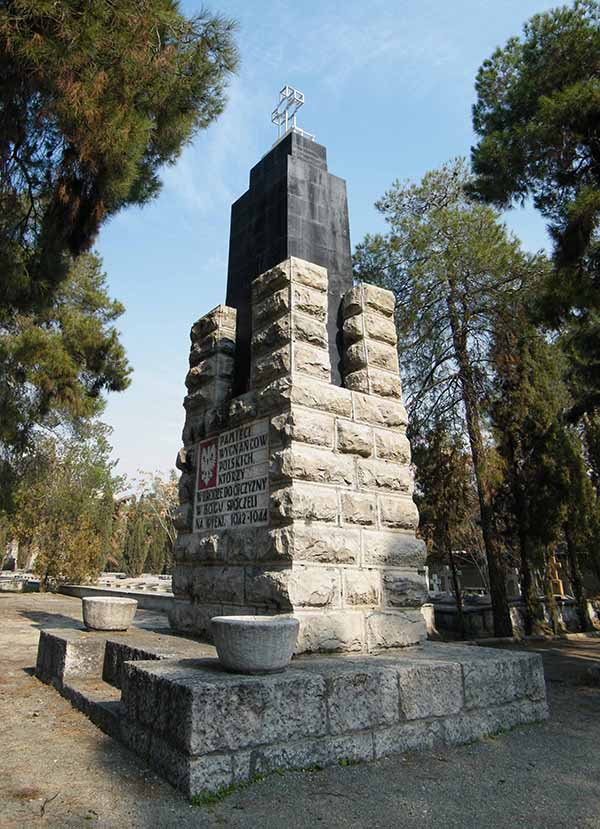
A memorial in Polish Cemetery in Tehran

After the Polish Army had left the Soviet Union, the attitude of the Soviets towards the remaining Poles worsened. Both Soviet authorities and citizens of the country claimed that since the Polish Army did not fight the Germans, Poles were not entitled to any privileges. On January 16, 1943, the People's Commissariat for Foreign Affairs issued a note to the Polish embassy, informing it about closing down Polish consulates in the Soviet Union and voiding the decision of granting Polish citizenship to the people who had lived in the Kresy before September 1939. This meant that all remaining Poles were re-granted Soviet citizenship and received Soviet passports. NKVD agents issued Soviet passports to Poles in February–May 1943. Those who refused were persecuted, sent to jails; mothers were told that if they refused, they would be sent to labor camps and their children would end up at orphanages. Altogether, 257,660 citizens of the Second Polish Republic (190,942 adults and 66,718 kids) received the passports; 1,583 refused and were sent either to prisons or gulag.

For the plight of Poles who remained in the Soviet interior until the defeat of Germany, see Polish population transfers (1944–46) and the population exchange between Poland and Soviet Ukraine. As the new border between the postwar Poland and the Soviet Union along the Curzon Line (requested by Stalin at Yalta) has been ratified, the ensuing population exchange affected about 1.1 million Poles (including Polish Jews) as well as close to half a million ethnic Ukrainians. According to official data, during the state-controlled expulsion between 1945 and 1946, less than 50 percent of Poles who registered for population transfer were given the chance to leave the westernmost republics of the Soviet Union. The next transfer took place in 1955–59, after Stalin's death.

== See also ==
- Flight of Poles from the USSR
- Katyn massacre
- Territories of Poland annexed by the Soviet Union
- Repatriation of Poles (1944–1946)
- Soviet repressions of Polish citizens (1939–1946)
- List of World War II prisoner-of-war camps in the Soviet Union
- List of Polish refugees cemeteries in Africa
- Iran–Poland relations
- Polish people in Pakistan
