= Soviet repressions of Polish citizens (1939–1946) =

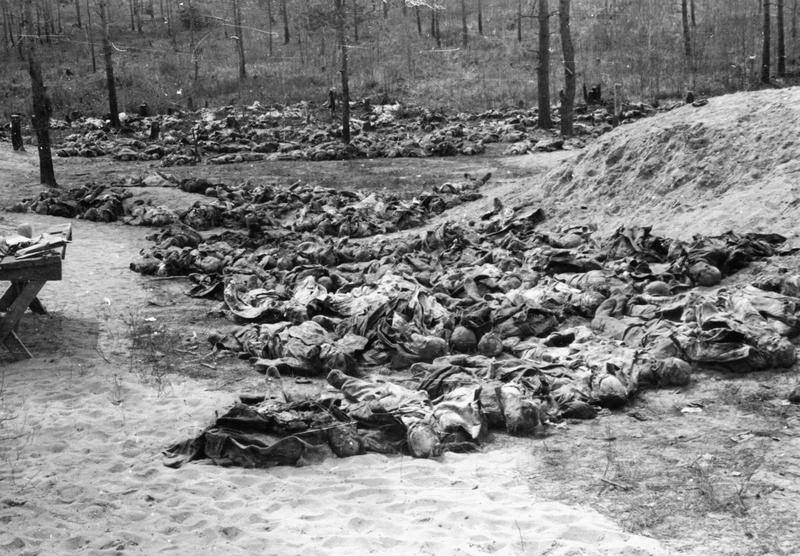
- Bodies of Polish prisoners-of-war by the mass graves of the Katyn massacre, awaiting forensic examination, 30 April 1943

Soviet invasion of Poland
- 500,000 Polish nationals imprisoned before June 1941 (90% male); 22,000 Polish military personnel and officials killed in the Katyn massacre alone; 320,000 Poles deported to Siberia in 1939-1941; possibly 100,000 women raped during the Soviet counter-offensive; up to 100,000 or at least 150,000 killed by the Soviets (Note: The press release for Szarota and Materski's study, which proposes the high estimate, roughly upholds the official Polish WW2 casualty figure of 6 million, announced by the Polish War Reparations Bureau in 1947. According to Brzoza and Sowa, the 1947 figure responded to a political need and was not based on any scientific research; since then, for example, the total deaths at the Auschwitz concentration camp have been revised from 2,5–4 million to 1,2 million, at Majdanek from 200,000 to 50–60,000, and at Żabikowo from 20,000 to 500.)

In the aftermath of the German and Soviet invasion of Poland, which took place in September 1939, the territory of Poland was divided between Nazi Germany and the Soviet Union. The Soviets had ceased to recognise the Polish state at the start of the invasion. Since 1939 German and Soviet officials coordinated their Poland-related policies and repressive actions. For nearly two years following the invasion, the two occupiers continued to discuss bilateral plans for dealing with the Polish resistance during Gestapo-NKVD Conferences until Germany's Operation Barbarossa against the Soviet Union, in June 1941.

The Molotov–Ribbentrop Pact was broken and the new war erupted, the Soviets had already arrested and imprisoned about 500,000 Polish nationals in the Kresy macroregion including civic officials, military personnel and all other "enemies of the people" such as clergy and the Polish educators: about one in ten of all adult males. There is some controversy as to whether the Soviet Union's policies were harsher than those of Nazi Germany until that time. An estimated 150,000 Polish citizens were killed by Soviet repressions.

== Aftermath of the Soviet invasion of Poland ==
The Soviet Union took over 52.1% of the territory of Poland (circa 200,000 km²) with over 13,700,000 citizens at the end of the Polish Defensive War. Regarding the ethnic composition of these areas: ca. 5.1 million or 38% of the population were Polish by ethnicity (wrote Elżbieta Trela-Mazur), with 37% Ukrainians, 14.5% Belarusians, 8.4% Jews, 0.9% Russians and 0.6% Germans. There were also 336,000 refugees from areas occupied by Germany, most of them Jews (198,000). All Polish territories occupied by USSR were annexed to the Soviet Union with the exception of the area of Wilno, which was transferred to Lithuania.

On 28 September 1939, the Soviet Union and Germany had changed the secret terms of the Molotov–Ribbentrop Pact. The formerly sovereign Lithuania was moved into the Soviet sphere of influence and absorbed into the USSR as the brand new Lithuanian SSR among the Soviet republics. The demarcation line across the center of Poland was shifted to the east, giving Germany more Polish territory. By this new and final arrangement – often described as a fourth partition of Poland, the Soviet Union secured the lands east of the rivers Pisa, Narew, Bug and San. The area amounted to about 200,000 square kilometres, which was inhabited by 13.5 million formerly Polish citizens.

Initially, the Soviet occupation gained support among some citizens of the Second Polish Republic. Some members of the Ukrainian population welcomed the unification with Soviet Ukraine. The Ukrainians had failed to achieve independence in 1919 when their attempt at self-determination was crushed during the Polish–Soviet and Polish-Ukrainian Wars. Also, there were pre-war Polish citizens who saw the Soviet NKVD presence as an opportunity to start political and social agitation. Many of them committed treason against the Polish state by assisting in round-ups and executions of Polish officials. Their enthusiasm however faded with time as it became clear that the Soviet repressions were aimed at all peoples equally.

== Soviet rule ==
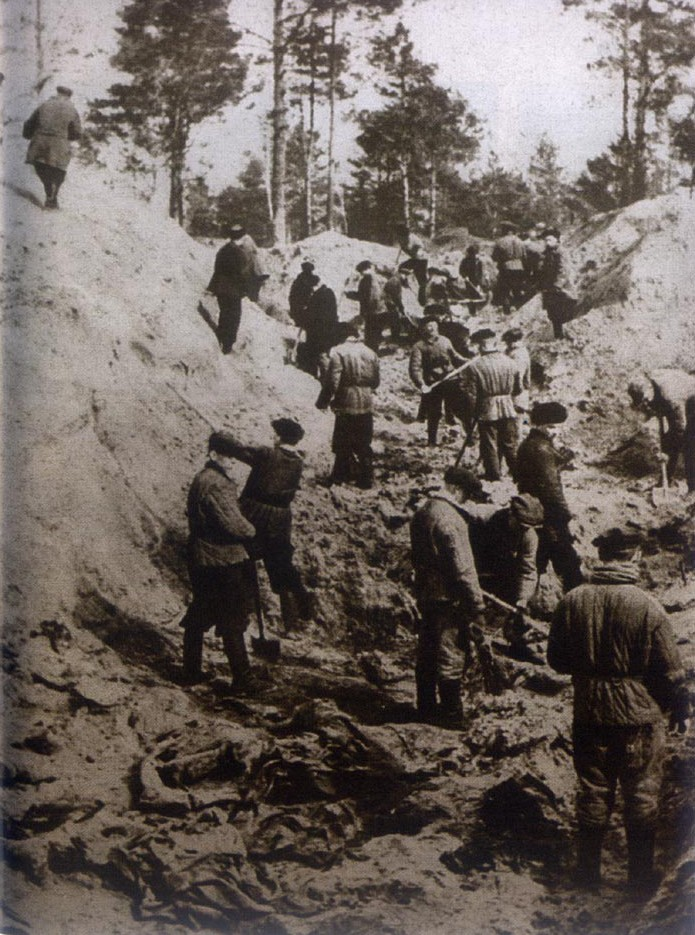
Exhumation of the Katyń forest massacre victims, murdered in 1940 by order of Soviet authorities

The Soviet Union never officially declared war on Poland and ceased to recognise the Polish state at the start of the invasion. The Soviets did not classify Polish military personnel as prisoners of war, but as rebels against the new Soviet government in today's Western Ukraine and West Belarus.^{[n]} The NKVD and other Soviet agencies asserted their control in 1939 as an inherent part of the Sovietization of Kresy. Approximately 250,000 Polish prisoners of war were captured by the USSR during and after the invasion of Poland. As the Soviet Union had not signed international conventions on rules of war, the Polish prisoners were denied legal status. The Soviet forces murdered almost all captured officers, and sent numerous ordinary soldiers to the Soviet Gulag. In one notorious atrocity ordered by Stalin, the Soviet secret police systematically shot and killed 22,000 Poles in a remote area during the Katyn massacre. Among some 14,471 victims were top Polish Army officers, including political leaders, government officials, and intellectuals. Some 4,254 dead bodies were uncovered in mass graves in Katyn Forest by the Nazis in 1943, who invited an international group of neutral representatives and doctors to examine the corpses and confirm the Soviet guilt. 22,000 Polish military personnel and civilians were killed in the Katyn massacre, but thousands of others were victims of NKVD massacres of prisoners in mid-1941, before the German advance across the Soviet occupation zone.

In total, the Soviets killed tens of thousands of Polish prisoners of war. Many of them, like General Józef Olszyna-Wilczyński, captured, interrogated and shot on 22 September, were killed during the 1939 campaign. On 24 September, 1939, the Soviets killed 42 staff and patients of a Polish military hospital in the village of Grabowiec, near Zamość. The Soviets also executed all the Polish officers they captured after the Battle of Szack, on 28 September.

The Soviet authorities regarded service to the prewar Polish state as a "crime against revolution" and "counter-revolutionary activity", and proceeded to arrest large numbers of Polish intelligentsia, former officials, politicians, civil servants and scientists, intellectuals and the clergy, as well as ordinary people thought to pose a threat to Soviet rule. In the two years between the invasion of Poland and the 1941 attack on USSR by Germany, the Soviets arrested and imprisoned about 500,000 Poles. This was about one in ten of all adult males. The arrested members of the Polish intelligentsia included former prime ministers Leon Kozłowski and Aleksander Prystor, Stanisław Grabski and Stanisław Głąbiński, and the Baczewski family. Initially aimed primarily at possible political opponents, by January 1940 the NKVD's campaign was also directed against potential allies, including Polish Communists and Socialists. Those arrested included Władysław Broniewski, Aleksander Wat, Tadeusz Peiper, Leopold Lewin, Anatol Stern, Teodor Parnicki, Marian Czuchnowski and many others. The Soviet NKVD executed about 65,000 imprisoned Poles after being subjected to show trials.

The number of Poles who died due to Soviet repressions in the period 1939–1941 is estimated by authors associated with the Polish Institute of National Remembrance, who uncritically uphold the 1947 official figures for Polish wartime losses, as at least 150,000. According to other scholars, who depart from demographic data and take into account the population Poland lost through post-war citizenship changes, the total figure of Soviet-inflicted Polish deaths in the entire World War II period (1939–1945) probably did not exceed 100,000.

== Mass deportations to the East ==
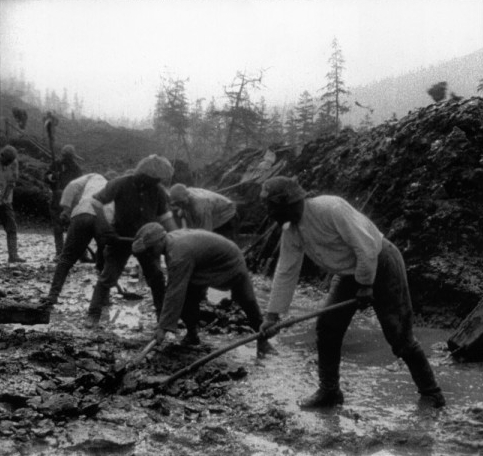
The "Road of Bones" constructed by inmates of the Soviet Gulag prison camps, including those of Polish citizenship

Approximately 100,000 Polish citizens were arrested during the two years of Soviet occupation. The prisons soon got severely overcrowded, with all detainees accused of anti-Soviet activities. The NKVD had to open dozens of ad-hoc prison sites in almost all towns of the region. The wave of arrests and mock convictions contributed to the forced resettlement of large categories of people ("kulaks", Polish civil servants, forest workers, university professors, "osadniks") to the Gulag labour camps and exile settlements in remote areas of the Soviet Union. Altogether the Soviets sent roughly a million people from Poland to Siberia. According to Norman Davies, almost half had died by the time the Sikorski-Mayski Agreement had been signed in 1941. Around 55% of the deportees to Siberia and Soviet Central Asia were Polish women, for whom sexual violence (rape, forced prostitution) was part of the experience of Soviet penal institutions, compounded by the traditional taboos of Polish society that prevented women from discussing their plight "while preserving their dignity".

In 1940 and the first half of 1941, the Soviets deported a total of more than 1,200,000 Poles in four waves of mass deportations from the Soviet-occupied Polish territories. The first major operation took place on February 10, 1940, with more than 220,000 people sent primarily to far north and east Russia, including Siberia and Khabarovsk Krai. The second wave of 13 April 1940, consisted of 320,000 people sent primarily to Kazakhstan. The third wave of June–July 1940 totaled more than 240,000. The fourth and final wave occurred in June 1941, deporting 300,000.

According to the Soviet law, all residents of the annexed area, dubbed by the Soviets as citizens of former Poland, automatically acquired Soviet citizenship. But, actual conferral of citizenship required individual consent and residents were strongly pressured for such consent. Those refugees who opted out were threatened with repatriation to German-controlled territories of Poland.

The Poles and the Soviets re-established diplomatic relations in 1941, following the Sikorski-Mayski Agreement; but the Soviets broke them off again in 1943 after the Polish government demanded an independent examination of the recently discovered Katyn burial pits. The Soviets lobbied the Western Allies to recognize the pro-Soviet Polish puppet government of Wanda Wasilewska in Moscow.

Deportations, though, continued in June 1944, around 40,000 soldiers and Polish Underground State officials who refused to join the Soviet-controlled Army were relocated to the most remote areas of the USSR. The following year, between 40,000 and 50,000 people - mostly from Upper Silesia - were deported to forced labor camps.

== Land reform and collectivisation ==
The Red Army had sown confusion among the locals by claiming that they were arriving to save Poland from the Nazis. Their advance surprised Polish communities and their leaders, who had not been advised how to respond to a Bolshevik invasion. Polish and Jewish citizens may at first have preferred a Soviet regime to a German one, but the Soviets soon proved they were also hostile and destructive towards the Polish citizens. They began confiscating, nationalising and redistributing all private and state-owned Polish property. Red Army troops requisitioned food and other goods. The Soviet base of support was strengthened temporarily by a land reform program initiated by the NKVD, in which most of the owners of large lots of land were labeled "kulaks" and dispossessed, with their land distributed among poorer peasants.

But, the Soviet authorities started a campaign of forced collectivisation. This action largely nullified the earlier political gains from the land reform as the peasants generally did not want to join the Kolkhoz farms, nor to give away their crops for free to fulfill the state-imposed quotas, which undercut nearly everyone's material needs.^{[b]}

== Dismantling of Polish governmental and social institutions ==
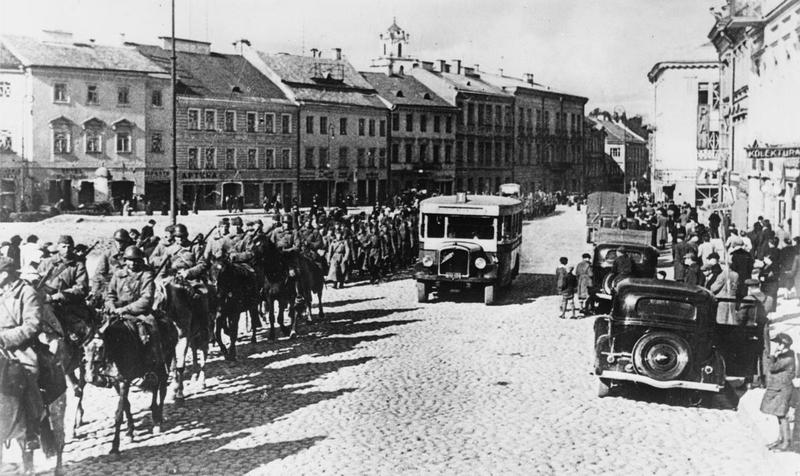
Soviet troops led by cavalry enter Wilno which was unable to launch its own defence

While Germans enforced their policies based on racism, the Soviet administration justified their Stalinist policies by appealing to Soviet ideology. In fact they initiated thorough Sovietization and to a lesser extent, Russification, of the area. Immediately after their conquest of eastern Poland, the Soviet authorities started a campaign of sovietization of the newly acquired areas. No later than several weeks after the last Polish units surrendered, on October 22, 1939, the Soviets organized staged elections to the Moscow-controlled Supreme Soviets (legislative body) of Western Byelorussia and Western Ukraine. The result of the staged voting was to legitimize the Soviet annexation of eastern Poland.

Subsequently, all institutions of the dismantled Polish state were closed down and reopened under the Soviet-appointed supervisors. Lwów University and many other schools were reopened soon, but they were to operate as Soviet institutions rather than continue their former legacy. Lwów University was reorganized in accordance with the Statute Books for Soviet Higher Schools. The tuition was abolished, as together with the institution's Polonophile traditions, this had prevented most of the rural Ukrainophone population from attending. The Soviets established several new chairs, particularly the chairs of Russian language and literature. The chairs of Marxism-Leninism, and Dialectical and Historical Materialism, aimed at strengthening Soviet ideology, were opened as well. Polish literature and language studies were dissolved by Soviet authorities. Forty-five new faculty members were assigned to Lwów, transferred from other institutions of Soviet Ukraine, mainly the Kharkiv and Kiev universities. On January 15, 1940 the Lwów University was reopened; its professors started to teach in accordance with Soviet curricula.

Simultaneously Soviet authorities tried to remove traces of Polish history in the area by eliminating much of what had connections to the Polish state or even Polish culture in general. On December 21, 1939, the Polish currency was withdrawn from circulation without any exchange to the newly introduced rouble; this meant that the entire population of the area lost all of their life savings overnight.

All the media became controlled by Moscow. Soviet authorities implemented a political regime similar to a police state, based on terror. All Polish parties and organizations were disbanded. Only the Communist Party was allowed to exist, with organizations subordinated to it. All organized religions were persecuted. All enterprises were taken over by the state, while agriculture was made collective.

== Exploitation of ethnic tensions ==
The Soviets exploited past ethnic tensions between Poles and other ethnic groups living in Poland; they incited and encouraged violence against Poles, suggesting the minorities could "rectify the wrongs they had suffered during twenty years of Polish rule". Pre-war Poland was portrayed as a capitalist state based on exploitation of the working people and ethnic minorities. Soviet propaganda claimed that the unfair treatment of non-Poles by the Second Polish Republic justified its dismemberment. Soviet officials openly incited mobs to conduct killings and robberies (1939–1945). The death toll of the initial Soviet-inspired terror campaign remains unknown.

== Installing Soviet satellite state in Poland ==
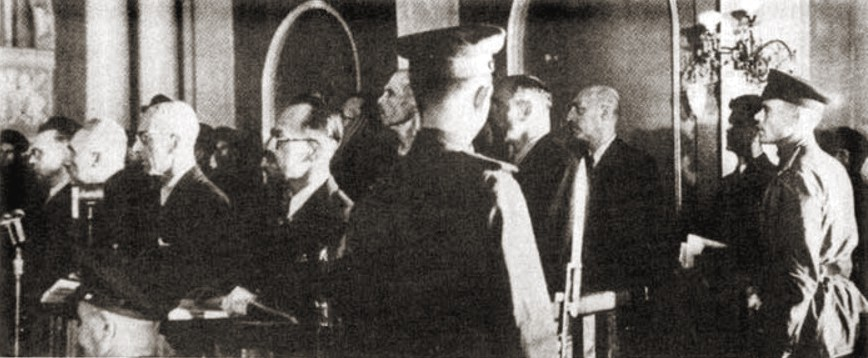
The show trial of 16 Polish wartime resistance movement leaders, convicted of "drawing up plans for action against the USSR."; Moscow, June 1945. The leaders were invited to help organize the new Polish Government of National Unity in March 1945, and immediately arrested by NKVD. Only two were still alive six years later

As the forces of Nazi Germany were pushed westward in 1945 in the closing months of the war, Poland's formal sovereignty was re-established by the Soviet-formed provisional government, later renamed as the Provisional Government of the Republic of Poland. The country remained under de facto military occupation for many years to come, controlled by the Soviet Northern Group of Forces, which were stationed in Poland until 1993. Some 25,000 Polish underground fighters, including 300 top Home Army officers, were captured by NKVD units and SMERSH operational groups in the fall of 1944. They suffered mass deportations to the gulags.

Between 1944 and 1946, thousands of Polish independence fighters actively opposed the new communist regime, attacking country offices of NKVD, SMERSH and the Polish communist secret service (UB). The events of the late 1940s amounted to a full-scale civil war according to some historians, especially in the eastern and central parts of the country (see: the Cursed soldiers). According to depositions by Józef Światło and other communist sources, the number of members of the Polish underground, rounded up by order of Lavrentiy Beria of the NKVD and deported to Siberia and various gulags in the Soviet Union reached 50,000 in 1945 alone. Their political leaders were kidnapped by the Soviet Union, interrogated under torture and sent to prison after a staged Trial of the Sixteen in Moscow. None survived. About 600 people died as the result of the Augustów roundup.

The documents of the era show that the problem of sexual violence against Polish women by Soviet servicemen was serious both during and after the advance of Soviet forces across Poland. Joanna Ostrowska and Marcin Zaremba of the Polish Academy of Sciences suggest that rapes of Polish women reached a mass scale following the Winter Offensive of 1945. The rapes were particularly widespread in the mixed Polish-German areas, such as Silesia, Masuria and Pomerania, and according to Polish officials a majority of women returning from forced labour in Germany fell victim to the sexual aggression of Soviet soldiers, but incidents of similar violence also occurred in Lesser and Greater Poland (no reports from Mazovia are cited). By way of comparison with the estimate of 10–20,000 Soviet military rapes in Czechoslovakia and a moderate 50,000 figure for the "wild estimates" of rapes during the Siege of Budapest in Hungary, Ostrowska and Zaremba cautiously introduce a guesstimate of around 100,000 Polish victims of Soviet military rape. A number of Soviet rapes are known to have been reported to the Milicja Obywatelska (e.g. 12 incidents in Olkusz, Lesser Poland, in two days), and sexual violence frequently took place despite the presence of witnesses or Milicja Obywatelska, whose officers would be disarmed by the soldiers.

To this day, the events of those and the following years constitute stumbling blocks in Polish-Russian foreign relations. In 1989, the Soviet Union under the leadership of Mikhail Gorbachev apologized for its crimes against Poland. However, in 2020, Russian President Vladimir Putin went as far as blaming Poland for starting World War II.

== See also ==
- Polish areas annexed by the Soviet Union
- Polish minority in the Soviet Union
- Repatriation of Poles (1944–1946)
- Czortkow Uprising
- Battle of Kurylowka
- Attack on the NKVD Camp in Rembertów
- Raids on communist prisons in Poland (1944–1946)
- World War II casualties of Poland
- Flight and expulsion of Poles from the USSR
- Monument to the Fallen and Murdered in the East
- Polish Operation of the NKVD (1937–38)
- Gestapo–NKVD conferences
- Nazi crimes against the Polish nation

== Bibliography ==
- Brzoza, Czesław; Sowa, Andrzej Leon (2006), Historia Polski, 1918–1945, Kraków: Wydawnictwo Literackie, ISBN 83-08-03845-X
- Timothy Snyder, Bloodlands: Europe between Hitler and Stalin, New York, Basic Books, 2010.
- Rafał Wnuk, 'Za pierwszego Sovieta'. Polska konspiracja na Kresach Wschodnich II RP (Wrzesień 1939 – Czerwiec 1941). Book excerpt. Institute of National Remembrance.
