= Flight of Poles from the USSR =

Forced migration during World War II

- part of the population transfer in the Soviet Union
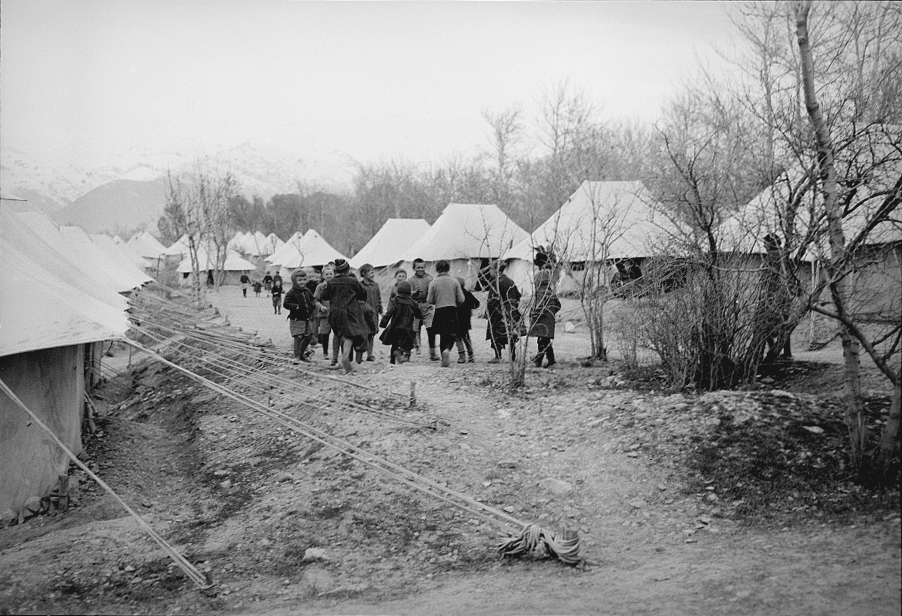
Polish refugee camp in Teheran, 1943 after successful evacuation of Polish citizens from the Soviet captivity in Siberia by General Anders

The flight and forced displacement of Poles from all territories east of the Second Polish Republic (Kresy) pertains to the dramatic decrease of Polish presence on the territory of the post-war Soviet Union in the first half of the 20th century. The greatest migrations took place in waves between the Bolshevik Revolution of 1917 and in the aftermath of World War II in Europe.

The first spontaneous flight of about 500,000 Poles occurred during the reconstitution of sovereign Poland following World War I. In the second wave, between November 1919 and June 1924, roughly 1,200,000 people left the territory of the USSR for Poland amid political repression of Polish–Soviet War and its aftermath. It is estimated that some 460,000 of them spoke Polish as a first language. However, throughout the interwar years, according to Polish estimates, some 1,2 million up to 1,3 million Poles remained in the vast territories of the Soviet Union including 260,000 in the former Minsk Voivodeship (Mińszczyzna), 230,000 in the Gomel Region (Homelszczyzna), 160,000 in the Kyiv region (Kijowszczyzna), and 300,000 in Podole region with roughly the same number spread out across the rest of the country. None of them were allowed to leave. In 1937–38 Polish minority became the target of the Polish Operation of the NKVD, in which 111,091 ethnic Poles were killed. The number of ethnic Poles in the USSR dropped by 165,000 in that period as the Soviet statistics indicate. Depending on size of their families, the fate of around 200,000–250,000 Poles was sealed after they have been purposely left with nothing to live on.

The next major wave of forcible displacement resulted from the 1939 Soviet invasion of Poland in which 700,000 and up to 1 million Polish citizens (Polish estimate, Soviet sources say 320,000) were deported to Siberia in a Soviet attempt to de-Polonize annexed lands in 1940–41. About 150,000 of them perished in the Soviet Union before the end of the war. The opportunity for organized flight came in a remarkable reversal of fortune. Following Operation Barbarossa, the USSR was forced to fight its own former ally, Nazi Germany, and in July 1941 signed a London treaty with Poland, granting amnesty for Polish citizens in the Soviet Union. The evacuation of the Polish people from Siberia by General Anders lasted from March to September 1942. Well over 110,000 Poles went to Iran including 36,000 women and children.

Spontaneous flight from eastern borderlands of the Second Polish Republic occurred during the Massacres of Poles in Volhynia and Eastern Galicia lasting until the end of 1944. Most Poles who survived World War II on Soviet territory left in accordance with the Polish-Soviet repatriation agreements. It was the final wave of mass migrations, referred to as the Polish population transfers (1944–46) in the aftermath of Allied victory over Germany. The displacement followed the Curzon Line accepted by the US administration and UK government during the Teheran, Yalta and Potsdam meetings with the Soviet leaders. Although not invited to participate in the multilateral talks, new Poland was assigned the so-called Recovered Territories as compensation for the loss of the eastern half of its prewar territory to the Soviets.

== Background ==
The numerically significant presence of Polish people on the territory of USSR was a direct consequence of the Partitions of Poland by the Russian Empire in 1795–1914. The Poles were being uprooted from Poland during national insurrections. After the November Uprising of 1830–31 some 50,000 Polish captives including 30,000 soldiers and officers were deported to Caucasus and Siberia. The total of 200,000 civilians were expelled from Poland in the following years, including extended families and children of the privileged classes, teachers and priests. After the January Uprising of 1863–64, some 50,000 Poles were deported, and 2,000 large landed estates were confiscated. The grinding poverty and oppression of the Russian rule was also the cause of economic migration. In the 25 years leading to World War I, some 400,000 Poles left the occupied territories in search of sustenance. The number of Poles in Russia proper reached 2.8 million by 1911 according to S. Thugutt, concentrated mostly in St. Petersburg, Riga, Kiev, Moscow, Odessa, Kamianske, Ekaterinoslav, and a dozen other large cities.

=== Russian Civil War and Polish–Soviet War ===
After Poland established independence during the First World War, thousands of ethnic Poles residing in Russia embarked on journeys home. Also, the unrest of the Soviet Revolution and Russian Civil War motivated many to reemigrate. Many Polish politicians, generals, writers, artists and composers, born in the Russian Partition and outside the Congress Poland/Vistula Land migrated to sovereign Poland in its 1918-1939 borders including the most prominent politician Józef Piłsudski as well as Władysław Raczkiewicz, commodore Stefan Frankowski, counter admiral Adam Mohuczy, Władysław Raginis, Jerzy Giedroyc, Tadeusz Dołęga-Mostowicz, Jarosław Iwaszkiewicz, Nobel Laureate Czesław Miłosz, Melchior Wańkowicz, and composer Karol Szymanowski. Future writer and painter Witkacy, Stanisław Ignacy Witkiewicz, participated in the Revolution. He emigrated to Poland with anti-revolutionary feelings. After the German and Soviet invasions of 1939, he committed suicide. Writer Paweł Jasienica, born in Russia, moved to Central Poland after the Bolshevik Revolution. He later lived in Grodno and Wilno, and, after World War II moved back to the new Poland.

== Between the wars ==
As the result of The Polish Operation of the NKVD (1937–1938), 143,810 people were captured, of whom 139,885 were sentenced by extrajudicial organs, and 111,091 executed (nearly 80% of all victims). According to Timothy Snyder, the majority of those killed were ethnic Poles; he says that 85,000 is a "conservative estimate" of the number of executed Poles.

The writer Igor Newerly grew up in the Soviet Union and ran away to Poland. Roman Catholic priest Wincenty Ilgin was imprisoned since 1927, exchanged with Lithuania in 1933, and died in Poland. Belarus writer Frantsishak Alyakhnovich was imprisoned in the Soviet Union. After being exchanged with Poland, he published his memoirs, In the Claws of the GPU.

== Soviet occupation of Eastern Poland 1939-1941 and 1944-1946 ==
During the years 1939-1941, the Soviets sovietized Eastern Poland, killing educated people (Katyn massacre), and deporting hundreds of thousands of people, including women, to Siberia. Many of the deported people left the Soviet Union with the Anders Army in 1943. Many of the soldiers and civilians died or never returned to Communist Poland after the war.

The Soviet Union annexed Eastern Poland and expelled the majority of Poles in 1944 and 1945. Poles deported during the years 1939-1941 were transported mostly to Recovered Territories. Anti-Nazi fighters were drafted to the Polish Communist Army, many of them arrested and deported to Soviet camps, some murdered. That started a partisan war between Polish Communists, supported by the Red Army and the NKVD, and the Polish underground, called Cursed soldiers. The biggest Soviet crime was the murder of about 600 people after the Augustów roundup.

Notable or future notable Poles who emigrated to Poland: archbishop of Wilno Romuald Jałbrzykowski, mountain climber Wanda Rutkiewicz, astronomer Władysław Dziewulski, philosopher Tadeusz Czeżowski, actor Gustaw Lutkiewicz. Future singer Anna German migrated from Russia to Poland because her mother married a Pole.

== Ukrainian nationalists ==
- Ukrainian nationalists organized massacres of Poles in Volhynia and Eastern Galicia during which (according to Grzegorz Motyka) approximately 80,000-100,000 Poles were killed.

An OUN order from early 1944 stated: "Liquidate all Polish traces. Destroy all walls in the Catholic Church and other Polish prayer houses. Destroy orchards and trees in the courtyards so that there will be no trace that someone lived there... Pay attention to the fact that when something remains that is Polish, then the Poles will have pretensions to our land".

== 1955-1959 ==
About 250,000 people were repatriated. Notable Poles evacuated during that time include singer Czesław Niemen, film producer Lew Rywin and actor Anna Seniuk.

== See also ==
- Flight and expulsion of Germans (1944–50)
