= Iran–Poland relations =

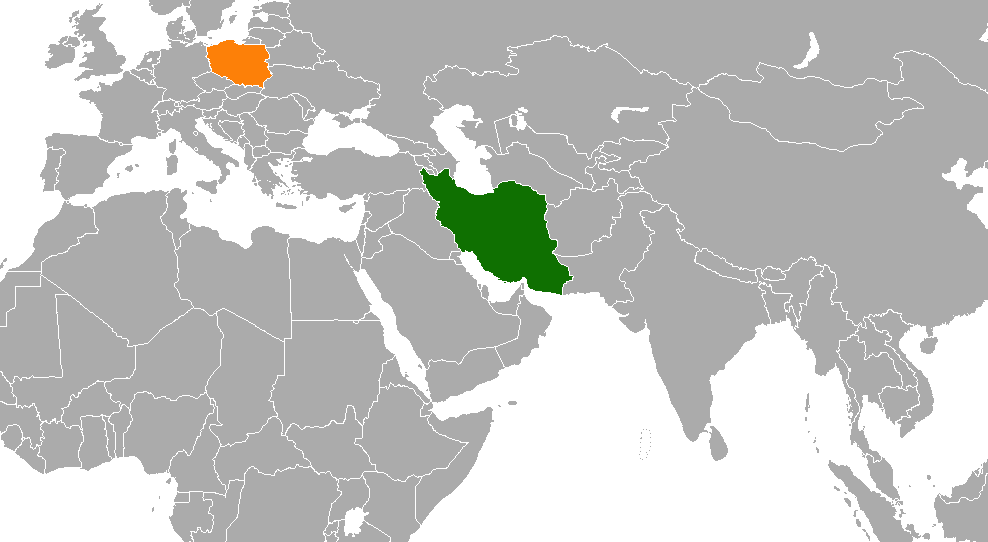

- Iran: Poland

The Islamic Republic of Iran and the Republic of Poland have maintained historical and bilateral relations. Both nations are members of the United Nations.

== History ==
=== Early history ===
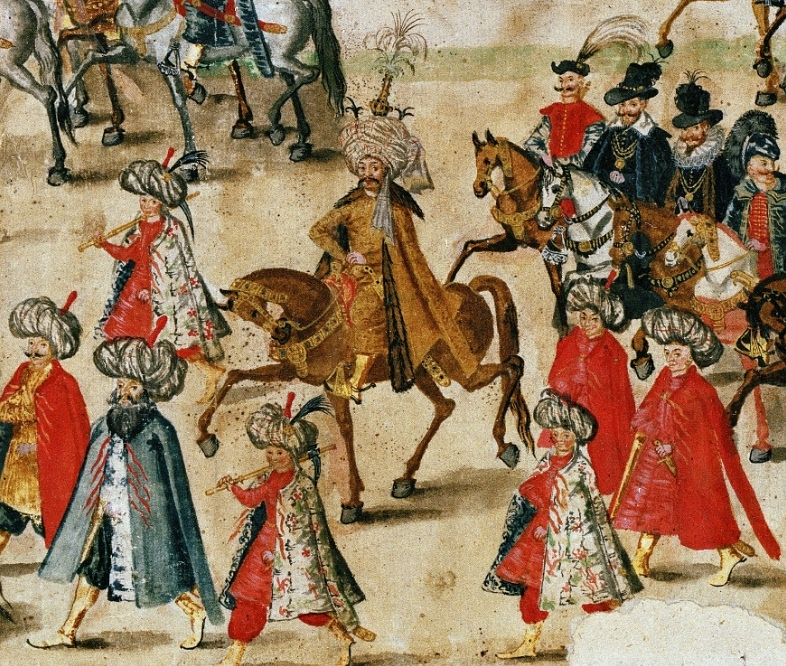
Persian ambassador with entourage during his entry into Kraków for the wedding ceremony of King Sigismund III of Poland in 1605

As early as the 16th century, Iranian merchants and trading caravans entered into Europe, made contact and exchanged goods with Polish merchants, with merchants from Iran noted in major Polish cities such as Toruń and Lwów. Isfahan rugs imported from Persia to the Polish–Lithuanian Commonwealth were incorrectly known as "Polish rugs" (French: Polonaise) in Western Europe. In the following centuries, Iran (known to the Europeans as Persia at the time) and Poland enjoyed friendly relations. The first documented visit of a Polish envoy to Iran took place in 1602, and a Persian embassy reached Kraków, Poland between 1609 and 1615.

In the 16th and 17th centuries, some Armenians migrated from Iran to Poland, including to Zamość and Lwów. Poland's victory over the invading Ottoman Empire at the Battle of Vienna in 1683 was celebrated in Safavid Iran. After the victory, Polish King John III Sobieski was granted the proud title El Ghazi by the Persians, and Shah Suleiman of Persia even contemplated a move to recover Baghdad, previously lost to the Ottoman Empire, however, he eventually abandoned the plan. For much of the 17th century, the ideology of Sarmatism was popular among the Polish nobility. At its core was the unifying belief that the people of Poland were descended from the ancient Iranian Sarmatians, the legendary invaders of contemporary Polish lands in antiquity.

Tadeusz Krusiński, a Polish Jesuit active in Iran, was the author of Relatio de mutationibus Regni Persarum, the first work on Persian history in Europe, written in the 1720s, and translated into several languages. In 1795, Iran was one of two countries (the other being the Ottoman Empire) to not recognize the Partition of Poland by the Austrian Empire, Prussia and the Russian Empire. After the partitions and following unsuccessful Polish uprisings, many Polish refugees fled to Iran. Among notable Poles living in 19th-century Iran were poet Aleksander Chodźko, Ignacy Pietraszewski, who translated the Zoroastrian Avesta into Polish, and Izydor Borowski, former participant of the Polish Kościuszko Uprising and member of the Polish Legions, who was instrumental in modernizing the Iranian army, and eventually became a general in Iran. Polish geologist Karol Bohdanowicz pioneered the geological survey of Iran's Khorasan Mountains.

=== 20th century ===
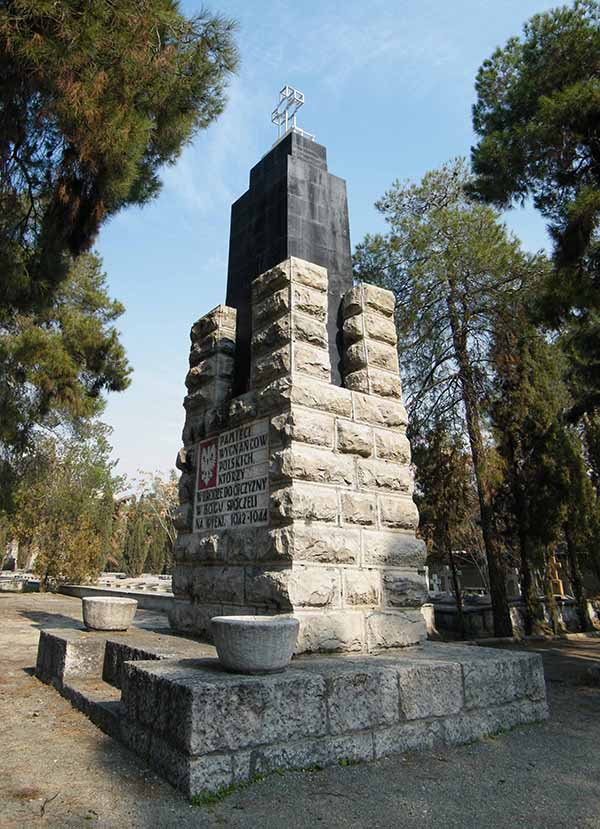
Remembrance statute of the dead Polish refugees in Tehran

In 1918, after the end of World War I, Poland regained its independence. In 1919, Iran recognised Polish independence, and both states established diplomatic relations. In 1927, both nations signed a Friendship Treaty, and in 1928, Poland opened a consulate in Tabriz.

In September 1939, Poland was invaded by Germany and the Soviet Union, which sparked the beginning of World War II. In 1942, approximately 120,000 Polish refugees arrived to Iran. The refugees were part of a larger exodus of between 320,000 and a million Polish evacuees who were forced out of Poland by the Soviet Union during the war and deported to the eastern parts of the Soviet Union including Siberia. With the assistance of Anders' Army, approximately 120,000 Polish evacuees left the Soviet Union for Iran where they awaited to emigrate to Palestine, Australia, New Zealand, South Africa, United Kingdom, United States and elsewhere. It was the largest migration of Europeans through Iran. Perhaps, the most famous historical figure among these migrants was Menachem Begin, who later became Prime Minister of Israel.

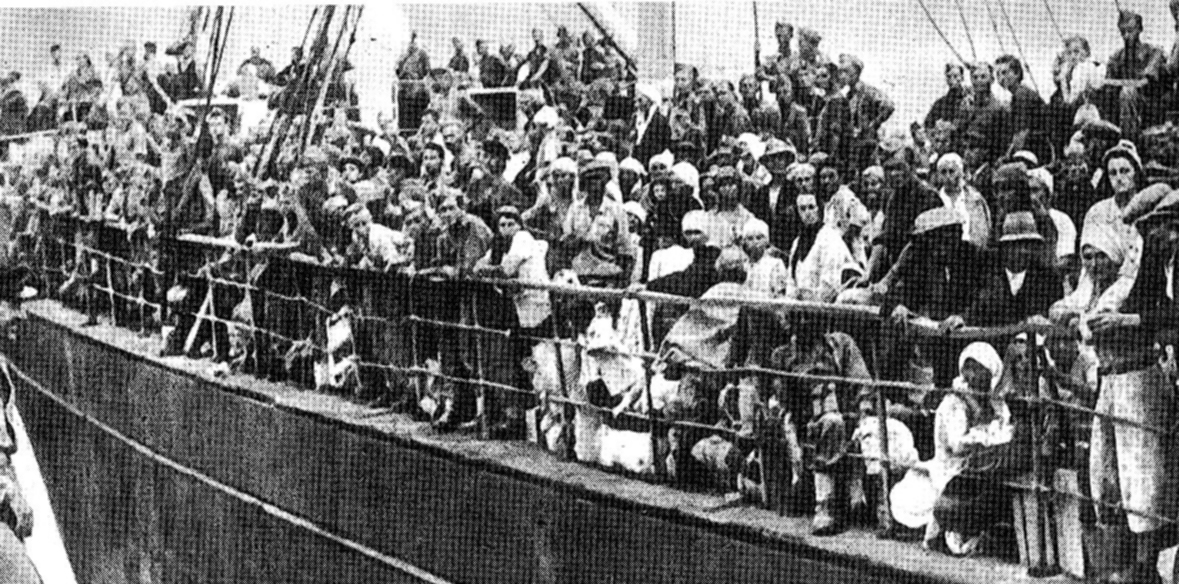
Polish refugees arriving to Iran from the Soviet Union

In Tehran, the refugees were accommodated in four camps; including one of the private gardens of Iran's Shah; was transformed into a temporary refugee camp, and a special hospital was dedicated to them. After the war, a few even decided to stay in Iran permanently, marrying Iranian spouses and starting families. Due to hunger and epidemics they suffered while held in Soviet Union, over 2,800 Polish refugees died in Iran, and there are several Polish cemeteries located in various cities of Iran (Tehran, Bandar-e Anzali, Mashhad, Isfahan, Ahvaz).

After World War II, Iran and Poland re-established diplomatic relations in August 1945. Their relations were elevated to embassies in 1962.

In September 1966, Shah Mohammad Reza Pahlavi paid an official visit to Poland. In May 1968, Chairman of the Polish Council of State, Marian Spychalski paid an official visit to Tehran. In 1979, Iran became an Islamic Republic after the Iranian Revolution. Relations between Iran and Poland continued uninterrupted ever since and several high-level visits have taken place between leaders of both nations.

=== Recent history ===
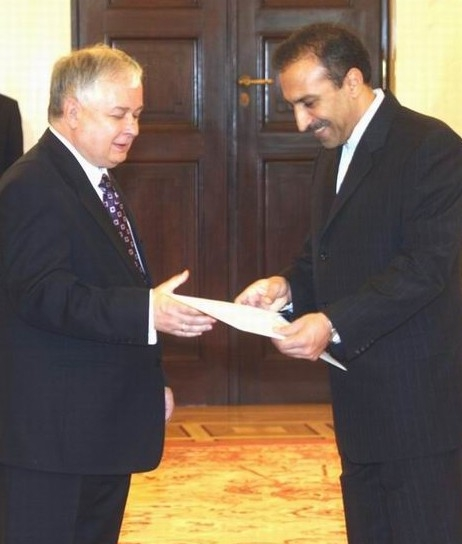
Poland's President Lech Kaczyński and Iran's ambassador to Poland Hadi Farajvand in Warsaw in 2007

Polish rescue workers and medics took part in the relief operation after the 2003 Bam earthquake, and humanitarian aid was sent from Poland to Iran.

However, in 2019, Poland hosted the February Warsaw Conference in Warsaw, a conference which was believed to be anti-Iranian. This prompted an angry reaction from the Government of Iran, and its state-run media ran a post condemning the Polish government as "fools in Warsaw". Subsequently, Iran cancelled a Polish film festival which was about to occur in Tehran.

In October 2021, Poland donated one million COVID-19 vaccines to Iran, with the Polish Ministry of Foreign Affairs stressing the centuries-old good relations between the two nations and also to defuse tensions over Poland hosting an anti-Iranian conference two years earlier.

== High-level visits ==
High-level visits from Iran to Poland

- Shah Mohammad Reza Pahlavi (1966, 1977)
- Prime Minister Amir-Abbas Hoveyda (1973)
- Prime Minister Mir-Hossein Mousavi (1989)

High-level visits from Poland to Iran

- Chairman Marian Spychalski (1968)
- Prime Minister Piotr Jaroszewicz (1974)
- Prime Minister Leszek Miller (2003)

== Bilateral agreements ==
Both nations have signed several bilateral agreements such as a Friendship Treaty (1927); Agreement on Trade (1952); Agreement on Road Transportation (1976); Agreement of Mutual Support and Protection of Investment (1998); Agreement on the Avoidance of Double Taxation (1998); Agreement on Air Transportation (1999) and an Agreement on Cooperation in the Field of Environmental Protection (2002).

== Trade ==
In 2017, trade between Iran and Poland totaled US$230 million. Iran's main exports to Poland include: Crude oil and oil products, petrochemicals, fruit, dried fruits (mainly pistachios and dried grapes) dates, plastics and plastic products, iron and steel, rugs and fitted carpets. Poland's main exports to Iran include: Agricultural machinery, food products, medical equipment and instruments, glass and home appliances.

== Resident diplomatic missions ==
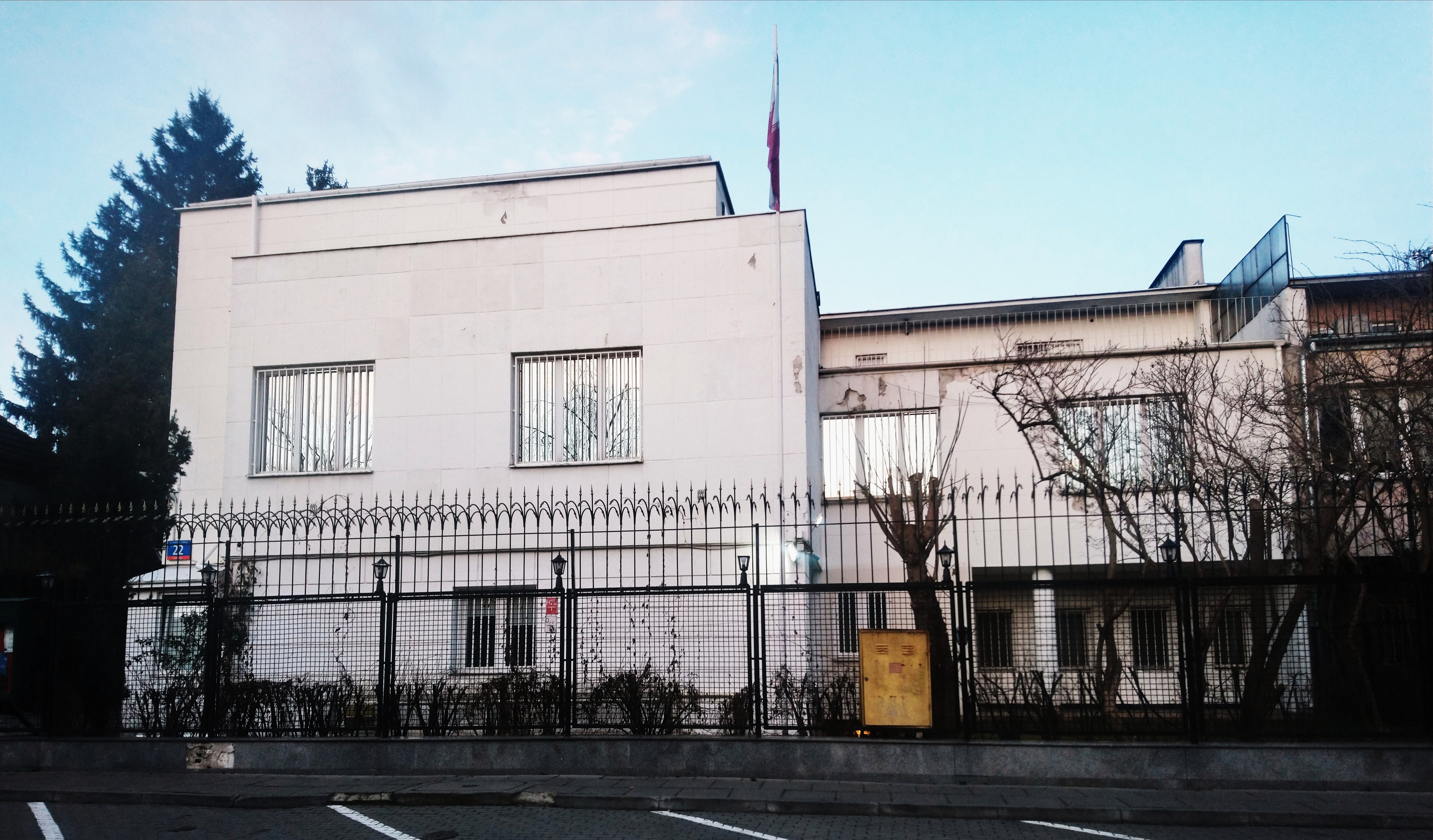
Embassy of Iran in Warsaw

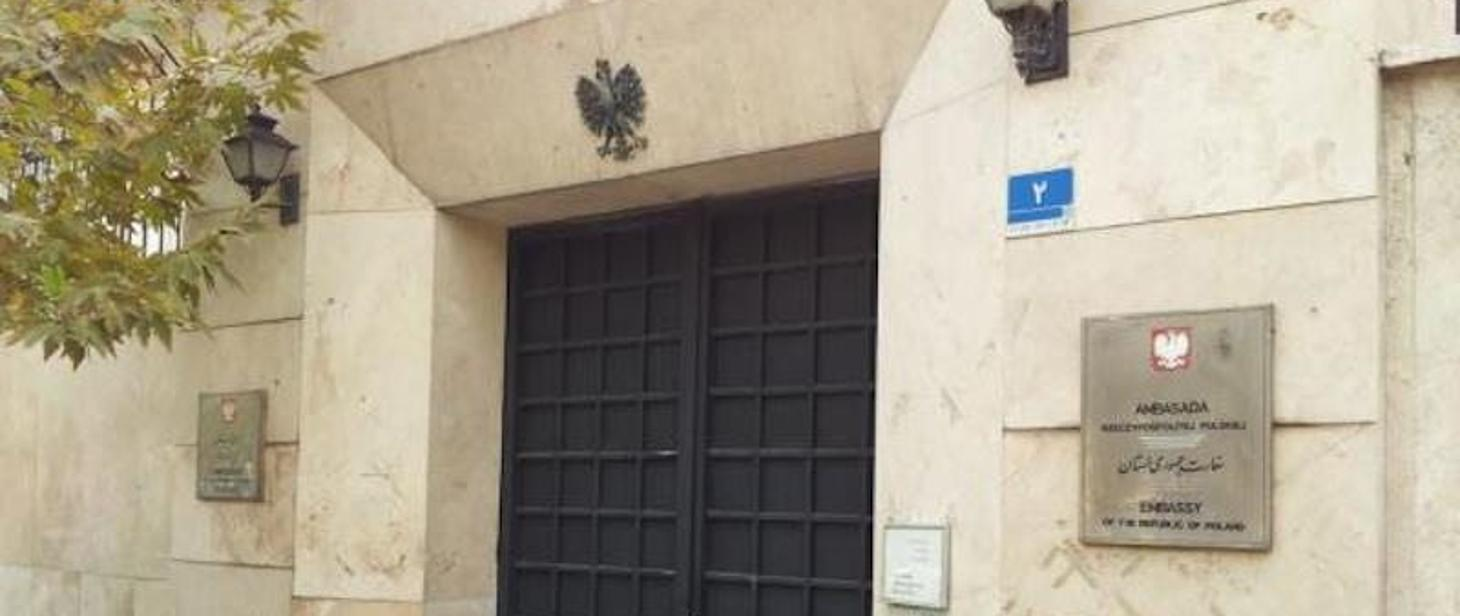
Embassy of Poland in Tehran

- Iran has an embassy in Warsaw.
- Poland has an embassy in Tehran.

== See also ==
- Foreign relations of Iran
- Foreign relations of Poland
- Evacuation of Polish civilians from the USSR in World War II
