= Amnesty for Polish citizens in the Soviet Union =

Amnesty for Polish citizens in USSR
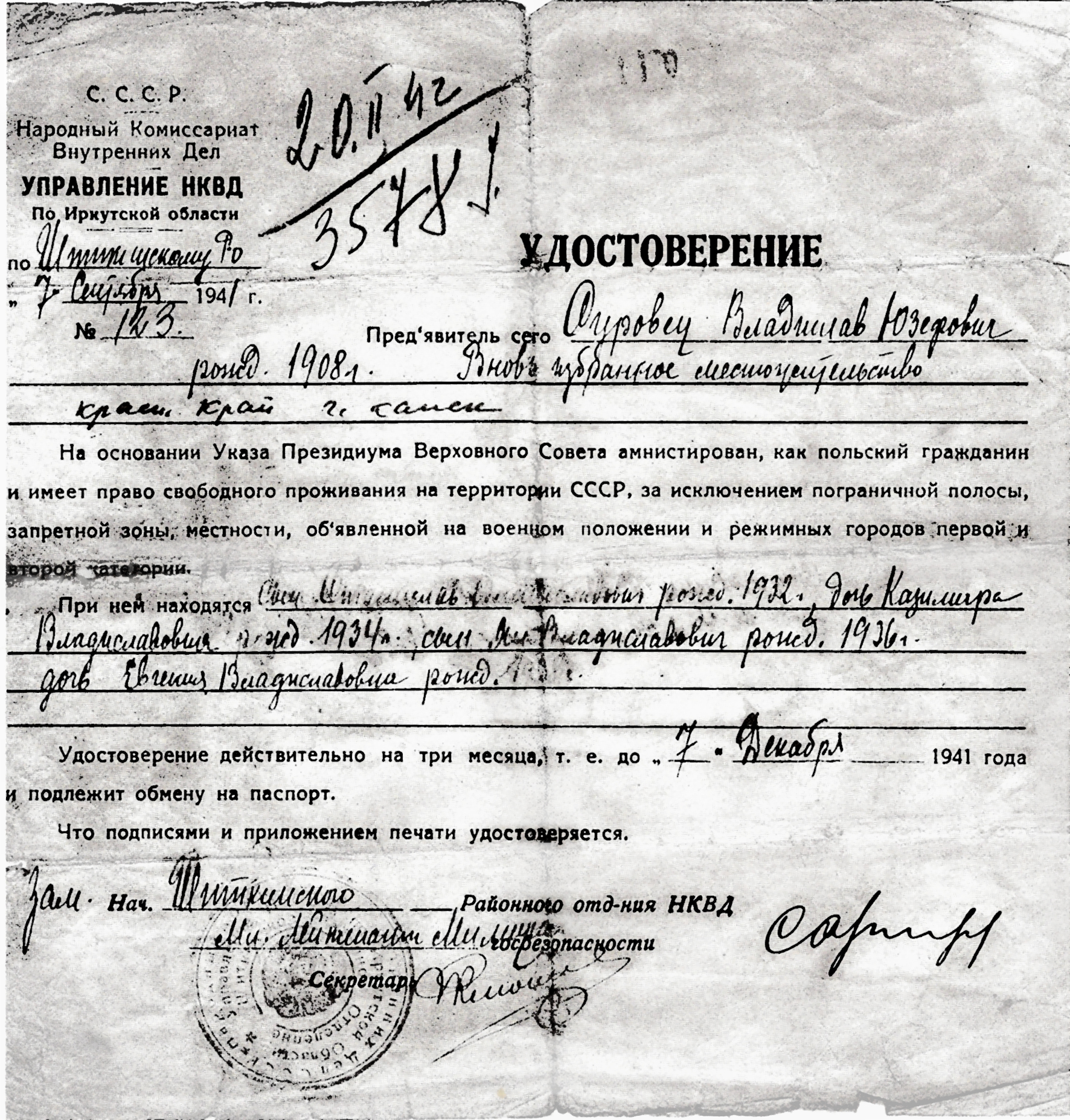
The NKVD release document from the Gulag for a Polish soldier and surviving members of his family, dated 7 September 1941

Amnesty for Polish citizens in USSR was the one-time amnesty in the USSR for those deprived of their freedom following the Soviet invasion of Poland in World War II. The signing of amnesty by the Presidium of the Supreme Soviet on 12 August 1941, resulted in temporary stop of persecutions of Polish citizens under the Soviet occupation. Their mass persecution accompanied the 1939 annexation of the entire eastern half of the Second Polish Republic in accordance with the Nazi-Soviet Pact against Poland. In order to de-Polonize all newly acquired territories, the Soviet NKVD rounded up and deported between 320,000 and 1 million Polish nationals to the eastern parts of the USSR, the Urals, and Siberia in the atmosphere of terror. There were four waves of deportations of entire families with children, women and elderly aboard freight trains from 1940 until 1941. The second wave of deportations by the Soviet occupational forces across Kresy (Polish eastern borderlands), affected 300,000 to 330,000 Poles, sent primarily to Kazakh SSR. The amnesty of 1941 was directed specifically at Polish victims of those deportations.

The opportunity for evacuation of Polish civilians from the USSR came in a remarkable reversal of fortune. Following Operation Barbarossa, the USSR was forced to fight its own former ally, Nazi Germany, and in July 1941 signed the Sikorski–Mayski agreement with the Polish government-in-exile. The treaty granted amnesty for Polish citizens deported within the Soviet Union. The evacuation by General Anders lasted from March to September 1942. Well over 110,000 Poles rescued by the Polish government travelled to Iran including 36,000 women and children. The decision whom to consider Polish belonged to the Soviet side. As of 1 December 1941, the release of Polish nationals no longer included members of prewar minorities. All Polish Ukrainians, Belarusians, and Jews were considered Soviet and excluded from the amnesty.

== History ==
The Soviet Union invaded Poland in 1939, breaking relations with the Polish government and repressing Polish citizens in the occupied territories. The outbreak of the Soviet-German War in 1941 and Sikorski-Mayski Negotiations led to the change of Soviet policies towards the Poles, as leniency was needed if Soviets were to recruit and create a Polish force under their command. On 12 August of that year Soviets issued an amnesty to Polish citizens.

Those who could prove they were Polish citizens had their citizenship restored (it had been annulled in the aftermath of the Soviet invasion in 1939). Yet there was no clear definition of the "Polish citizenship" and eventually the Soviets limited it only to Polish ethnicity (which de facto covered some Polish Jews, but not the Ukrainian or Belarusians who were former citizens of the Second Polish Republic). The decree did not cover people imprisoned or under investigation by the Soviets; and it was common for 'special cases' to be denied the amnesty on technical grounds or even denied information about the amnesty or the possibility of joining the Polish forces. Also some commanders of labour camps refused to release Polish citizens enslaved in them. According to an NKVD document of 1 August, 381,220 people were to be covered by the amnesty; however the generally accepted figure was over 1.5 million were deported.

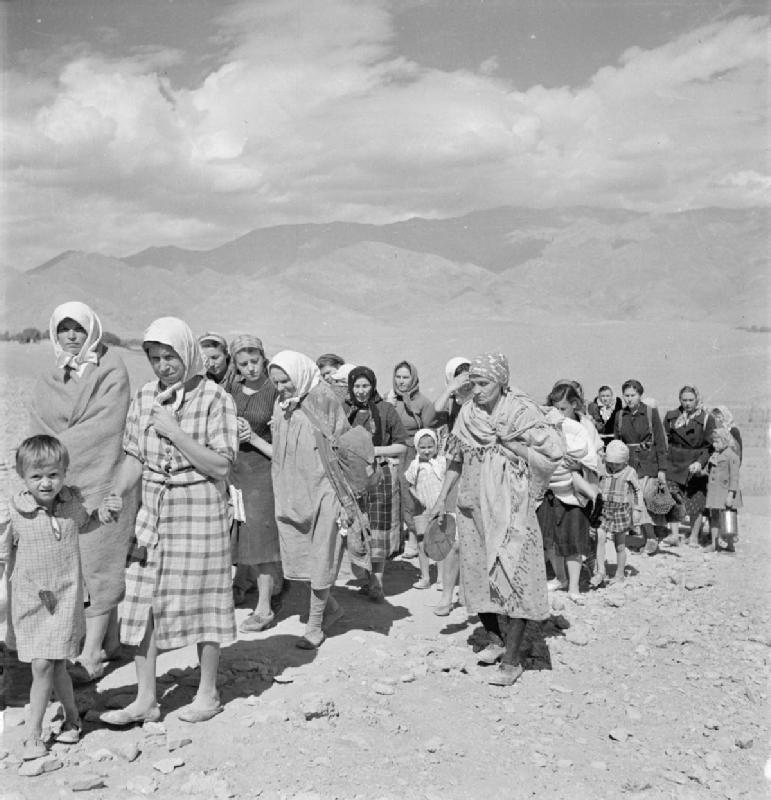
Polish refugees evacuated from the Soviet Union to Persia by General Anders, 1942

The term amnesty is criticized in Polish historiography, as it implies the Soviet Union had a legal basis for persecuting Polish citizens. Some of them were persecuted for "treason of Soviet Union", even though they had been Polish citizens in sovereign Poland, without ever breaking Polish law. The Soviet Union claimed that the territories they occupied in 1939 were Russian, and by virtue of a referendum they had organised, the inhabitants of these territories were therefore Russian citizens. Whereas Polish Prime Minister Sikorski's critics in the Polish government-in-exile held the view that an amnesty could only be granted by a State to its own citizens and these citizens were Polish. Dr. Józef Retinger — of whom Anthony Eden had said that after Sikorski was the most important person in the negotiations — states that the blame for using the word amnesty rather than release was entirely on the Polish side and not the Russians. In his memoirs Retinger writes; "I am afraid that the responsibility for this lies on the shoulders of a good Polish diplomat, Mr Potulicki, who drafted this document.". According to Retinger, Potulicki had erroneously used the word amnesty and not release in the text of the treaty and there was no time to change the document before the signing took place.

After Anders Army left Soviet sphere of influence, repressions towards the Polish citizens reintensified. Stalin effectively revoked the Amnesty on 16 January 1943 when all Polish citizens including Ethnic Poles were once again declared part of the population of the Soviet Union.

== See also ==
- Katyn massacre
- Polish areas annexed by the Soviet Union
- Repatriation of Poles (1944–1946)
- Soviet repressions of Polish citizens (1939-1946)
- List of Soviet Union prison sites that detained Poles
