= Elżbieta Trela-Mazur =

- Front cover of Powojenne losy inteligencji kresowej by Elżbieta Trela-Mazur et al.
- Born: 1947 (age 78–79)
- Occupation: Professor of Opole University
- Known for: History of territories of Poland annexed by the Soviet Union

Elżbieta Trela-Mazur (born 1947) is a Polish historian, author, Doctor of Humanities in contemporary history, and Professor in the Department of International Relations at Opole University, specializing in political history of modern world with emphasis on the history of Germany, Russia and the Soviet Union; totalitarianism, Sovietization of the Eastern Borderlands, Polish diaspora (Polonia) in Europe and elsewhere, as well as Central and Eastern Europe in general.

== Professional career ==
In 1973–89 Trela-Mazur worked at the WSP Institute of History (Wyższa Szkoła Pedagogiczna) in Opole, and in 1990–2004 at the Akademia Świętokrzyska in Kielce, as well as in Brussels (1998-2003). Since 2004 she has served at the Opole University Institute of Political Science. Trela-Mazur received her degree of Doctor of Humanities in 1979 for the work Education among Polish children in the Soviet Union in the years 1941-1946; awarded First Prize in Doctoral Thesis for the year 1979 by the Ministry of Science, Higher Education and Technology.

Trela-Mazur obtained her post-doctoral degree in 1999 at the University of Opole for dissertation titled Sovietization of education in eastern Lesser Poland under Soviet occupation from 1939 to 1941. The work earned Trela-Mazur an Achievement Award from WSP. In her scientific and archival research into history of Polish education in the eastern part of the Second Polish Republic she travelled to Leningrad in 1981 and to Lviv in 1996. Trela-Mazur wrote over a dozen articles on the fate of the Polish community in Western Europe as well, following the collapse of the Soviet empire in 1989.

== Powojenne losy ==
Trela-Mazur is the author of a compendium of postwar history of Polish intelligentsia from the eastern territories of Poland (known as Kresy), which were incorporated into the Soviet Union by Joseph Stalin at the end of World War II. The book, Powojenne losy inteligencjii kresowej (Postwar History of the Kresy Intelligentsia), is a result of conference held in November 2005 in Opole, in which 16 notable writers and academics participated. The monograph, composed of articles resulting from their research, is focused on specific regions of Kresy, including Wilno Voivodeship (1926–1939), Polesie Voivodeship, and Wołyń Voivodeship (1921–39). Apparently, the most notable paradox of the flight and expulsion of Poles from the Kresy macroregion was that following border shift, the eastern spirit was revived mainly in the westernmost part of new Poland. Contributing writers included S. Czerkas, J. Duda, E. Dworzak, A. Guzik, A. Hanich, P. Harupa, J. Hickiewicz, A. Hlebowicz, H. Stroński, Stanisław Vincenz, A. Wierciński, A. Wolny, and Elżbieta Trela-Mazur.

== Books ==
- Elżbieta Trela-Mazur, Polskie placówki oświatowe i wychowawcze w Związku Radzieckim w latach 1943-1946 : liczebność i rozmieszczenie (book), 5 editions, 1981, OCLC 609460851
- Elżbieta Trela-Mazur, Edukacja dzieci polskich w Związku Radzieckim w latach 1941-1946 (book), 5 editions, 1983, OCLC 17919580
- Elżbieta Trela-Mazur, Sowietyzacja oświaty w Małopolsce Wschodniej pod radziecką okupacją 1939-1941 (book), 3 editions, 1998 in Polish and in Russian translation, OCLC 237334907
- Elżbieta Trela-Mazur (with) Maria Kalczyńska & Krystyna Rostocka, Kresowianie na śląsku opolskim / Eastern borderland expatriates in Opole Silesia (book), 2 editions, 2011, OCLC 841094385
- Elżbieta Trela-Mazur, Powojenne losy inteligencji kresowej : materiały z konferencji naukowej, Opole 18-19 listopada 2005 roku (book), 1 edition, 2007, OCLC 750112292
- Elżbieta Trela-Mazur, Problemy bezpieczeństwa współczesnego świata (book), 2 editions, 2009, OCLC 751246585
- Elżbieta Trela-Mazur, Małopolska Wschodnia po 17 września 1939 roku : sowietyzacja - wybrane zagadnienia (book), 1 edition, 1998, OCLC 922228462
