= Camp Polonia =

Refugee camp in Ahvaz, Iran during World War II

Camp Polonia (now called Campolo, though the origin of that name is no longer widely known locally) was a district of Ahvaz, Iran, which housed Polish refugees during World War II. The refugees were Polish citizens who with the outbreak of World War II, had been deported into the Soviet Union, but were then released when Stalin declared amnesty for the Poles, and were then allowed to leave the USSR in 1942 to go to the refugee camps in Iran and later British held India. Over 115,000 arrived in Iran, roughly 75,000 were soldiers, cadets, and officers of what was known as Anders’ Army, a Polish army in exile that had assembled in the Soviet Union under the command of General Wladyslaw Anders. The rest were mothers and babies, elderly men and women, and children. At least three thousand of these refugees being Jewish, including four rabbis and nearly 1,000 unaccompanied children who were taken from Polish orphanages in the Soviet Union.

At the close of World War II, Ahvaz was one of the main exit centers for Poles leaving Iran, and the last Ahvaz camp closed in 1945.
