= Stefan Frankowski =

Polish rear admiral (1887–1940)

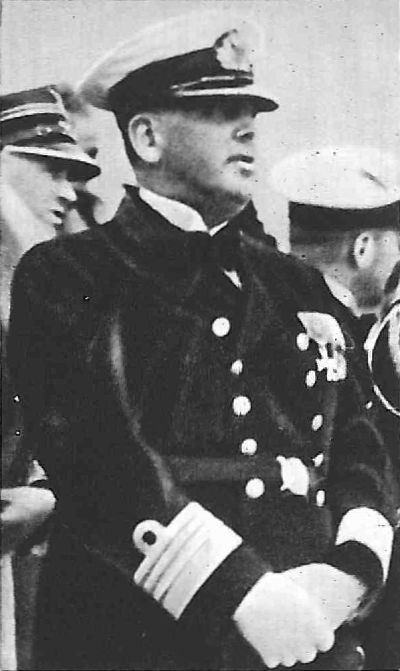

Personal details
- Born: 3 April 1887 Hołowli, Russian Empire
- Died: 25 September 1940 (aged 53) Bielawa, III Reich
- Awards: Golden Cross of Virtuti Militari

Military service
- Allegiance: Imperial Russian Navy; Polish Navy
- Years of service: 1908-1940
- Rank: Captain; Commodore (posthumously)

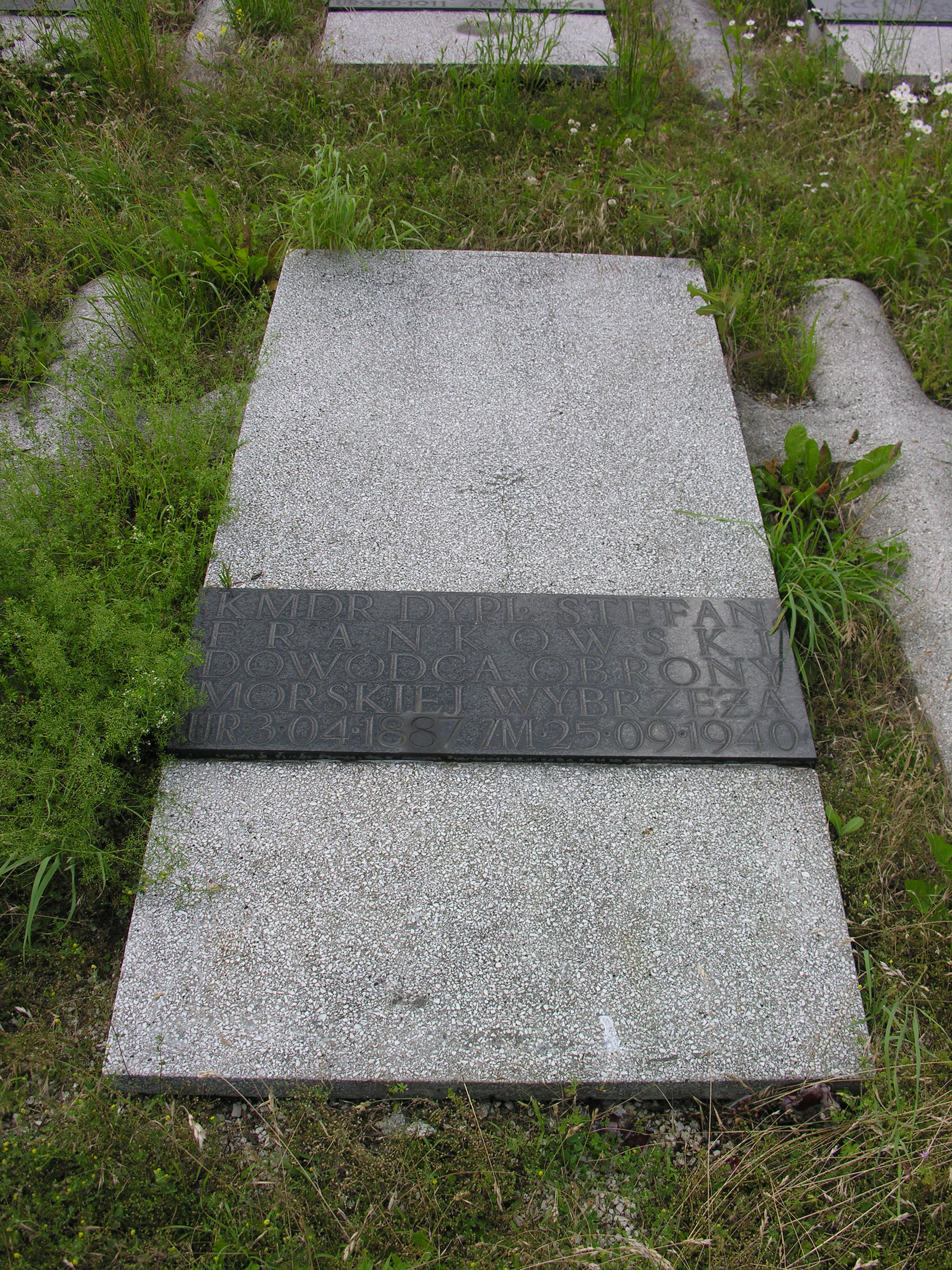
Grave of Stefan Frankowski in Wrocław

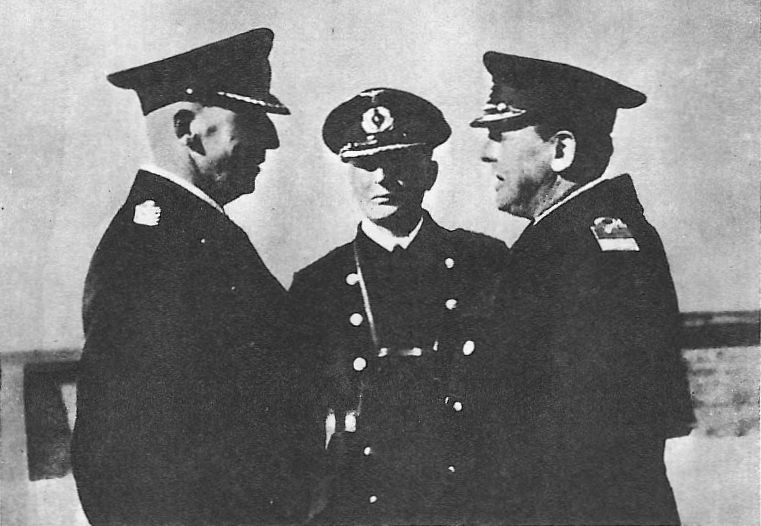
Captain Stefan Frankowski and konteradmiral Hubert Schmundt, Hel 1939

Stefan Frankowski (3 April 1887, in Volhynia – 25 September 1940, in Bielawa) was a Polish Captain, posthumously promoted to Rear Admiral. An officer of surface naval ships, from 1908 to 1917 he served in the Russian Imperial Navy and participated in the First World War. Later he joined the Polish Navy and commanded a squadron of torpedo boats, was the commander of the Polish Navy NCO School, and was chief of Director Staff of Polish Navy. During the Invasion of Poland of 1939 he was a commander of Naval Coast Defence. Taken prisoner of war by the Germans, he died in captivity in 1940.

== Biography ==
In the years 1899-1905 he was a student of a six-grade school in Kiev. In 1908 he graduated from the Naval Cadet Corps in Saint Petersburg and was promoted to the rank of michman. During his service in the Imperial Russian Navy he sailed as a navigation officer on surface ships: the battleships "Cesarewicz" and "Slava" and the cruiser "Aurora". In 1912 he was promoted to lieutenant (Lieutenant (junior grade)). In 1913 he attended a course for navigation officers. During World War I he was a navigation officer in the 2nd Battleship Brigade of the Baltic Sea Fleet.

In 1919 he volunteered for the Polish Army and took up the position of head of the Operations Department in the Navy Section of the Ministry of Military Affairs in Warsaw. For a short time he was acting head of the Navy Section. After its transformation into the Department for Maritime Affairs, he became head of the Operations Department in the Organizational Section. He also led the work of the Verification Commission for Officers. Between 1919 and 1920 he worked as an officer for orders and a maritime representative in Stockholm. After returning to Poland, he became the commendant of the course for officers of the Riverine-Coast Corps, and then head of the Personnel-Training Section in the Department for Maritime Affairs. When the Navy Management was established in Warsaw, he was appointed head of the Regulations and Training Department, and shortly afterwards he was appointed head of the Organizational-Mobilization Department. From October 1923 to September 1925, he was a student of the École navale in France. On November 17, 1925, the Minister of Military Affairs awarded him the academic title of General Staff officer. In September 1925 he took over command of the torpedo boat squadron in Gdynia. From 1926 to 1929 he was commanding the Naval Officers' School in Toruń. On 27 April 1929 he became chief of staff in the Navy Management in Warsaw. He was dismissed from his position due to failure to secure documents. On 11 April 1933 he received the position of commander of Coastal Defence. After its separation in 1939 he commanded the Coastal Defence in Gdynia. In 1929 he became the president of the Main Committee of the Marshal Józef Piłsudski Submarine Fund. From 1931 to 1935 he chaired the Editorial Committee of the "Przegląd Morski" (Morski Review). He was also a member of the Main Council of the Maritime and Colonial League.

During the defense of the Coast during the Invasion of Poland, he commanded the entire army gathered on the Hel Peninsula and the mine ships in the Gdańsk Bay. On 3 September 1939 he decided to evacuate the Coastal Defense Command to Hel. After the campaign he was held in German captivity in the oflags: X B Nimburg, XVII C Spittal, II C Woldenberg and VIII B Silberberg. In 1940, in serious condition, he was transported to the hospital in Bielawa, where he died on September 25. After Second World War, his remains were exhumed and buried at the Polish Soldiers' Cemetery in Wrocław-Oporów. On 26 September 1946 he was posthumously promoted to the rank of Kontradmirał (Commodore).

== Personal life ==
In 1922, Stefan Frankowski married Maria Róża née Dobrowolska. They had two children, a son, Stefan (1924–1961), and a daughter, Jolanta. He was an encyclopaedist. He was listed among the editors of the eight-volume Military Encyclopedia published in the years 1931–1939. He was a member of the editorial committee of this encyclopedia.

== Promotions ==
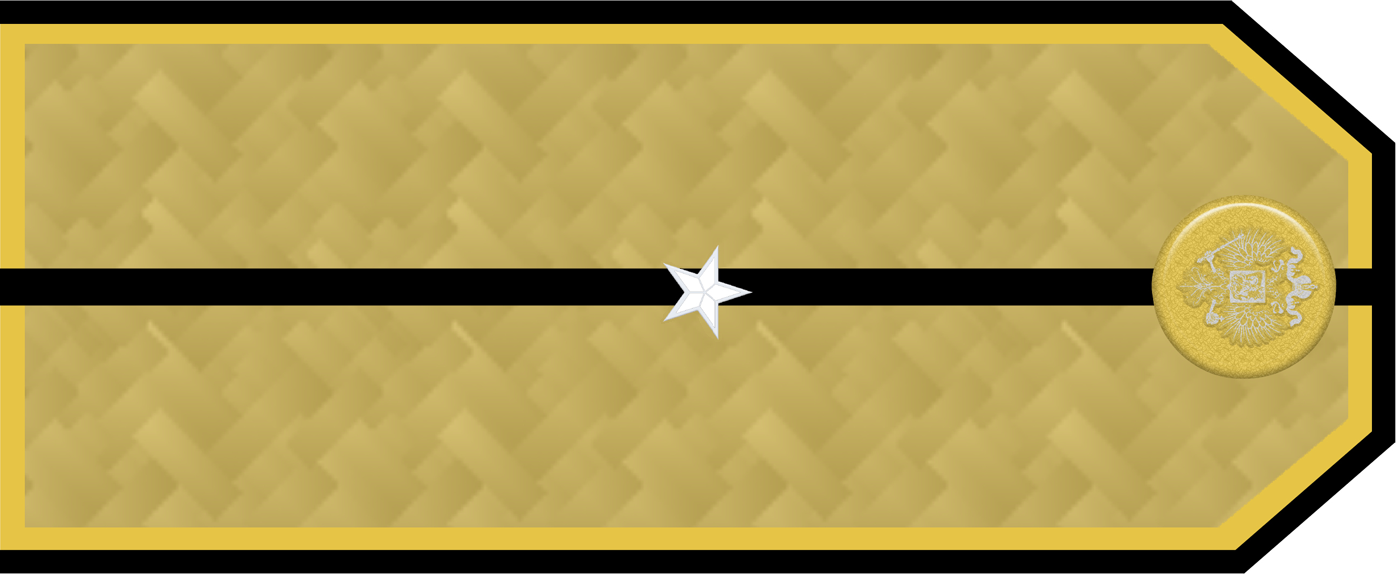
- Michman (Midshipman) - 1908
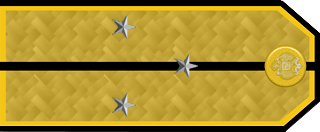
- Lejtnant (Lieutenant (junior grade)) - 1912
- Kapitan (Lieutenant) - 1919
- Komandor porucznik (Commander) - 1921
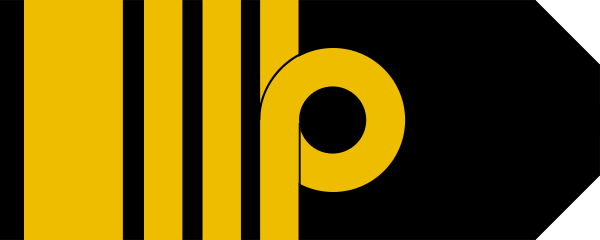
- Komandor (Captain) - 1 January 1929
- Kontradmirał (Commodore)

== Honours and awards ==
- Golden Cross of Virtuti Militari (posthumously)
- Officer's Cross of Order of Polonia Restituta (8 November 1930)
- Cross of Valour
- Golden Cross of Merit (28 November 1928)
- Commemorative Medal for the War of 1918–1921
- Medal of the Tenth Anniversary of Regained Independence
- Officer of Legion of Honour (France)
- Knight 1st Class of Order of the Sword (Sweden)
- 1914–1918 Inter-Allied Victory medal
