= List of Polish refugees cemeteries in Africa =

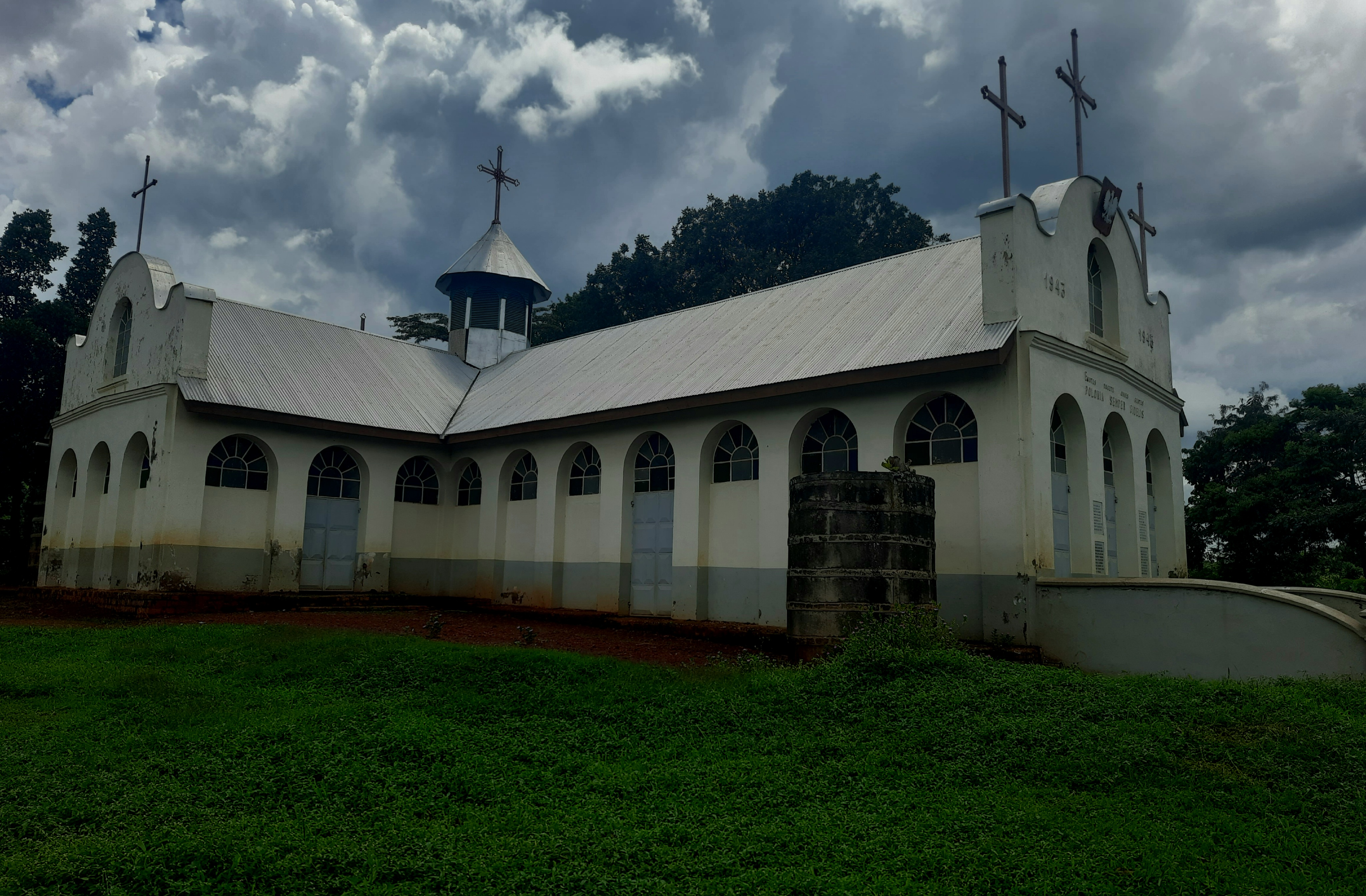
Polish camp in Uganda

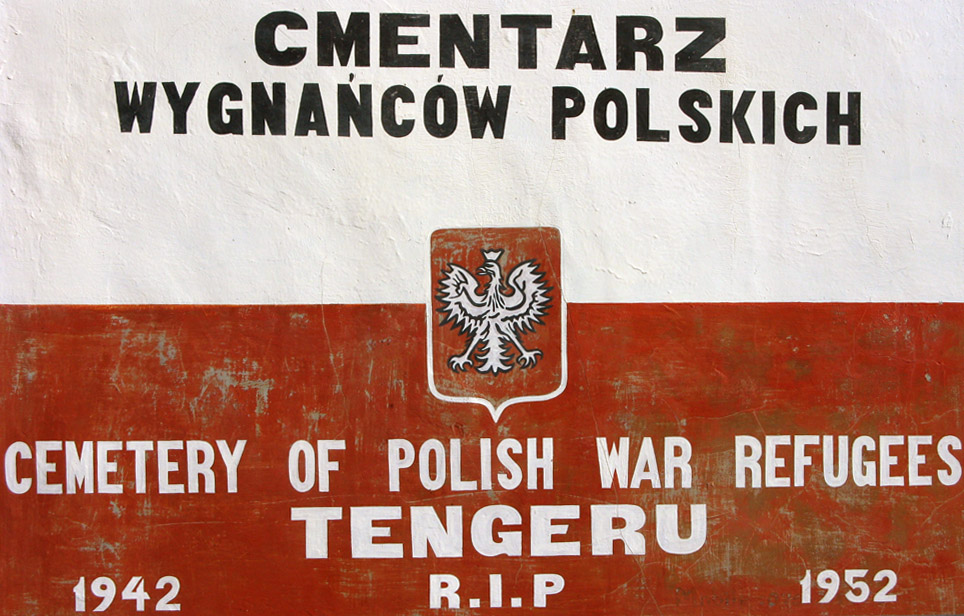
Plaque at the Cemetery of Polish War Refugees in Tengeru, Tanzania

This is a list of Polish refugees cemeteries in Africa. The list includes cemeteries of Polish refugees evacuated from the USSR in World War II.

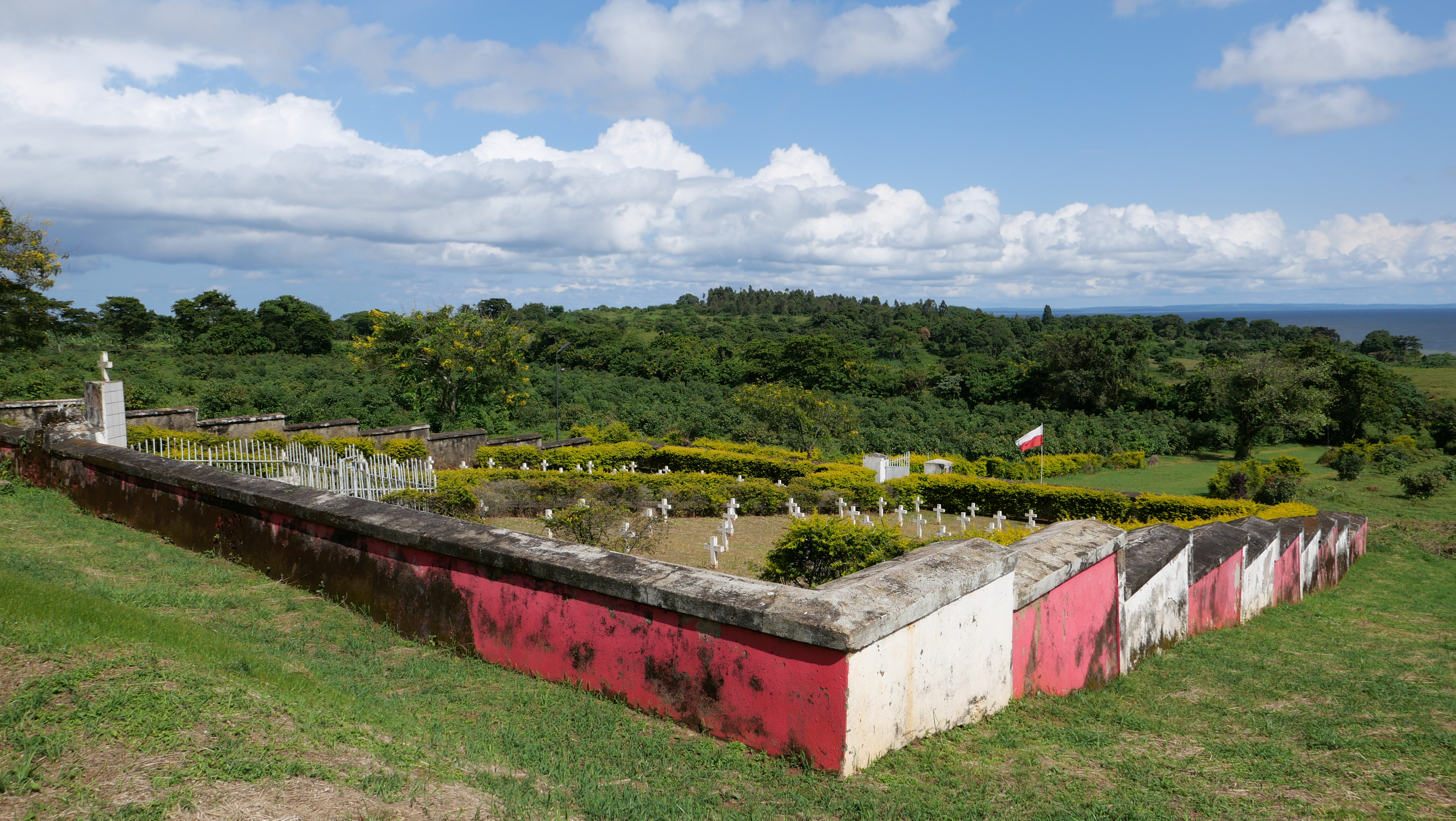
The Polish War Refugees Cemetery in Koja

== Cemeteries in Africa ==
Country	City	No. of graves	Notes
Zambia	Mbala	18	
Zambia	Bwana Mkubwa	47	
Zambia	Lusaka	70	
Tanzania	Ifunda	22	
Tanzania	Kidugala	14	
Tanzania	Morogoro	6	
Tanzania	Tengeru	148	
Uganda	Koja	98	
Uganda	Nyabyeya	51	
Uganda	Nyamegita	5	
