= Sikorski–Mayski agreement =

1941 treaty between the Soviet Union and Poland

Sikorski-Mayski Agreement
Treaty between the Republic of Poland and the U.S.S.R.
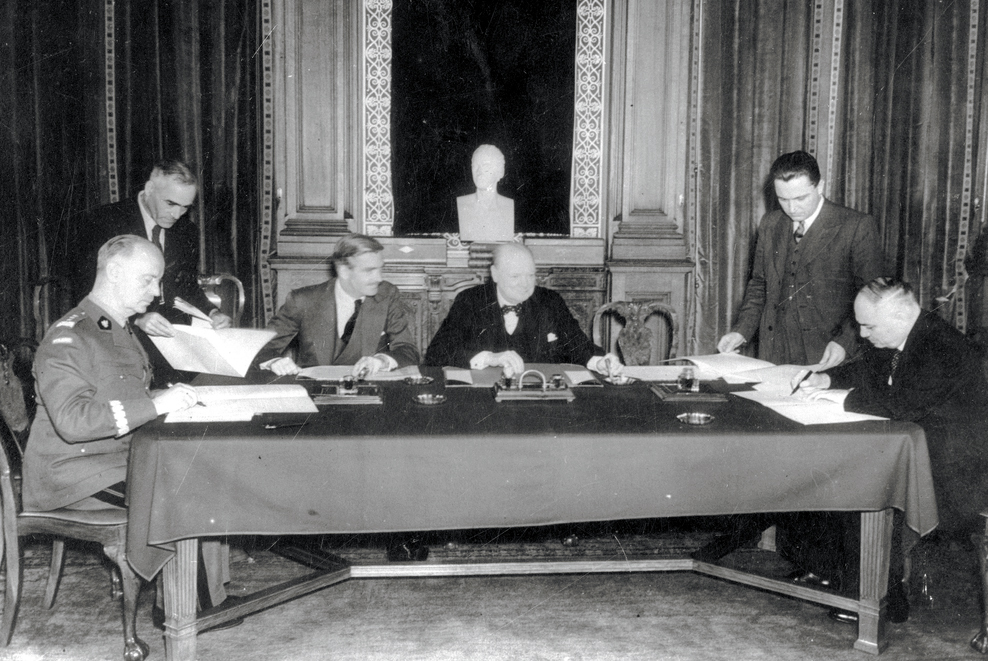
- Signing of the agreement, seated at the table from the left: Władysław Sikorski, Anthony Eden, Winston Churchill, and Ivan Maisky
- Signed: 30 July 1941; 85 years ago
- Location: London, England
- Signatories: Władysław Sikorski; Ivan Maisky
- Parties: Polish government-in-exile Soviet Union

The Sikorski–Mayski agreement was a treaty between the Soviet Union and Polish government-in-exile that was signed in London on 30 July 1941. Its name is taken from its two most notable signatories: the prime minister of Poland, Władysław Sikorski, and the Soviet ambassador to the United Kingdom, Ivan Mayski.

== Background ==
After signing the Molotov–Ribbentrop Pact in 1939, the Soviets invaded Poland and took part in its dismemberment. The Soviet authorities declared Poland to be nonexistent, and all former Polish citizens from the areas annexed by the Soviet Union were treated as Soviet citizens. That resulted in the arrest and imprisonment of approximately 2 million Polish citizens (including a quarter of a million prisoners-of-war and 1.5 million deportees) by the NKVD and other Soviet authorities.

== Negotiations ==
When the international situation changed in 1941 with Operation Barbarossa, the German invasion of the Soviet Union on 22 June 1941, the Soviet leader Joseph Stalin began to seek help from other countries opposing Nazi Germany. Strongly encouraged by British Foreign Secretary Anthony Eden, Sikorski on 5 July 1941 opened negotiations with the Soviet ambassador to London, Ivan Mayski, to re-establish diplomatic relations between Poland and the Soviet Union. Sikorski was the architect of the agreement reached by both governments that was signed on 30 July 1941. A further military alliance was signed in Moscow on 14 August 1941. Later that year, Sikorski went to Moscow with a diplomatic mission (including the future Polish ambassador to Moscow, Stanisław Kot, and the chief of the Polish Military Mission in the Soviet Union, General Zygmunt Szyszko-Bohusz).

== Provisions ==
Stalin agreed to declare all previous pacts that he had with Nazi Germany null and void, to invalidate the September 1939 partition of Poland and to release tens of thousands of Polish prisoners-of-war held in Soviet camps. Pursuant to an agreement between the Polish government-in-exile and Stalin, the Soviets granted amnesty to many Polish citizens on 12 August 1941, from whom a 40,000-strong army (Anders Army, later known as the Polish II Corps) was formed under General Władysław Anders. The whereabouts of thousands more Polish officers, however, would remain unknown for two more years and weigh heavily on subsequent Polish-Soviet relations.

== See also ==
- Territories of Poland annexed by the Soviet Union
- Polish contribution to World War II
