= Arabs in Italy =

Arabs in Italy Arabi in Italia عرب إيطاليا
Total population
- 719,545 – 801,595 (2021; foreign citizens only)

Regions with significant populations
- Lombardy; Emilia-Romagna; Piedmont; Veneto

Languages
- Arabic and Italian

Religion
- Islam and Christianity

Arabs in Italy (Italian: Arabi in Italia, Arabic: عرب إيطاليا) are Italian residents of Arab heritage.

According to the Italian National Institute of Statistics (ISTAT), most Arab non-Italian citizens residing in Italy come from North Africa, most notably from Morocco, Egypt, Tunisia and Algeria. Other notable countries of origin include Somalia, Syria, Iraq, Lebanon, Libya, Sudan, Jordan and Palestine.

== History ==
In the 9th century AD, Arabs conquered the island of Sicily and formed the Emirate of Sicily under Islamic rule. During this period, there were several attempts to invade mainland Italy, with the Emirate of Bari being one of the most notable examples.

During the subsequent Swabian rule under the Holy Roman Emperor Frederick II, who spent most of his life as king of Sicily in his court in Palermo, Moors were progressively eradicated until the massive deportation of the last Muslims of Sicily. As a result of the Arab expulsion, many towns across Sicily were left depopulated. By the 12th century, Swabian kings granted immigrants from northern Italy (particularly Piedmont, Lombardy and Liguria), Latium and Tuscany in central Italy, and French regions of Normandy, Provence and Brittany (all collectively known as Lombards.) settlement into Sicily, re-establishing the Latin element into the island, a legacy which can be seen in the many Gallo-Italic dialects and towns found in the interior and western parts of Sicily, brought by these settlers.

== Population ==
Foreigners from Arab countries in Italy according to the 2021 Census
Ancestry	Population	% of Italy population
Moroccan	428,947	0.724%
Egyptian	139,569	0.236%
Tunisian	97,407	0.164%
Algerian	18,538	0.031%
Somali	7,629	0.014%
Syrian	6,633	0.011%
Iraqi	6,035	0.009%
Lebanese	4,374	0.007%
Libyan	2,741	0.005%
Sudanese	2,382	0.004%
Jordanian	1,616	0.003%
Palestinians	1,078	0.002%
Saudi	962	<0.001%
Mauritanians	779	0.001%
Bahrain	413	<0.001%
Yemeni	308	<0.001%
Qatari	101	<0.001%
Kuwaiti	101	<0.001%
Emirati	67	<0.001%
Omani	48	<0.001%
Djibouti	26	<0.001%
Comoros	19	<0.001%
Total	719,545	1.215%

People from Arab countries who became Italian citizens between 2008 and 2020 by country of origin
Previous citizenship	Population	% of Italy population
Moroccan	249,147	0.421%
Tunisian	39,616	0.067%
Egyptian	27,510	0.046%
Algerian	11,865	0.020%
Lebanese	2,444	0.004%
Somali	1,999	0.003%
Syrian	1,993	0.003%
Jordanian	1,569	0.003%
Iraqi	827	0.001%
Sudanese	658	0.001%
Palestinians	485	<0.001%
Mauritanians	352	<0.001%
Libyan	307	<0.001%
Yemeni	66	<0.001%
Kuwaiti	31	<0.001%
Saudi	13	<0.001%
Bahrain	7	<0.001%
Djibouti	6	<0.001%
Qatari	4	<0.001%
Emirati	4	<0.001%
Comoros	3	<0.001%
Omani	1	<0.001%
Total	338,907	0.572%

Foreign-born people from Arab countries by country of birth (2021 census)
Country of birth	Population	% of Italy population
Morocco	457,002	0.771%
Egypt	137,335	0.232%
Tunisia	108,831	0.184%
Libya	32,257	0.054%
Algeria	21,404	0.036%
Somalia	10,880	0.018%
Syria	8,227	0.014%
Lebanon	8,052	0.014%
Iraq	6,872	0.012%
Sudan	3,007	0.005%
Jordan	2,969	0.005%
Saudi Arabia	1,373	0.002%
United Arab Emirates	860	0.001%
Mauritania	818	0.001%
Kuwait	710	0.001%
Yemen	397	<0.001%
Qatar	250	<0.001%
Bahrain	100	<0.001%
Palestine	83	<0.001%
Oman	81	<0.001%
Djibouti	70	<0.001%
Comoros	17	<0.001%
Total	801,595	1.353%

== See also ==
- Arab diaspora
- Arabs in Europe
- History of Islam in southern Italy
- Muslim conquest of Sicily
- Saracinesco
