= African emigrants to Italy =

Afro Italians
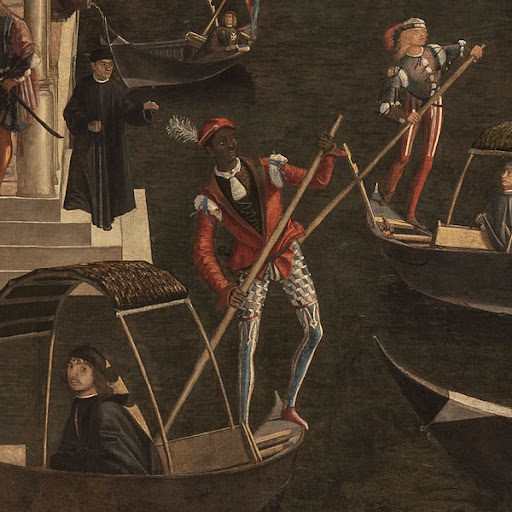

Total population
- 1,096,089 in 2015 (Of those 370,068 are Black Sub-Saharan Africans)

Regions with significant populations
- Rome, Milan, Turin, Palermo, Bologna, Brescia, Bergamo, Florence

Languages
- Italian, Afro-Asiatic languages, Niger–Congo languages, Nilo-Saharan languages

Religion
- Predominantly Roman Catholicism, also Orthodox, Other Christians · Sunni Islam

African emigrants to Italy include Italian citizens and residents originally from Africa. Immigrants from West, East and North Africa officially residing in Italy in 2015 numbered about 1,000,000 residents. Afro-Italians (Afroitaliani) are Italians born in African countries but raised in Italy, Italian citizens of African descent, or of mixed African and Italian roots.

In 2014, over 170,000 migrants arrived, which represented the biggest influx of people into one country in European Union history at the time. A large percentage of them arrived via Africa.

African migrants specifically use Libyan coasts to travel across the Mediterranean Sea in large numbers, hoping to land on Italian shores. Although departing from Libya, most are from Ghana, Senegal, Nigeria and Eritrea. According to data from the UN Refugee Agency, over 66,000 migrants arrived to Italy via sea routes in 2024. The route is dangerous and often unsuccessful; in 2024, 1,172 people died or went missing while crossing the Mediterranean and many of the other boats transporting the migrants from Africa to Italy were intercepted by the Libyan coast guard. As this route has gained more and more attention throughout the years, smugglers have started to use alternate routes such as through Egypt, the Balkan route from Greece, and a very risky route from mountain passes in Albania.

Job markets and economic opportunities represent a major driver of African immigration to Europe. However, a 2019 study also found issues pertaining to food insecurity, civil rights, and political instability significantly impacted outflow of migrants from African countries. While European legislation concerning immigration flow has focused primarily on economic draws, these socio-political factors have also been shown to have a demonstrated impact.

In 2016, Italy's finance minister pushed for financial compensation from the European Union for his country's financial losses because of mass migration. As of 2016, the European Union had put forth 1.8 billion euros for the entirety of Africa's refugee efforts in Europe.

== Countries of origin ==
=== North Africa ===
The largest group of immigrants from Africa are Arabs from North Africa, numbering 641,085 official residents in 2016. By country of origin, most of these recent arrivals are from Morocco (437,485), Egypt (109,871), Tunisia (95,645) and Algeria (71,765). Italy also has a number of immigrants from Libya (1,819), a territory where Italian expatriates had a presence during the colonial period.

=== West Africa and East Africa ===
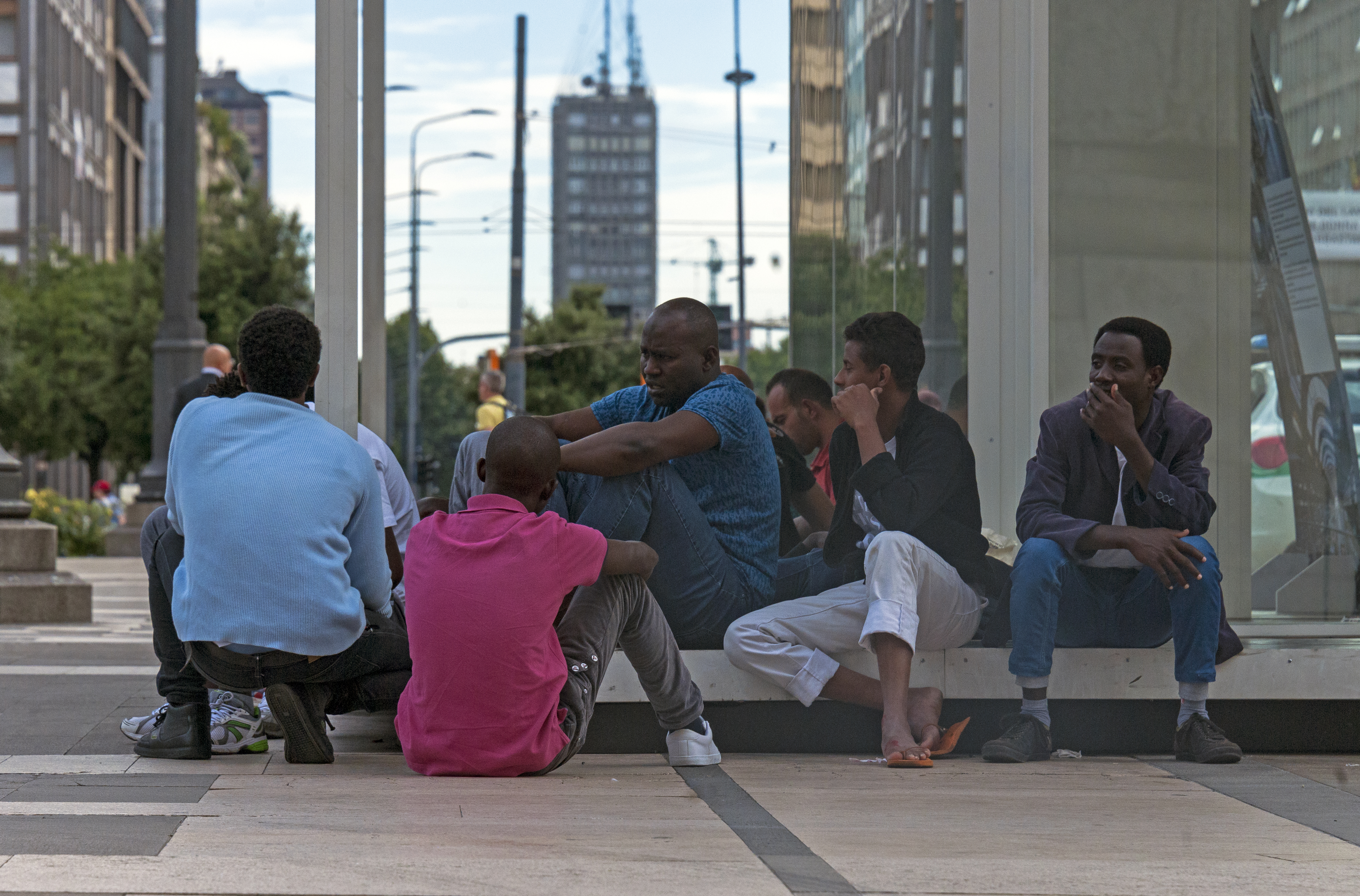
Ghanaian immigrants in Milan

Compared to Maghrebis from North Africa, the percentage of West Africans as a proportion of immigrants to Italy from Africa is 35.7% (370,068 official residents in 2015). Most come from Nigeria (98,176), Senegal (77,264) and Ghana (48,637). There are also smaller numbers from Eritrea (9,579), from Ethiopia (8,000) and from Somalia (7,903).

== Discrimination ==
African immigrants are discriminated against in Italy.

== Notable immigrants to Italy ==
The following is a list of notable people of African birth who later immigrated to Italy and resided there, either wholly or at least part time.

=== Sports ===
- Audrey Alloh - Athlete born in Côte d'Ivoire
- Zahra Bani - Javelin thrower born in Somalia
- Migidio Bourifa - Athlete born in Morocco
- Yannick Bright - Footballer born in Milan to an Ivorian father
- Paolo Dal Molin - Athlete born in Cameroon
- Mouhamet Diouf - Baskeyball player born in Senegal
- Nadia Ejjafini - Long-distance runner of Moroccan birth
- Jaco Erasmus - Rugby player born in South Africa
- Mostafa Errebbah - Long-distance runner of Moroccan birth
- Matteo Ferrari - Footballer born in Algeria
- Marcello Fiasconaro - Athlete born in South Africa
- Mario Balotelli - Footballer born in Palermo to Ghanaian immigrants
- Claudio Gentile - Footballer born in Libya
- Edwige Gwend - Judoka born in Cameroon
- Leone Jacovacci (1902–1983) - Italian boxer born in Sanza Pombo, then in the Kingdom of Kongo. Also known as: John Douglas Walker (while serving in the Bedfordshire Regiment), and Jack Walker.
- Sumbu Kalambay - Boxer born in Zaire
- Stephan El Shaarawy - Footballer born in Savona to Egyptian Father
- Christian Manfredini - Footballer born in Côte d'Ivoire
- Adam Masina - Footballer of Moroccan birth
- Nicholas Northcote - Cricket player born in South Africa
- Desmond N'Ze Kouassi - Footballer born in Ghana
- Gert Peens - Rugby player born in South Africa
- Nicola Pietrangeli - Tennis player born in Tunisia
- Jacques Riparelli - Athlete born in Cameroon
- Kelvin Yeboah - Footballer born in Ghana

=== Politicians ===
- Magdi Allam - Former member of the European Parliament (born in Egypt)
- Toni Iwobi - Former member of the Italian Senate (born in Nigeria)
- Cécile Kyenge - Former Minister of Integration and former member of the European Parliament (born in Democratic Republic of the Congo)
- Souad Sbai - Former member of the Chamber of Deputies (born in Morocco)
- Jean-Léonard Touadi - Former member of the Chamber of Deputies (born in the Republic of the Congo)
- Aboubakar Soumahoro - Member of the Chamber of Deputies (born in Ivory Coast)
- Dacia Valent - Former member of the European Parliament (born in Somalia)

=== Music ===
- Saba Anglana - singer and actress born in Somalia
- Bello FiGo - singer born in Ghana
- Franco Califano - singer born in Libya
- Nour Eddine - singer and filmmaker born in Morocco
- Laïoung, rapper and music producer, born 1992, in Brussels to Italian father and British mother of Sierra Leonean origin
- Bruno Lauzi - singer born in Eritrea
- Ma Rue or Maruego - rapper, (born 1992 in Morocco), grew up in Milan, naturalized Italian

=== Communications and other media ===
- Khaby Lame - prominent TikTokker of Senegalese background

=== Acting, television and filmmaking ===
- Elisa Kadigia Bove - actress of Italian-Somali descent
- Remo Girone - actor born in Eritrea
- Sandra Milo - actress born in Tunisia
- Claudia Cardinale - actress born in Tunisia
- Zeudi Araya - Eritrean-Italian actress
- Edwige Fenech - actress born in Algeria of Maltese father and Italian mother
- Youma Diakite - model born in Mali

=== Community activists ===
- Josephine Bakhita (c. 1869–1947), Catholic religious sister, born in Sudan; declared a saint by the Catholic Church in 2000
- Michele Amatore (1826 - 1883), born in Sudan, enslaved in childhood, later freed and established in Italy; soldier and sharpshooter in Piedmontese army, attaining rank of captain. Decorated for distinguished service in Sicily during a cholera epidemic.
- Adel Smith (1960–2014), controversial Italian anti-Christian activist. Born Emilio Smith in Alexandria, Egypt to an Italian father and an Egyptian mother; raised in Italy as a Catholic, he later converted to Islam

== See also ==
- Italian Africa
- Italians in Africa
- Black people in Ancient Roman history
- African admixture in Europe
- Somali people in Italy
- Ethiopians in Italy
- Eritreans in Italy
