= Egyptians in Italy =

Total population
- 143,000

Regions with significant populations
- Lombardy; Lazio; Piedmont

Languages
- Arabic (Egyptian Arabic), and Italian

Religion
- Majority of Sunni Islam and some Coptic Christianity or Irreligion

Related ethnic groups
- Italian Egyptians, Egyptian diaspora, Egyptians

There is a significant community of Egyptians in Italy.

== Migration history ==
As early as the 2nd century BC, there is strong evidence for an Egyptian presence in Italy, in various professions including bankers, surgeons, actors, musicians, fortune tellers, soldiers, slaves, and the like. In early modern times, after Napoleon's 1798-1801 Egypt Campaign, the degree of contact between Egypt and Europe began to increase again. In 1813, Egyptian leader Muhammad Ali sent an Egyptian mission to Italy to study printing arts.

However, the United Kingdom and France, rather than Italy, have been the preferred destinations for Egyptian expatriate academics and professionals; Italy, and especially Milan, tended to attract Egyptian businessmen and unskilled workers instead in the latter half of the 20th century. Even the exile to Italy of King Farouk of Egypt following the Egyptian Revolution of 1952 did not have much effect on Egyptian migration to Italy.

== Employment ==
Many Egyptians are employed in food-related industries, and in Milan have come to dominate traditionally Italian trades such as pizza and other baked products. Other Egyptian businesses in Milan include coffee shops, restaurants, and halal butchers.

== Religion ==
Egyptians in Italy are generally Muslim. Egyptian migrants increasingly prefer their children to maintain religious endogamy, especially in the case of their daughters. It was estimated in 2011 that there were also 20,000 to 25,000 Coptic Christians in Italy, heavily concentrated in the Milan metropolitan area.

== Notable Egyptians in Italy ==
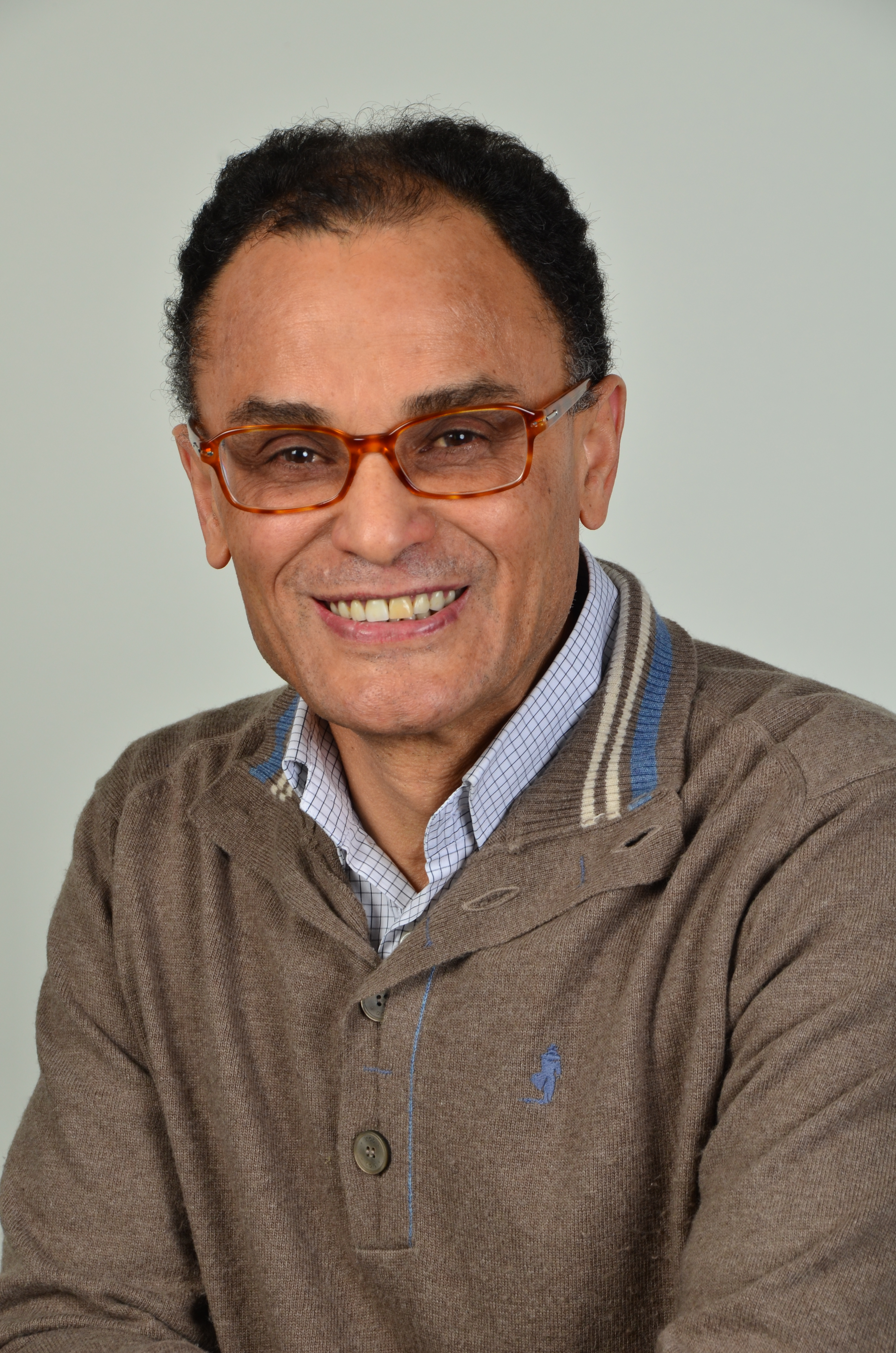
Magdi Allam

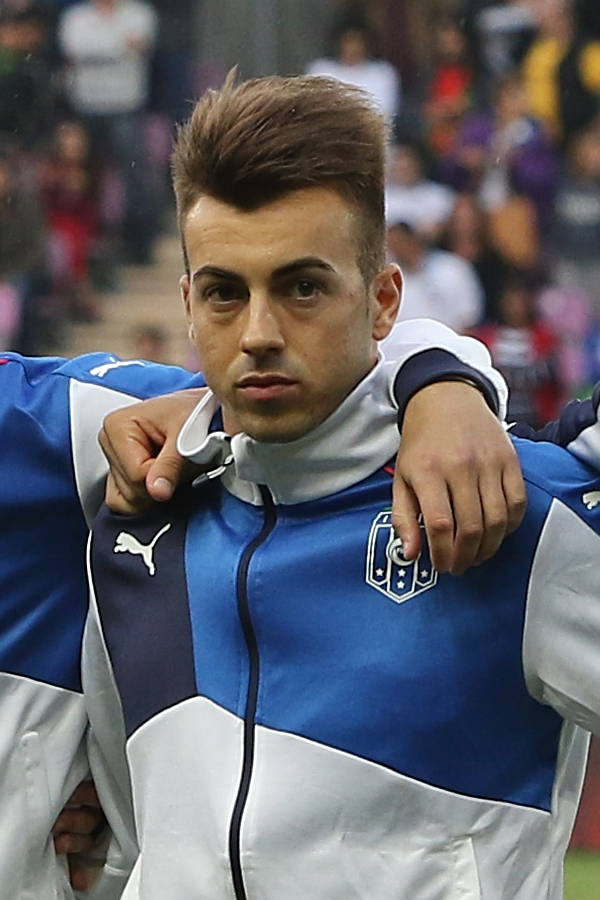
Stephan El Shaarawy

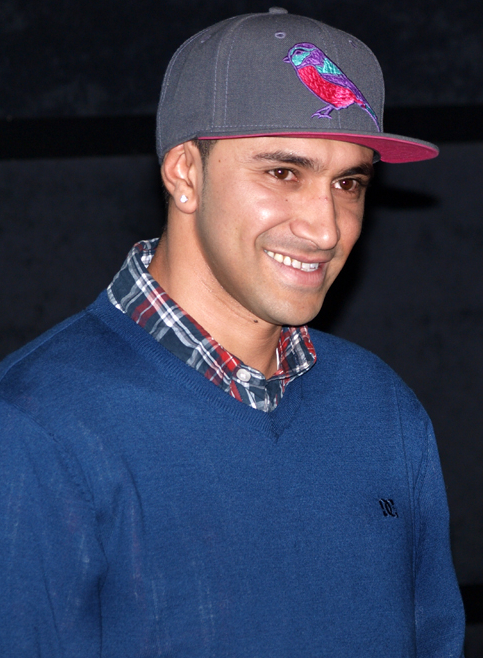
Amir Issaa

- Magdi Allam (1952), journalist and politician
- Adel Smith (1960-2014), founder of the Union of Italian Muslims
- Alessio Sakara (1981), mixed martial artist and boxer
- Omar Hassan (1987), artist
- Stephan El Shaarawy (1992), footballer
- Mahmood, singer

== See also ==
- Egypt–Italy relations
- Arabs in Europe
- Arabs in Italy
- Italian Egyptians
- Moroccans in Italy
- Algerians in Italy
- Tunisians in Italy
