= Italian Moroccans =

Moroccan citizens of Italian descent

Italo-marocchini (Italian)
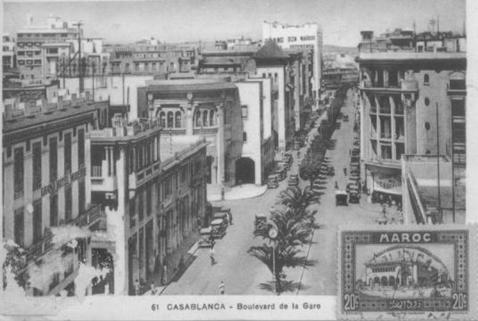
- The Italian Moroccans were concentrated in the "Maarif" district (also called "Little Italy"), near the Boulevard De la Gare in Casablanca.

Total population
- c. 1,700 (by birth) c. 30,000 (by ancestry)

Regions with significant populations
- Casablanca, Tangier and Marrakesh

Languages
- Moroccan Arabic · Italian and Italian dialects

Religion
- Roman Catholic

Related ethnic groups
- Italians, Italian Algerians, Italian Angolans, Italian Egyptians, Italian Eritreans, Italian Ethiopians, Italian Libyans, Italian Mozambicans, Italian Somalis, Italian South Africans, Italian Tunisians, Italian Zimbabweans

Italian Moroccans (Italian: italo-marocchini) are Moroccan-born citizens who are fully or partially of Italian descent, whose ancestors were Italians who emigrated to Morocco during the Italian diaspora, or Italian-born people in Morocco.

== History ==
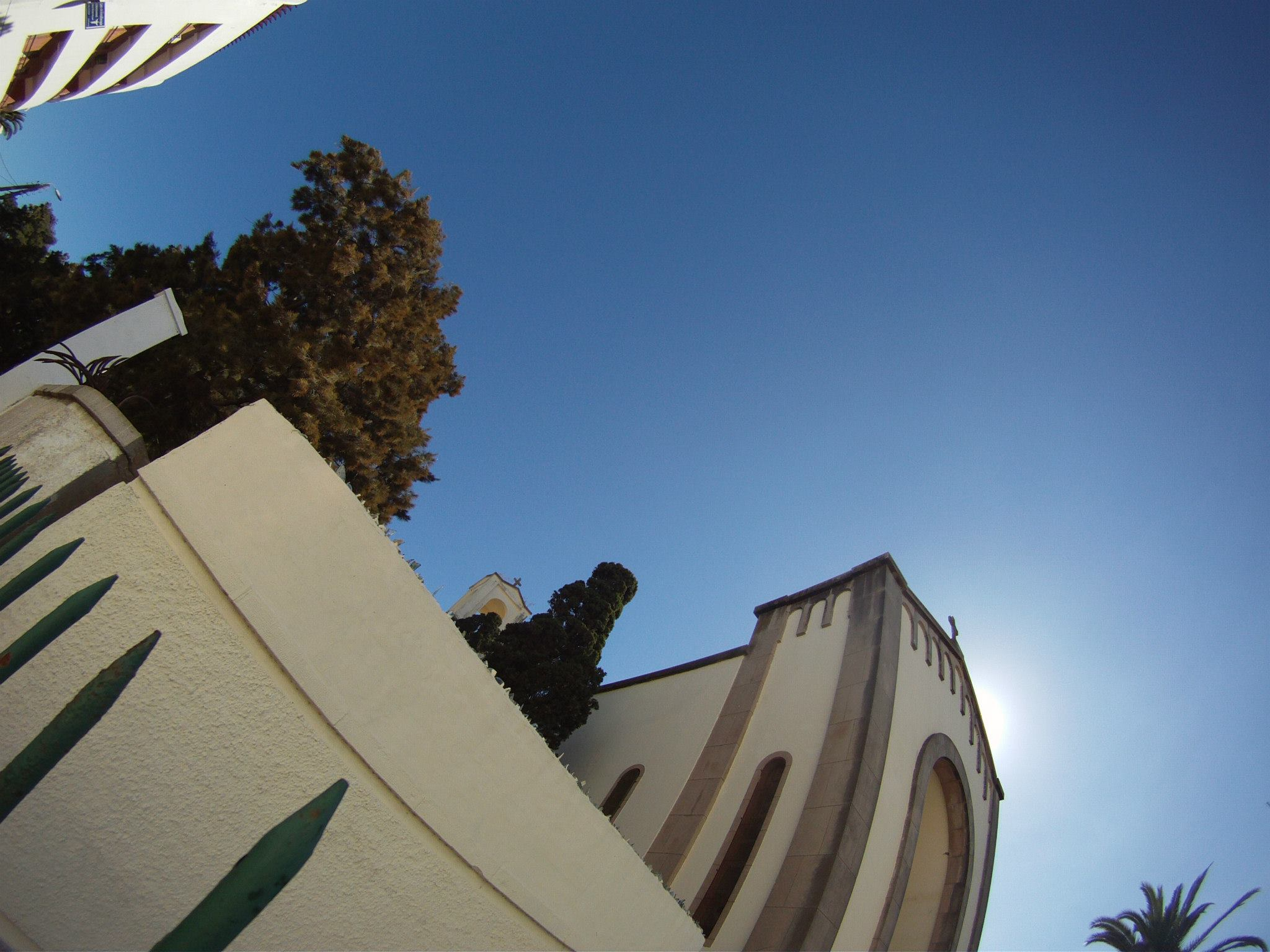
Italian Catholic church in Tangier

The first Italian presence in Morocco dates back to the times of the Italian maritime republics, when many merchants of the Republic of Venice and of the Republic of Genoa settled on the Maghreb coast. This presence lasted until the 19th century. Other economic activities that Italians took up in Morocco at the beginning of the 19th century were that of entrepreneurs in the field of transport and in the field of mail service. Due to Italian entrepreneurs, the first public service was founded in Morocco and the first regular mail service between El Jadida and Marrakesh.

In 1825, the Kingdom of Piedmont-Sardinia stipulated a commercial agreement with Morocco which facilitated contacts between the two countries, an event which led many Italian traders from this Italian state, mainly from Genoa and Sardinia, to move permanently to Morocco, where some made their fortunes. However, Italian immigration to Morocco still remained small. Commercial contacts between Morocco and Italy remained flourishing even after Italian unification, which took place in 1861. The Italians founded a white arms factory in Morocco at the official request of the African country, a request which also included the sale by the Kingdom of Italy to Morocco of a warship. The white weapons factory, opened in 1892, was managed by the Italians for 27 years, after which it was converted into a carpet factory by the French, who had recently conquered Morocco making it their own colony. Other activities in which the Italian settlers were engaged in Morocco at the end of the 19th century were in the fields of crafts, agriculture and construction.

The Italian community had a notable development in French Morocco; already in the 1913 census about 3,500 Italians were registered, almost all concentrated in Casablanca, and mostly employed as excavators and construction workers. The Italians were mainly dedicated to the trade and the Moroccan construction industry. The Italian presence in the Rif, included in Spanish Morocco, was minimal, except in Tangier, an international city, where there was an important community, as evidenced by the presence of the Italian School.

A further increase of Italian immigrants in Morocco was recorded after World War I, reaching 12,000 people, who were employed among the workers and as farmers, unskilled workers, bricklayers and operators. There was also an influx of entrepreneurs in the field of construction, metal construction, fishing, mechanical and automotive workshops, shops, as well as shops, hotels and restaurants, transport companies and shippers. In particular, most of the furniture companies and most of the pharmacies in Casablanca and Rabat were owned by Italians. Also notable was the employment of Italian settlers as peasants. The foundation of Italian institutions dates back to these years, such as the Italian language schools, including the Italian School of Casablanca and the Casa d'Italia School in Casablanca, and the opening of associations, including the Chamber of Commerce, the Circolo of the Italians and the Dante Alighieri Society.

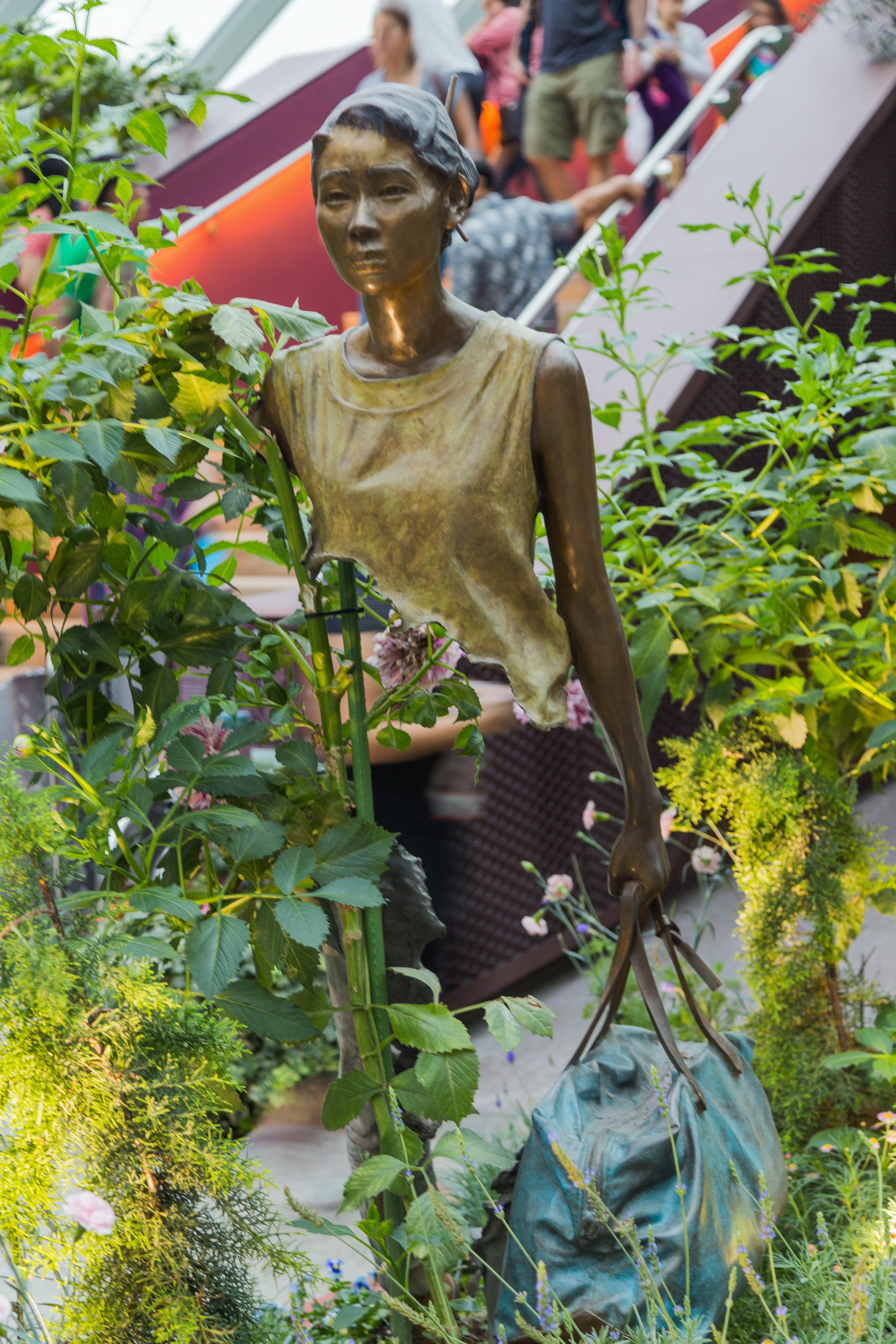
Sculpture by the Italian Moroccan Bruno Catalano in the Gardens by the Bay in Singapore

In the 1930s, Italian-Moroccans, almost all of Sicilian origin, numbered over 15,600 and lived mainly in the Maarif district of Casablanca. In those years, various works were designed and built by construction companies directed by Italians in the industrial and architectural fields, buildings, cinemas and public works such as the port of Mohammedia and the port of Casablanca. In the early 1950s, there was a small recovery of Italian emigration, which made the community grow again, down to less than 14,000 Italians in 1947, also due to the fact that many Italian-Moroccans acquired French citizenship to be able to work without issue. In 1956, the year that established Morocco's independence from France, there were about 17,500 Italian Moroccans, almost all in Casablanca.

With decolonization, most Italian Moroccans left Morocco for France and Spain. The community has started to grow again since the 1970s and 1980s with the arrival of industrial technicians, tourism and international cooperation managers, but remains very limited. A group of almost 300 Italians residing in Marrakesh since the 1990s, successfully created activities connected to the Italian and international tourism industry.

In 2007, there were 30,000 Moroccans of Italian descent, of which only a few thousand are descendants of the old settlers, while there were around 1,628 Italian citizens in Morocco. Only half of these individuals descend from the colonial-era community, given the large presence of technicians and managers of Italian firms operating in contemporary Morocco.

The Moroccan Italians belong to the Archdiocese of Rabat and their main churches are that of Anfa-Maarif, in the historic Italian quarter of Casablanca, and that of "Christ the King". The Moroccan Italians who belong to the Archdiocese of Tanger their main church is the "Italian church". There are some Italian associations in Morocco, concentrated in Casablanca but also present in Marrakesh (Circolo degli Italiani) and Tangiers (the Italian Hospital). Among the most important are the Dante Alighieri Society and the "Italian School of Casablanca".

== Notable Italian Moroccans ==
- Selim Amallah, footballer
- Bruno Catalano, sculptor
- Sofian Kiyine, footballer
- Malika El Maslouhi, fashion model
- Youssef Ben Hayoun Sadafi, actor, model and fighter

== See also ==
- Italy–Morocco relations
- Italian diaspora
- Ethnic groups in Morocco
- Moroccans in Italy

== Bibliography ==
- Favero, Luigi; Tassello, Graziano. Cent'anni di emigrazione italiana (1861 - 1961). CSER. Roma, 1981. (In Italian)
- Roberta Yasmine Catalano, Schegge di memoria. Gli italiani in Marocco. Mohammedia, Senso Unico Editions, 2009. (In Italian)
