= Tunisians in Italy =

Total population
- 130,000 (2016)

Regions with significant populations
- Emilia-Romagna; Lombardy; Sicily

Languages
- Arabic (Tunisian Arabic), French and Italian

Religion
- mainly Sunni Islam but also Irreligious and Atheism

The presence of Tunisians in Italy dates back to the 1980s.

== Numbers ==
In 2014 in Italy there were 96,012 regular immigrants from Tunisia. In 2006 there were 88,932. The three cities with most number of Tunisians are: Rome, Mazara del Vallo and Vittoria.

== Notable Tunisians in Italy ==
- Afef Jnifen (1963), model
- Ghali (1993), rapper

== See also ==
- Italy–Tunisia relations
- Arabs in Europe
- Arabs in Italy
- Egyptians in Italy
- Moroccans in Italy
- Algerians in Italy
- Italian Tunisians
