= British-Tunisians =

Tunisian diaspora in the UK

British Tunisians
Total population
- Tunisian-born residents 6,148 (2011 Census)

Regions with significant populations
- England, Scotland, Wales, Northern Ireland

Languages
- Tunisian Arabic and British English

British Tunisians are citizens or residents of the United Kingdom that are of Tunisian ancestry. British-Tunisians may also include children born in the United Kingdom to a British (or of any other origin) parent and a Tunisian parent.

== Demographics ==
The 2011 UK Census recorded 5,715 Tunisian-born residents in England, 117 in Wales, 267 in Scotland, and 49 in Northern Ireland.

== Notable British-Tunisians or Tunisians residing in the United Kingdom ==
- Wafa Zaiane, journalist at the BBC Arabic Service, London
- Hinda Hicks, singer
- Nadia Al Turki, TV journalist
- Hasna Kourda, Founder of British-Tunisian startup Save Your Wardrobe

== See also ==
- British Arabs
- The Council for Arab-British Understanding
- Tunisian diaspora
- Tunisian Americans
- Tunisian Canadians
- Tunisians in France
- Tunisian people in Italy
