= Italian Algerians =

Algerian citizens of Italian descent

Italo-algerini (Italian)
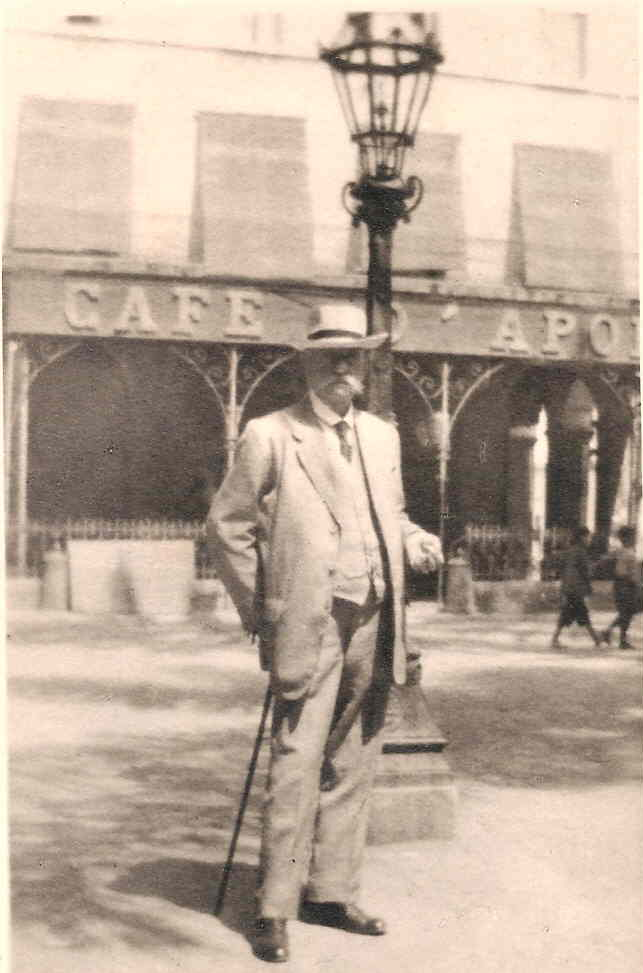
- The Italian Algerian Giacomo D'Angelis, founder of the historic Hotel D'Angelis in Algiers, 1919

Total population
- c. 700 (by birth) c. 2,000,000 (by ancestry)

Regions with significant populations
- Algeri, Constantine, Annaba and Oran

Languages
- Algerian Arabic · Italian and Italian dialects

Religion
- Roman Catholic, Islam

Related ethnic groups
- Italians, Italian Angolans, Italian Egyptians, Italian Eritreans, Italian Ethiopians, Italian Libyans, Italian Moroccans, Italian Mozambicans, Italian Somalis, Italian South Africans, Italian Tunisians, Italian Zimbabweans

Italian Algerians (Italian: italo-algerini) are Algerian-born citizens who are fully or partially of Italian descent, whose ancestors were Italians who emigrated to Algeria during the Italian diaspora, or Italian-born people in Algeria.

== History ==
The first Italian presence in Algeria dates back to the times of the Italian maritime republics, when some merchants of the Republic of Venice settled on the central Maghreb coast. The first Italians took root in Algiers and in eastern Algeria, especially in Annaba and Constantine. A small minority went to Oran, where the Spanish community had been substantial for many centuries. These first Italians (estimated at 1,000) were traders and artisans, with a small presence of peasants.

When France occupied Algeria in 1830, it counted over 1,100 Italians in its first census (done in 1833), concentrated in Algiers and in Annaba. With the arrival of the French, the migratory flow from Italy grew considerably: in 1836 the Italians had grown to 1,800, to 8,100 in 1846, to 9,000 in 1855, to 12,000 in 1864 and to 16,500 in 1866. Italians were an important community among foreigners in Algeria. Annaba was one of the major settlement centers of Italians in Algeria. Between 1850 and 1880, an Italian community of coral fishermen settled there from Liguria, Tuscany and Campania. Other jobs that the Italians carried out in Algeria were fishermen, laborers, bricklayers, miners, marble workers, tailors, stonemasons, carpenters and shoemakers.

In 1889, French citizenship was granted to foreign residents, mostly settlers from Spain or Italy, so as to unify all European settlers (pieds-noirs) in the political consensus for an "Algérie française". The French wanted to increase the European numerical presence in the recently conquered Algeria, and at the same time limit and prevent the aspirations of Italian colonialism in neighboring Tunisia and possibly also in Algeria. As a consequence, the Italian community in Algeria began to decline, going from 44,000 in 1886, to 39,000 in 1891 and to 35,000 in 1896.

In the 1906 census, 12,000 Italians in Algeria were registered as naturalized Frenchmen, demonstrating a very different attitude from that of the Italian Tunisians, much more sensitive to the irredentist bond with the motherland. After World War I, Italian Algerians stabilized at around 30–35,000 people. Fascism also made very few converts in Algeria. At the turn of the 19th and 20th centuries, Algeria experienced a building boom, and the masons were almost all Italian. Many of them later became entrepreneurs in the construction field. The Italians were also the majority among the miners and among the workers who worked on the construction of roads and railways.

Also noteworthy were the Italian peasants who made the land left uncultivated by the French colonists productive again, who decided to devote themselves to other productive activities. At the beginning of the 20th century there was the opening of Italian-speaking scholastic, health and cultural institutions, In particular, in 1927, there were three private elementary schools, eight mutual aid institutes, two centers for the diffusion of culture Italian and an economic association. Italian language courses were also common. There were also three offices of the Dante Alighieri Society.

After World War II, Italian Algerians followed the fate of the French pieds-noirs, especially in the years of the Algerian War, repatriating massively to Italy. Still in the 1960s, immediately after Algeria's independence from France, the Italian community had a consistency of about 18,000 people, almost all residing in the capital, a number that dropped to 500-600 people in a short time.

In 2012, there were 2,000 Algerians of Italian descent, of which only a few hundred are descendants of the old settlers, while there were around 699 Italian citizens in Algeria. The few members of the Italian community remaining in Algiers have a school (entitled "Roma") and a club at their disposal.

== Notable Italian Algerians ==
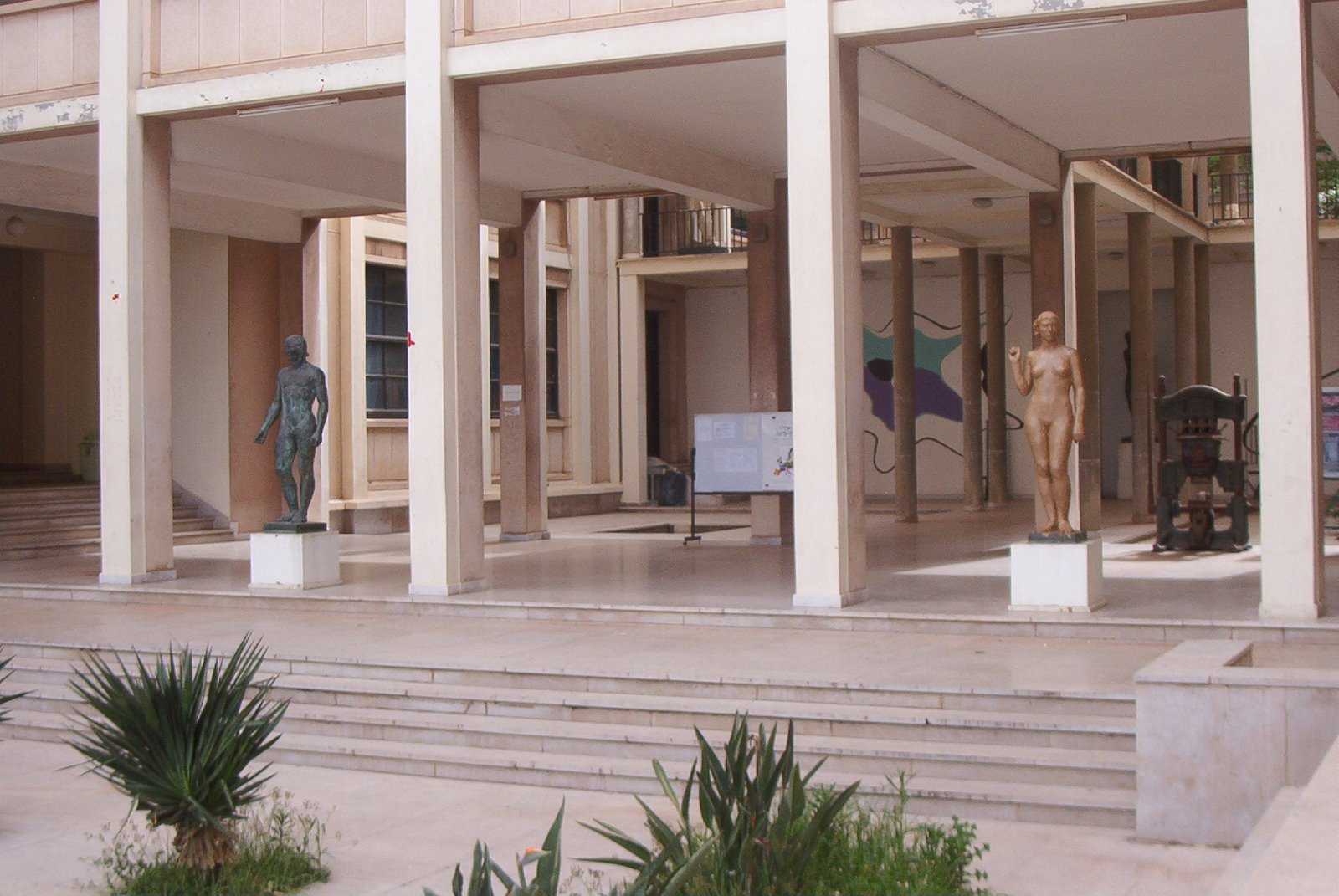
Statues of the Italian Algerian Paul Belmondo at the Algiers School of Fine Arts

- Paul Belmondo, sculptor
- Ali Bitchin, pirate
- Liassine Cadamuro, footballer
- Hasan Agha, governor
- Hassan Veneziano, regent of Algiers
- Reda Kateb, actor
- Medhi Lacen, footballer
- Florian Makhedjouf, footballer
- Maxime Spano, footballer

== See also ==
- Algeria–Italy relations
- Italian diaspora
- Ethnic groups in Algeria
- Algerians in Italy

== Bibliography ==
- Favero, Luigi; Tassello, Graziano. Cent'anni di emigrazione italiana (1861 - 1961). CSER. Roma, 1981. (In Italian)
- Foerster, Robert Franz. The Italian Emigration of Our Times. Ayer Publishing. New York, 1969. ISBN 0405005229
- Marchi, Pietro. Spugne e coralli. Treves editoriale. Firenze, 1870. (In Italian)
- Priestley, Herbert. France Overseas: Study of Modern Imperialism. Routledge. Kentucky, 1967. ISBN 0714610240
