= Moroccans in Italy =

Total population
- 420,650 (2017) increase of new 22,000 citizens from Morocco only in 2023

Regions with significant populations
- Lombardy · Piedmont · Emilia-Romagna

Languages
- Arabic (Moroccan Arabic), Berber, French and Italian

Religion
- Mainly Sunni Islam, Minority:Christianity, Judaism and Irreligion

There is a large population of Moroccans in Italy. are Italians citizens and nationals ethnic group, of the Italy with Italian citizenship and an Italian passport of Moroccan descent, immigrants from Morocco to Italy and their descendants are the third largest ethnic group in Italy after Romanians in Italy and Albanians in Italy. who come from various ethnic groups, form a distinct community in Italy and part of the wider Moroccan diaspora. They are widely referred to as Italiano-Marocchini in Italian. According to the Italian National Institute of Statistics, the country was home to 420,650 Moroccan immigrants in 2017. The equivalent figure in 2014 was 454,773, indicating a decrease.

== Geographical distribution ==
Based on Demo Istat statistics.

- Turin 17,253
- Milan 7,861
- Rome 5,210
- Genoa 4,213
- Bologna 3,927
- Modena 2,977
- Reggio Emilia 2,547

== Religion ==
In the years 2011 and 2012 the ISTAT made a survey regarding the religious affiliation among the immigrants in Italy, the religion of the Moroccan people in Italy were as follows:

- Muslims: 99.0%
- Christianity: 0.3%
- Non religious: 0.5%
- Other religions: 0.3%

== Notable people ==
- Elijah Benamozegh (1823-1900), rabbi
- Souad Sbai (1961), politician
- Mostafa Errebbah (1971), long-distance runner
- Nadia Ejjafini (1977), long-distance runner
- Malika Ayane (1984), singer
- Joseph Lasiri (1991), Muay Thai fighter List of ONE Championship champions#ONE Strawweight Muay Thai World Champion
- Adam Masina (1994), footballer
- Walid Cheddira (1998), footballer
- Hachim Mastour (1998), footballer
- Shady Oukhadda (1999), footballer
- Nadia Battocletti (2000), athlete

== See also ==
- Italy–Morocco relations
- Arabs in Europe
- Arabs in Italy
- Egyptians in Italy
- Algerians in Italy
