= Algeria–Italy relations =

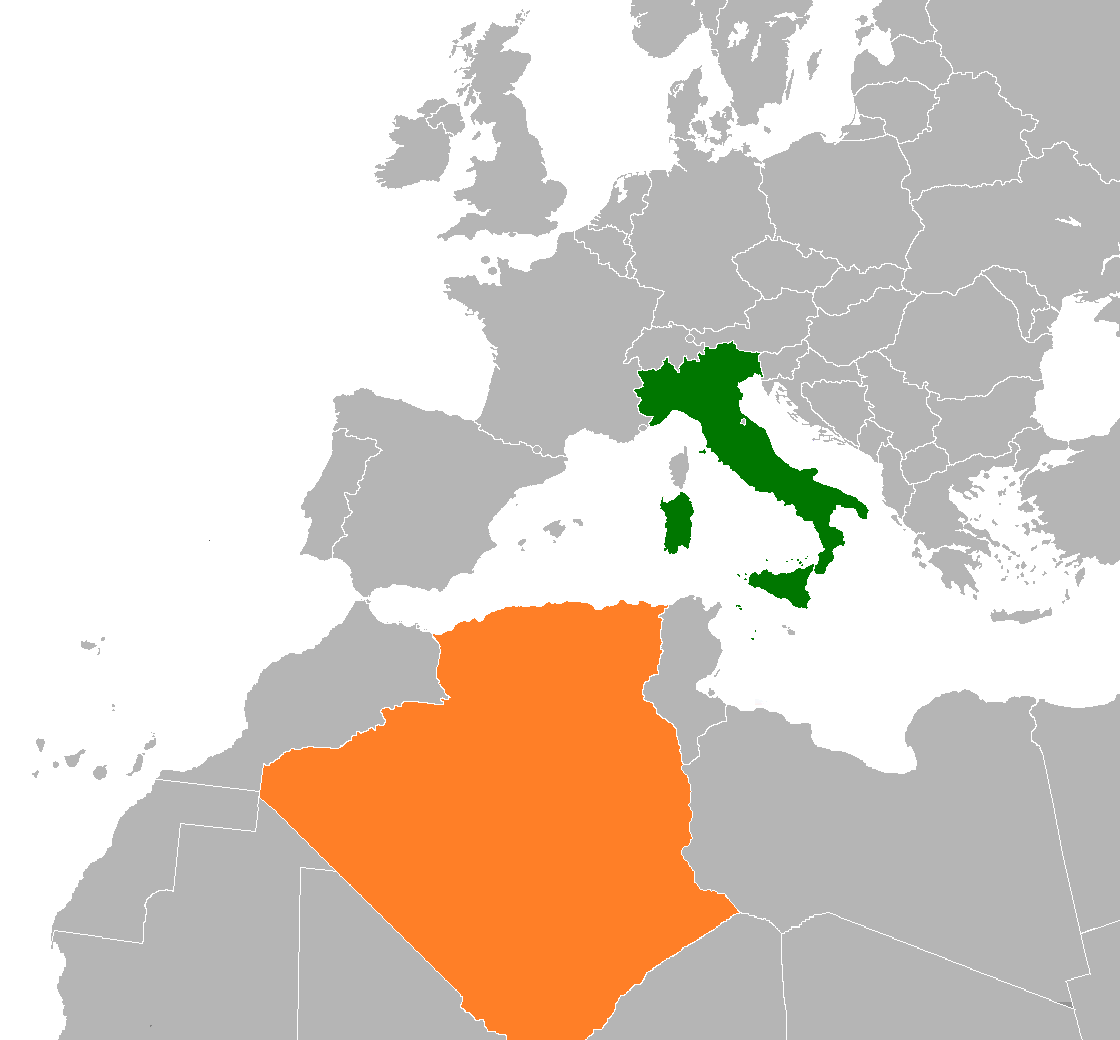
- Algeria: Italy

Diplomatic mission
- Embassy of Algeria, Rome: Embassy of Italy, Algiers

Algeria and Italy have a connection. The northern part of Algeria today was formerly the territory of the Roman Empire, which was originally from modern-day Italy. Some historical sites like the Djémila and Tipasa, two ancient Roman heritages that are now UNESCO World Heritage Sites. The southern Italian island of Sicily was in turn ruled by the North African Muslims after they conquered it in the 9th century. Due to historical legacies, Italy and Algeria's relations are viewed as important for stability in the region.

Algeria has an embassy in Rome. Italy has an embassy in Algiers. Two nations are members of the Union for the Mediterranean.

== History ==
After the Roman Empire annexed Carthage, which also ruled northern Algeria, the Roman administration developed a strong cultural establishment within Algeria, that remains heavily in Algeria today.

During the French conquest of Algeria, Italo-French settlers had arrived as part of French colonial domination in Algeria that later formed the Pied-Noirs, and they had developed a significant cultural impact on Algerian society. They were forced to leave upon the independence of Algeria in 1962.

== Modern relations ==
Italy has been a strong supporter of Algeria's stability following a decade of civil conflict in Algeria, and provided intelligence for the Algerian Government battling the Islamists.

In 2014, during a visit to Algiers, the Italian Prime Minister Matteo Renzi called the relationship between Italy and Algeria "very important and strategic".

Italy and Algeria have been working to deepen the tie between two states, notably economic and energy cooperations. On 28 February 2022, Italian Minister of Foreign Affairs Luigi Di Maio met with Algerian President Abdelmadjid Tebboune, the Minister of Foreign Affairs Ramtane Lamamra and Minister of Energy Mohamed Arkab during a visit to Algeria. They held talks about increasing the quantities of Algerian gas to Europe after the Russian invasion of Ukraine. On 26 May 2022, during a state visit to Rome, Tebboune agreed to increase gas supply for Italy and Europe after the Russian invasion of Ukraine. On 18 July 2022, Tebboune and Italian Prime Minister Mario Draghi signed an energy contract worth €4 billion for additional gas supply to Italy in Algiers, making Algeria Italy's biggest gas supplier.

== Algerian Embassy ==
The Algerian embassy is located in Rome.

- Ambassador Touahria Abdelkrim

== Italian Embassy ==
The Italian embassy is located in Algiers.

- Ambassador Giovanni Pugliese

== See also ==
- Foreign relations of Algeria
- Foreign relations of Italy
- Algerians in Italy
- Italian Algerians
- The Battle of Algiers, 1966 Italo-Algerian movie
