= Italy–Morocco relations =

Bilateral relations between Morocco and Italy

- Italy: Morocco

Diplomatic mission
- Embassy of Italy, Rabat: Embassy of Morocco, Rome

Since the late 19th century, relations between Morocco and Italy have been marked by friendship and mutual cooperation. The first diplomatic mission was sent during the reign of Sultan Moulay Hassan I to King Vittorio Emanuele II of Italy in 1879. Both countries are members of the United Nations and the Union for the Mediterranean.

== Economic relations ==
Morocco considers Italy a key trading partner, although the economic relationship between the two countries has not yet reached a level commensurate with their standings. According to the Italian Institute of Statistics (ISTAT), the volume of trade between Morocco and Italy reached €1.993 billion between January and November 2013, compared to €1.797 billion during the same period in 2012, representing a growth rate of 10.9%. This figure is modest when compared to Spain's exports to Morocco, which amounted to €5.508 billion. Spain has become Morocco's top supplier with a market share of 13.1%, while Italy fell to the eighth position with a share of 4.6%. Key Moroccan imports from Italy include refined petroleum products, industrial, agricultural, and medical machinery and equipment, as well as electrical devices, cars, and chemical and plastic products.

== Driving license agreement ==
In March 2024, the governments of Morocco and Italy signed an agreement in Rome for the mutual recognition of driving licenses for the purpose of exchanging them. The agreement was signed by Mr. Youssef Balla, Morocco's ambassador to Italy, and Mr. Matteo Salvini, Deputy Prime Minister and Minister of Infrastructure and Transport, in the presence of the Deputy Minister in charge of maritime transport. This agreement aims to remove obstacles faced by Moroccans residing in Italy when exchanging new generation driving licenses with Italian registration services.

== Trade exchanges ==
Morocco exports various fishery and agricultural products and leather goods. As for the nature and volume of Italian investments in Morocco, their value reached €500 million. Italy has had a significant role in major projects, including the construction of dams, highways, and other infrastructure, industrial, and service sector projects. There are also branches of major Italian companies in Morocco. Due to the economic crisis, around 100 small and medium-sized Italian companies have entered the Moroccan market in the past three years, seeking new markets and opportunities to showcase their expertise.

== Security cooperation ==
To strengthen security cooperation amidst increasing regional and international security challenges, Morocco and Italy aim to exchange information and expertise, coordinate efforts to combat organized crime and terrorism, and ensure security and stability in both countries. On June 3, 2024, Abdelatif Hammouchi, Director General of National Security and Territorial Surveillance, received Vittorio Pisani, Director General of the Italian National Police, in Rabat. This visit was part of an official trip to Morocco by a significant Italian security delegation.

== Moroccans in Italy ==
According to a 2013 census, Moroccans constitute the second-largest foreign community in Italy, with over 517,000 residents, including 300,000 workers and 106,000 students in Italian schools and secondary institutions.

Statistics from the Bank of Italy revealed that remittances by Moroccan migrants to Morocco saw a significant increase of around 15% in recent years. In 2017, these remittances amounted to €277.157 million, confirming an upward trend that has gradually returned to levels seen approximately a decade ago. After exceeding €333 million, remittances fell to €240 million in 2013.

== Resident diplomatic missions ==
- Italy has an embassy in Rabat and a consulate-general in Casablanca.
- Morocco has an embassy in Rome and consulates-general in Bologna, Milan, Naples, Palermo, Turin and Verona.

== See also ==
- Foreign relations of Italy
- Foreign relations of Morocco
- Moroccans in Italy
- Italian Moroccans
