= Tunisia–European Union relations =

EU–Tunisia relations
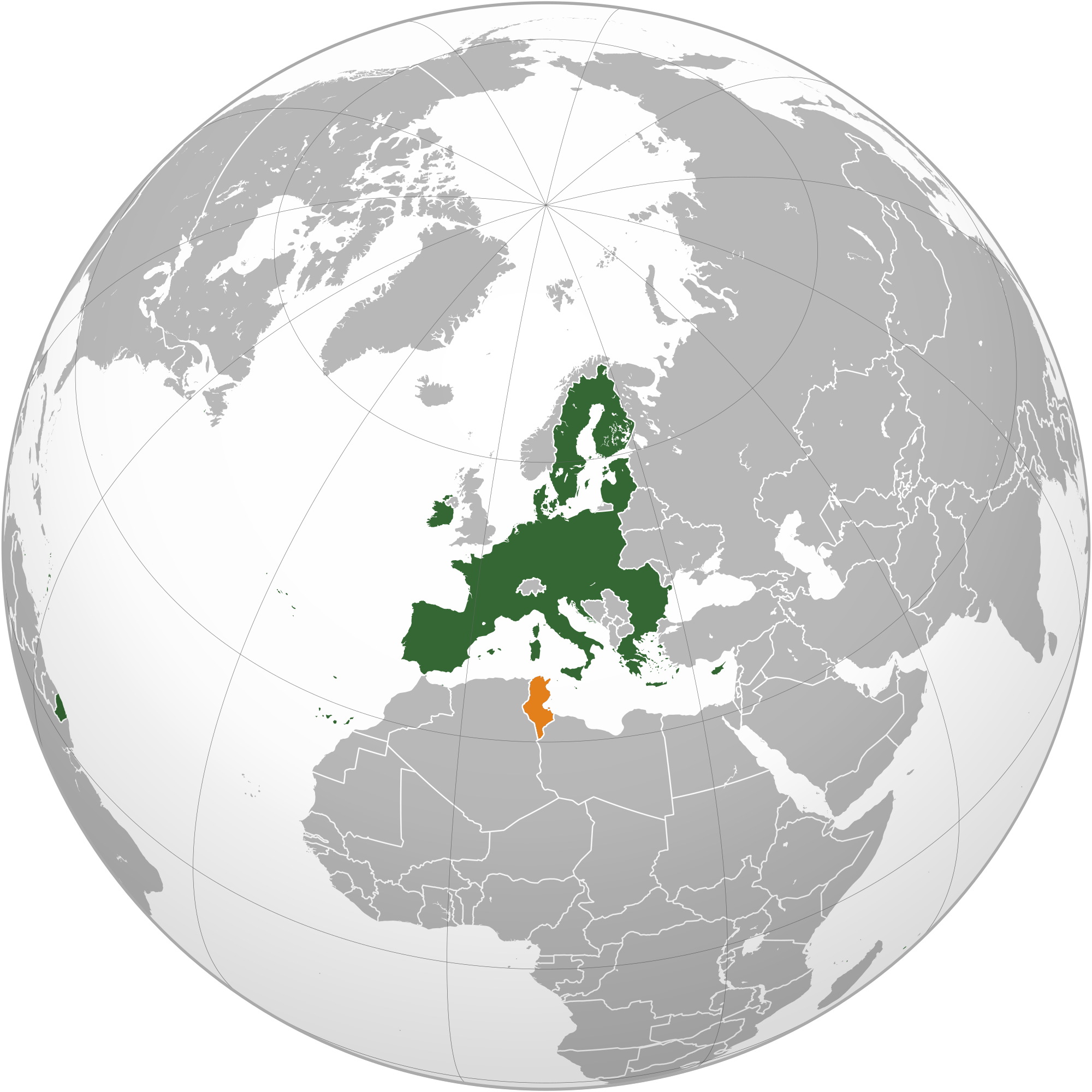
- European Union: Tunisia

Tunisia–European Union relations are the foreign relations between the country of Tunisia and the European Union.

== Trade ==
The EU is Tunisia's largest trading partner. More than 75% of Tunisia's exports go to the EU and more than half of Tunisia's imports come from the EU. The total trade in goods between the EU and Tunisia in 2017 amounted to €20.5 billion.

== Funding and Assistance ==
Tunisia receives some of the largest amount of money from the European Neighborhood Instrument out of all the participating countries with a "focus on different sectors such as the economy and the business environment; education, training and research; culture and media; migration and asylum; justice, freedom and security; environment, climate change and energy.". In addition to funding for migrant relief, Tunisia benefits from several other EU funding projects such as the European Instrument for Democracy and Human Rights, Instrument contributing to Stability and Peace, and the Development Cooperation Instrument (DCI). Tunisia is also a member of the Erasmus+ program and an associate member of Horizon 2020. Flows of foreign direct investment to Tunisia are also concentrated on the development of the infrastructure network as well as of the textiles and clothing sectors.

In July 2023, Tunisia and the European Union signed a memorandum of understanding to boost economic partnership and reduce immigration from Tunisia to Europe. In September it was announced that as part of the agreement a payment of 127 million euros would be disbursed to Tunisia. A month later however, Tunisia returned 60 million euros back to the EU due to disagreements over the deal.

The European Commission is withholding findings from a human rights inquiry into Tunisia, raising concerns over transparency in relation to a controversial EU-Tunisia migration deal amid ongoing reports of abuses against migrants.

== Chronology of relations with the EU ==
Timeline
Date	Event
1976	The European Economic Community formally starts working diplomatic relations with Tunisia.
1995	An Association Agreement is signed between the EU and Tunisia.
14 July 1998	The first meeting of the EU-Tunisia Association Council is held.
2012	A Privileged Partnership is established following the aftermath of the Tunisian Revolution. Since 2011, EU assistance to Tunisia has increased dramatically.
3 March 2014	The EU and Tunisia establish a Mobility Partnership in response to the migrant crisis, including "simplifying procedures for granting visas".
13 October 2015	Negotiations for a Deep and Comprehensive Free Trade Area (DCFTA) between the EU and Tunisia begin.
29 September 2016	The EU issues a Joint Communication Strengthening EU support for Tunisia.
1 December 2016	The European Union and Tunisia launch the EU-Tunisia Youth Partnership.
16 July 2023	The EU and Tunisia sign a Memorandum of Understanding on a strategic and global partnership.

== Tunisia's foreign relations with EU member states ==
- Austria
- Belgium
- Bulgaria
- Croatia
- Cyprus
- Czech Republic
- Denmark
- Estonia
- Finland
- France
- Germany
- Greece
- Hungary
- (Republic of Ireland) Ireland
- Italy
- Latvia
- Lithuania
- Luxembourg
- Malta
- Netherlands
- Poland
- Portugal
- Romania
- Slovakia
- Slovenia
- Spain
- Sweden

== See also ==
- Foreign relations of the European Union
- Foreign relations of Tunisia
