= Spain–Tunisia relations =

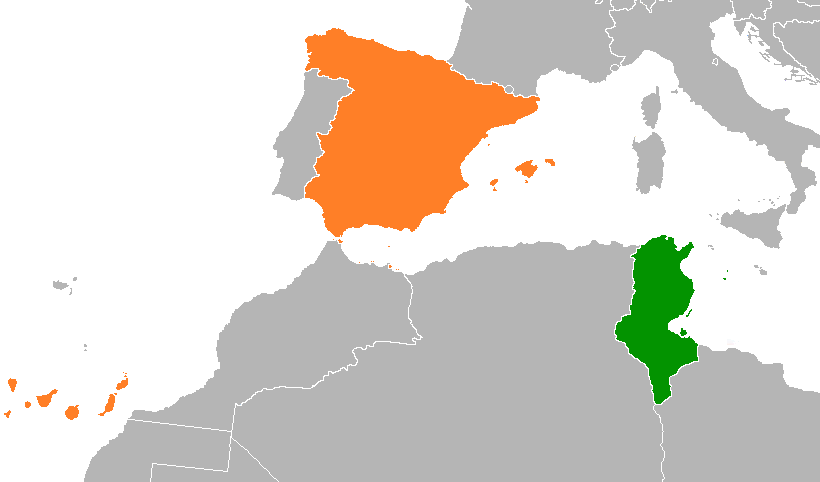
- Tunisia: Spain

Spain–Tunisia relations are the bilateral relations between Spain and Tunisia. Tunisia has an embassy in Madrid and two consulates in Barcelona and Palma de Mallorca. Spain has an embassy in Tunisia. Both countries are members of the Union for the Mediterranean.

== History ==
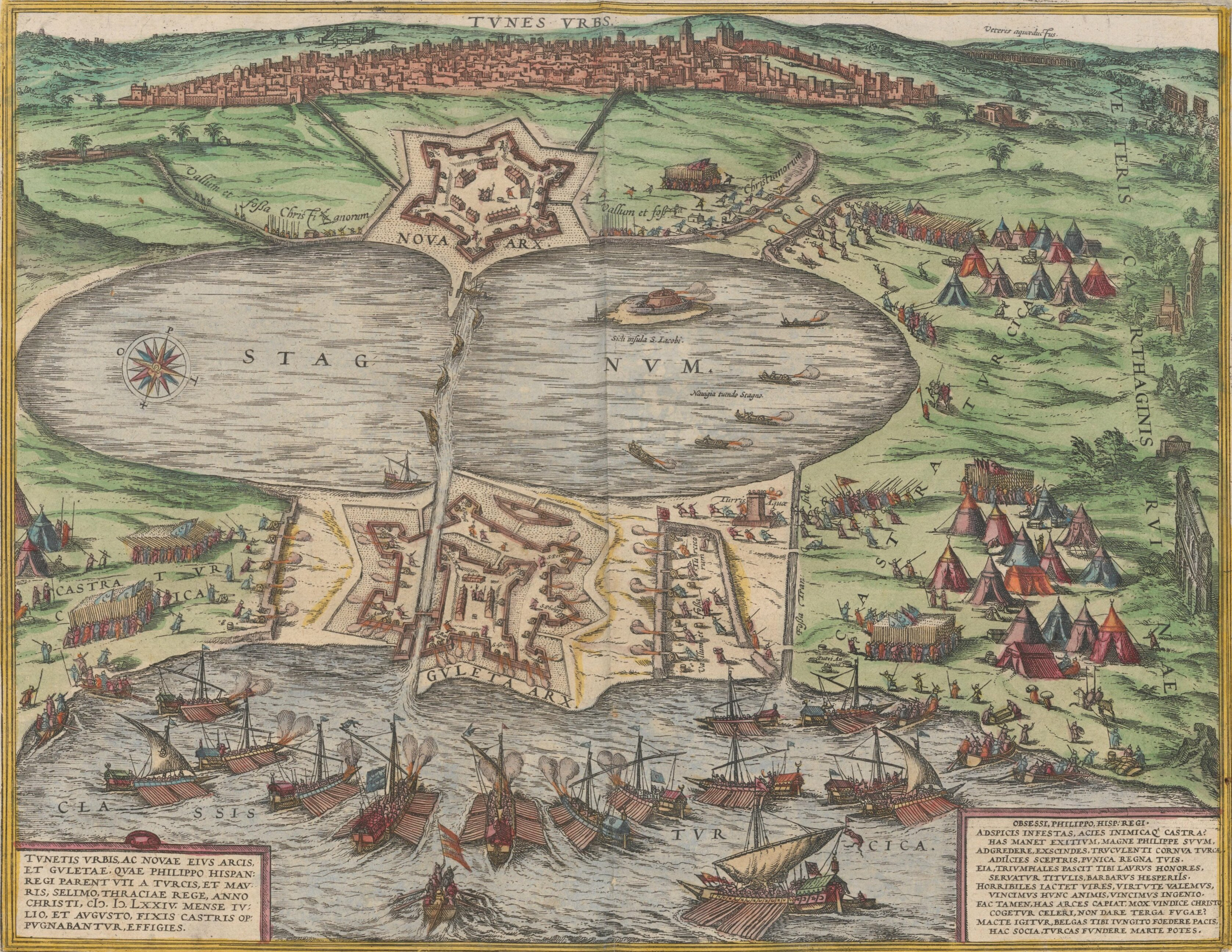
Ottoman conquest of Tunis, 1574.

Prior to the Ottoman conquest of Tunis in 1574, the Hafsid kingdom (occupying a territory similar to current-day Tunisia) had become a protectorate of the Hispanic Monarchy in the mid 16th century for few years. With an Andalusi presence in the territory of current-day Tunisia since at least the 13th century, after 1609 Tunis received a quite important influx of expelled Moriscos (about 80,000) from Castile and Aragon. Uthman Dey made things easy for them, and they were provided with instructors in the Arab language and the Islamic religion. The exiled Moriscos revitalised the economy and renewed the Tunisian cultural life.

The Bourbon-ruled Kingdom of Spain and the Husainid-ruled Regency of Tunis signed as Treaty of Peace and Commerce in 1791.

In 1957, a year after the independence of Tunisia and despite relatively faint previous relations earlier in the 20th-century caused by the French influence in the Maghreb and the Socialist leanings of the pro-independence Neo Destour party (as well as the at times rocky Tunisian relation with a prime Arab ally of Spain, Egypt), Spanish dictator Francisco Franco received Tunisian president Habib Bourguiba with the highest honours. Both leaders tried to sustain a friendly bilateral relations for the rest of their rules.

In 2011, Spanish PM José Luis Rodríguez Zapatero became the first foreign leader to visit Tunisia following the Tunisian revolution. Zapatero announced Spain would send further humanitarian aid, help Tunisia control the influx of people coming from Libya, and declared that Spain would back international economic aid to help Tunisia recover from financial turmoil. In March 2012, Tunisia visited the Minister of Foreign Affairs and Cooperation, José Manuel García-Margallo. In June 2014 he made a new visit and SEAEX made another visit in April 2015. Good political harmony is based on common priorities and perceptions on various agendas: stability and security in the Mediterranean. The Treaty of Friendship, Good Neighborhood and Cooperation (signed in 1995 and ratified in 1996), was the first one that Tunisia signed with a European Union country. The good image that Spain enjoys in Tunisia is due to historical reasons (the "Andalusians", as the Moors who settled in these lands are designated here, contributed knowledge and wealth and remain a sign of distinction), of geographical proximity and tuning of strategic interests, as well as of tourist exchanges.

== Economic relations ==
Trade between the two countries, although they have shown an increase in the last four years, are far from those of the main European competitors in Spain, which are France, Italy and (Germany) . In 2013, Spanish exports to Tunisia were €905 million, with a 9% decrease compared to the previous year. Imports decreased 2.6% to €560 million. The coverage rate was 162%.

In 2014, Spain was the seventh supplier, with a market share of 4.1%; and fifth customer, with a 3.5% share. With regard to the exchanges of Tunisia with the EU, it ranks fourth in relation to the other countries in both categories (Source: National Institute of Statistics of Tunisia).

In 2014, Spanish exports to Tunisia were €911.7 million, with a slight increase of 0.7% compared to the previous year. Imports, meanwhile, decreased 27.5%, reaching a value of €405.7 million. The coverage rate was 224.7%.

On the export side, the following stand out: fuels and petroleum oils (23%); automobiles and automotive components (8%); cereals, especially wheat (5.5%); clothing fabrics (4.4%); electrical equipment (4%); steel products and their manufactures (3.9%).

Among the imports were: fuels and lubricants (18.4%); female clothing (15.8%); frozen molluscs and crustaceans (9%); male clothing (7.6%); intimate-bathroom fashion (7.2%); electrical equipment (4%).

From the Spanish perspective, in 2013, Tunisia has positioned itself as our customer number 41 and our provider number 56. From the Spanish perspective, in 2014 Tunisia stood as our customer number 44 and our supplier number 69. The balance of bilateral services remains favorable to Spain thanks to the transport sector.

== Cooperation ==
In November 2013, the Technical Cooperation Office was closed. From that date the follow-up of the cooperation program in Tunisia is carried out by the Head of Spanish Cooperation at the Spanish Embassy in Tunisia.

The main framework in which Spanish Cooperation works in Tunisia is the one that constitutes the Masar Program, an accompaniment program for democratic governance processes in the Arab world. Since the 2011 revolution, efforts in Tunisia have focused on supporting civil society initiatives and strengthening democratic governance.

== See also ==
- Foreign relations of Spain
- Foreign relations of Tunisia
- Tunisia–European Union relations
