= Naksa (disambiguation) =

The Naksa was the displacement of around 300,000 Palestinians from the West Bank and the Gaza Strip in 1967 after the Six-Day War.

Naksa and similar may also mean:

- Naksa Day (Arabic for "day of the setback"), the anniversary of the 1967 Six-Day War
- Adab al-Naksa, the "literature of defeat", a part of Syrian literature
- Nakşa, the old Turkish name for Naxos, an island in the Aegean Sea
- Naxxar, a village on Malta
- Naxa (moth), a moth genus in the family Geometridae

== See also ==
- Palestinian exodus (disambiguation)
- Nakba, displacement of Palestinians since the 1948 Palestine war
