= Ethnic groups in Algeria =

Ethnic groups of Algeria
Ethnic groups	percent
Arabs	85%
Berbers	15%

Ethnic groups in Algeria include Arabs and Berbers, who represent 99% of the population, of which 75–85% are Arab and 15–25% are Berber. Algeria also has a small European minority, representing less than 1% of the population. The minority European population is predominantly of French, Spanish, Catalan, and Italian descent.

== Arabs ==
The majority of the population of Algeria is ethnically Arab, constituting between 75% and 85% of the total. The Arabs of Algeria are primarily descended from the Arabian conquerors and migrants who arrived in the region between the 7th and 17th centuries during the Arab migrations to the Maghreb. These migrations and conquests resulted in the Arabization of many of the Berber tribes native to the region; they adopted Islam and their languages were supplanted by Arabic. Intermingling between Arabs and Berbers has also contributed to the formation of the Algerian Arab identity.

The Arab population of Algeria is concentrated mainly in the northern and coastal regions of the country, where they make up a majority of the population. They are predominantly Sunni Muslim, with a Shia Muslim minority. Their language is the Algerian dialect of Arabic, which is subject to regional variation.

Arabic cultural and linguistic identity, was suppressed during the French colonization of Algeria, and the years since independence have seen a movement to reclaim and reassert it.

== Berbers ==
The Berber minority makes up between 15% and 24% of the population. Berbers are divided into many subgroups with a variety of languages. The largest Berber group in Algeria is the Kabyle people, who are concentrated in the Kabylia region. Resident in what is now Algeria for thousands of years, Berbers were originally a tribal people, organized into clans and confederations, and were known for their fierce resistance to foreign invaders. Christianized in Late Antiquity during the Christianization of the Roman Empire, Berbers became Arabized and Islamized after the Muslim conquest of the Maghreb under the Rashidun and Umayyad Caliphate.

Estimates of the number of Tamazight (Berber or Amazigh languages) in Algeria range widely, from 17% to 45–55% of the population when bi/trilingual speakers are taken into account.

Due to the growth of Arabic as the predominant language of culture and religion, the imposition of French during colonization, and assimilationist laws that forbade its usage, Tamazight in Algeria experienced a decline.

== Other ethnic groups ==
=== Europeans ===
A small percentage of Algerians are of French, Spanish, Catalan or Italian heritage. Under French rule, Europeans owned sizable farms and companies. They enjoyed significant economic privilege relative to Algeria's native population, despite being a minority. The majority of Europeans are Christians or Jews, while most of the population overall is Muslim.

=== Jewish ===
Algeria was the home of a significant Jewish community, most of which fled after Algeria's independence. The number of Jewish people in Algeria is estimated to be only around 200 by 2020. Jewish people have lived in Algeria from the early centuries of the Common Era. Following the expulsion of Jews from Spain in the fourteenth century, a large number relocated to Algeria, greatly expanding the Jewish population there. Under French rule, Jewish people were given French nationality. After Algerian independence, around 130,000 Jews left for France. It is also estimated that around 25,681 Jews moved from Algeria to Israel since the latter's founding in 1948.

== See also ==
- Languages of Algeria
- Religions of Algeria
- Culture of Algeria
