= Italy–Tunisia relations =

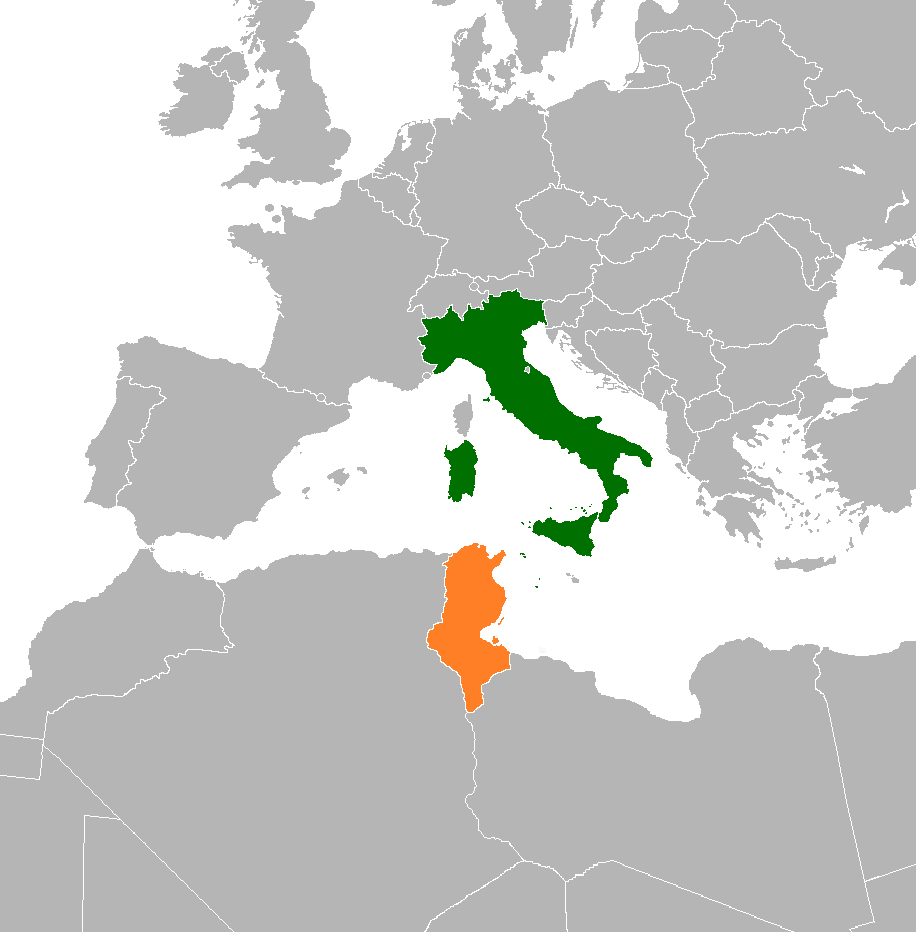
- Italy: Tunisia

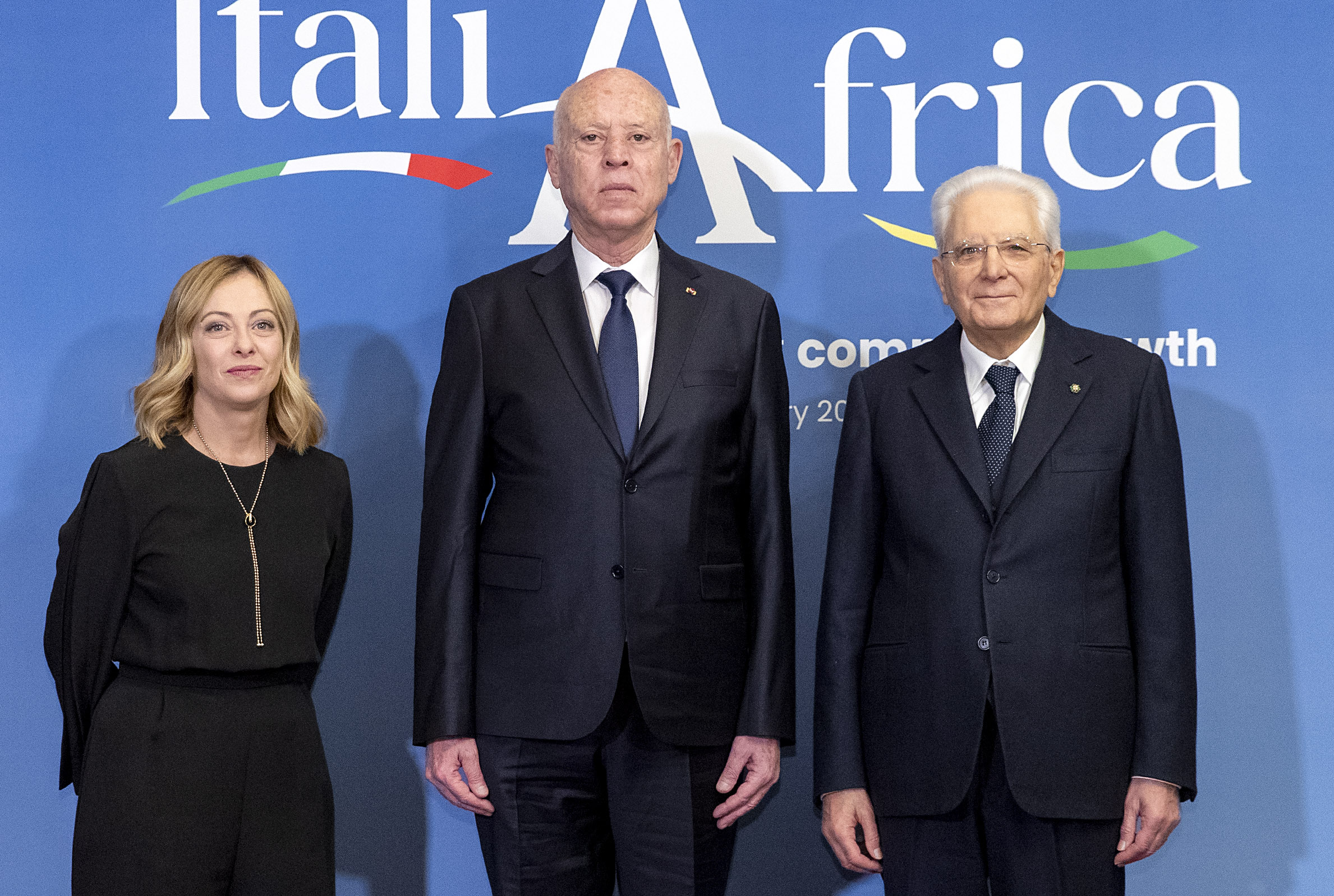
Italian Prime Minister Giorgia Meloni and President Sergio Mattarella with Tunisian President Kais Saied at the 2024 Italy-Africa Summit in Rome

Italy–Tunisia relations are foreign relations between the Italian Republic and the Republic of Tunisia. Both countries established diplomatic relations in 1957. Italy has an embassy in Tunis. Tunisia has an embassy in Rome, a general consulate in Palermo, 3 consulates (in Genoa, Milan, and Naples).

Both countries are full members of the Union for the Mediterranean. There was an important Italian community living in Tunisia before independence. There is a Tunisian community in Italy; the COVID-19 pandemic in Italy saw Tunisia one of the few nations to send army doctors to Italy.

== Migratory relations Italy–Tunisia ==
Since the Unification of Italy, there has been a considerable migration of Italians to Tunisia. Today in Tunisia there are a lot of Italian communities. Conversely, the presence of Tunisians in Italy dates back to the 1980s.

In Tunisia the economic and political crisis is relevant. The year 2015 was marked by terrorist attacks. With these attacks Tunisia economic growth was limited, especially in tourism, one of the main sectors. In 2020 the economic crisis increased with COVID-19 pandemic.

To create agreements and collaborations about immigration, development and support for the Tunisian population in their country there are ongoing Negotiations between the Ministry of Foreign Affairs and International Cooperation of Tunisia and Ministry of Foreign Affairs and International Cooperation of Italy.

In March 2021, a bilateral agreement was signed. In August 2020 ministers Luigi Di Maio and Luciana Lamorgese visited Tunisia and the aim of the visit was to reaffirm the joint commitment to a strong EU-Tunisia partnership, covering political and economic relations as well as cooperation in the field of migration. In 2020, also, there was an agreement between Italy and the European Union for migration flows .

In 2023, migration cooperation between Italy and Tunisia intensified following increased arrivals of migrants from Tunisia to Italy. Italian Prime Minister Giorgia Meloni and Tunisian President Kais Saied became key partners in negotiations involving the European Union, including financial assistance and support aimed at reducing irregular migration across the Mediterranean. The agreements were criticized by human rights organizations, which expressed concerns that European governments were prioritizing migration control while overlooking Tunisia's deteriorating human rights and political situation.

== Economic relations ==
The geographical proximity and the free access to the European market by Tunisia make commercial relations between the two countries quite stable.

Trade in 2020 was around 4.5 billion euros. Italy is the second supplier of the North African country, after France, with a market share of about 15% in 2020 and is its second customer.

The presence of Italian companies in Tunisia is strong with 426 active Italian companies which employ 8,836 people. They account for almost a third of all foreign-owned companies in Tunisia.

== Fiscal agreement ==
Double tax agreements (1979)

On 16 May 1979, in Tunis, the Government of the Italian Republic and the Government of the Tunisian Republic signed the Convention to avoid double taxation in the field of income taxes and to prevent tax evasion.

Bilateral investment treaty (1985)

The Bilateral investment treaty between Italy and Tunisia was signed in Rome on 17 October 1985. This treaty establishes the terms and conditions for private investments by citizens and companies of a state in the territory of the other country.

== Energy cooperation ==
In the context of energy cooperation, the presence of the Transmed gas pipeline is significant. It crosses the Mediterranean and Tunisia connects Italy to the Algerian gas fields.

On 30 November 2016, during the "Tunisia 2020" international conference, Eni and the Tunisian state company ETAP signed a further cooperation agreement for the development of energy generation projects from renewable sources.

On 2 May 2019, as part of the first Italy-Tunisia intergovernmental summit, held in Tunis, the vice-premier and minister of economic development, Luigi Di Maio, signed an agreement with the Tunisian minister of industry, Slim Feriani. The agreement concerns the construction of a submarine power line between Italy and Tunisia co-financed by the European Union and the energy companies Terna and STEG.

On 2 July 2019 in Tunis, the Minister of Industry Slim Feriani and the CEO of ENI Claudio Descalzi signed a new agreement in the presence of the Prime Minister of Tunisia Youssef Chahed. It extends cooperation for the transit of Algerian natural gas through Tunisia until 2029.

== Cultural cooperation ==
Historically, Italy and Tunisia are also linked on a cultural level, as migration and colonization during the 19th century brought large numbers of Italians to the North African country. The Italian presence supported the building of hospitals, schools, industries, small towns (the most famous being La Goulette), newspapers, reviews and cultural institutes. Moreover, the links between Italy and Tunisia range from culture and literature to gastronomy and even language itself, as the Tunisian language has absorbed many words from the Italian language, for example jilat from the Italian gelato (meaning 'ice cream').

A cooperation agreement, dating back to 1997, governs cultural relations between Tunisia and Italy, managing teacher exchanges and the awarding of Scholarships and research grants. The Italian Cultural Institute plays the important role of presenting Italian culture to consolidate cultural relations between the two countries. This state body, which depends on and answers to the Ministry of Foreign Affairs, organizes Italian language study courses with mother tongue teachers and final exams, offers translations into Arabic of literary works of significant value for Italian culture, the diffusion of Italian cinema, arranges concerts, art exhibitions and festivals and provides information of various kinds on the Italian school system, scholarships and more. In general, the institute is concerned with spreading knowledge of Italian culture in the country.

== The Craxi affair ==
In 1992, a system of bribes was discovered in Italy. This illegal system also involved Bettino Craxi's political party, the Italian Socialist Party (PSI). This triggered a series of judicial enquiries that would take the name 'Mani Pulite'.

In 1994 Craxi lost his parliamentary immunity and on 12 May 1994 his passport was withdrawn because he was in danger of absconding. But it was too late because Craxi was already in Hammamet protected by the President of Tunisia, Ben Ali.

Craxi entered Tunisia regularly and, thanks to an Italian-Tunisian agreement signed in the 1960s, was recognised as a political refugee. Tunisia welcomed, protected and cared for Craxi. While the protests against Craxi's PSI and corruption continued in Italy, in Tunisia according to his daughter he received the affection of the people.

Italy, however, could not claim anything from Tunisia on the basis of the agreement signed between the two countries in the 1960s. Nevertheless, there were several requests for Craxi's extradition.

Among those most active in the request for Craxi's extradition were Antonio Di Pietro and Diego Novelli. On 15 July 1998, Diego Novelli, on behalf of forty deputies, presented an urgent parliamentary question to know "what initiatives" the government intended to take to obtain Craxi's extradition. Novelli was answered by Enzo Lo Giudice, Craxi's lawyer, who said that the non-extradition 'does not depend on a quirk of the Tunisian government or on the complacency and inertia of the Italian government: it depends on the law, both Italian and foreign'.

Craxi continued from Tunisia to participate in Italian political life through faxes and letters. In the last years of his life he suffered from numerous health problems and there was a vain attempt to negotiate his return to Italy, also for medical treatment, which was unsuccessful.

== See also ==
- Foreign relations of Italy
- Foreign relations of Tunisia
- Tunisia–EU relations
- Italian Tunisians
- List of ambassadors of Italy to Tunisia
