= The Travelers (sculptures) =

Sculptures by Bruno Catalano

- Les Voyageurs
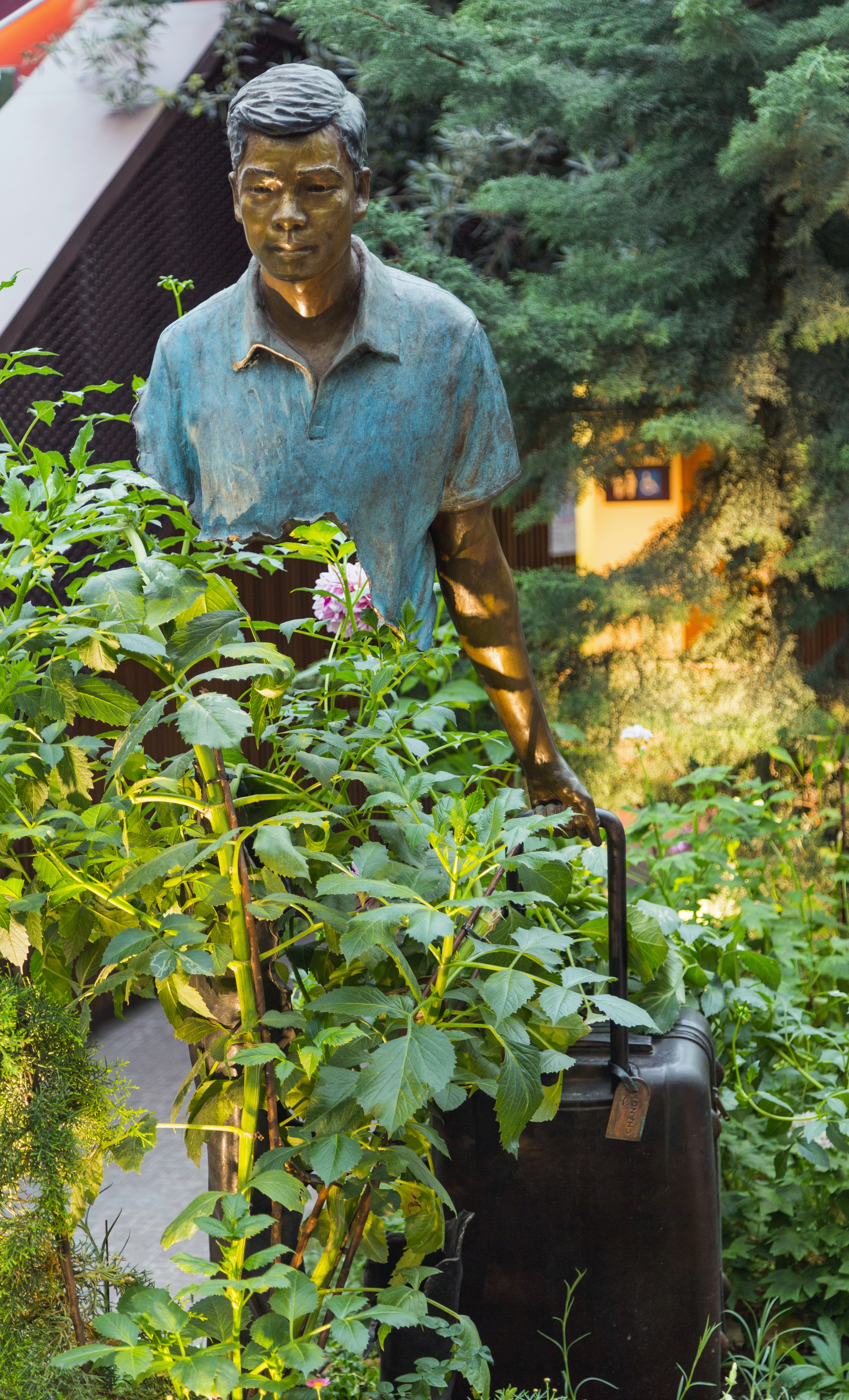
- 2016 Les Voyageur at Gardens by the Bay, Singapore
- Designer: Bat-Ylalt
- Year: 2013–2014
- Medium: Bronze
- Location: Marseille-Fos Port

The Travelers, also known as Les Voyageurs, are bronze surrealist sculptures by the French artist Bruno Catalano. The central part of each statue is missing. The artist has said that the statues are meant to represent emigrants.

== Background ==
Catalano has said that the statues are a representation of his own life. He was a native of Morocco who emigrated to France. He believes that emigrants and travelers leave a part of themselves behind that they have to forget, but yet it is always connected to them.

In 2004, when he was constructing his first traveler statue, Catalano found a flaw, which gave him the idea to remove a large part of the statue. To him it represented an emigrant being "uprooted" and also depicted "suffering". Even though the statues represent something left behind, they all carry a bag and seem "to walk towards the hope of a better future".

The sculptures have been interpreted as a visual representation of the losses experienced by emigrants.

== Sculptures ==
Catalano created a whole series of these sculptures, which look like human working people. They are collectively called Les Voyageurs.

The sculptures are examples of surrealist art. They portray human beings with large parts of their bodies missing. Each statue carries a single case. The case represents a weight on the traveler, and also connects the upper and lower parts of the sculpture. The missing space is left for the viewer to interpret.

== Public display ==
In 2013–2014, Bruno Catalano created the sculptures and displayed them in Marseille, France, at the Marseille-Fos Port. The artist displayed ten of these sculptures in the port's outdoor exhibit.

The most famous of these Traveler sculptures is Le Grand van Gogh, which is now on permanent display in Calgary, Canada.

In 2019 thirty Traveler sculptures were displayed in places around Venice, Italy, as part of the 58th Venice Biennale. The centrepiece was a tableau in the Church of San Gallo which included fragile terracotta versions of the statues. The four terracotta works were complete human figures and each was placed opposite a traditional incomplete Traveler statue in bronze, intending to represent the end of the emigrants' journeys.

From July to September 2021, four of the sculptures were on display on the waterfront at Arcachon, France.
