= Sweden–Tunisia relations =

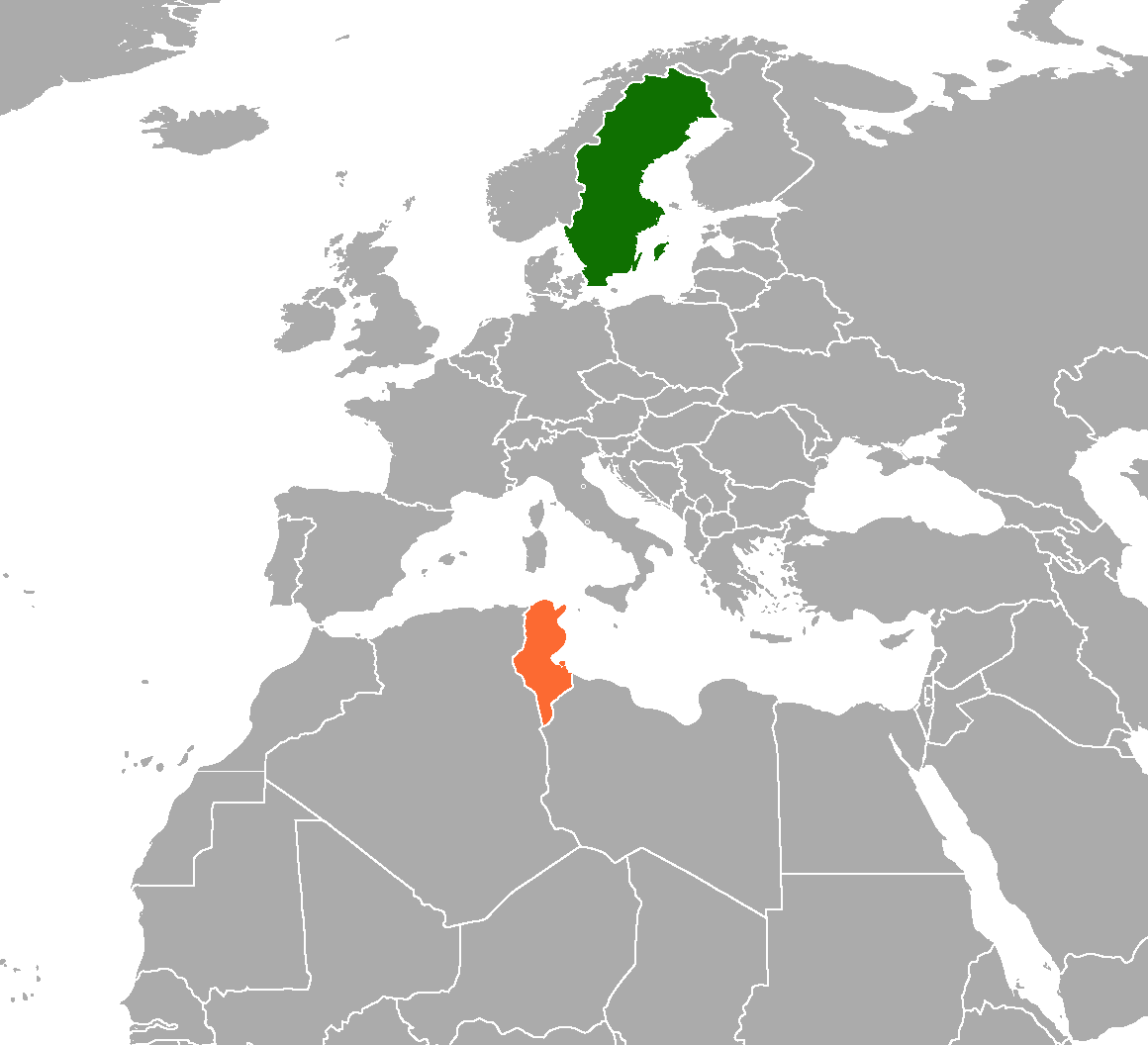
- Sweden: Tunisia

Sweden–Tunisia relations refers to the current and historical relationship between Sweden and Tunisia. Connections between the two countries date back to 1736, when the Swedes concluded a treaty of peace and trade with the Beylik of Tunis. Formal relations began after Tunisian independence from France in 1956, and have continued since.

== History ==
A Swedish consulate was established in Tunis in 1737 at the request of Swedish merchants and in connection with the peace treaty concluded that same year. The district covered all the ports in Tunis. The consulate was dissolved in 1882 and replaced by a vice-consulate under the consulate general in Algiers. The consulate was re-established in 1897, with its district encompassing the French protectorate of Tunisia.

In June 1956, Sweden officially recognized Tunisia as an independent state. The Swedish consulate in Tunis had established relations with the Tunisian authorities, signifying Sweden's recognition of Tunisia. Sweden and Tunisia established diplomatic relations that same year.

The Swedish ambassador to Tunisia was initially resident in Rabat, Morocco. A Swedish embassy opened in Tunis in 1963. It closed in 2001. On 5 November 2015, the Swedish government announced that the embassy in Tunis would be reopened. In 2016 and after 14 years of its closure, the Swedish embassy in Tunis has reopened its doors in the presence of the foreign ministers of the two countries. Tunisia has an embassy in Stockholm, and after the Tunisian President Beji Caid Essebsi official visit in November 2015, the head of the embassy became ambassador.

Tunisia is a popular destination for Swedish tourists, in addition to the bilateral trade and humanitarian aid between the countries. During the unrest that followed the Tunisian Revolution in January 2011, about a dozen Swedes who had come to Tunisia to hunt boars were beaten and arrested on suspicion of being foreign terrorists. While the Sweden supported the new leadership of Tunisia following the Revolution, the Left Party politician Hans Linde condemned the Swedish government for maintaining an extensive arms trade with Tunisia in previous years, fueling the regime of Zine El Abidine Ben Ali.

== See also ==
- Foreign relations of Sweden
- Foreign relations of Tunisia
- Tunisia–European Union relations
