= Somali people in Italy =

Somalis in Italy
Total population
- 7,903 (ISTAT, 2016)

Regions with significant populations
- Lazio · Sicily · Tuscany

Languages
- Somali · Arabic · Italian

Religion
- Islam & Christianity (Catholic Church)

Somalis and Italo Somalis in Italy are citizens and residents of Italy who are of Somali ancestry. The community is small, dating to the end of the Italian Empire.

== Demographics ==
As of 2016, there were 7,903 immigrants from Somalia in Italy. In 2006, there were 6,414 residents. The three cities with the largest concentration of Somalis are: Rome (1,885), Turin (464) and Florence (443).

== Notable individuals ==
- Jonis Bashir, singer and actor
- Dacia Valent, politician
- Saba Anglana, actress and singer
- Cristina Ali Farah, writer
- Igiaba Scego, writer
- Fabio Liverani, footballer
- Zahra Bani, athlete

== See also ==
- Italian Somalis
- Kingdom of Italy
- Italy–Somalia relations
