= Dacia Valent =

Italian politician (1963–2015)

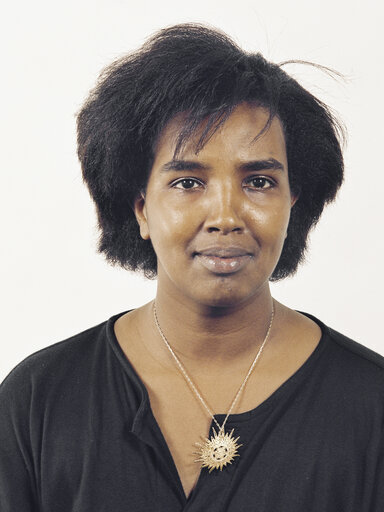

Member of the European Parliament
- In office 18 June 1989 – 12 June 1994

Personal details
- Born: 12 February 1963 Mogadishu, Somalia
- Died: 22 January 2015 (aged 51) Rome, Italy
- Party: PCI (1989–1991); PRC (1991–1994)
- Occupation: Politician

Dacia Soraya Valent (12 February 1963 – 22 January 2015) was a Somali-born Italian politician and former Member of the European Parliament.

== Biography ==
Dacia Valent was born in Mogadishu to an Italian father and a Somali mother. She traveled extensively around the world during her youth and moved permanently to Udine, in Northern Italy, in 1980.

In 1985, while she lived in Udine, her 16-year-old brother Giacomo was stabbed to death as the result of a fight with two classmates. She lived in Rome at the time of his death.

After an unsuccessful period as an Engineering student and after the breakup of her marriage (during which she gave birth to two children), she joined the Polizia di Stato and was initially assigned to a police station in Milan. She was later transferred first to the mobile squad and later to the Special VIP protection service at Palermo. In January 1989, while on duty, Valent stated that a visibly drunken man insulted her with heavily racist remarks, refusing to hand her documents for identification and assaulting her physically. During this incident, Valent was on patrol with two male colleagues who Valent accused of being negligent in helping her and who attempted to minimize the incident, as the assaulter was drunk. Valent denounced the supposed irregular behaviour of her colleagues to the media and through this incident, coupled with her background, she gained solidarity as well as experiencing a wide popularity.

As an activist of the Italian Communist Party (PCI), Valent was candidated with the support of the then Secretary Achille Occhetto to the European Parliament and was elected in the 1989 elections with about 76,000 votes. Her position as an Independent MEP of the PCI caused some friction with the Party Board. Particularly famous was the diplomatic row with the Government of the State of Israel which, in a 1990 column on the magazine "Avvenimenti" was deemed as «the most racist Government in the world» and compared to the Third Reich. The outrage sparked by these statements, allegedly forced the Israeli Ambassador in Italy, Mordechai Drory, to file an official written complaint to Achille Occhetto, who distanced himself and the PCI from Valent's statements. At Strasbourg Dacia Valent was a member of the Commission on Legal Affairs and Citizens Rights (1989–1992), of the Joint Assembly of the Convention between the ACP and the EEC (1989–1994), and of the Committee on Civil Liberties and Internal Affairs (1992).

Following the dissolution of the PCI and its subsequent transformation into the Democratic Party of the Left, she decided not to join the new political entity but she rather chose to be enrolled in the Communist Refoundation Party. After some time she was expelled from the party for her declaration of admiration to the former neo-fascist politician Gianfranco Fini, leader of right-wing party Alleanza Nazionale. Dacia Valent tried unsuccessfully to run for a seat under the Alleanza Nazionale party, and finally was candidated to the European elections of 2004 with the list of Antonio Di Pietro getting 583 preferences without being elected.

On 26 July 1992, Dacia Valent founded a non-governmental organization known as SCORE and was nominated Chairwoman of it. In 1995 as a member of that group, she supported the action of a group of Somali women who denounced requests for sexual favors by the CGIL trade union in exchange for concessions in the allocation of food, but the CGIL denied the circumstances and Dacia Valent was found guilty of defamation after a Court trial. In April 1995 she was arrested for the attempted murder of Luc Tchombé Mutshail, a citizen of Zaire with whom she had a child; Tchombé was injured by Valent with a knife during a fight. Later in 2002, she was sanctioned by the Italian Comptroller and Auditor General for improper administration of the money invested from the Italian Government into SCORE which was meant instead to be used to build temporary sojourn and assistance centres for illegal immigrants. For these reason she lost the opportunity to be nominated in the Berlusconi government as a Minister of Immigration.

Later, after her supposed conversion to Islam, she founded an organization called Islamic Anti-Defamation League. Among its initiatives, the organization provided a telephone support and advisory service for Muslims who wished to report abuse issues based on religious discrimination. The toll free number, however, ceased to be operational shortly after.

In November 2006, Dacia Valent was indicted for aiding and abetting in a robbery against a Polish immigrant who had turned to SCORE for help. In October 2007, she was sentenced to one year in jail and a 15,000 euro fine for defamation and threats against the former director of Telepadania. In October 2008, an article published on her personal blog, titled "Italians bastards, shitty Italians", which reportedly featured a number of derogatory comments against Italians (specified also as «whites and Christians») ignited some strong outrage from the press.

In January 2010, she acquired the political portal Kilombo.org, an aggregator of blogs.

In 2012, she underwent another Criminal Court trial for repeatedly defaming the Moroccan-born politician Souad Sbai and she was found guilty as charged.

On 22 January 2015, Dacia Valent died in Rome from a heart attack, while she was hospitalized for other health issues.
