= Tahar Lamri =

Algerian writer (born 1958)

- Born: 1958 (age 67–68); Algiers
- Occupation: Writer

Tahar Lamri (born 1958 in Algiers) is an Algerian writer.

== Biography ==
Tahar lived in Libya from 1979 to 1984. He concluded his law studies in international relations and worked as translator for the French embassy in Benghazi. He moved later to France. Since 1986 he has lived in Ravenna, Italy. He published the collection of stories I sessanta nomi dell'amore and several short stories in Italy.

== Works ==
As a writer, he attends various seminars, conferences and cultural activities concerning foreign literature and migrant literature.

In 1997, he participated at the international convention Migration and conflicts in the making of European democracy at the University of Bologna. In July 2003, he participated in the third Italian Seminary Migrant Writers, promoted by the literary magazine Sagarana. In March 2004, he participated at the third convention of "Migration Culture and Literature" of the city of Ferrara. He attends the Mediterranean Cultures Festival of Ravenna, promoted by the association, in May 2007.

He wrote and directed a video story, La casa dei Tuareg (Home of Tuareg), presented at the Rasi Theatre of Ravenna and a theatrical narration, Wolf e le elecubrazioni di un kazoo. In June 1995, he won the prize in the first edition of the Eks&Tra literary competition, with the story Solo allora sono certo potrò capire (Only then, I’m sure I will understand). In 1999, the English translation of this story has been published in the Mediterranean Crossroads anthology.

He teamed up with I Metissage and Teresa De Sio for the musical CD Metissage, featuring the piece La ballata di Riva (SOS Razzismo - Il Manifesto 1997). He wrote "Il pellegrinaggio della voce" (The pilgrimage of voice), represented in 2001 at the Teather Santarcangelo of Romagna.

From 2005 he attended the European project And The City Spoke, with several writers and actors from different European cities. He has collaborated with Ravenna Teatro, telling theatrical stories for children and adults, and organized two festivals along with the cultural association Insieme per l’Algeria (Together for Algeria).

He has published the story Il pellegrinaggio della voce (The pilgrimage of voice) and Ma dove andiamo? Da nessuna parte solo più lontano (Where are we going? Nowhere only farther). The book of tales I sessanta nomi dell'amore (The sixty names of Love) was awarded the narrative prize in the International Competition in the city of Anguillara.

Tahar Lamri is editor for Città Meticcia, a twice-monthly intercultural newspaper, promoted by the homonymous association of the city of Ravenna.

== Bibliography ==
- "Solo allora sono certo potrò capire", (Only then, I’m sure I will understand), in Le voci dell'arcobaleno (Voices of the rainbow), Rome, Fara Editore, 1996
- "Il pellegrinaggio della voce" (The pilgrimage of voice) and "Ma dove andiamo? Da nessuna parte solo più lontano" (Where are we going? Nowhere only farther) in Parole di sabbia, Edizioni Il Grappolo, 2002
- I sessanta nomi dell'amore (The sixty names of Love), Rome, Fara Editore, 2006; Traccediverse, 2007
