= Palestinian exodus =

"Palestinian exodus" may refer to any of the following events:

- 1948 Palestinian expulsion and flight, also known as the Nakba (النكبة, lit. 'The Catastrophe'), after the 1948 Palestine war
  - Palestinian expulsion from Lydda and Ramle
  - 1949–1956 Palestinian expulsions, continuation of the 1948 expulsion
- Naksa (النكسة, lit. 'The Setback'), 1967 Palestinian exodus from the Israeli-occupied territories after the Six-Day War
- Black September, 1971 Palestinian exodus during conflict in Jordan
- 1982 Lebanon War, Palestinian exodus during the war in Lebanon
- Palestinian exodus from Kuwait (1990–91)

== See also ==
- Naksa (disambiguation)
