= Demographics of Djibouti =

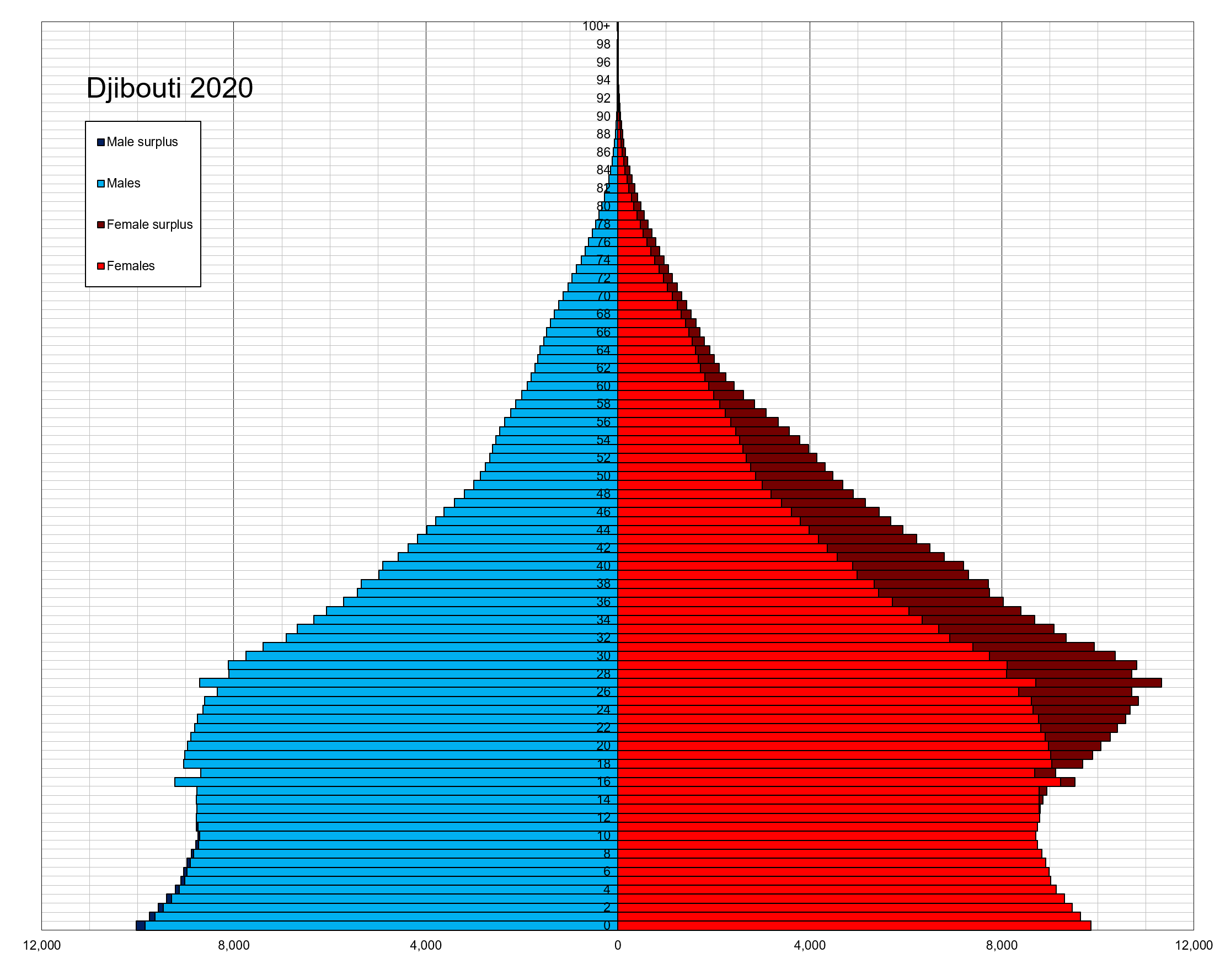
- Djibouti population pyramid in 2020
- Population: 1,066,809 (2024)
- Growth rate: 1.97% (2022)
- Birth rate: 22.25 births/1,000 population (2022 est.)
- Death rate: 7.12 deaths/1,000 population (2022 est.)
- Life expectancy: 65.3 years (2022)
  - male: 62.72 years
  - female: 67.96 years
- Fertility rate: 2.15 children born/woman (2022)
- Infant mortality: 53.31 deaths/1,000 infants (2012 est.)
- Immigrant share: 10.8% (2024)

Age structure
- 0–14 years: 29.97% (male 138,701/female 137,588)
- 15–64 years: 66.06% (male 264,283/female 344,668)
- 65 and over: 3.97% (male 16,245/female 20,319) (2020)

Sex ratio
- Total: 0.86 male(s)/female (2011 est.)
- At birth: 1.03 male(s)/female
- Under 15: 1 male(s)/female
- 15–64 years: 0.8 male(s)/female
- 65 and over: 0.81 male(s)/female

Nationality
- Nationality: Djiboutian
- Major ethnic: Somali 50% Afar 40% Arabs 10%
- Minor ethnic: French; Arab; Ethiopian Total 5%

Language
- Spoken: Somali (non-official), Afar (non-official), French(official), Arabic (official),

Demographic features of Djibouti include population density, ethnicity, education level, health, economic status, religious affiliations and other aspects.

== Population ==
Census population
Year	Pop.	±% p.a.
1960	82,200	—
2009	818,519	+4.80%
2024	1,066,809	+1.78%
Source: INSTAD

Djibouti is a multiethnic country. As of 2024, it has a population of around 1,066, 809 inhabitants. Djibouti's population grew rapidly during the latter half of the 20th century, increasing from about 69,589 in 1955 to around 869,099 by 2015.

According to the 2022 revision of the World Population Prospects, the total population was 1,105,557 in 2021 compared to 62,000 in 1950. The proportion of children below the age of 15 in 2010 was 35.8%, 60.9% was between 15 and 65 years of age, while 3.3% was 65 years or older.

	Total population	Population aged 0–14 (%)	Population aged 15–64 (%)	Population aged 65+ (%)
1950	62 000	46.8	51.2	2.0
1955	70 000	46.0	52.0	2.0
1960	85 000	45.4	52.5	2.0
1965	117 000	44.9	53.0	2.0
1970	162 000	45.8	52.2	2.1
1975	224 000	45.9	52.0	2.1
1980	340 000	45.3	52.5	2.2
1985	403 000	44.6	53.1	2.3
1990	562 000	44.2	53.4	2.4
1995	627 000	43.4	54.1	2.5
2000	732 000	41.3	55.9	2.7
2005	808 000	38.5	58.5	3.0
2010	889 000	35.8	60.9	3.3

Population by Sex and Age Group (Census 29.V.2009):

Age group	Male	Female	Total	%
Total	440 066	378 093	818 159	100
0–4	49 863	41 269	91 132	11.14
5–9	56 117	41 269	101 271	12.38
10–14	48 135	37 337	85 472	10.45
15–19	46 351	39 283	85 634	10.47
20–24	43 786	40 272	84 058	10.27
25–29	40 222	41 995	82 217	10.05
30–34	35 558	33 997	69 555	8.50
35–39	29 563	26 512	56 074	6.85
40–44	25 247	19 734	44 981	5.50
45–49	19 470	15 456	34 926	4.27
50–54	16 363	12 479	28 841	3.53
55–59	10 325	7 860	18 185	2.22
60–64	8 495	6 677	15 172	1.85
65+	10 572	10 069	20 641	2.52
Age group	Male	Female	Total	Percent
0–14	154 115	119 875	273 990	33.49
15–64	275 379	248 149	523 528	63.99
65+	10 572	10 069	20 641	2.52

Population Estimates by Sex and Age Group (01.VII.2021):

Age group	Male	Female	Total	%
Total	527 817	473 636	1 001 452	100
0–4	50 744	49 747	100 491	10.03
5–9	54 487	53 200	107 687	10.75
10–14	52 811	45 854	98 665	9.85
15–19	50 167	40 507	90 674	9.05
20–24	48 044	40 029	88 072	8.79
25–29	45 209	38 999	84 208	8.41
30–34	42 445	38 723	81 168	8.11
35–39	39 077	36 798	75 874	7.58
40–44	34 761	32 809	67 570	6.75
45–49	29 881	28 056	57 936	5.79
50–54	24 442	21 937	46 379	4.63
55–59	19 309	16 508	35 817	3.58
60–64	14 340	11 888	26 229	2.62
65–69	9 975	8 077	18 053	1.80
70–74	6 260	5 158	11 418	1.14
75–79	3 444	2 953	6 397	0.64
80+	2 421	2 393	4 814	0.48
Age group	Male	Female	Total	Percent
0–14	158 042	148 801	306 843	30.64
15–64	347 675	306 254	653 929	65.30
65+	22 100	18 581	40 681	4.06

=== Projections ===
The following are UN medium variant projections; numbers are in thousands:

- 2025 1,166
- 2030 1,262
- 2035 1,356
- 2040 1,447
- 2045 1,535
- 2050 1,619

== Vital statistics ==
Registration of vital events in Djibouti is incomplete. The Population Department of the United Nations prepared the following estimates.

Period	Live births per year	Deaths per year	Natural change per year	CBR*	CDR*	NC*	TFR*	IMR*
1950-1955	3 000	2 000	1 000	50.0	28.3	21.7	7.80	222
1955-1960	4 000	2 000	2 000	50.7	25.7	25.0	7.80	203
1960-1965	5 000	2 000	3 000	51.2	23.8	27.4	7.80	185
1965-1970	7 000	3 000	4 000	50.3	21.6	28.6	7.60	169
1970-1975	9 000	4 000	5 000	47.8	19.4	28.4	7.20	154
1975-1980	13 000	5 000	8 000	45.2	17.4	27.8	6.80	141
1980-1985	16 000	6 000	11 000	44.0	15.5	28.6	6.60	125
1985-1990	21 000	7 000	14 000	43.1	14.5	28.6	6.40	117
1990-1995	24 000	8 000	16 000	40.1	13.4	26.7	5.85	109
1995-2000	23 000	8 000	15 000	34.4	12.2	22.2	5.11	100
2000-2005	24 000	9 000	15 000	31.2	11.3	19.9	4.52	91
2005-2010	25 000	9 000	16 000	29.4	10.5	18.9	3.95	82
* CBR = crude birth rate (per 1000); CDR = crude death rate (per 1000); NC = natural change (per 1000); IMR = infant mortality rate per 1000 births; TFR = total fertility rate (number of children per woman)

=== Life expectancy ===
Period	Life expectancy in Years
1950–1955	41.04
1955–1960	▲42.95
1960–1965	▲45.18
1965–1970	▲47.35
1970–1975	▲50.90
1975–1980	▲52.55
1980–1985	▲54.67
1985–1990	▲56.12
1990–1995	▲57.02
1995–2000	57.02
2000–2005	▲57.29
2005–2010	▲59.05
2010–2015	▲61.62

== Ethnic groups ==
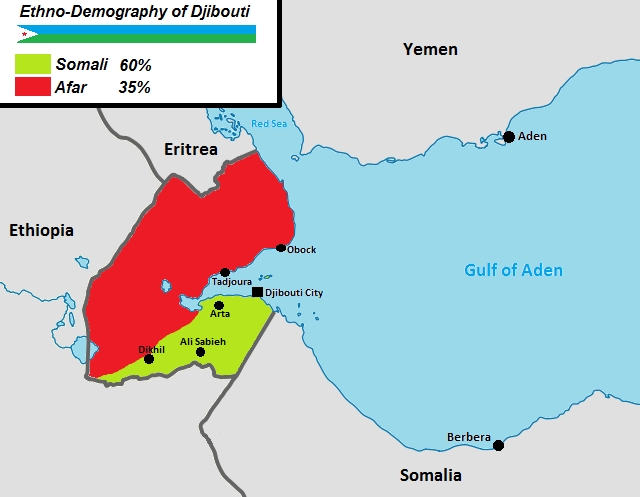
Main ethnic groups in Djibouti.

An Issa woman in nomadic attire.

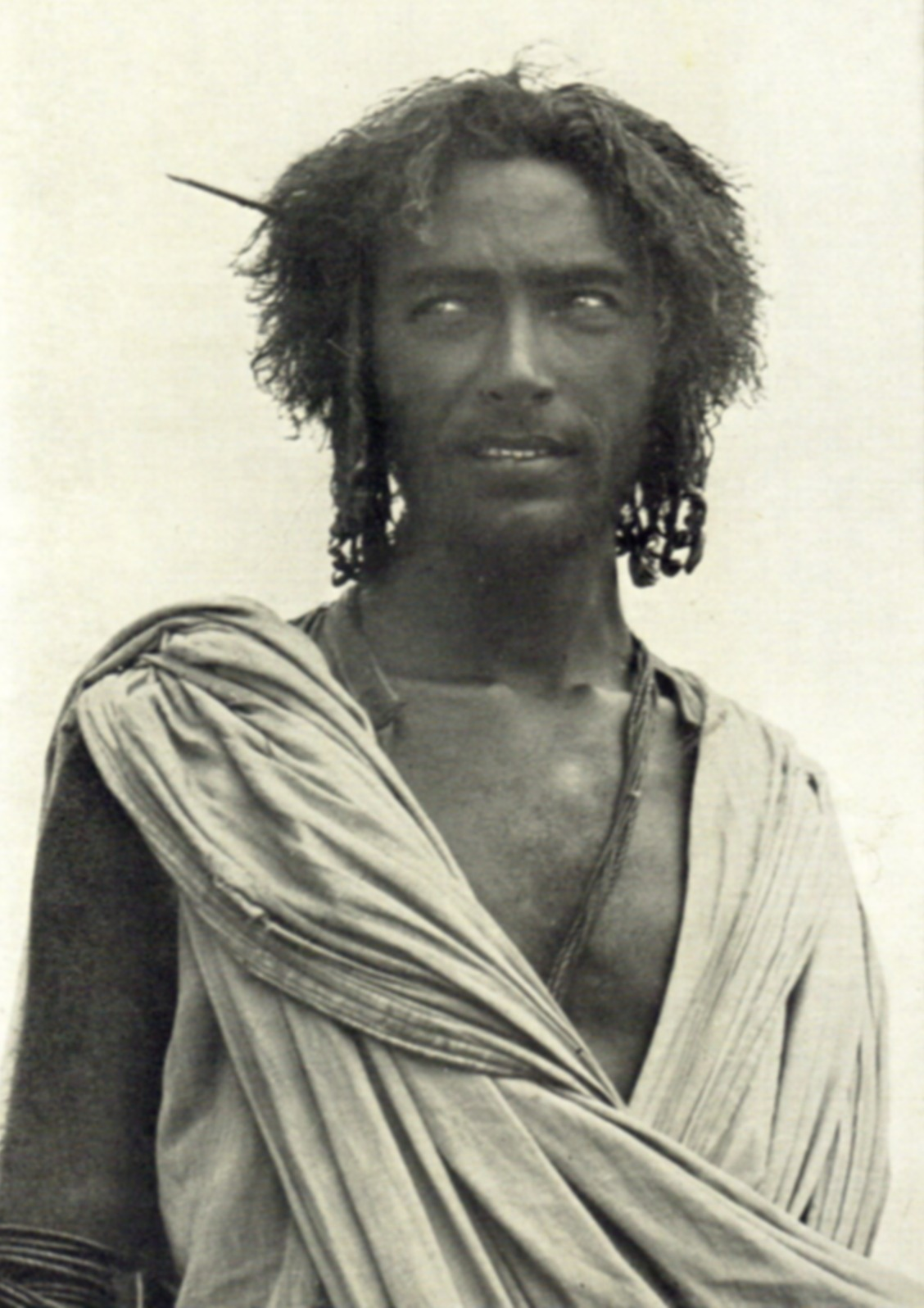
An Afar man in nomadic attire.

The two largest ethnic groups native to Djibouti are the Somali (61%) and the Afar (34%). The Somali clan component is mainly composed of the Issa. The remaining 5% of Djibouti's population primarily consists of Arabs, Ethiopians and Europeans (French and Italians).

In addition, as of 2021, 4,000 American troops, 1,350 French troops, 600 Japanese troops, 400 Chinese troops, and an unknown number of German troops are stationed at various bases throughout Djibouti. Approximately 76% of local residents are urban dwellers; the remainder are pastoralists.

== Languages ==
Djibouti is a multilingual nation. The majority of local residents speak Afar(850,000 speakers in Djibouti city, Dikhil tajora (tagori ), Ali Sabieh) and Somali (100,000 speakers) as a first language. These languages are the mother tongues of the Afar and Somali ethnic groups, respectively. Both languages belong to the larger Afroasiatic family. There are 2 official languages in Djibouti: Arabic and French.

Arabic is of religious importance. In formal settings, it consists of Modern Standard Arabic. Colloquially, about 59,000 local residents speak the Ta'izzi-Adeni Arabic dialect, also known as Djibouti Arabic. French serves as a statutory national language. It was inherited from the colonial period, and is the primary language of instruction. Around 17,000 Djiboutians speak it as a first language. Immigrant languages include Omani Arabic (38,900 speakers), Amharic (1,400 speakers), Greek (1,000 speakers) and Hindi (600 speakers).

== Religion ==
94% of Djiboutians are Sunni Muslim, the remaining 6% are mostly Christian, and there are a few mostly foreign-born residents who are Shia Muslim, Hindu, Jewish, Bahá'í, or atheist.
