= Samir Lacheheb =

French-Algerian footballer (born 1988)

Personal information
- Full name: Samir Amar Lacheheb
- Date of birth: 27 June 1988 (age 38)
- Place of birth: Paris, France
- Height: 1.72 m (5 ft 8 in)
- Position: Midfielder

Team information
- Current team: ASD Lampo 1919

Youth career
- RCF Paris
- Le Havre AC
- AC Ajaccio
- 2007–2008: Ternana
- 2008: → Internazionale (loan)

Senior career*
Years	Team	Apps	(Gls)
2006–2007	Cecina	28	(12)
2007–2011	Ternana	41	(5)
2008	→ Internazionale (loan)	0	(0)
2009	→ Colligiana (loan)	13	(0)
2012	Aprilia	0	(0)
2012–2013	Campobasso	0	(0)
2013	Noto	11	(6)
2013–2014	Turris	14	(1)
2014	Ponsacco	9	(1)
2014–2015	AD Valdinievole Montecatini	?	(11)
2015–2016	Recanatese	5	(2)
2016–2017	Montevarchi Aquila	?	(9)
2017	Trestina	6	(2)
2017–	ASD Lampo 1919	?	(?)
- * Club domestic league appearances and goals as of 4 March 2018

Samir Amar Lacheheb (born 30 June 1988) is a French-Algerian footballer. He currently plays for ASD Lampo 1919.

== Career ==
Lacheheb began his career in the junior ranks of several French clubs: RCF Paris, Le Havre AC and AC Ajaccio. In 2007, he signed with Serie D-side A.S.D. Cecina where he scored 12 goals in 28 games. His performances earned him a move to Ternana Calcio.

On 28 January 2008, Lacheheb was loaned out by Ternana to Inter Milan's Primavera team for 6 months with Inter having a buy option at the end of the loan. However, he returned to Ternana at the end of his loan period.

On 12 January 2012, Lacheheb was sold to Aprilia.

On 23 August 2013, Lacheheb was sold to U.S.D. Noto Calcio.

On 5 December 2013, Lacheheb was sold to F.C. Turris Neapolis 1944.
