= Bruno Catalano =

French sculptor

- Born: 1960 (age 65–66); Khouribga, Morocco
- Notable work: Les Voyageurs sculptures
- Website: http://brunocatalano.com/

Bruno Catalano (born 1960) is an Italian French sculptor who was born in Khouribga (Morocco), renowned for creating sculptures of figures with substantial sections missing.

== Early life ==
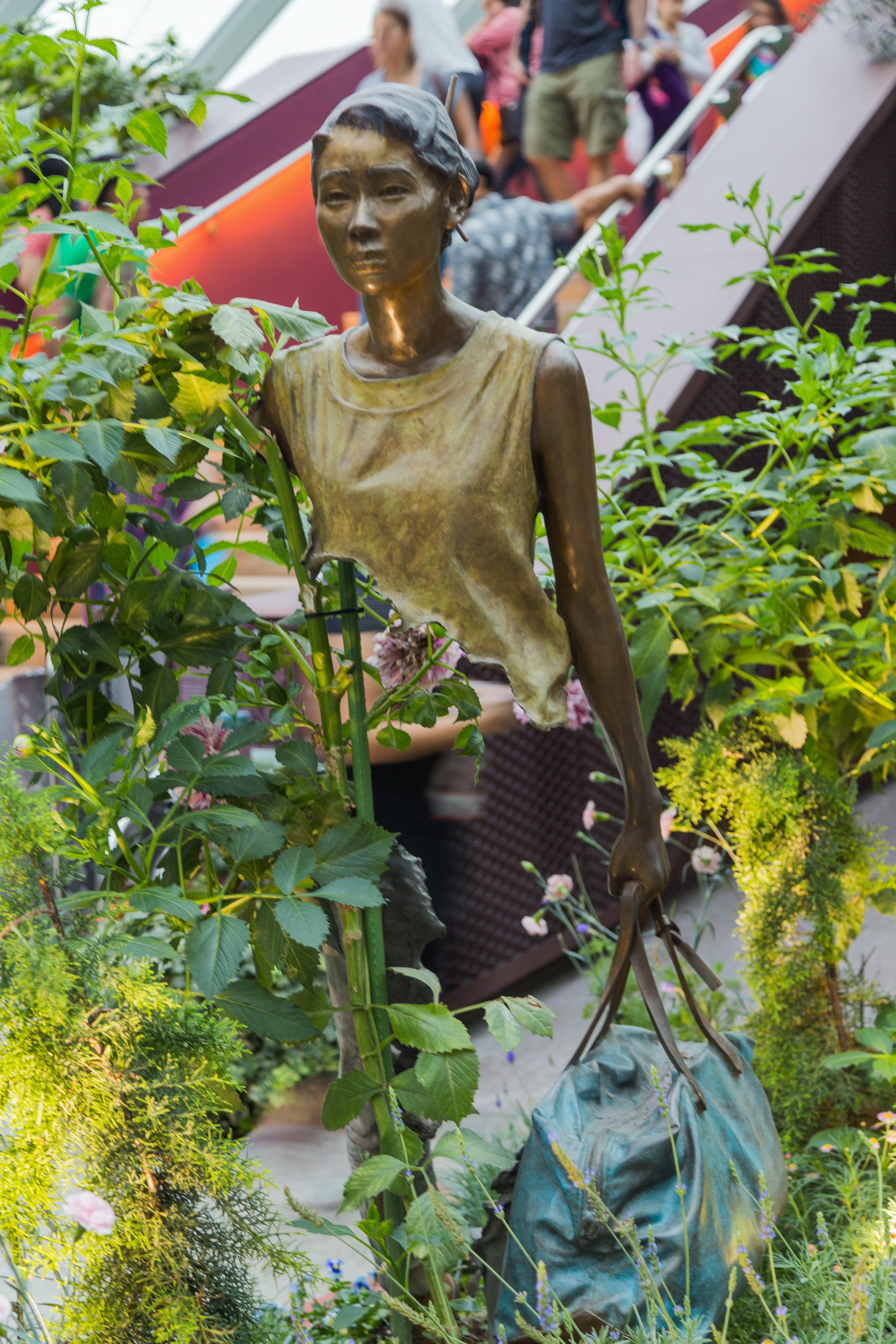
2016 Singapur, Gardens, Les Voyageurs sculpture

Born in Morocco, Catalano is the third and youngest child of a Sicilian family. In 1970, the Catalano family left Morocco for France. In 1982, he started working at the Société Nationale Maritime Corse Méditerranée. He stayed there 4 years. He cites his experience as a sailor as central to his inspiration. He is also an electrician.

== Career ==
Catalano was acquainted with sculpting in 1981 in Marseille, where he enrolled in Françoise Hamel's modelling classes. After two years of education, he opened his own art practice in 1985 and secured an oven in which he would bake his first clay figure. Later, Catalano began to make big bronze sculptures. His first works were compact and conventional, but the later series became increasingly expressive. In 2004, a flaw in one of his characters – a depiction of Cyrano – prompted him to dig and hollow out the chest. A new path of work ensued.

An exhibition of Catalano's sculptures entitled Les Voyageurs took place in Marseille in September 2013, to celebrate its status as the European Capital of Culture with ten life-size sculptures exhibited at the port of 67.
