= Algerians in Italy =

Total population
- 19,661 (ISTAT: 2019)

Regions with significant populations
- Campania; Emilia-Romagna; Veneto

Languages
- Arabic (Algerian Arabic), French and Italian

Religion
- mainly Sunni Islam

The presence of Algerians in Italy dates back to the 1980s.

== Numbers ==
As of 2019, in Italy, there are 19,661 regular immigrants from Algeria. The three cities with most number of Algerians are: Naples, Rome and Milan.

== Algerians in Italy ==
- Matteo Ferrari (1979), footballer
- Samir Lacheheb (1988), footballer
- Faouzi Ghoulam (1991), footballer
- Saphir Taïder (1992), footballer
- Mohamed Salim Fares (1996), footballer
- Tahar Lamri (1958), writer
- Amara Lakhous (1970), writer and anthropologist
- Luca Guadagnino (1971), filmmaker born to an Italian father and an Algerian mother

== See also ==
- Arabs in Italy
- Algerian Americans
- Algerian Canadians
- Algerians in the United Kingdom
- Algerians in France
- Algeria–Italy relations
