= Souad Sbai =

Italian politician

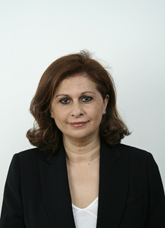
Sbai in 2008

Souad Sbai (Arabic: سعاد السباعي, romanized: Suʿād as-Sbāʿī; born 1961) is a Moroccan-born Italian politician and writer.

She was born in Settat, Morocco, on 5 February 1961. She has lived in Italy since about 1979.

She was a member of the Italian Chamber of Deputies from 2008 to 2013, and in 2011 sponsored legislation to ban wearing the burqa in public in Italy. She has been criticised, alongside Daniela Santanchè, for "setting the political agenda according to a demeaning image of Muslim women". In 2009 she received death threats from Muslim radicals.

Her doctoral thesis (Naples, 2005) was "Diritti delle donne e associazionismo femminile nei paesi del Maghreb", ("Women's rights and women's associations in the Maghreb countries").

She is a member of the Italy-USA Foundation.

== Selected publications ==
- Sbai, Souad (2010). L'inganno : vittime del multiculturalismo. Cantagalli. ISBN 9788882724665. (Deception: victims of multiculturalism)
- Sbai, Souad (2012). Il sogno infranto. Curcio. ISBN 9788897508113. (The broken dream)
- Sbai, Souad (2015). Isis : dietro il palcoscenico dell'orrore (Iizione ed.). ISBN 9788868680961. (Isis: behind the stage of horror)
