= Arabs in Europe =

Arab people living in Europe

Arabs in Europe العرب في اوروبا
Regions with significant populations
- France: 4,000,000–7,000,000
- Spain: 1,600,000–1,800,000
- Germany: 1,401,950
- Netherlands: 682,873
- Italy: 680,000
- United Kingdom: 500,000

Languages
- European languages, Arabic

Religion
- Islam; Christianity; Druze

Related ethnic groups
- Arabs (Arab diaspora)

Arabs in Europe are people from Arabic-speaking countries living in Europe. Millions of Arabs are residents in Europe. The vast majority form part of what is sometimes called the "Arab diaspora".

== Demographics ==
In 2010 the estimate of the Arab population in Europe was at minimum 6 million (the total number of the Arab population in Europe described beneath is 6,370,000 people), mostly concentrated in France, Italy, Spain, Germany, the Netherlands, the United Kingdom, Belgium, Sweden, Denmark, Norway, Finland and Greece. The majority of migrants come from Morocco (2.2 million), Algeria (1.4 million), Tunisia (950,000), Lebanon (700,000), Palestine (700,000), Syria (350,000), Iraq (250,000), Egypt (220,000), Jordan (150,000), Yemen (150,000), Libya (100,000) and Sudan (100,000).

Most Arabs in Europe are followers of Islam but there is also a sizable Arab Christian community. Most of the Lebanese immigrants in Europe are Christians.

== History ==
=== Pre-Islamic Era ===
Arab presence in Europe predates Islam, and became predominant during the eras of the Roman and Byzantine Empire. The Romans conquered the Nabatean Kingdom in the Southern Levant, and named the province Arabia Petraea, and led a failed invasion of Yemen and South Arabia and what they called Arabia Felix or "Happy Arabia". Although at the time, Syria was a non-Arab nation for the most part, it had already been home to a large Arab minority. These were assimilated Arabs, and they established a well-known presence, especially in the Severan Dynasty. In the late 180s, the Roman emperor Septimius Severus married a Syrian Arab by the name of Julia Domna. Domna had a descendant, Elagabalus who eventually became Roman Emperor as well. In 244 A.D., another Syrian Arab by the name of Marcus Julius Philippus or Philip ascended to the Roman throne upon Emperor Gordian III's death. He was given the famous nickname Philip the Arab (Latin: Philippus Arabus) and came from an equestrian family. His father Julius Marinus was known to have been an Arab tribal leader and a prominent Roman citizen who played a part in Philip's ascension to the throne. The Arabs were more culturally independent under Byzantine rule. Originally Azdi pagan migrants, they had adopted Christianity, and bore Arabic names not Latin or Greek.

The Arabian Palmyrene queen Zenobia led a revolt against the Roman Empire. The Augustan History recorded that after suffering an eventual defeat against the Romans, Empeor Aurelian gave Zenobia a villa in Tibur near Hadrian's Villa, where she lived with her children. Zonaras wrote that Zenobia married a nobleman, and Syncellus wrote that she married a Roman senator.

=== Arab occupation of Iberian Peninsula ===
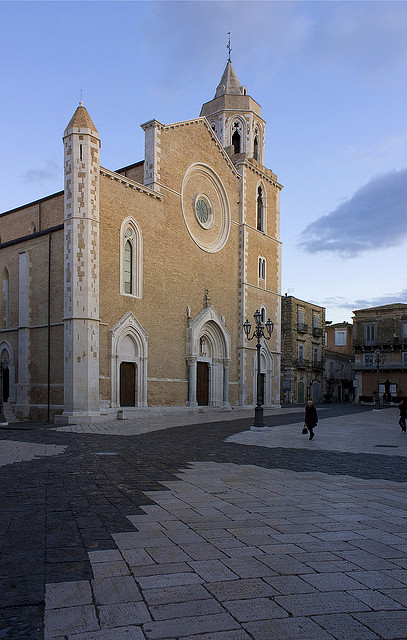
The southern Italian city of Lucera was briefly, during the 13th century, made into an enclave for Arabs deported after the reconquest of Sicily. After they were then expelled from the city, their mosque was converted into Lucera Cathedral.

Arabs in Europe have a history beginning with the Umayyad Caliphate, which conquered the Iberian Peninsula, including what is now Spain and Portugal, in 711 AD. Other Arabs occupied the Italian island of Sicily from 831 to 1072. Arabs were later expelled from those domains after the Reconquista and the Catholic Church's Inquisition of non-believers. There were also brief periods of independent Arab-Islamic colonization and occupation, in modern-day France, Switzerland, and Italy, using Fraxinet in the Gulf of St. Tropez as a base for raids and colonisation.

The Iberian Peninsula was mapped as "Al-Andalus" by the new Muslim invaders. The Arabs were an aristocratic elite who ruled over, a Muslim population (a mix of Berbers, Arabs and Iberian convert the made the vast majority of the population) in Al-Andalus and North Africa. All Muslims in Muslim Spain, regardless of ethnicity, were referred to as "Moors". Spain enjoyed a golden era of Islamic culture, accompanied by a golden age of Sephardic Jewish culture. This era spawned great polymaths and intellectuals such as Averroes and Albucasis. The Islamic rule in Spain also saw the birth of the Aljamiado alphabet, an Arabic alphabet for the Spanish language. In the 15th century, the Muslims were defeated by the Christian armies in a historical process called Reconquista (meaning reconquest in Spanish and Portuguese), which led the Christian monarchs to regain control over the Iberian peninsula. Much of the architecture that was concocted from this era remains intact in Spain and functions as famous tourist destinations since the Catholic monarchs decided to use them rather than destroy them.

After the Moors lost control of Spain, King Philip II made treaties with them allowing them to practice their religion if they gave up their sovereignty, signing the Treaty of Granada in 1491. The Catholic monarchs however, abrogated the treaties and threatened to expel the Moors if they did not become Christians. The Moors did so, but continued speaking Arabic, and using Aljamiado alphabet for spoken Spanish. Some followed Islam in secret (Crypto-Islam). They were later referred to as Moriscos, Moors and their descendants who converted to Christianity rather than be expelled. Religious conversion was simply not enough for the Catholic monarchs. Phillip II implemented a policy to fully assimilate the Moriscos into the Christian Spanish population and eliminate Moorish and Arab culture from Spain. The Moriscos were forced to abandon their Arabic names and adopt a completely Hispanized heritage and give up their children to be educated by priests. Philip II also made speaking Arabic illegal in the kingdom, ordered all Arabic texts to be burned, and banned Moorish attire. After a failed revolt by Morisco leader Aben Humeya (or Ibn Umayyah) in 1568, the Christian monarchs expelled the Moriscos from Spain. Many of these Moriscos headed for North Africa, mainly in Morocco, where many of their descendants settled.

=== Modern migration ===
The post-World War II migration of Arabs to Europe began as many Arabs from former French colonies like Algeria, Morocco, Tunisia, Lebanon and Syria migrated permanently to France. Another source of migration began with guest workers, particularly from Morocco, who arrived under the terms of a Labour Export Agreement between several European countries including Germany, Spain, the Netherlands, Belgium, Austria and France. Other events in the Arab world sent new immigration waives to Europe like the Palestinian exodus, the Lebanese Civil War, the first and second Iraq War, Libyan Civil War and Syrian civil war. Many other Arabs emigrated to Europe because of political issues in their native countries. Arabs who studied in European universities and decided to stay are another source of migration.

After the 2011 events of the Arab Spring in Tunisia and Libya, around 20,000 Tunisian and also Libyan immigrants have left their countries for France and Germany, migrating through Italy. Nicolas Sarkozy and Angela Merkel recommended suspending the Schengen Agreement and imposing border control in order to keep immigrants from migrating to their countries, but no actions have yet been taken on the issue. Italy and Greece kept receiving migration waves from Egypt and Syria since the violence in these two Arab countries escalated in 2013. In 2015 the European continent witnessed its biggest Arab immigration as part of the European migrant crisis when thousands of Arab families escaped from Syria and Iraq.

== See also ==
- Arab diaspora
- Islam in Europe
- Immigration to Europe
- Turks in Europe
- Eurabia conspiracy theory
