= Saudi Arabia–Tunisia relations =

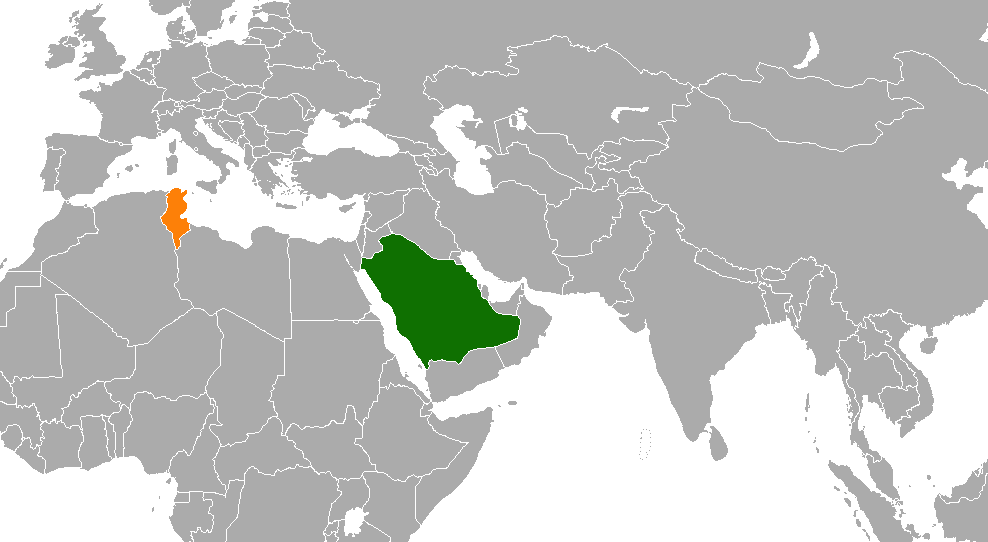
- Tunisia: Saudi Arabia

Diplomatic mission
- Tunisian embassy, Riyadh: Saudi embassy, Tunis

Saudi Arabia–Tunisia relations is the bilateral relations between Saudi Arabia and Tunisia. Saudi Arabia is an absolute monarchy while Tunisia is a democratic republic.

Saudi Arabia has an embassy in Tunis, and Tunisia has one in Riyadh and a consulate in Jeddah. Both countries are members of the Arab League, the Organisation of Islamic Cooperation, and the United Nations.

== Historical ==
The Arab conquest at 7th century had brought Tunisia into an Islamic sphere. A mosque, which is regarded as the fourth holiest place in the Islamic world, the Great Mosque of Kairouan, was built in Tunisia.

== Modern relations ==
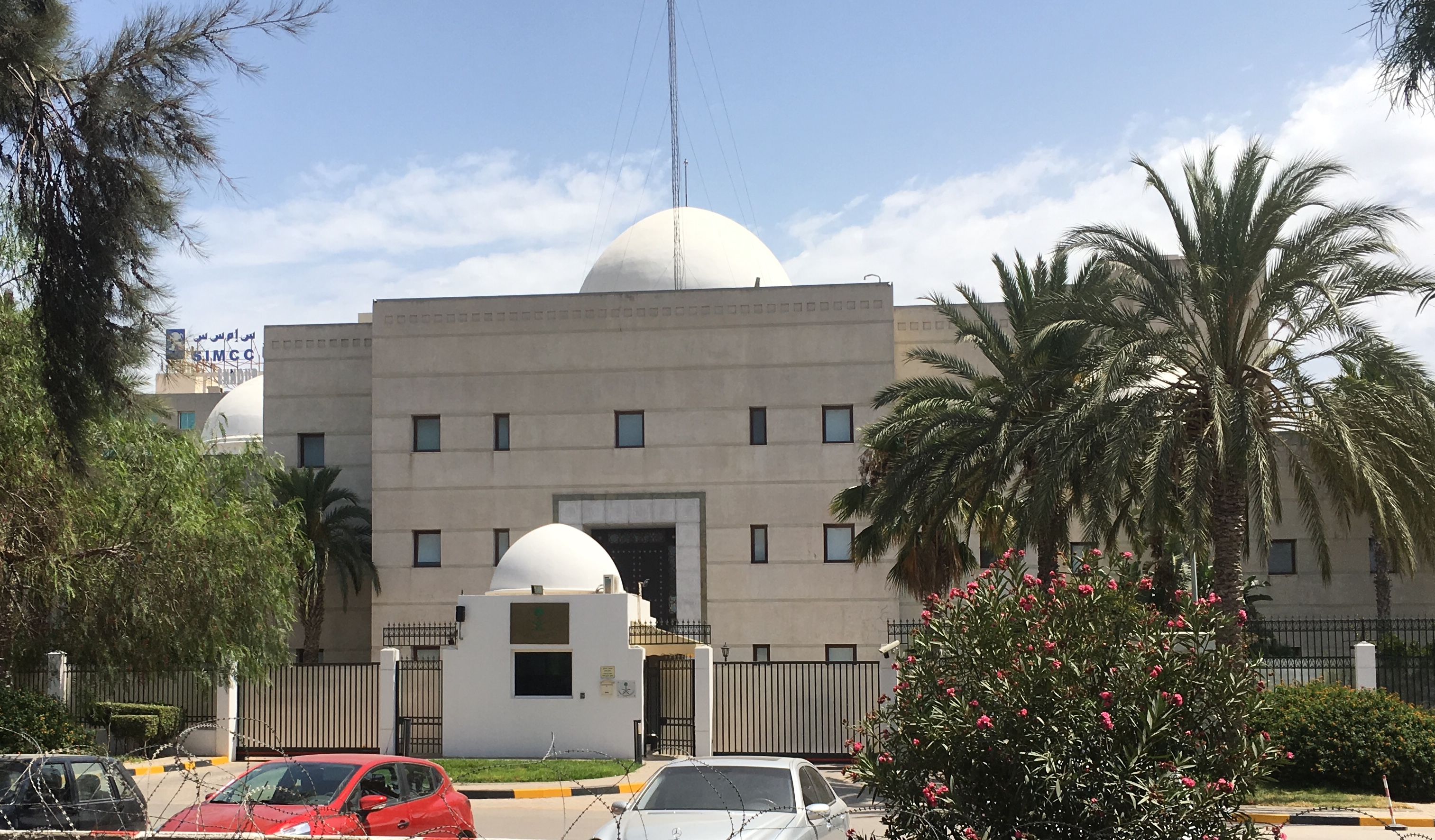
Embassy of Saudi Arabia in Tunis

Both two nations have increased significant cooperation since the independence of Tunisia from France. The Saudi Kingdom has attempted to increase its official religious ideology of Wahhabism into Tunisia.

After the Tunisian Revolution in 2011 ousted President Zine El Abidine Ben Ali, Saudi Arabia granted asylum for Zine Ben Ali, who himself is a long time friend of the Saudi regime, which supports Tunisia's recovery. The Tunisian government has demanded the Saudi Government extradite back to Tunisia for trial.

Tunisia's relations with Saudi Arabia became strained with the ascension of Mohammed Bin Salman as Saudi Crown Prince, as Saudi Arabia was hostile toward the Arab Spring, which started in Tunisia. In November 2018, on a trip to Tunisia, Mohammed Bin Salman was met with protests from locals in the wake of the murder of Jamal Khashoggi.

In 2019 the Saudi king, Salman bin Abdulaziz, visited Tunisia at the invitation of President Essebsi.

== See also ==
- Foreign relations of Saudi Arabia
- Foreign relations of Tunisia
