= Malta–Tunisia relations =

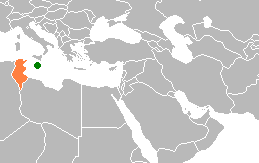
- Malta: Tunisia

Malta–Tunisia relations are bilateral relations between Malta and Tunisia. The two countries established diplomatic relations on 21 December 1967, following Malta's independence in 1964. Malta has an embassy in Tunis and Tunisia has an embassy in Valletta, and both countries are full members of the Union for the Mediterranean. Maltese and Tunisian Arabic are very similar languages. The two countries share long historical links.

== Modern Relations ==
In 2012, the government of Malta announced efforts to increase trade relations between the two countries and the two governments currently have 3 agreements covering the temporary employment of Tunisians in Malta.

On 10 July 2023, Maltese Prime Minister Robert Abela visited Tunisia. In Carthage, he had separate talks with Tunisian President Kais Saied and Prime Minister Najla Bouden to discuss renewable energy, migration, and bilateral relations. Abela and Saied also talked about the current EU-Tunisia negotiations on a comprehensive package of partnerships aimed at enhancing trade and economic relations, a partnership in energy, migration, and people-to-people interactions.

== See also ==
- Foreign relations of Malta
- Foreign relations of Tunisia
