= Pakistan–Tunisia relations =

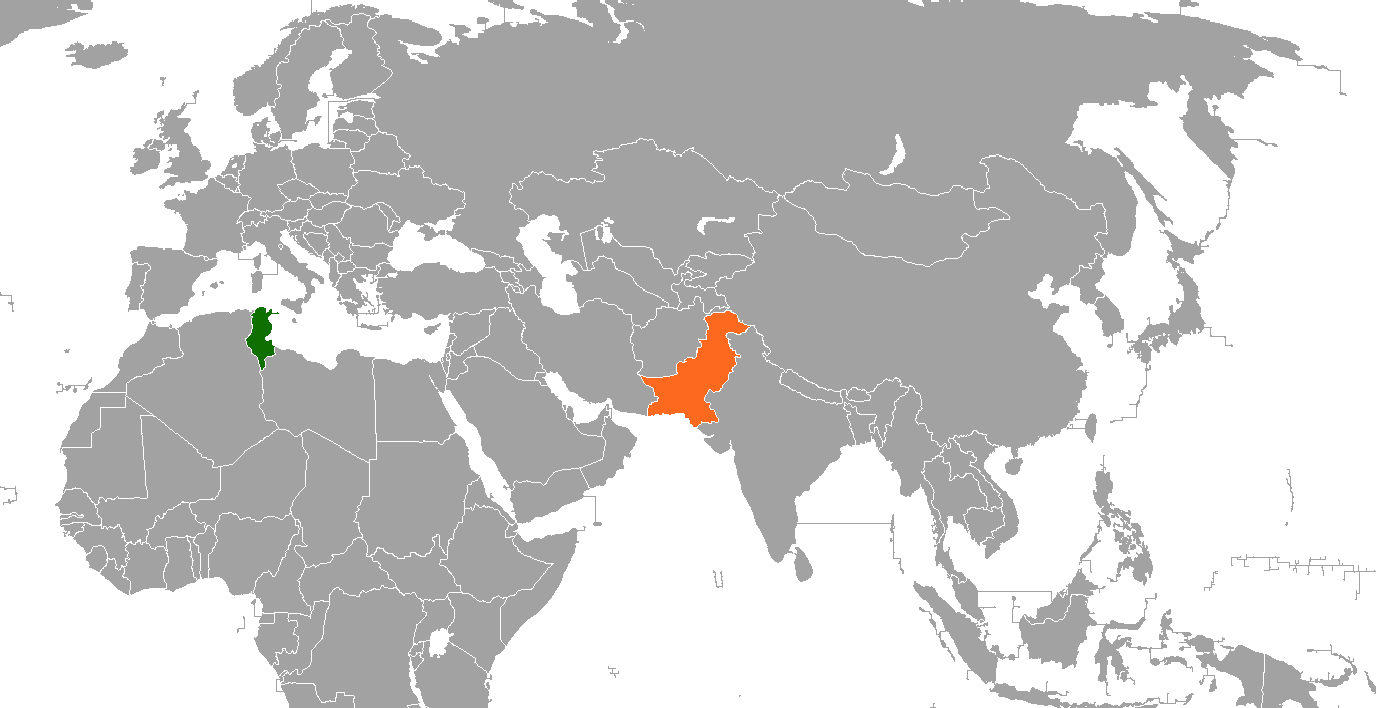
- Tunisia: Pakistan

Pakistan–Tunisia relations refer to bilateral relations between Pakistan and Tunisia. A number of framework agreements have been concluded between the two countries in the spheres of trade, tourism, culture, information and industries. Both countries are members of the Organisation of Islamic Cooperation, Non-Aligned Movement and Group of 77. Pakistan has an embassy in Tunis and Tunisia has an embassy in Islamabad.

== History ==
Diplomatic relations between both states were established in 1957. Pakistan opened its embassy in Tunis in 1958 at the Charges d' Affaires level which was later upgraded to that of Ambassador/Plenipotentiary in 1964. Tunisia introduced its embassy in Islamabad in 1980.

For its part, Tunisia has backed Pakistan in the Kashmir conflict but insomuch that it does not antagonize India, with whom it has fostered significant trade relations.

== Bilateral relations ==
There exists also a long tradition of collaboration between the two countries in international organizations particularly at the United Nations, the OIC and NAM in terms of lending support to each other's stance and candidatures .

In 2005, when a deadly earthquake struck the Muzaffarabad region of Pakistan, Tunisia sent a C-130 carrying 14 tons of relief supplies, including food, blankets and medical supplies to Pakistan.

== High level visits ==
Pakistani Prime Minister Zulfikar Ali Bhutto visited in January 1972. while Prime Minister Benazir Bhutto; and, Nawaz Sharif - also in his capacity as Prime Minister - toured Tunisia in May 1990 and February 1991 respectively. The last bilateral VVIP tour occurred when Pakistani President, Pervez Musharraf, was invited to Tunisia in July 2003. On the other hand, no VVIP tour has materialized from Tunisia although leaders of both nations interact at multilateral fora. Tunisian Foreign Minister Habib Chatty represented his country at the Second OIC Summit which was organized in Lahore in February 1974.

== Pakistan-Tunisia Friendship Association ==
This forum has been in existence since the mid-70s and is mandated with increasing bilateral goodwill and affinity through cultural, trade and social interaction.

Tunisia celebrated Pakistan-Africa Friendship Day on June 26, 2021, in Tunis.

== See also ==
- Foreign relations of Pakistan
- Foreign relations of Tunisia
