= Poland–Tunisia relations =

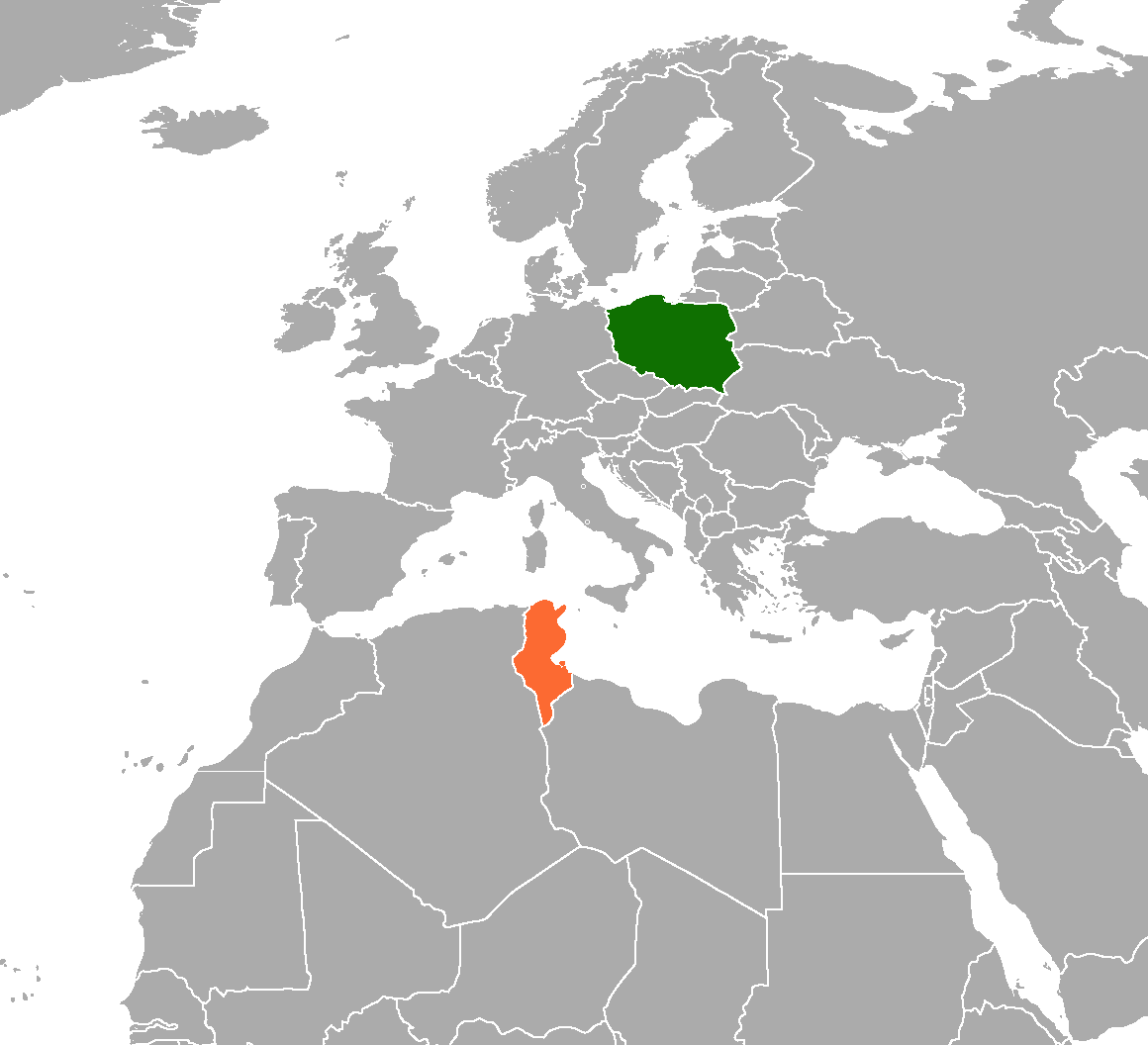
- Poland: Tunisia

Poland–Tunisia relations are bilateral relations between Poland and Tunisia. Both nations are full members of the World Trade Organization, the Union for the Mediterranean and the United Nations.

== History ==
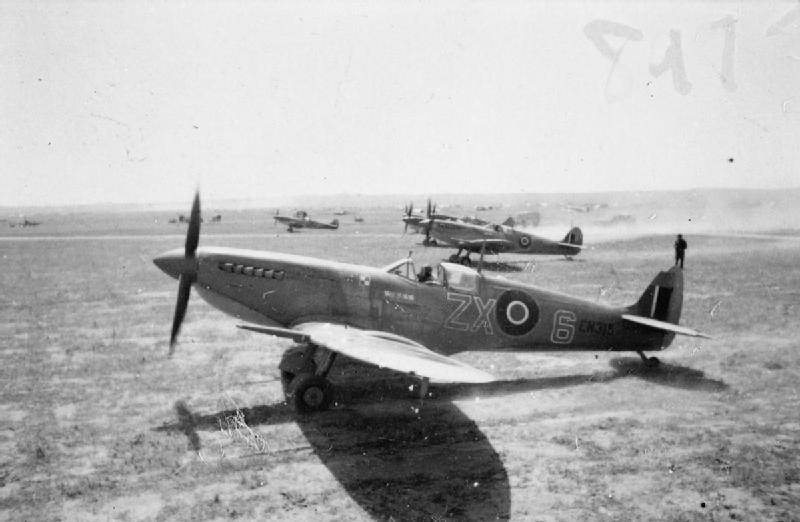
Spitfires of the Polish Fighting Team at Goubrine Airfield in 1943

An honorary consulate of Poland was established in Tunis in 1932, and elevated to a consulate in 1943, however, it was closed in 1945.

Polish and French-led Tunisian troops both fought against Nazi Germany in World War II. Tunisian prisoners of war were held by the Germans alike Polish and other Allied POWs in the Stalag II-B and Stalag II-D POW camps, located in Czarne and Stargard, respectively. Both Polish and Tunisian POWs were subjected to poor treatment by the Germans, who regarded them as "racially inferior". The Polish Fighting Team fought against Germany in Tunisia in 1943. Poles and Tunisians were part of the large Allied coalition in the Battle of Monte Cassino of 1944.

Poland recognized Tunisia in 1956, shortly after the Tunisian declaration of independence. Bilateral relations were established in 1959.

Tunisia appointed its first Ambassador to Poland Ahmed Mestiri on August 1960. He presented his letter of credence and received accreditation from the Chairman of the Council of State Aleksander Zawadzki at Belweder Palace on December 1960.

The first agreement for economic cooperation between Poland and Tunisia was ratified in Tunis on November 1960. It was followed by an agreement for scientific and technical cooperation that was negotiated and signed, on behalf of Tunisia, by Ahmed Mestiri in Warsow on 16 September 1961.

Later, a cultural cooperation agreement between Poland and Tunisia was signed in Tunis in 1966.

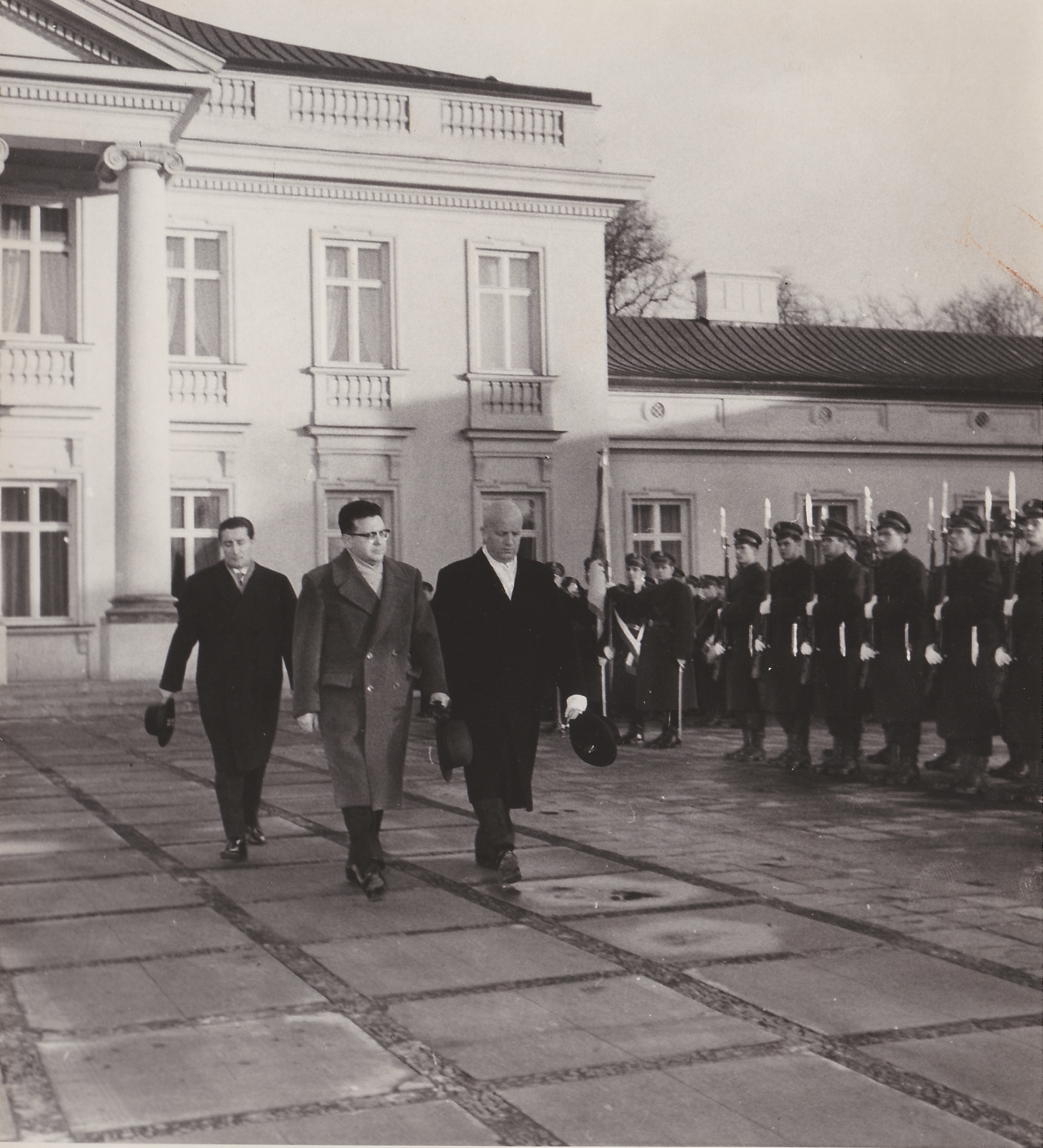
Tunisia's first Ambassador to Poland Ahmed Mestiri arriving at Belweder Palace for the Presentation of Credentials ceremony.

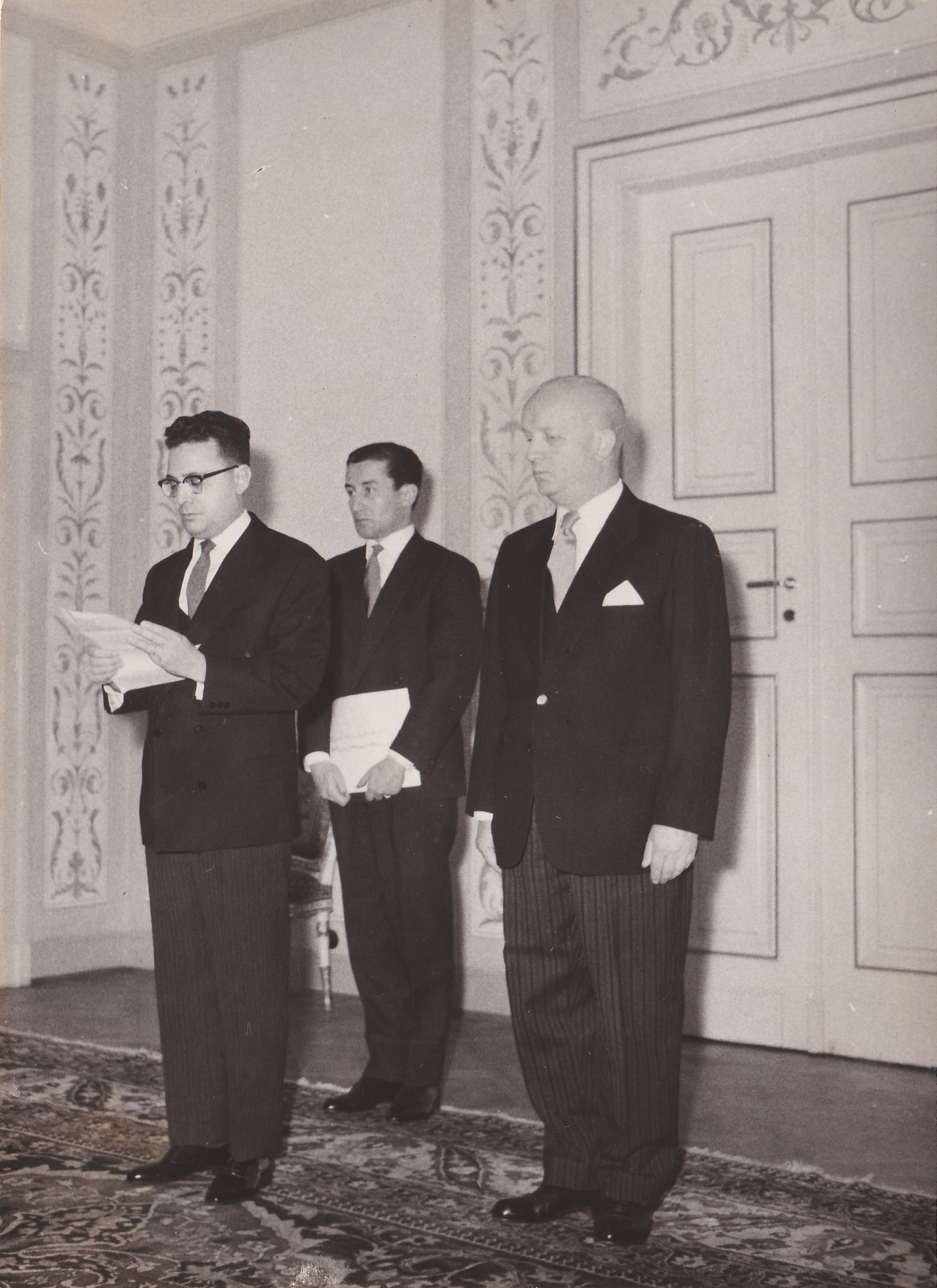
Ahmed Mestiri presenting his Letter of Credence at Belweder Palace.

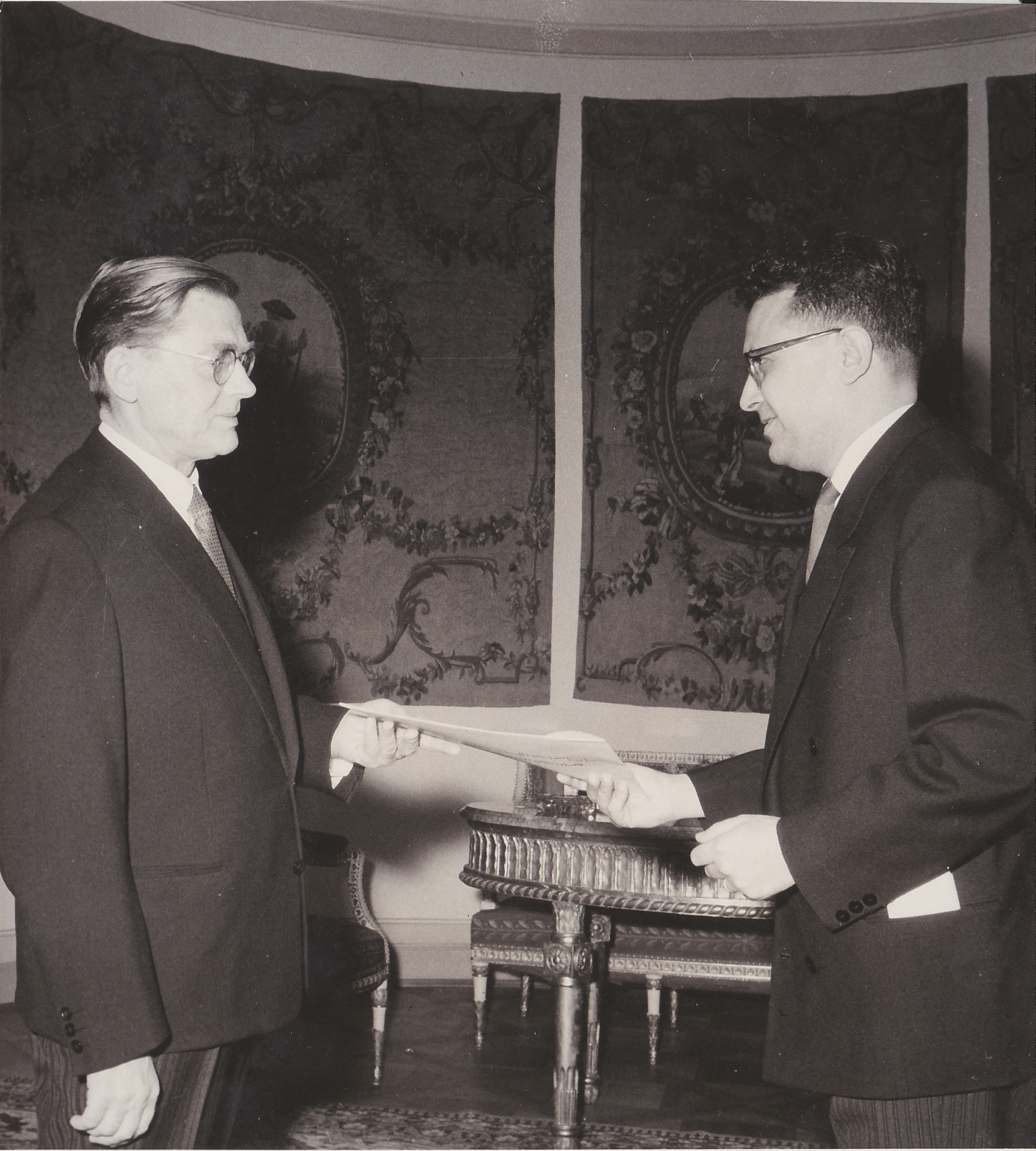
Poland's Head of State Aleksander Zawadzki granting official accreditation to Ahmed Mestiri.

Future Tunisian President and dictator Zine El Abidine Ben Ali was an ambassador of Tunisia to Poland from 1980 to 1984.

In 1993, a double tax avoidance agreement was signed between the two countries in Tunis.

In 2000, Tunisian President Zine El Abidine Ben Ali paid an official visit to Poland.

== Modern relations ==
Following the Tunisian Revolution of 2010–2011, Tunisia sought Poland's help in democratizing the country and dealing with the ousted dictatorship. The first study visit of Tunisian officials and NGOs to Poland took place in 2012. Further such Polish-Tunisian meetings were held in the following years, and in 2013, Łukasz Kamiński, President of the Polish Institute of National Remembrance (IPN) visited Tunis and participated in a seminar regarding Polish experience in transitional justice. Polish experts assisted Tunisians in drafting of the act on transitional justice. In 2014, the President of the IPN was present at the inauguration of Tunisia's Truth and Dignity Commission in Tunis.

Three Polish nationals were killed in the 2015 Bardo National Museum attack in Tunis.

In October 2021, Poland donated some four tons of medical equipment and supplies, including ventilators and pulse oximeters, to Tunisia to help combat the COVID-19 pandemic in Tunisia.

== Diplomatic missions ==
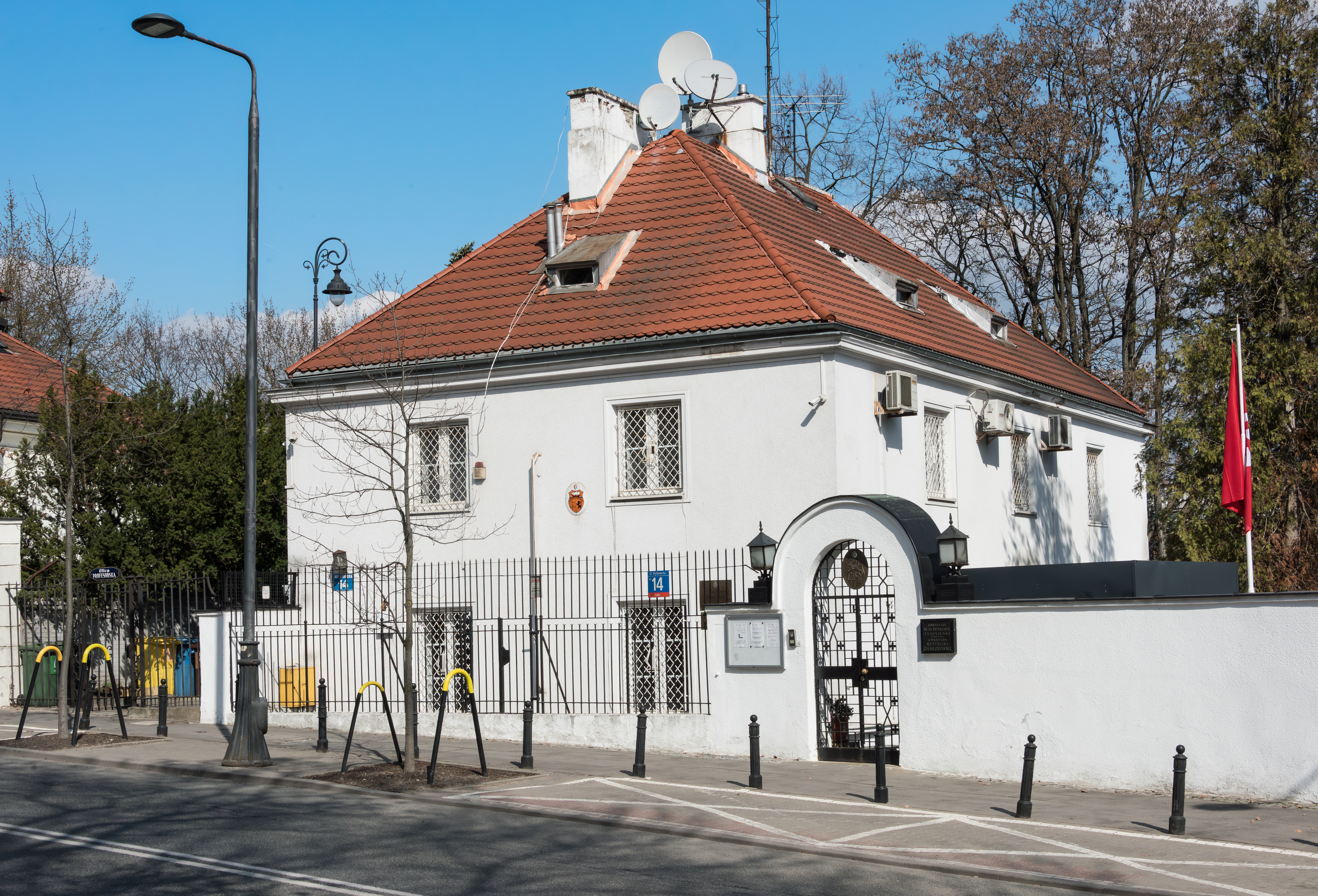
Embassy of Tunisia in Warsaw

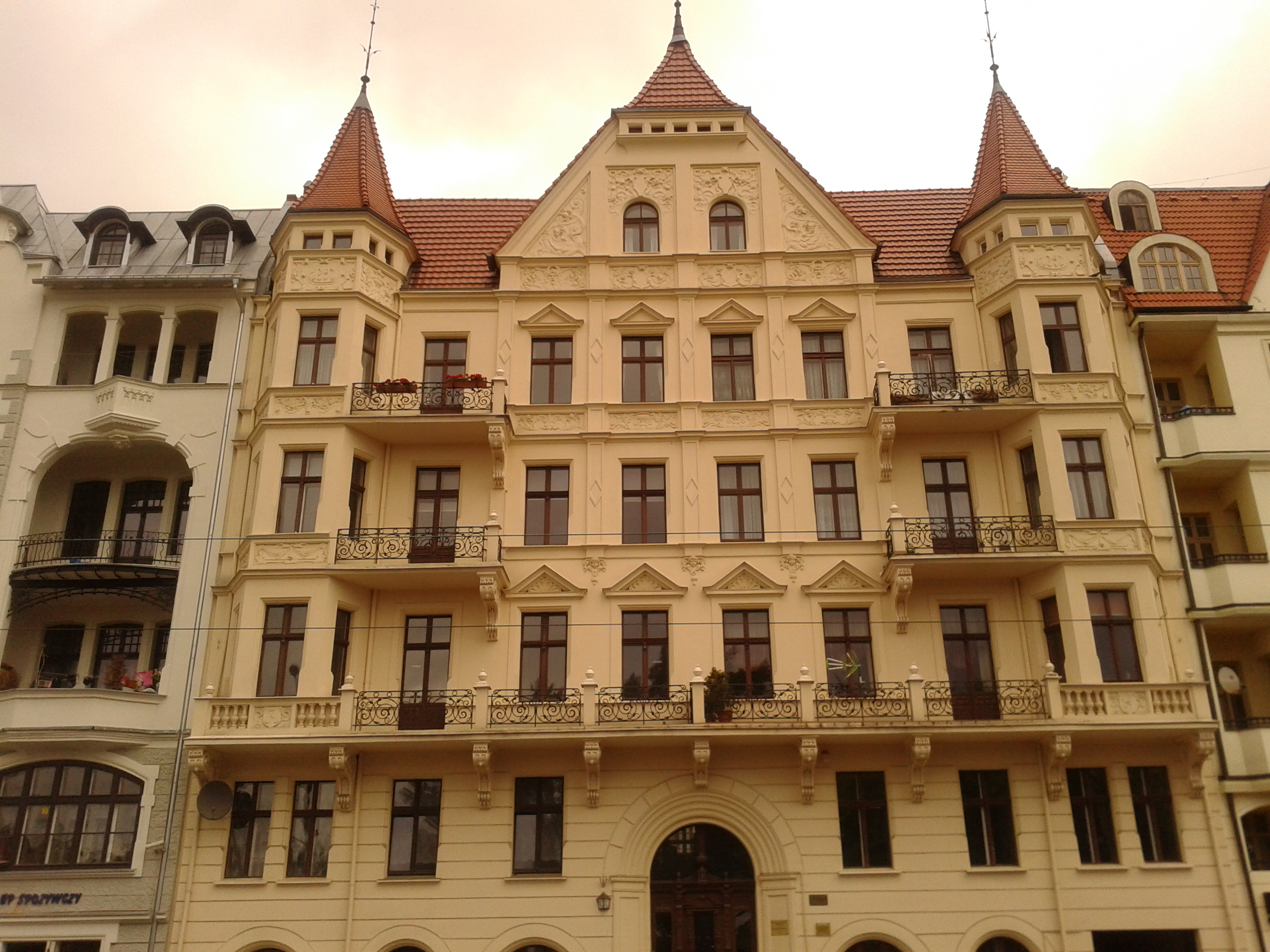
Honorary Consulate of Tunisia in Toruń

- Poland has an embassy in Tunis and an honorary consulate in Sousse.
- Tunisia has an embassy in Warsaw and an honorary consulate in Toruń.

== See also ==
- Foreign relations of Poland
- Foreign relations of Tunisia
