= Algeria–Tunisia relations =

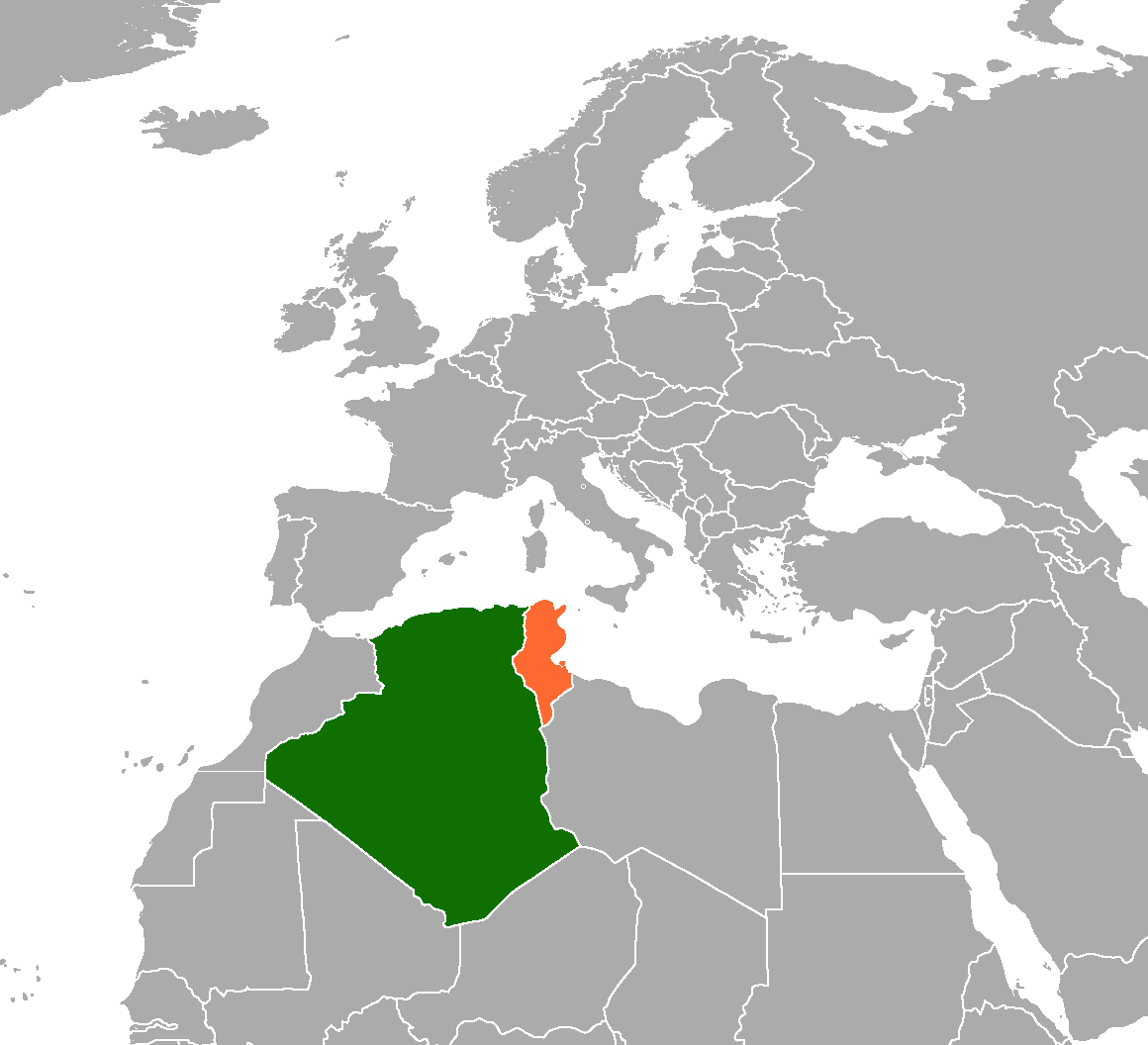
- Algeria: Tunisia

Algeria and the Tunisia are both predominantly Muslim nations in the Maghreb region in North Africa. Both countries have historic dynasties primarily focused in Algiers and Tunis that became specialized in piracy and global trade. Eventually these dynasties fell under the influence of the French in the 19th century. Both remained under French control until Tunisian independence became official in 1956 and Algeria became independent after the conclusion of the Algerian War in 1962. Since independence both countries have had periods of antagonism over issues such as border security and terrorism, however it appears that both countries are trending towards a positive relationship. The Algerian-Tunisian border is around 1034 km (642 mi) long and was officially agreed upon in 1960. Both countries are members of the African Union, Arab League, Organisation of Islamic Cooperation, Union for the Mediterranean and the United Nations.

== Relations pre-colonization ==
Over the years the Regencies of Tunis and Algiers got into many conflicts. The nature of these conflicts often centered around the tributary system and the harsh taxes that Algeria posed on Tunisia. Another point of conflict was that Tunisia was dominated by Ottomans while Algiers remained relatively autonomous and repelled constant Ottoman invasions. The conflicts primarily happened in the 17th and 18th century and subsided with the total Ottoman takeover of the region.

=== Rise of Husaynid dynasty ===
The Deys of Algeria launched frequent attacks against the Beys of Tunisia to achieve autonomy in the region (see Tunisian-Algerian Wars). In 1705 they attempted to launch one final attack to overtake Tunis. This attack was repelled by Al-Husayn I ibn Ali and led to the formation of the Husainid dynasty. The deys of Algiers eventually incited the overthrowing of Husayn l by grooming his nephew, Abu l-Hasan Ali I to be an Algiers friendly ruler of Tunisia. Eventually ‘Ali Pasha gained control in 1735 and began to start paying tributes back to Algiers. However this support would be short lived after the Dey supported another overturning of power in 1745 now supporting Husayn l's sons to take back the throne from ‘Ali Pasha. This attempt failed and resulted in ‘Ali Pasha remaining leader of Tunis until he was eventually overthrown by the sons of Husayn in 1756.

=== Reconciliation of the Husaynids ===
The fall of ‘Ali Pasha was ushered in not only by Algeria but by Husayn b. ‘Ali's sons. Algeria officially ransacked Tunis in 1756 with the sons help but the Algerians had the goal to remain in control of the city. Eventually the eldest son, Muhammad, was able to ward off Algeria and was also able to avoid paying tribute on account that both countries were under Ottoman rule. This left Tunisia on equal grounds with Algeria and resulted in Tunisia's economy growing along with its capability to rule its interior. This newfound prosperity would soon be challenged at the emergence of Hammuda ibn Ali and Algeria's disliking towards his desire to end the economic exploitation of Tunisia still occurring.

=== Hammuda Bey repels Algerians but falls to French ===
Hammuda Bey was a ruler of Tunisia who vehemently opposed subjugation from Algeria and other European powers. In 1806 he began to opposed the tributary system which had been in place since 1756 along with forming an army to defend against Algeria. Hammuda launched an offensive on the Algerian city of Constantine in 1807 and again defended Tunis from an Algerian counterattack. Algeria would attack again in 1811 and 1813 but was repelled both times. After both nations were crippled economically by the crackdown of piracy in the Mediterranean, it made them extremely susceptible to foreign influence. The French eventually had enough of Algiers and launched a siege of the city in 1830 that would last until 1962. Tunisia remained neutral in the affair and even profited through the weakening of the Algiers regency and improved trade with the French. This profit would not last long though as the French began to abuse their power in the region more and more until eventually they took complete control in 1881.

== Relations after decolonization ==
Tunisia and Algeria both experienced independence differently which resulted in the rise of different philosophies in each country. Tunisia was able to gain its independence relatively peacefully, and once it had gotten its autonomy it was eager to work with European powers and the United States to create better relations. Contrast this with the bloody Algerian War of independence and the creation of a state that was headed by the National Liberation Front (Algeria) who was a decidedly socialist party. This resulted in Algeria aligning itself with the Soviet Union originally while taking a combative stance against the United States. These differences created issues between Tunisia and Algeria, but eventually as Algeria got stronger both politically and militarily it was clear Tunisia would have to conform.

=== Cold War era relations ===
Smaller and in a more precarious position vis-à-vis Libya, Tunisia has consistently made efforts to align with Algeria. Tunisia was the first of these two countries to gain independence in 1956. Tunisia supported Algeria in their war of independence by letting members of the FLN use Tunisian towns as bases of operation, which eventually led to the bombing of the village of Sakiet Sidi Youssef. A rift between these two nations had begun to form however, as Tunisia was backed by the United States while Algeria was supportive of the Soviet Union. This had created growing security concerns in Tunisia as Algeria continued to grow more anti American. Eventually these concerns were quelled as Algeria signed a pact with Morocco in 1969 and later with Tunisia in 1970. This agreement resulted in Tunisia reversing its position on the Western Sahara, settling border disputes with Algeria, and agreeing to have Algerian oil transported to the Tunisian port of Skhira so as not to antagonize Algerian authorities. Additionally, Tunisia was the first nation to sign the Treaty of Fraternity and Concord with Algeria, in 1983. The treaty increased Algerian Tunisian relations while uniting the countries against Morocco and their claims in Western Sahara.

=== Economic ventures ===
Throughout Algeria's independent history, it has joined in a number of economic ventures with Tunisia, including the transnational pipeline running from Algeria through Tunisia to Italy in 1983. In 1987 the departure from power in Tunisia of President Habib Bourguiba and his replacement by the more diplomatic Zine el Abidine Ben Ali brought the two nations closer again. This resulted in the formation of Arab Maghreb Union in February 1989, to which Tunisia and Algeria were both founding members. The goal of this agreement was to improve the economic position of North African countries while supporting free trade and economic movement across the region. While addressing the Maghribi summit the day after signing the pact, leader of Tunisia at the time Zine El Abidine Ben Ali said this about the newly formed alliance, “This declaration in itself represents a core political choice whose features became clear on the agreement that defines the legal and institutional framework for unified Maghreb action.” This pact was essential for both parties, It provided Tunisia a guarantee that Algerian hegemony in the region would not be realized while for Algeria it provided political stability and allowed them to regain support from the people after social unrest in 1988.

== Relations After the Arab Spring ==
The Tunisian Revolution resulted in longtime President of Tunisia Zine El Abidine Ben Ali being overthrown when the Islamists represented by the Ennahda Movement took the reins of power in Carthage. This has resulted in general instability in the region and the rise of multiple terrorist groups who have led attacks against both countries. Algeria, who was relatively unaffected by the Arab Spring, has worked with the Tunisian government to create more security along the border while actively fighting terrorist groups in Tunisia.

Due to the weak central government after the revolution, the Tunisian-Algerian border was extremely weak. The borders security originally relied on the deals made by former President Zine El Abidine Ben Ali with various groups. After his ousting, the power vacuum led to the unregulated trafficking of weapons, smuggling and taking control of border crossings by force. The relations between the two countries then become blurry after numerous accusations from Tunisian local voices and politicians to the Algerian regime and intelligence regarding the terrorist ambush on a Tunisian Army patrol close to the borders on Monday, 29 July 2013. Another incident that had also challenged the security of the Tunisian-Algerian border was a terrorist attack at the Tiguentourine gas facility in January 2013, this attack has been linked to Tunisian and Libyan terrorist groups . These incidents resulted in the creation of a military buffer zone between the two borders beginning in August 2013. Later, both countries entered a bilateral security agreement in 2014 with the goal of training both militaries to deal with internal terrorist threats.

== Relations in the present day ==
Today, Tunisia is led by President Kais Saied since 2019. Algeria is led by President Abdelmadjid Tebboune and his party the National Liberation Front.Both of these countries have attempted to maintain good relations.

During the COVID-19 pandemic, Algeria closed land borders to Tunisia in 2020 to prevent the spread of the virus. On 6 July 2022, Algerian President Abdelmadjid Tebboune announced to reopen the borders on 15 July.

In September 2022, Tunisia invited the leader of the Polisario Front to Tunis in order to discuss the current situation in Western Sahara. Although Tunisia has remained neutral in the conflict, this action has been seen as a vote of support for Algeria.

On February 11, 2023, over 200 Tunisians were refused entry back into Tunisia after activist Amira Bouraoui escaped from Algeria to Tunisia where she was then able to escape to France. Despite Tunisia more than likely aiding in the escape, Algeria still supports Kais Saied and wants to keep up a strong relationship between the countries.

In March 2025, Algeria, Tunisia and notably Libya, announced the signing of a memorandum of understanding for the implementation of an electricity interconnection project between the three North African countries.

== Resident diplomatic missions ==
- Algeria has an embassy in Tunis and consulates in El Kef and Gafsa.
- Tunisia has an embassy in Algiers, a consulate-general in Annaba and a consulate in Tébessa.
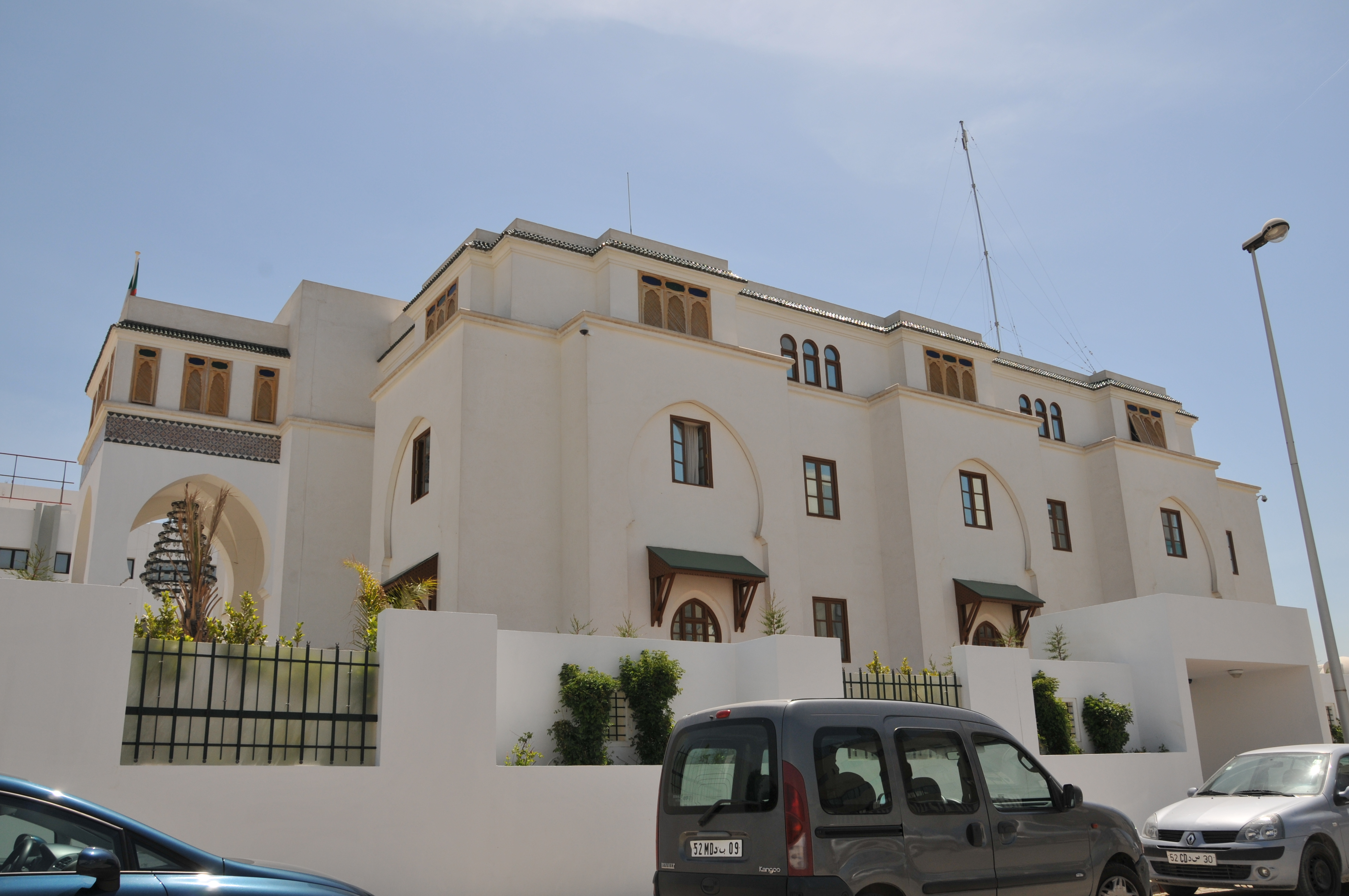
Embassy of Algeria in Tunis

== See also ==
- Foreign relations of Algeria
- Foreign relations of Tunisia
