= Morocco–Tunisia relations =

- Morocco: Tunisia

Relations between the Maghreb countries of Morocco and Tunisia were first established in 1956. Both states' territory historically formed a part of the Carthaginian and Roman empires, before becoming protectorates within the French colonial empire.

Both countries are members of the Organisation of Islamic Cooperation, African Union, Arab League and Non-Aligned Movement. Morocco has an embassy in Tunis. Tunisia has an embassy in Rabat.

== Post-colonial relations ==
Immediately following their independence, a series of "nationalistic prejudices" arose in both Morocco and the then-Kingdom of Tunisia regarding their relationship with France, and both provided support to the National Liberation Front fighting in the Algerian War. Under Habib Bourguiba, Tunisia officially adopted a neutral policy regarding the Western Sahara conflict.

Following the Tunisian Revolution, interim president Moncef Marzouki made an official visit to Morocco in 2012, in part to discuss a re-establishment of the dormant Arab Maghreb Union. King Mohammed VI also visited Tunisia twice in 2014 and 2015. In January 2020, the king and newly-elected President Kais Saied exchanged a phone call.

A diplomatic crisis emerged in August 2022 following a decision made by Saied to invite Polisario Front leader Brahim Ghali, in his capacity as President of the Sahrawi Arab Democratic Republic, to attend the 8th Tokyo International Conference on African Development (TICAD) in Tunis, while also personally receiving him upon his arrival. The Moroccan government subsequently announced that it would boycott the conference, and withdrew its national team from a regional karate championship taking place in Tunis. Both countries also recalled their respective ambassadors. A statement published by the Ministry of Foreign Affairs, African Cooperation and Moroccan Expatriates accused Tunisia of "unilaterally" inviting Ghali "in violation of the process of preparation and established rules", to which Tunisia's Ministry of Foreign Affairs responded that it had "maintained its total neutrality on the Western Sahara issue in line with international law". Following continued criticism from Moroccan media, the Tunisian journalists' union denounced what it had termed a "smear campaign".

== Resident diplomatic missions ==
- Morocco has an embassy in Tunis.
- Tunisia has an embassy in Rabat.

== See also ==
- Foreign relations of Morocco
- Foreign relations of Tunisia
- Arab Maghreb Union
