= Iran–Tunisia relations =

- Iran: Tunisia

Iran and Tunisia maintain bilateral relations. Both countries are members of the Organisation of Islamic Cooperation, Group of 77 and Non-Aligned Movement. Neither country has a resident ambassador.

== Historical and modern relations ==
Tunisia is one of few Arab countries to develop good relations with Iran since the Iranian Revolution of 1979 and the establishment of the Islamic Republic. Tunisia's neutrality has given them a good image on their relations.

Tunisia was one of few Arab countries to express condolences over the 2017 Tehran attacks, and both two countries expressed that there would be no limit on increased cooperation between the two nations.

Tunisia acts as a neutral and balanced power to mediate the standoff between Iran and Saudi Arabia.

== See also ==
- Foreign relations of Iran
- Foreign relations of Tunisia
