= Russia–Tunisia relations =

- Tunisia: Russia

Russia–Tunisia relations (Russian: Российско-тунисские отношения; Arabic: العلاقات التونسية الروسية) are foreign relations between Russia and Tunisia. Both countries had established diplomatic relations in 1956, when Tunisia got its independence. Russia has an embassy in Tunis, and Tunisia has an embassy in Moscow.

== Bilateral relations ==
Diplomatic relations between the Soviet Union and Tunisia were established July 11, 1956. On December 25, 1991 Tunisia announced the recognition of Russia. The Millennium Summit in New York was the first meeting in the history of Russian-Tunisian relations between the Presidents of Russia and Tunisia. In November 2005, the Minister of Foreign Affairs Sergey Lavrov visited Tunisia as part of a working visit to the Maghreb. It was also visited by the President of the Russian Federation Chamber of Commerce Yevgeny Primakov (November 2006), Chairman of the Russian Audit Chamber Sergei Stepashin (December 2006), the head of Rossport V.A. Fetisov (May 2008), Vice President State Duma N.V. Gerasimova (May 2010), the Chairman of the Council of Muftis of Russia, Chairman of the Spiritual Administration of Muslims of European Russia R.I. Gainutdin (April 2010).

The basis for development of trade and economic cooperation between the two countries was established in intergovernmental agreements signed November 11, 1993 - on trade, economic, scientific and technical cooperation (mutual granting of most-favored-nation treatment in trade and economic cooperation), collaboration in the field of hydraulic engineering (continued provision of economic and technical assistance to the Republic of Tunisia on investment targets), the creation of the Tunisian-Russian Intergovernmental Commission on trade-economic and scientific-technical cooperation, cooperation in the training of professional and technical personnel. Was the most fruitful collaboration in the field of irrigation and water management in general. In particular, with the assistance of the Soviet Union and later Russia has developed and implemented by the General Scheme of runoff water to the north of the capital of Tunisia and southern regions of the country.

== Economic relations and cooperation ==
The Foreign Economic Association "Selkhozpromexport" prepared project documentation and until 2006 exercised supervision over the construction of a number of large dams (Dzhumin, Sedzhenan, Geza, Sidi al-Barak). Built the first and second line of culverts Sedzhenan - Dzhumin - Medjerda.

Under the regime of Zine El Abidine Ben Ali a plan was approved to build 2020 –2023 years. Plant capacity of 900 MW. "Rosatom" expressed willingness to engage in dialogue with a view to specifying cooperation projects. In April 2010, a delegation of SC held in Tunis Days of Russian nuclear technology.

In 2010 trade between the two countries stood at 1.047 billion (in 2009 - 752 million in 2008 - about 1.7 billion dollars). Russia's main exports to Tunisia are petroleum products, products of inorganic chemistry (sulfur, ammonia), grains (up to 2010), metal products, lumber, pulp and paper. Tunisia supplied to Russia agricultural products, seafood, textiles and clothing. On January 16, 2016 customs fees for Tunisian products exported to Russia were reduced 25%.

The Russian-Tunisian Intergovernmental Commission on Trade, Economic, Scientific and Technological Cooperation (IPC) played a special role in the development of bilateral cooperation between the two countries. The first meeting was held in March 1999, and there have been four more, the last one in October 2010. Rossiskoy chairman of the IPC is currently the Minister of Sport, Tourism and Youth Policy Vitaly Mutko.

Business communities of the two countries established the Russian-Tunisian Business Council in 2006. His co-chaired by the General Director of "Inconnect" T.V. Sadofeva and Vice President of the Tunisian Union of Industry, Commerce and Handicrafts, member of the House of Councillors of the Tunisian Parliament M. Sahraui. In 1998, it signed an agreement on the work of the Russian medical staff in health facilities Tunisia. Through FSUE "Zdraveksport" in Tunisia work 96 doctors, 29 of them Russian. The Minister of Health of Tunisia visited Moscow in 2003 and signed an interagency agreement on cooperation in the field of health.

In 1998, Moscow signed an intergovernmental agreement on cooperation in the field of tourism. After a certain slowdown in the global financial and economic crisis in 2010, the number of our tourists visiting Tunisia. According to the Tunisian data, it was about 185 thousand people. (In 2009 - 126 thousand people.). In 2006, 2007 and 2010. Visited Moscow Minister of Tourism and Handicrafts of Tunisia. The fall of 2000 after a 10-year hiatus, was re-established Society Tunisian-Russian friendship. In 2003, established the Parliamentary Friendship Group Tunis Russia.

In addition to earlier agreements on cooperation between the language educational institutions of Russia and Tunisia (IAAS, Moscow State Linguistic University and the University Institute languages of Tunisia), in 2009, the universities of Voronezh and Monastir held the second Interuniversity Scientific Conference. They received proposals from the Russian State Economic University and Voronezh State Technological Academy for partnerships with Tunisian universities. Initiated regional cooperation (agreement on the exchange of delegations between the Chamber of Nizhny Novgorod and Kursk and g. Sfaksa).

In April 2008, a few cities of Tunisia with great success Days of Culture of Tatarstan (the official delegation led by Deputy Prime Minister and Minister of Culture Z.R.Valeeva). In May 2008, between the two countries signed Executive program of cultural cooperation for 2008–2010. In December, during the visit of the Minister of Culture of the Russian Federation A.Avdeev signed a cultural cooperation program for 2011 – 2013 years. between the Ministry of Culture of the Russian Federation and the Ministry of Culture and cultural heritage of Tunisia. Representatives of the Russian creative teams over the years has been involved in international festivals in Tunisia in various art genres (opera, theater, folklore). By working closely with the Ministry of Culture and cultural heritage of Tunisia in the capital and around the country held Russian exhibitions, concerts, film screenings. In March 2010, in Tunis and Sousse last week, Russian movie involving CEO kinokontserna "Mosfilm" K.G. Shahnazarova. Progressively developing scientific cooperation. Working contacts between the Institute of Oriental Studies and the Kazan State University, on the one hand, and the Arab League Educational, Cultural and Scientific Organization (ALECSO), on the other. 2 thousand Tunisians - graduates of Soviet and Russian universities - are united in the association.

In October 2002, in Tunis, on 6 th all-Arab conference of graduates of Soviet and Russian universities, which was created by Arab Union of the Russian (Soviet) higher education institutions, with headquarters in Tunis. Over the last 100 years of Tunisian citizens are received each year to study at universities in Moscow, St. Petersburg, Ryazan, Nizhny Novgorod and other Russian cities. The bulk of them are trained on a commercial basis. Simultaneously, the Tunisian Islamic theological university "Zeitun" by the Tunisian government scholarships, provides for the citizens of Russia, annually admit up to four students. Was a process of actively promoting the Russian language. He is currently being studied in four high schools and 26 high schools in 16 cities. Between the Foundation "Russian world", and the Higher Institute of Languages of Tunis, where there are currently 200 students learning Russian as a specialty, agreed to establish a Center for the Study of Russian. Work on conservation in Tunisia cultural and historical heritage of Russia, including the memory of the Black Sea fleet. Profile has been established with the cooperation of local authorities in Tunis, Bizerte and Menzel Bourguiba. Tunisian side has provided diversified assistance related to the improvement and maintenance of the graves of Russian officers and sailors. Such assistance, in particular, had the Governorate of Bizerte in Tunisia during July 2010 commemorative events to mark the voyage on the 90th anniversary of the outcome of the Russian army and civilian refugees from the Crimea. The issue of opening a museum g. Bizerta Black Sea Squadron based at home, the residence A.A.Manshteyn-Shira (elder of the Russian community, almost all her life in g. Bizerta, died in December 2009).

In September 2023, Russia and Tunisia sign bilateral cooperation, such as technology and civil nuclear energy.

== See also ==
- List of ambassadors of Russia to Tunisia
- Foreign relations of Russia
- Foreign relations of Tunisia
