= India–Tunisia relations =

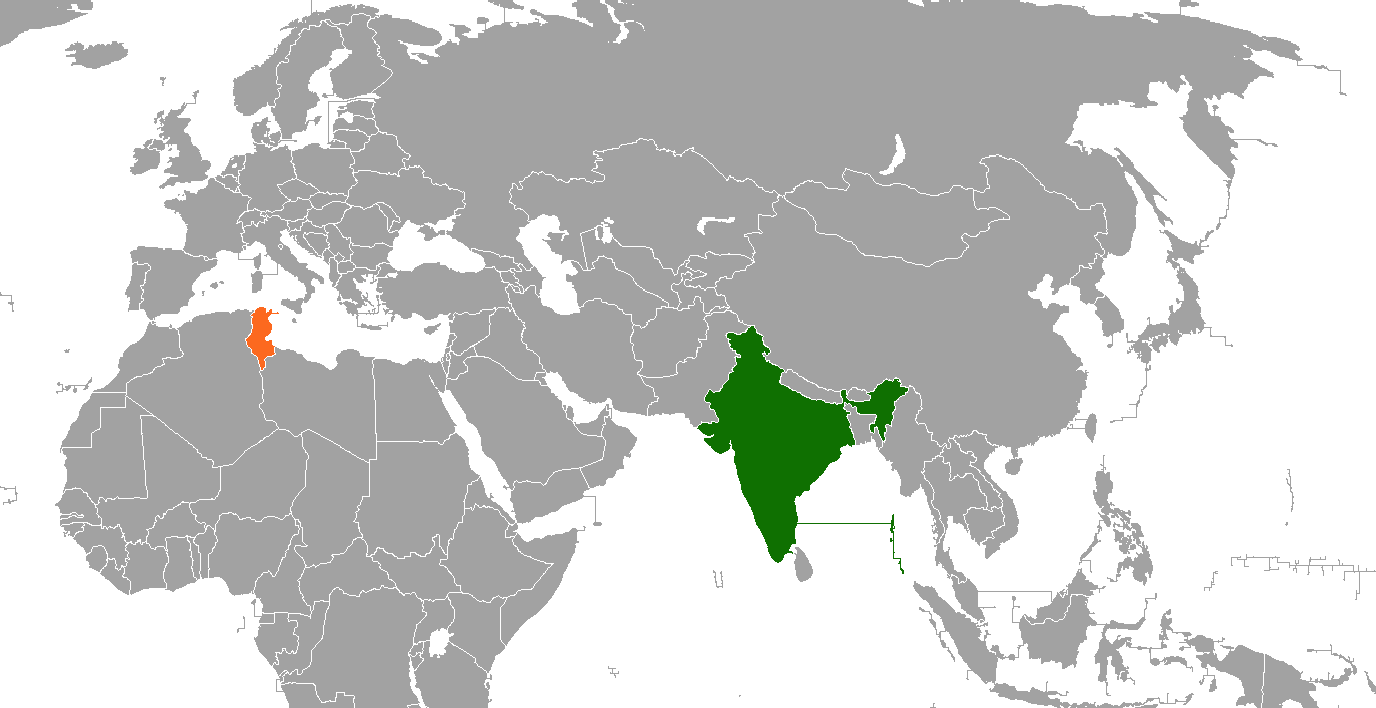
- India: Tunisia

India–Tunisia relations refers to the bilateral relations between India and Tunisia. India has an embassy in Tunis. Tunisia has an embassy in New Delhi. Both countries are members of the Non-Aligned Movement.

== History ==
Diplomatic relations between India and Tunisia were established in 1958. Historically, Tunisian leaders have praised India's democracy and have openly acknowledged India's support for Tunisian independence, while supporting India's annexation of Goa as well. In 1963, the first resident Indian diplomatic mission in Tunis was established at the level of Chargé d'affaires. This was upgraded to an Ambassador-level embassy in 1976. Tunisia opened its embassy in New Delhi in 1981.

Indian Prime Minister Indira Gandhi visited Tunisia in April 1984, and Prime Minister Narasimha Rao in 1992. Former Prime Minister I.K. Gujral visited the country in 1999. The First Lady of Tunisia Wassila Bourguiba visited India in November 1982, followed by Prime Minister Mohamed Mzali in 1983.

The Chief of the Tunisian Navy Chief attended the International Fleet Review held in Visakhapatnam in February 2016. During Vice-President Hamid Ansari's state visit to Tunisia in August 2016, the two countries signed two MoUs to promote handicrafts, and information technology and digital economy. Ansari also met with Prime Minister Habib Essid and also agreed to increase co-operation in combating terrorism. Essid declared, "Our relations are very strong, our views are similar". He also confirmed that Tunisia supported India's candidature for a permanent seat in a reformed United Nations Security Council.

A statue of Mahatma Gandhi was unveiled at the campus of Manouba University by the Governor of Manouba Governorate on 4 October 2016. This was the first statue of an Indian person in Tunisia.

== Economic relations ==
=== Trade ===
Bilateral trade between the two countries totaled US$562.65 million in 2012, but declined to $398.88 million in 2013 due to political unrest and strikes by mine workers in Tunisia. Bilateral trade in 2015 amounted to $340.25 million.

Tunisia has been a reliable source of phosphate exports to India since the 1950s. India purchases over 50% of Tunisia's total phosphoric acid exports. Di-Ammonium Phosphate (DAP) is another major Indian import from Tunisia. The major commodities exported from India to Tunisia are knocked-down kits, automobiles, electrical items, cotton, mechanical engines, organic chemical products, rubber, rice, coffee, and spices.

=== Investment ===
Tunisia-India Fertilizer SA (TIFERT), a joint venture between Indian and Tunisian companies, was founded in 2006 and began operating in May 2013. India's Coromandel Fertilizers Ltd and the Gujarat State Fertilizers Ltd own a 30% stake in the company, while the remaining 70% is held equally by two Tunisian Government-owned firms. As of 2016, TIFERT is worth $450 million and produces 360,000 tonnes of phosphoric acid annually. The firm began exporting phosphoric acid to India in July 2013.

Jyoti Structures and KEC International Ltd. operate in Tunisia and have been involved in the erection of electric transmission lines. Indian automaker Mahindra opened a pickup truck assembly plant in Sousse on 30 October 2013. The plant was Mahindra's first assembly facility in Africa. In June 2015, TATA Motors began producing pickup trucks in the country in collaboration with Tunisian firms Le Moteur and Icar. Dabur invested $7 million to open a toothpaste manufacturing facility in Tunisia.

The two countries have signed numerous bilateral agreements concerning trade, science and technology, counter-terrorism, organized crime, drug trafficking, nuclear energy, agriculture, cultural cooperation, communication and information technology.

Citizens of Tunisia are eligible for scholarships under the Indian Technical and Economic Cooperation Programme and the Indian Council for Cultural Relations.

In February 2021, on the sidelines of the India Tunisia Business Forum, Indian Economic Trade Organization (IETO) and the Tunisia Africa Business Council (TABC) signed an MOU to establish the India Tunisia Business Council (ITBC) in the presence of Indian Ambassador in Tunisia Mr.Puneet Kundal, Ambassador Riadh Essid from the MFA Tunisia, and the Joint Secretary of MEA, Govt of India, Mr.Srikar Reddy.

== Indians in Tunisia ==
As of December 2016, an estimated 120 Indian citizens and people of Indian origin reside in Tunisia, including a few families that have lived in Tunisia for several decades. Most of the Indian community is employed by Indian and foreign companies operating in the country. A few work as staff of the African Development Bank located in Tunis.

Several Indians fled to Tunisia to escape the Libyan Civil War. The Indian government launched Operation Safe Homecoming to evacuate its nationals from Libya. Following further unrest in the country in 2014, India utilized the Tunisian ports of Djerba and Tunis to evacuate over 3,500 Indian citizens fleeing Libya.

== See also ==
- Foreign relations of India
- Foreign relations of Tunisia
