= Greece–Tunisia relations =

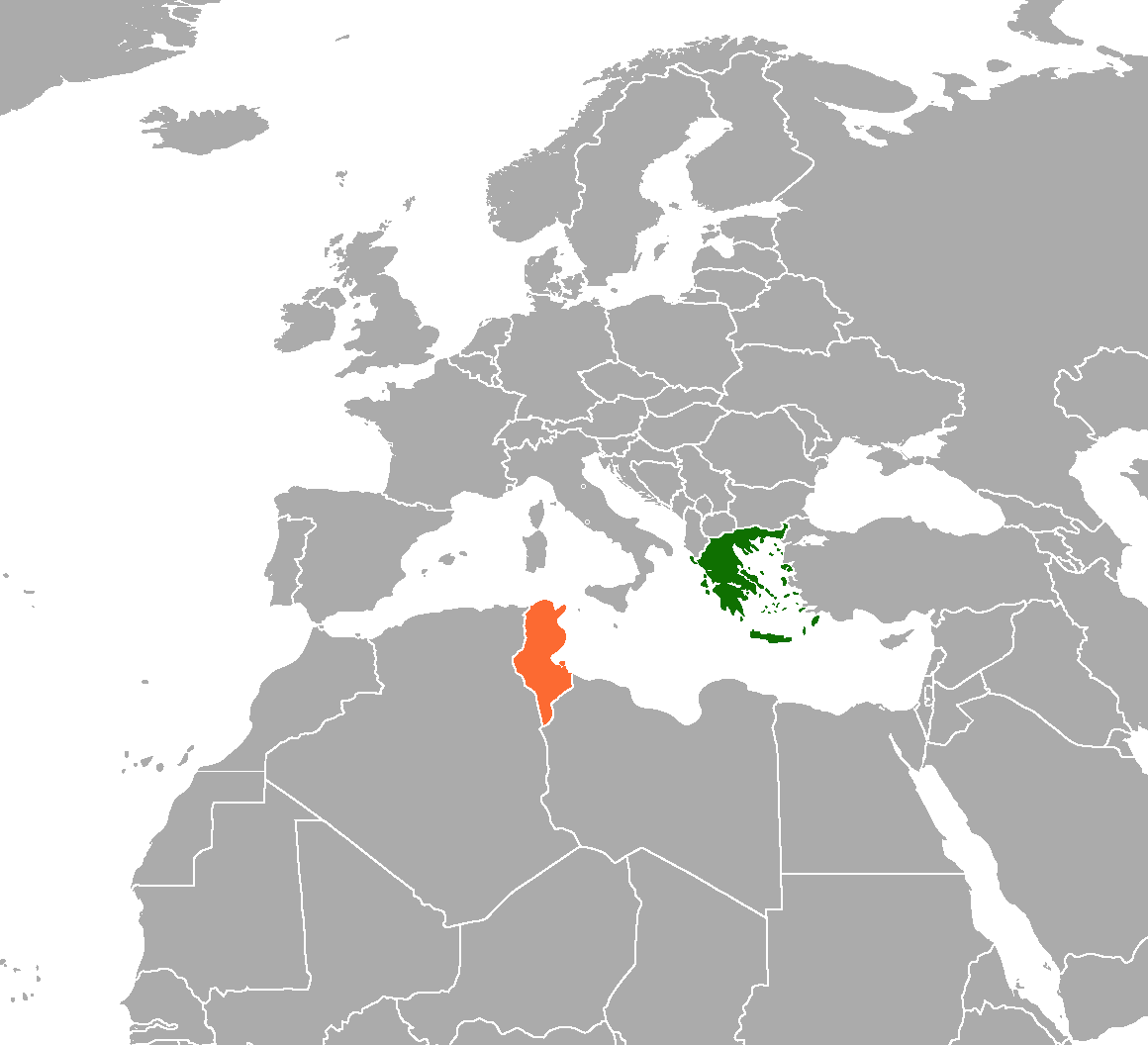
- Greece: Tunisia

Greece–Tunisia relations are foreign relations between Greece and Tunisia. Both countries established diplomatic relations in 1956 when Tunisia received its independence. Greece has an embassy in Tunis, and Tunisia has an embassy in Athens. Both countries are members of the Union for the Mediterranean and the Francophonie. The two countries share a deep and long ancient history with the contacts between Ancient Carthage towards Ancient Greece and vice versa.

During the COVID-19 pandemic, Greece donated 100,000 vaccines to Tunisia.

== Resident diplomatic missions ==
- Greece has an embassy in Tunis.
- Tunisia has an embassy in Athens.

== See also ==
- Foreign relations of Greece
- Foreign relations of Tunisia
