= List of diplomatic missions in Tunisia =

This is a list of diplomatic missions in Tunisia. There are currently 65 embassies in Tunis, and many countries maintain consulates in other Tunisian cities (not including honorary consulates).

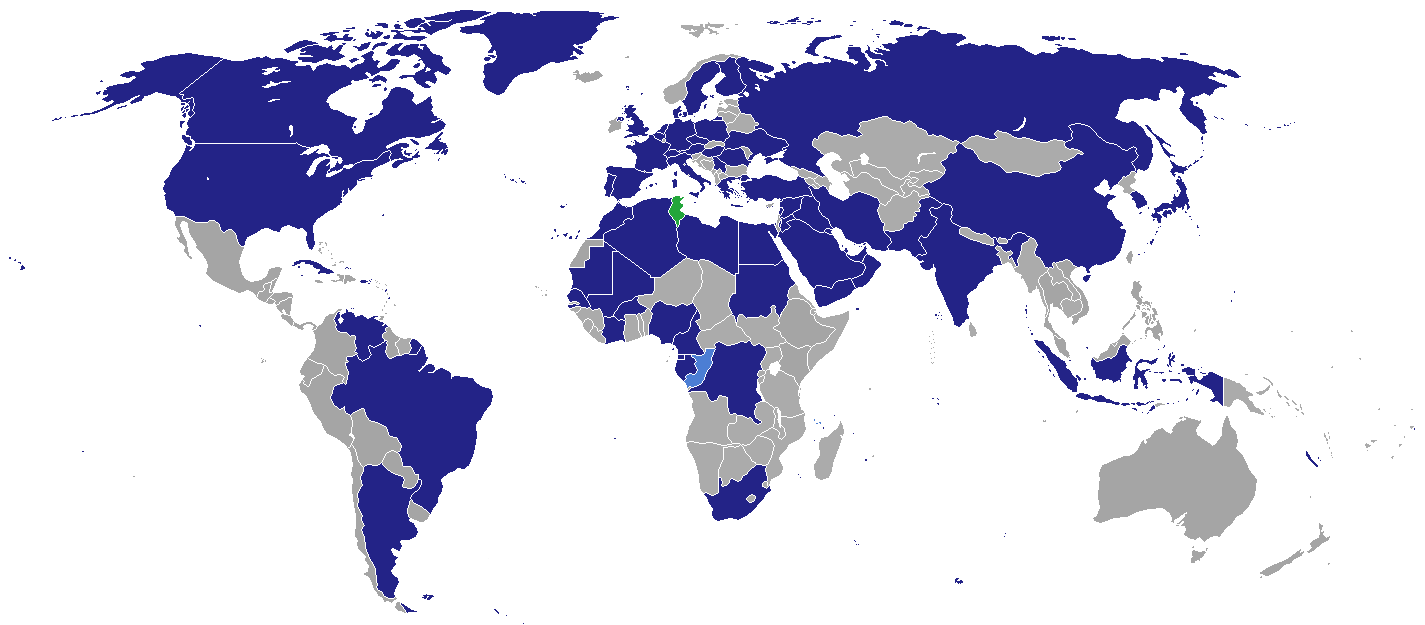
Map of diplomatic missions in Tunisia

== Diplomatic missions in Tunis ==
=== Embassies ===
1. Algeria
2. Argentina
3. Austria
4. Bahrain
5. Belgium
6. Brazil
7. Bulgaria
8. Burkina Faso
9. Cameroon
10. Canada
11. China
12. Cuba
13. Czech Republic
14. Congo-Kinshasa
15. Denmark
16. Egypt
17. Equatorial Guinea
18. Finland
19. France
20. Gabon
21. Germany
22. Greece
23. Hungary
24. India
25. Indonesia
26. Iran
27. Iraq
28. Italy
29. Ivory Coast
30. Japan
31. Jordan
32. Kuwait
33. Lebanon
34. Libya
35. Mali
36. Malta
37. Mauritania
38. Morocco
39. Netherlands
40. Nigeria
41. Oman
42. Pakistan
43. Palestine
44. Poland
45. Portugal
46. Qatar
47. Romania
48. Russia
49. Saudi Arabia
50. Senegal
51. Serbia
52. South Africa
53. South Korea
54. Spain
55. Sudan
56. Sweden
57. Switzerland
58. Syria
59. Turkey
60. Ukraine
61. United Arab Emirates
62. United Kingdom
63. United States
64. Venezuela
65. Yemen

=== Other diplomatic offices in Tunis ===
1. Abkhazia (Representative Office)
2. Catalonia (Delegation)
3. European Union (Delegation)

=== Gallery ===
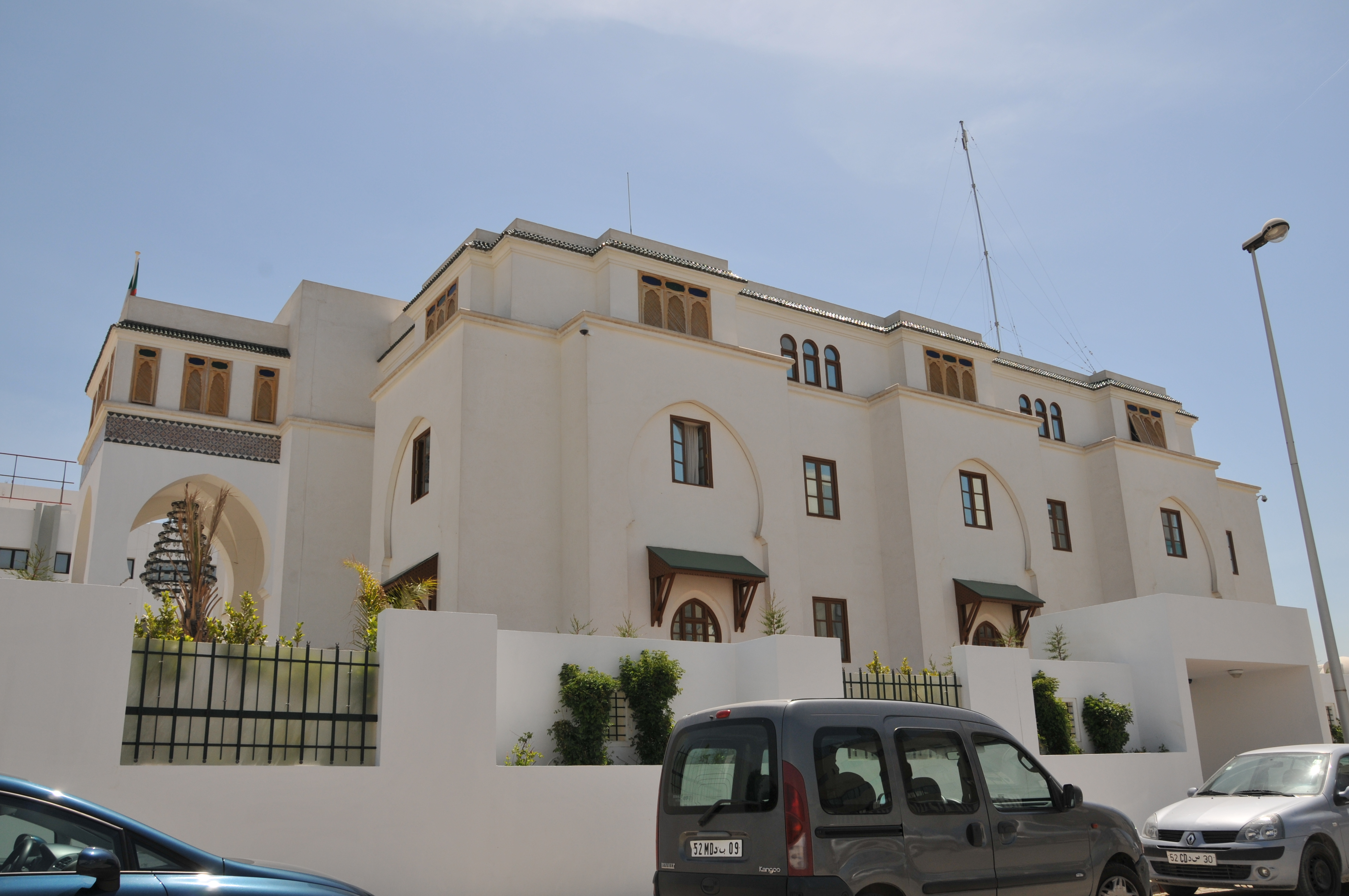
Embassy of Algeria

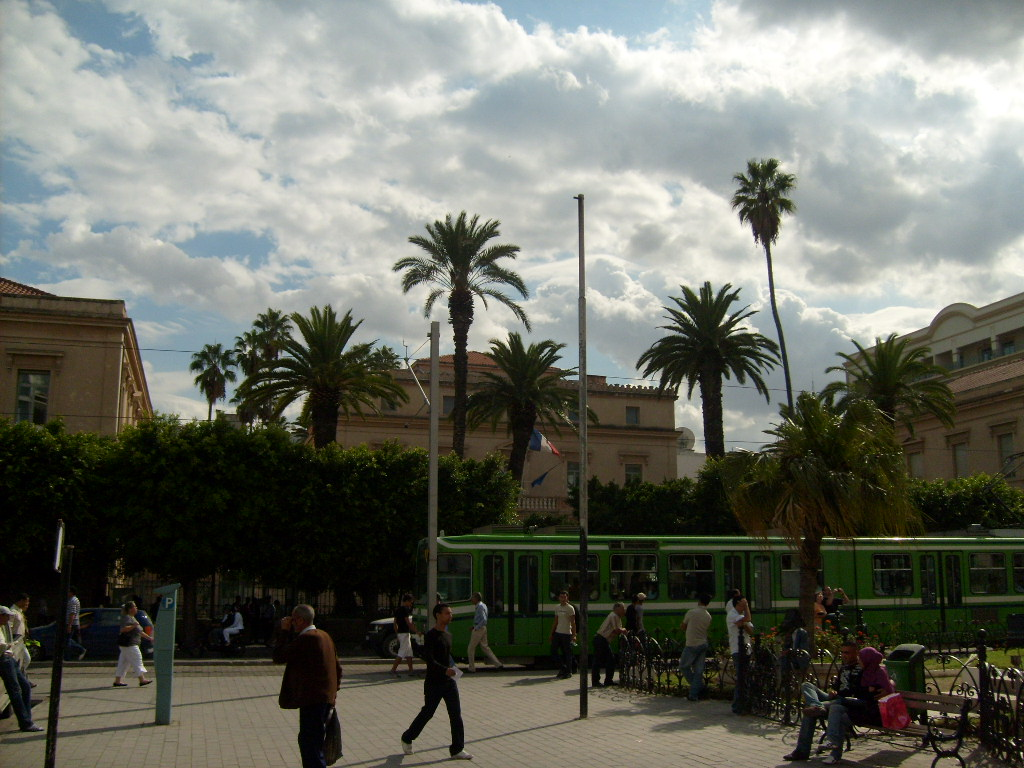
Embassy of France

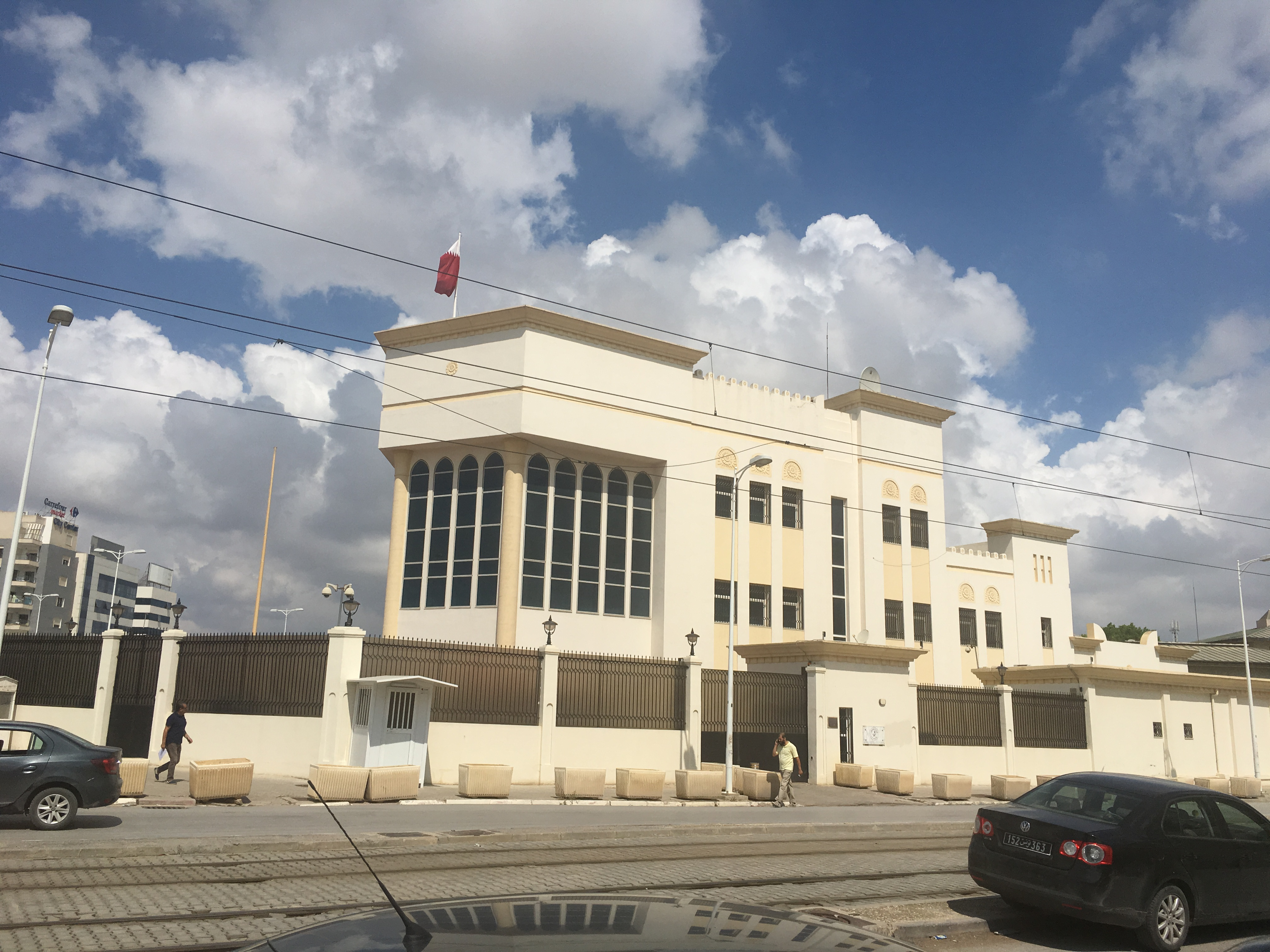
Embassy of Qatar

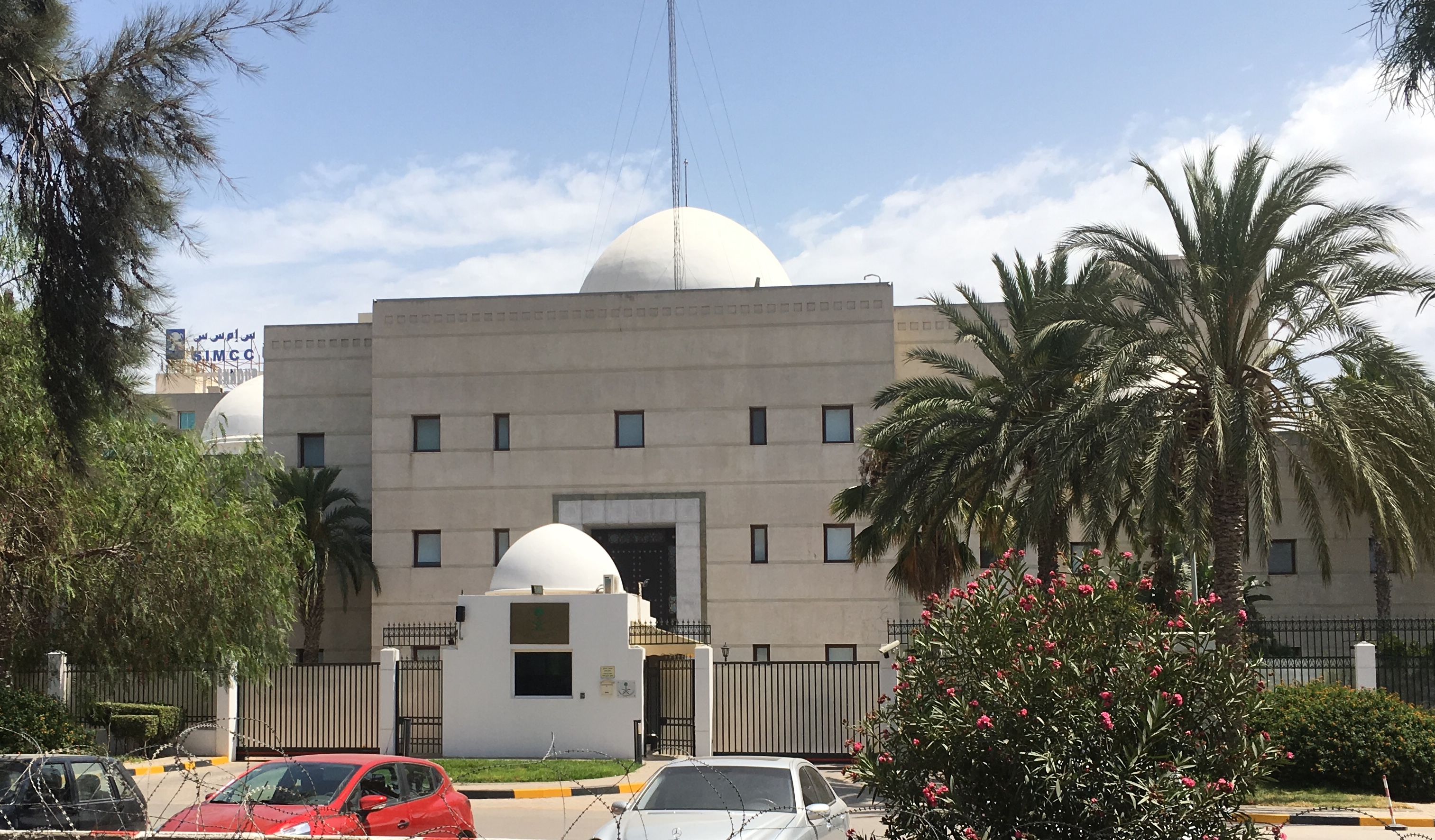
Embassy of Saudi Arabia

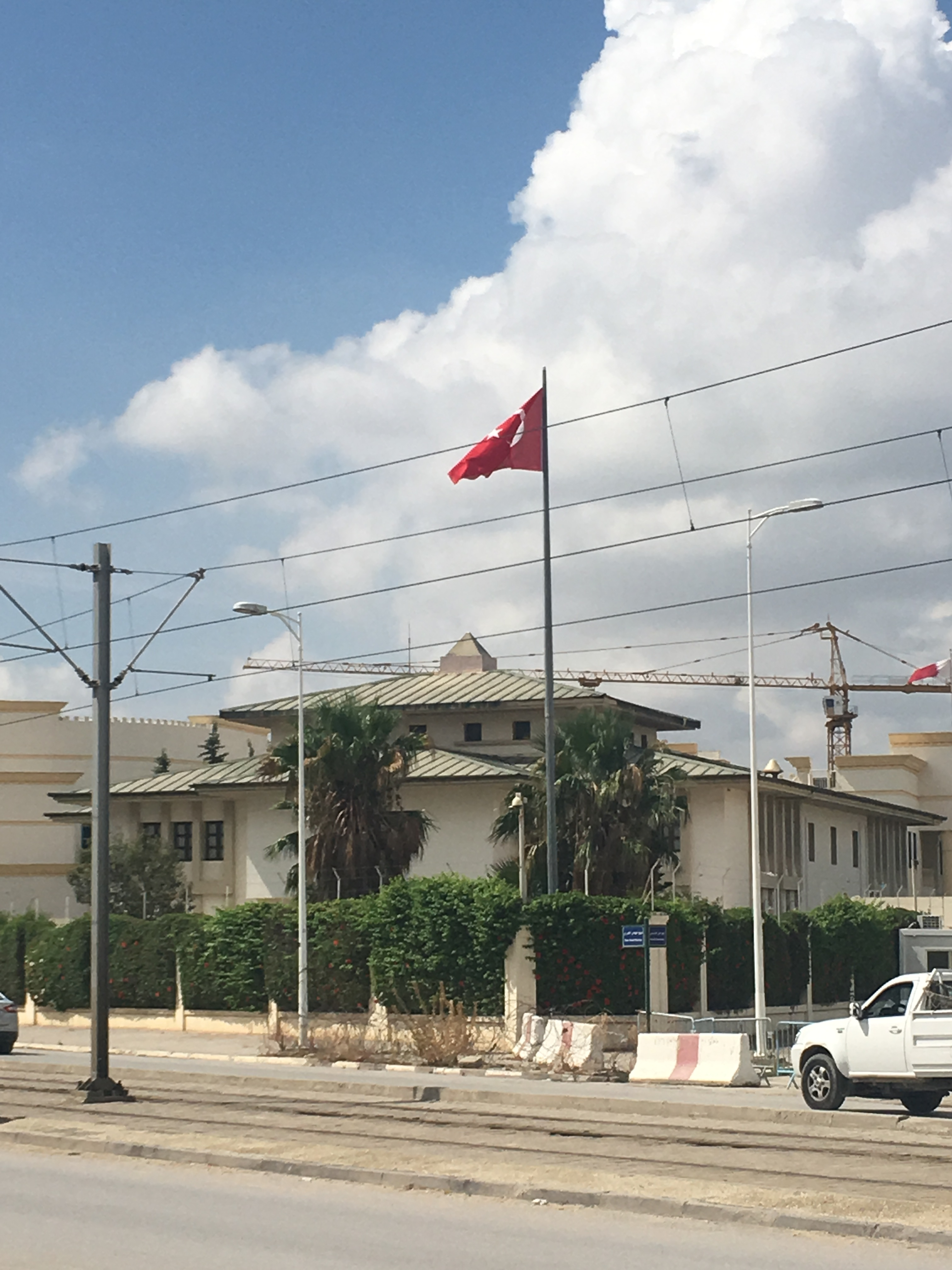
Embassy of Turkey

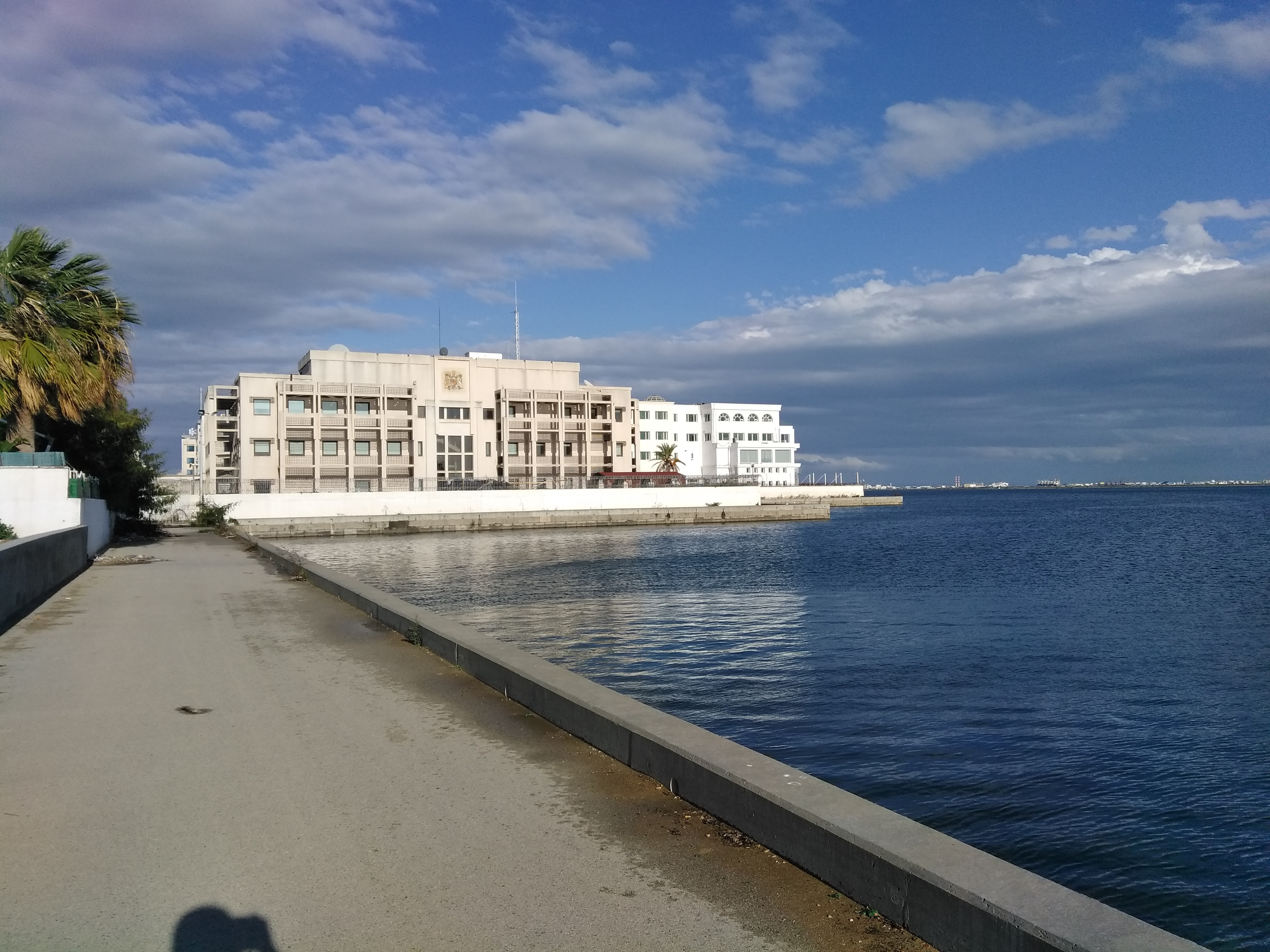
Embassy of the United Kingdom

== Consular Missions ==
=== Tunis ===
- Comoros (Consulate-General)
- Congo-Brazzaville (Consulate-General)

=== El Kef ===
- Algeria (Consulate-General)

=== Gafsa ===
- Algeria (Consulate-General)

=== Sfax ===
- Libya (Consulate-General)

== Non-resident embassies accredited to Tunisia ==
=== Resident in Algiers, Algeria ===
- Angola
- Azerbaijan
- Chad
- Chile
- Colombia
- Congo-Brazzaville
- Ghana
- Guinea
- Guinea-Bissau
- Holy See
- Kazakhstan
- Madagascar
- Malaysia
- Mexico
- Namibia
- Niger
- Norway
- Peru
- Slovakia
- Zimbabwe

=== Resident in Cairo, Egypt ===
- Armenia
- Brunei
- Cambodia
- Georgia
- Kenya
- Malawi
- Mauritius
- Mozambique
- Nepal
- New Zealand
- Sierra Leone
- South Sudan
- Sri Lanka
- Uruguay
- Vietnam
- Zambia

=== Resident in Paris, France ===
- Bolivia
- Costa Rica
- Djibouti
- Estonia
- Ecuador
- Iceland
- Lithuania
- Panama
- Tanzania
- Tajikistan
- Uzbekistan
- Vanuatu

=== Resident in Rabat, Morocco ===
- Albania
- Burundi
- Central African Republic
- Croatia
- Ethiopia
- Gambia
- Ireland
- Rwanda
- Thailand
- Togo

=== Resident in Tripoli, Libya ===
- Bangladesh
- Bosnia and Herzegovina
- Lesotho
- Philippines

=== Resident elsewhere ===
- Australia (Valletta)
- Afghanistan (Rome/Paris/Cairo)
- Cyprus (Lisbon)
- El Salvador(Rome)
- Haiti (Paris/Rabat)
- Kyrgyzstan (Ankara)
- Latvia (Riga)
- Maldives (Geneva)
- Moldova (Madrid)
- Nicaragua (Kuwait City)
- Seychelles (Addis Ababa)
- Singapore (Singapore)
- Slovenia (Rome)
- Turkmenistan (Ankara)

== See also ==
- Foreign relations of Tunisia
