= Mexico–Tunisia relations =

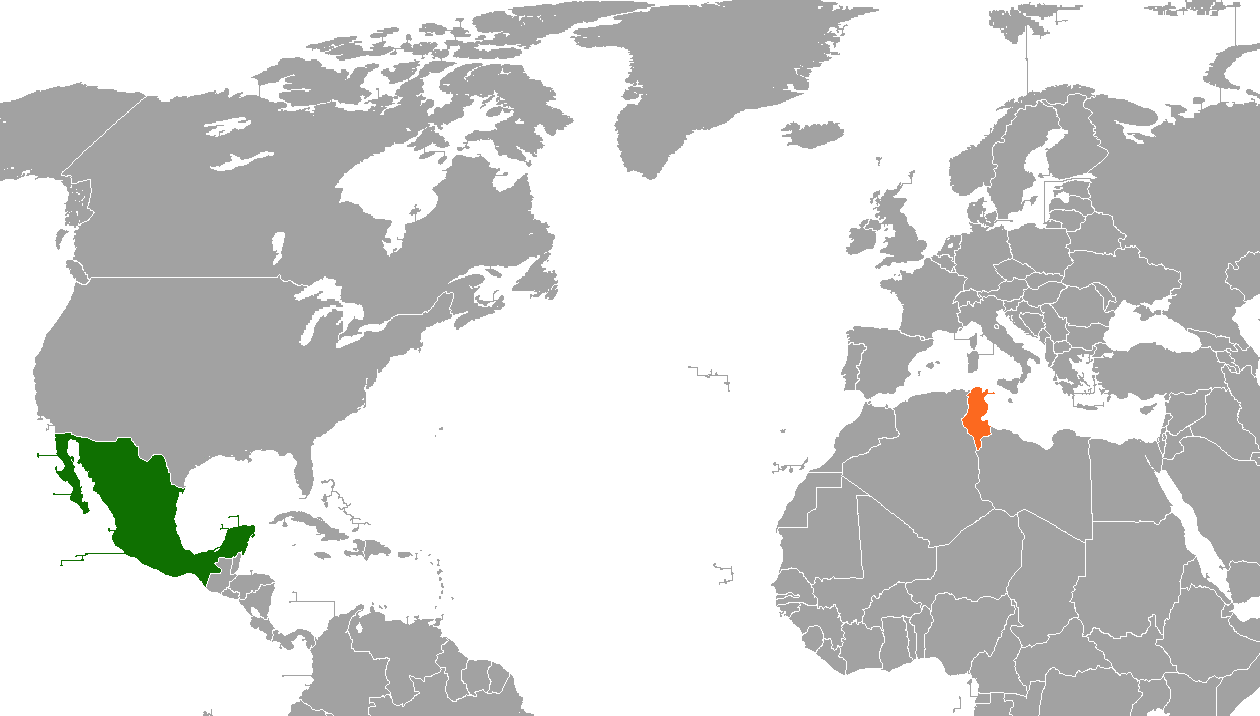

- Mexico: Tunisia

The nations of Mexico and Tunisia established diplomatic relations in 1961. Both nations are members of the United Nations.

== History ==
In 1881, the Mexican government first heard of Tunisia when it received information sent by its diplomatic legation's in France and Italy about the French protectorate of Tunisia. In 1956, Tunisia obtained its independence from France.

In 1961, Mexican President Adolfo López Mateos sent a presidential delegation of goodwill, led by Special Envoy Alejandro Carrillo Marcor and Delegate José Ezequiel Iturriaga; to visit Tunisia to pave the way for establishing diplomatic relations between the two nations. That same year, on 17 November 1961, Mexico and Tunisia established diplomatic relations with Mexico accrediting its embassy in Paris for Tunisia. Since the establishment of diplomatic relations; diplomatic relations between both nations have been limited and have taken place primarily in multinational organizations such as at the United Nations.

In 1994, Mexican Foreign Undersecretary Juan Rebolledo Gout paid a visit to Tunisia. In March 2002, Tunisian Prime Minister Mohamed Ghannouchi paid a visit to Mexico to attend the Monterrey Consensus and met with Mexican President Vicente Fox. In February 2005, Mexican Director General for Africa and Middle East, Hector Valezzi, paid a visit to Tunisia. In 2012, Mexican Director General for Africa and Middle East, Sara Valdés, paid a visit to Tunis to meet with the head of the African Development Bank (which was based in Tunisia at the time). In November 2014, the Mexican Director General for ProMéxico, Francisco González Díaz, arrived to Tunisia leading a delegation of Mexican business people specializing in the food, building materials and biotechnology industries and consulting services.

In March 2015, Mexico condemned the attack on the Bardo National Museum in Tunis where eight Mexican citizens happened to be at the time. The eight Mexican nationals were released from the museum and none of them were harmed during the attack.

In November 2021, both nations celebrated 60 years of diplomatic relations.

== High-level visits ==
High-level visits from Mexico to Tunisia

- Special Envoy Alejandro Carrillo Marcor (1961)
- Delegate José Ezequiel Iturriaga (1961)
- Foreign Undersecretary Juan Rebolledo Gout (1994)
- Director General for Africa and Middle East Hector Valezzi (2005)
- Director General for Africa and Middle East Sara Valdés (2012)
- Director General for ProMéxico Francisco González Díaz (2014)

High-level visits from Tunisia to Mexico

- Prime Minister Mohamed Ghannouchi (2002)
- Minister of Health Saïd Aïdi (2015)

== Bilateral relations ==
Both nations have signed several bilateral agreements such as an Agreement for Educational and Cultural Cooperation (1998); Agreement for Cooperation between Bancomext and the Tunisian Center of Export and Promotion (1998); Visa Suppression Agreement (1999); Memorandum of Understanding between ProMéxico and the Agency for the Promotion of Foreign Investment of Tunisia (2016) and a Memorandum of Understanding between the National Auto Parts Industry of Mexico (INA) and the Tunisian Automotive Association (2017).

== Trade ==
In 2023, trade between both nations totaled US$130 million. Mexico's main exports to Tunisia include: telephones and mobile phones, machinery, sewing machines, chemical based products, rubber and plastic, motor cars and other vehicles, ferroalloys, pepper and vegetables. Tunisia's main exports to Mexico include: electrical equipment, telephones and mobile phones, hydraulic cement, olive oil, clothing, instruments and apparatuses, chemical based products, parts and accessories for motor vehicles, and fruits. Mexican multinational company Grupo Bimbo operates in Tunisia.

== Diplomatic missions ==
- Mexico is accredited to Tunisia from its embassy in Algiers, Algeria and maintains an honorary consulate in Tunis.
- Tunisia is accredited to Mexico from its embassy in Washington, D.C., United States.

== See also ==
- Foreign relations of Mexico
- Foreign relations of Tunisia
