= Israel–Tunisia relations =

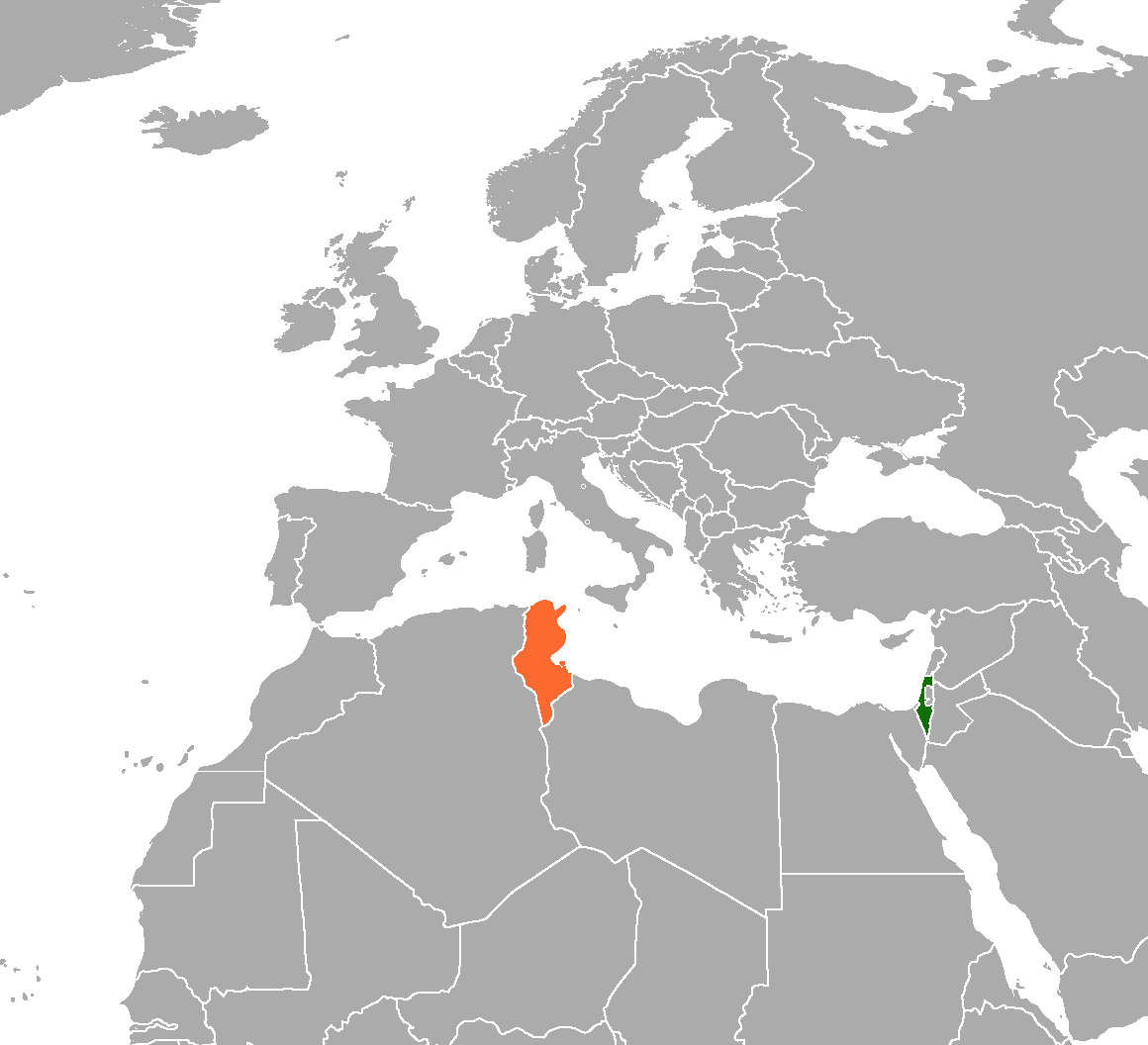
- Israel: Tunisia

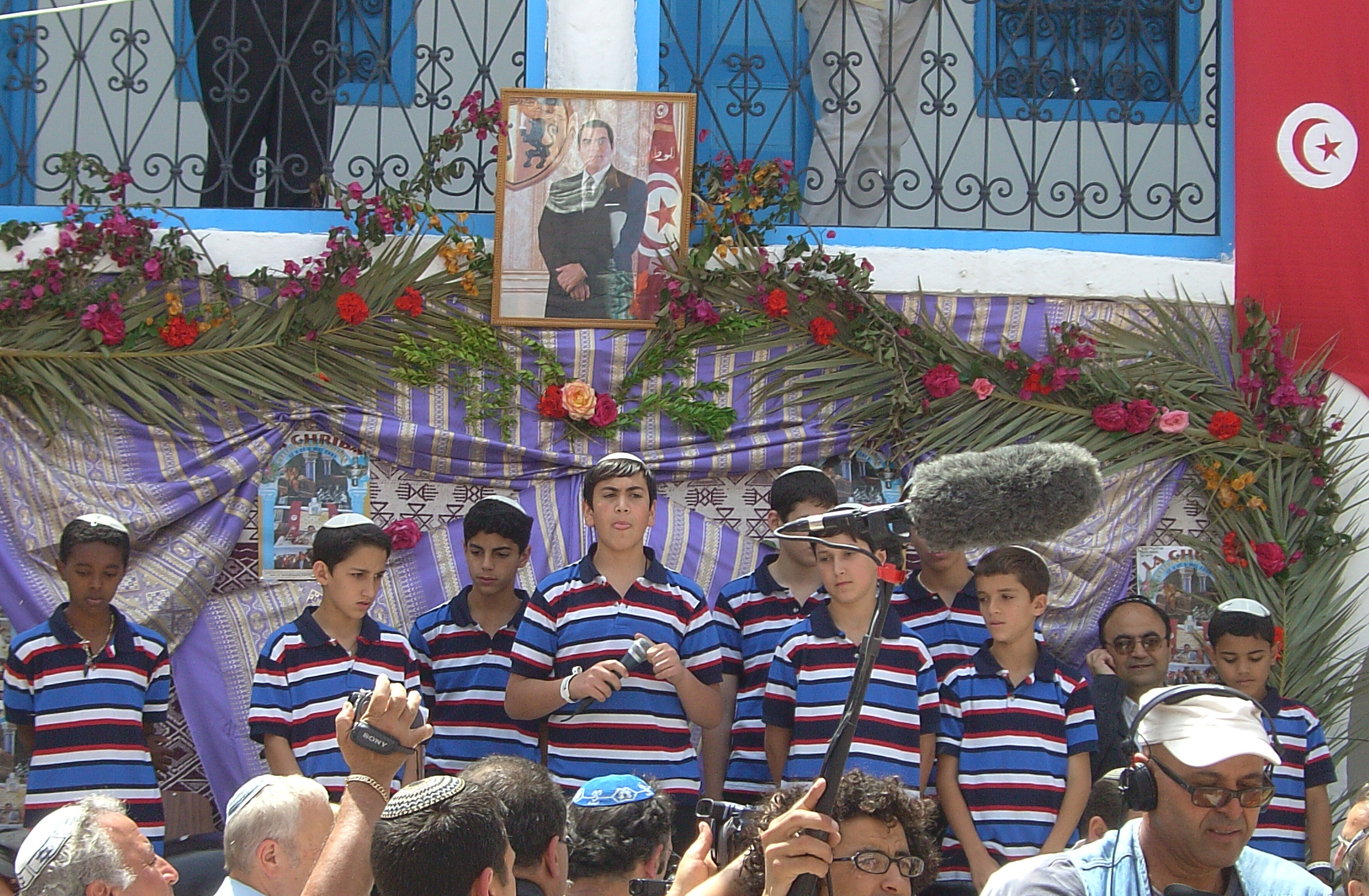
Jerusalem Boys Choir visiting Djerba, 2007

Israel–Tunisia relations refers to bilateral relations between Israel and Tunisia. There are no official diplomatic relations between the two states. Tunisia is a state with a long history of a Jewish community.

== History ==
The earliest contacts between Israel and Tunisia took place at the United Nations in New York in 1951–1952, when Tunisian representatives approached the Israeli delegation and Israeli labor leaders. In June 1952, Bahi Ladgham, a close confidant of Habib Bourguiba, met with Gideon Rafael seeking support for Tunisian independence. Bourguiba stated that he would not seek Israel's elimination and would work to promote peace in the region. In 1956, after Tunisia declared independence, he met secretly with Ya'akov Tzur, Israel's ambassador to France. Later that year, Tsur met with the Tunisian finance minister, who sought Israel's assistance in building cooperative agricultural settlements.

Operation Wooden Leg was an attack on October 1, 1985 by Israel on the Palestine Liberation Organization (PLO) headquarters in Hammam al-Shatt in response to the murder of 3 Israeli citizens in Cyprus. The operation resulted in at least 30 deaths.

In 1987, Zine El Abidine Ben Ali ousted Habib Bourguiba in a bloodless coup. While Ben Ali publicly took a strong anti-Israel stance, his administration maintained clandestine contacts with Israel. As a byproduct of the Madrid Conference of 1991, Tunisia and Israel established low-level diplomatic relations culminating in opening an "Interest Section" in each other’s countries in 1996.

Tunisia claims it played a major role in secret talks between the PLO and Israel which led to the Oslo I Accord, signed in September 1993. Salah Masawi, director general of the Tunisian Ministry of Foreign Affairs, stated that he saw no obstacle to establishing diplomatic relations with Israel. In 1993, Yossi Beilin, then Israel's Deputy Minister for Foreign Affairs, visited Tunisia. Direct telephone links were established in July 1993. After the Tunisia offices of the PLO were closed in June 1994, the first Israeli tourists arrived.

In 1994, channels of communication were opened with Israel through the Belgian embassies in Tel Aviv and Tunis. Tunisian Foreign Minister Habib Ben Yahia and then-Israeli Foreign Minister Ehud Barak met in Barcelona in 1995 to expand official relations between the two countries.

In 2000, after the Second Intifada, relations worsened and President Zine El Abidine Ben Ali broke off relations with Israel.

In June 2021, both Israel and Tunisia were among 30 countries which participated in the Sea Breeze 2021, multinational naval maneuvers in the Black Sea.

In October 2023, following October 7 attacks that led to the start of Gaza war, the Tunisian parliament proposed a bill criminalizing ties with Israel. However, on November 2, President Kais Saied interrupted a voting session on the bill to instruct members to dismiss the bill. Mohamed Ali, an MP and the rapporteur for the Rights and Freedoms Committee (responsible for examining the bill before it went to the plenary session) has claimed that Washington had threatened "economic and military sanctions" if the bill were passed.

Amid the war on Gaza started in 2023, many Tunisians stand unified in support of anti-normalisation laws as resentment of Israel and the West.

== Sporting events ==
In 2013, Malek Jaziri withdrew from a Challenger tournament in Tashkent after being scheduled to play against Israeli Amir Weintraub. As a result, the International Tennis Federation suspended Tunisia from Davis Cup play. In 2016, the match between Jaziri and Israeli Dudi Sela led to boycotts, although it did occur.

In 2020, Tunisian President Kais Saied called for an investigation following the participation of Israeli tennis player Aaron Cohen in the ITF Junior Circuit in Tunisia, where he also played against Tunisian player Karim Chedly.

At the 2020 Fed Cup, the Israeli and Tunisian national women's tennis teams met in Helsinki. The decision was criticized by the Tunisian Foreign Ministry, which accused the Tunisian team of violating "the historic commitments of Tunisia towards the Palestinian cause".

Tunisian Aziz Dougaz competed against Israeli Dudi Sela at the 2020 Morelos Open – Singles.

== See also ==
- Foreign relations of Israel
- Foreign relations of Tunisia
- History of the Jews in Tunisia
- Judeo-Tunisian Arabic
- Ghriba synagogue bombing
