= Foreign relations of Tunisia =

Former President Zine El Abidine Ben Ali has maintained Tunisia's long-time policy of seeking good relations with the West, while playing an active role in Arab and African regional bodies. President Habib Bourguiba took a nonaligned stance but emphasized close relations with Europe, Pakistan, and the United States.

== Diplomatic relations ==
List of countries which Tunisia maintains diplomatic relations with:

#	Country	Date
1	France	20 March 1956
2	Egypt	2 May 1956
3	Syria	2 June 1956
4	United States	6 June 1956
5	United Kingdom	19 June 1956
6	Italy	20 June 1956
7	Libya	22 June 1956
8	Japan	26 June 1956
9	Saudi Arabia	June 1956
10	Russia	11 July 1956
11	Morocco	18 July 1956
12	Bulgaria	30 August 1956
13	Hungary	31 August 1956
14	Switzerland	30 October 1956
15	Germany	7 December 1956
16	Greece	1956
17	Jordan	1956
18	Serbia	13 February 1957
19	Belgium	21 May 1957
20	Portugal	21 May 1957
21	Spain	8 July 1957
22	Turkey	22 July 1957
23	Canada	9 September 1957
24	Lebanon	October 1957
25	Iran	5 November 1957
26	Liberia	1957
27	Malaysia	1957
28	Netherlands	February 1958
29	Pakistan	25 March 1958
30	India	2 April 1958
31	Ghana	11 June 1958
32	Norway	29 August 1958
33	Sweden	14 October 1958
34	Austria	2 May 1959
35	Finland	17 July 1959
36	Czech Republic	29 July 1959
37	Denmark	1 September 1959
38	Cuba	23 September 1959
39	Brazil	7 October 1959
40	Poland	15 November 1959
41	Sudan	29 November 1959
42	Iraq	1959
43	Indonesia	12 November 1960
44	Cameroon	18 February 1961
45	Ivory Coast	22 March 1961
46	Mauritania	29 April 1961
47	Chile	6 October 1961
48	Argentina	11 October 1961
49	Mexico	16 November 1961
50	Republic of the Congo	1961
51	Kuwait	24 June 1962
52	Guinea	30 June 1962
53	Ethiopia	31 July 1962
54	Algeria	13 November 1962
55	Democratic Republic of the Congo	1962
56	Senegal	1962
57	Romania	16 December 1963
58	Mali	1963
59	China	10 January 1964
60	Luxembourg	28 April 1964
61	Burkina Faso	1964
62	Venezuela	26 March 1965
63	Uruguay	16 September 1965
64	Togo	1965
65	Benin	22 December 1966
66	Thailand	2 February 1967
67	Peru	30 May 1967
68	Malta	21 December 1967
69	Chad	25 January 1968
70	Niger	24 April 1968
71	Kenya	26 November 1968
72	Tanzania	2 December 1968
73	Uganda	9 December 1968
74	Madagascar	12 March 1969
75	South Korea	31 March 1969
76	Somalia	July 1969
77	Nigeria	15 January 1970
78	Iceland	14 May 1970
79	Central African Republic	19 January 1971
80	Gabon	10 July 1971
81	Oman	December 1971
82	Rwanda	1971
—	Holy See	22 March 1972
83	United Arab Emirates	14 June 1972
84	Qatar	20 June 1972
85	Bahrain	25 June 1972
86	Vietnam	15 December 1972
87	Gambia	28 December 1972
88	Equatorial Guinea	1972
89	Zambia	1972
90	Bangladesh	17 July 1973
91	Albania	8 October 1973
92	Costa Rica	15 October 1973
93	Ireland	16 January 1975
94	North Korea	3 August 1975
95	Philippines	15 December 1975
96	Mozambique	1975
97	Mauritius	9 February 1976
98	Comoros	1976
99	Mongolia	15 February 1977
100	Australia	17 February 1977
101	Djibouti	1977
102	Ecuador	29 January 1980
103	Angola	28 February 1980
104	Burundi	1 March 1980
105	Guinea-Bissau	1980
106	Colombia	20 January 1981
107	Zimbabwe	January 1981
108	Sri Lanka	7 December 1981
109	Cape Verde	1981
110	Maldives	10 September 1983
111	Nepal	14 April 1984
112	Singapore	30 November 1984
113	Seychelles	25 August 1986
114	São Tomé and Príncipe	1986
115	Vanuatu	1 November 1988
116	Laos	30 November 1989
117	Namibia	23 March 1990
118	Brunei	1 May 1990
119	Ukraine	24 June 1992
120	Latvia	26 June 1992
121	Estonia	29 June 1992
122	Lithuania	30 June 1992
123	Bosnia and Herzegovina	30 October 1992
124	Botswana	11 November 1992
125	Kazakhstan	23 November 1992
126	Kyrgyzstan	25 November 1992
127	Uzbekistan	26 November 1992
128	Turkmenistan	30 November 1992
129	Slovakia	1 January 1993
130	Croatia	18 January 1993
131	Slovenia	20 May 1993
132	Eritrea	25 October 1993
133	South Africa	2 May 1994
134	Cambodia	12 April 1995
—	State of Palestine	19 April 1995
135	Georgia	7 March 1996
136	Belarus	29 January 1997
137	Azerbaijan	1 July 1998
138	Lesotho	1 December 2000
139	Armenia	15 July 2002
140	Moldova	27 September 2004
141	San Marino	17 December 2005
142	Tajikistan	19 June 2006
143	Andorra	20 November 2006
144	Montenegro	7 March 2007
145	El Salvador	14 March 2007
146	Guatemala	19 March 2007
147	Panama	15 June 2007
148	Saint Vincent and the Grenadines	2 July 2007
149	New Zealand	11 July 2012
150	Bolivia	24 July 2012
151	South Sudan	26 June 2015
152	Malawi	3 May 2017
153	Liechtenstein	20 October 2017
154	Monaco	19 September 2018
155	Dominican Republic	27 September 2018
156	Paraguay	1 November 2018
157	Nicaragua	2 July 2019
158	North Macedonia	27 September 2019
159	Jamaica	26 September 2024
160	Trinidad and Tobago	27 September 2025
161	Afghanistan	Unknown
162	Cyprus	Unknown
163	Eswatini	Unknown
164	Sierra Leone	Unknown
165	Yemen	Unknown

== Bilateral relations ==
=== Africa ===
Country	Formal Relations Began	Notes
Algeria		See Algeria–Tunisia relations Tunisia and Algeria resolved a longstanding border dispute in 1993 and have cooperated in the construction of the Trans-Mediterranean natural gas pipeline through Tunisia that connects Algeria to Italy. In 2003 Tunisia and Algeria formed Numhyd, a petroleum company to develop oil resources. It is jointly owned (each 50%) by government corporations, Algeria's Sonatrach and Tunisia's Entreprise Tunisienne d'Activités Pétrolières (ETAP). Recently Tunisia signed an agreement with Algeria in order to demarcate more exactly the maritime frontier between the two countries.: Algeria has an embassy in Tunis and consulates-general in El Kef and Gafsa.; Tunisia has an embassy in Algiers, a consulate-general in Annaba and a consulate in Tébessa.
Comoros		Both countries have established diplomatic relations.
Egypt	1956	See Egypt–Tunisia relations In the 1950s the President of Tunisia, Habib Bourguiba, criticized on pragmatic grounds the type of Arab nationalism then promoted by Gamal Abdel Nasser of Egypt, which was a widely popular ideology at the time in the Arabic-speaking countries. Their disagreement also concerned the policies of the Arab League. Bourguiba and Nassar eventually came to find some common ground. Although ties were broken under Nasser, and again under Anwar Sadat, on the whole relations between Egypt and Tunisia have remained mutually beneficial. After the Tunisian revolution in 2011, Tunisian-Egyptian relations were very good, especially after the 2011 elections in Tunisia, where the Islamic-oriented Ennahda Movement won the elections, as well as the Muslim Brotherhood movement in Egypt won the elections, and also the convergence between the two presidents Moncef Marzouki and Mohamed Morsi. But since the 2013 Egyptian coup d'état, relations became increasingly strained, and between the two and considered Tunisia that what is happening in Egypt is a military coup d'État bloody and protested against it in the United Nations, which led to a diplomatic crisis in relations severed in an indirect way and there is a lack of official visits at all levels. After the 2014 elections in Tunisia and the win of Nidaa Tounes's secular movement, improved relations and exchanged visits between officials and ministers.: Egypt has an embassy in Tunis.; Tunisia has an embassy in Cairo.
Libya	22 June 1956	See Libya–Tunisia relations Tunisia's relations with Libya have been erratic since Tunisia annulled a brief agreement to form a union in 1974. Diplomatic relations were broken in 1976, restored in 1977, and deteriorated again in 1980, when Libyan-trained rebels attempted to seize the town of Gafsa. In 1982, the International Court of Justice ruled in Libya's favor in the partition of the oil-rich continental shelf it shares with Tunisia. Libya's 1985 expulsion of Tunisian workers and military threats led Tunisia to sever relations. Relations were normalized again in 1987. While supporting the United Nations sanctions imposed following airline bombings, Tunisia has been careful to maintain positive relations with its neighbor. Tunisia supported the lifting of UN sanctions against Libya in 2003, and Libya is again becoming a major trading partner. Currently, Tunisia has a maritime dispute with Libya. Tunisia, Algeria and Egypt, in coordination with the United Nations Support Mission in Libya, called in November 2025, for national unity in Libya.: Libya has an embassy in Tunis and a consulate-general in Sfax.; Tunisia has an embassy in Tripoli and a consulate-general in Benghazi.
Morocco	1956	See Morocco–Tunisia relations Trade is increasing between Tunisia and Morocco. Direct maritime shipping commenced between the two countries in 2008 to supplement rail connections that remained uncertain. Also, the stock exchanges of Tunis and Casablanca this year began to jointly list the stock of a Maghriban company, this initial case involving an IPO.: Morocco has an embassy in Tunis.; Tunisia has an embassy in Rabat.

=== Americas ===
Country	Formal Relations Began	Notes
Argentina	11 October 1961	Both countries established diplomatic relations on 11 October 1961.: Argentina has an embassy in Tunis.; Tunisia has an embassy in Buenos Aires.
Belize		Both countries have passed a number of bilateral agreements.
Brazil	1956	Brazil has an embassy in Tunis.; Tunisia has an embassy in Brasília.
Canada	9 September 1957	Both countries established diplomatic relations on 9 September 1957.: Canada has an embassy in Tunis.; Tunisia has an embassy in Ottawa and a consulate in Montreal.
Mexico	16 November 1961	See Mexico–Tunisia relations Both countries established diplomatic relations on 16 November 1961.: Mexico is accredited to Tunisia from its embassy in Algiers, Algeria and maintains an honorary consulate in Tunis.; Tunisia is accredited to Mexico from its embassy in Washington, D.C., United States.
United States	6 June 1956	See Tunisia–United States relations Both countries established diplomatic relations on 6 June 1956 The Embassy of Tunisia in Washington, D.C. The United States has very good relations with Tunisia, which date back more than 200 years. The United States has maintained official representation in Tunis almost continuously since 1795, and the American Friendship Treaty with Tunisia was signed in 1799. The two governments are not linked by security treaties, but relations have been close since Tunisia's independence. The United States and Tunisia have an active schedule of joint military exercises. U.S. security assistance historically has played an important role in cementing relations. The U.S.-Tunisian Joint Military Commission meets annually to discuss military cooperation, Tunisia's defense modernization program, and other security matters. Since 2015, Tunisia and the United States are partners under the Major non-NATO partnership agreement.: Tunisia has an embassy in Washington, D.C.; United States has an embassy in Tunis.

=== Asia ===
Tunisia has long been a voice for moderation and realism in the Middle East. Tunisia served as the headquarters of the Arab League from 1979 to 1990 and hosted the Palestine Liberation Organization's (PLO) headquarters from 1982 to 1993, when the PLO Executive Committee relocated to Jericho and the Palestinian Authority was established after the signing of the Oslo Accords. The PLO Political Department remains in Tunis.

Tunisia consistently has played a moderating role in the negotiations for a comprehensive Middle East peace. In 1993, Tunisia was the first Arab country to host an official Israeli delegation as part of the Middle East peace process and maintained an Interests Section until the outbreak in 2000 of the Intifada. Israeli citizens of Tunisian descent may travel to Tunisia on their Israeli passports.

Country	Formal Relations Began	Notes
Armenia		See Armenia–Tunisia relations: Armenia is accredited to Tunisia from its embassy in Cairo, Egypt.; Tunisia is accredited to Armenia from its embassy in Moscow, Russia.
Azerbaijan	1 July 1998	See Azerbaijan-Tunisia relations: Diplomatic relations between the Republic of Azerbaijan and the Republic of Tunisia were established on July 1, 1998.; Relations between Azerbaijan and Tunisia have been developed within the framework of international organizations, including the UN and OIC.; Azerbaijan is accredited to the Republic of Tunisia through its ambassador in the Kingdom of Morocco.
China	10 January 1964	See China–Tunisia relations Both countries established diplomatic relations on 10 January 1964: China has an embassy in Tunis.; Tunisia has an embassy in Beijing.
India		See India–Tunisia relations: India has an embassy in Tunis.; Tunisia has an embassy in New Delhi.
Iran		See Iran–Tunisia relations In May, 2005, Tunisia signed with Iran an agreement for cooperation in air, sea, and road transportation. It was signed on the visit of Tunisian minister Abderrahim Zouari to Iran.: Iran has an embassy in Tunis.; Tunisia has an embassy in Tehran.
Israel		See Israel–Tunisia relations: Israel had an interest office in Tunis between 1996 and 2000.; Tunisia had an interest office in Tel Aviv between 1996 and 2000.
Japan		Tunisia and Japan have a visa agreement, Tunisian people traveling to Japan and Japanese people traveling to Tunisia do not need a visa, as long as their stay do not exceed 3 months. Japan also supports Tunisia, with equipment and money donations. Both countries had friendly relations since Tunisia's independence in 1956. Since 2015, Tunisia and Japan are allies under the Major non-NATO ally agreement.: Japan has an embassy in Tunis.; Tunisia has an embassy in Tokyo.
Lebanon		Tunisia and Lebanon share historical and civilizational ties. In June, 2010, the Tunisian Prime Minister Mohamed Ghannouchi and his Lebanese counterpart Mr. Saad Hariri chaired a Tunisian-Lebanese working session. Both countries want to energize the process for the Euro-Mediterranean Partnership. In addition, Tunisia reaffirmed its support of Lebanon.: Lebanon has an embassy in Tunis.; Tunisia has an embassy in Beirut.
Pakistan	28 May 1958	See Pakistan–Tunisia relations Both countries established diplomatic relations on 28 May 1958.: Pakistan has an embassy in Tunis.; Tunisia has an embassy in Islamabad.
Qatar		See Qatar–Tunisia relations Qatar is among the largest Arab investors in Tunisia. Relations between Qatar and Tunisia improved immensely between 2011 and 2013, when Ennahda Movement-affiliated candidate Hamadi Jebali was declared Prime Minister of Tunisia in the 2011 Tunisian Constituent Assembly elections. Cooperation in all fields gradually started picking up traction; for instance, the two governments signed ten bilateral agreements in 2012.: Qatar has an embassy in Tunis.; Tunisia has an embassy in Doha.
Saudi Arabia		See Saudi Arabia–Tunisia relations In July 2010, a Tunisian-Saudi non-double taxation agreement was signed in Tunis, by Finance Minister Ridha Chalghoum and his Saudi counterpart Ibrahim Bin Abdulaziz Al-Assaf. The two ministers said this convention will certainly help boost trade exchanges between Tunisia and Saudi Arabia, stimulate investments, and favour exchange of expertise between the two countries. In particular, it will further the Tunisian-Saudi Investment and Development Bank "STUSID Bank" in developing financial co-operation and the contribution of the Saudi Fund for Development (SFD) to boost the development process in Tunisia. The minister highlighted the importance of drawing on the two countries' expertise in the tax and customs field and set up a joint action plan to strengthen co-operation.: Saudi Arabia has an embassy in Tunis.; Tunisia has an embassy in Riyadh and a consulate-general in Jeddah.
Syria	2 June 1956	The 11th session of the Tunisian-Syrian High Joint Committee met in Tunis in May 2010. The two countries share experience and information on such issues as housing, shipping, and tourism.: Syria has an embassy in Tunis.; Tunisia has an embassy in Damascus.; Tunisia ceased to recognise the government of Syria on 4 February 2012. During his tenure, Hamadi Jebali, the Prime Minister, called on fellow Arab states to follow its lead: "We have to expel the Syrian ambassadors from Arab countries."; In 2019, France24 speculated that new president Kais Saied could renew his country's diplomatic relations with Syria.; Following the 2023 Turkey–Syria earthquake, President Saied decided to strengthen diplomatic ties with Syria.
Turkey	1956	See Tunisia–Turkey relations: Tunisia has an embassy in Ankara and a Consulate General in Istanbul.; Turkey has an embassy in Tunis.; Trade volume between the two countries was US$1.09 billion in 2018 (Tunisian exports/imports: 182/904 million USD).; Yunus Emre Institute has a local headquarters in Tunis.

=== Europe ===
Country	Formal Relations Began	Notes
Austria		Austria has an embassy in Tunis.; Tunisia has an embassy in Vienna.
Bulgaria	1956	Bulgaria has an embassy in Tunis.; Tunisia is accredited to Bulgaria from its embassy in Belgrade, Serbia.; Both countries are full members of the Union for the Mediterranean.; Tunisian Ministry of Foreign Affairs about relations with Bulgaria (in French only)
Croatia	1993-01-30	Croatia is accredited to Tunisia from its embassy in Rabat, Morocco and maintains an honorary consulate in Tunis.; Tunisia is accredited to Croatia from its embassy in Vienna, Austria and maintains an honorary consulate in Zagreb.; Both countries are full members of the Union for the Mediterranean.
Cyprus	1999	Cyprus is accredited to Tunisia from its embassy in Paris, France; Tunisia is accredited to Cyprus through its embassy in Rome, Italy and maintains an honorary consulate in Larnaca.; Both countries are full members of the Union for the Mediterranean.; Tunisian Foreign Affairs Ministry about relations with Cyprus (in French only)
Denmark		Denmark is accredited to Tunisia from its embassy in Algiers, Algeria and maintains an honorary consulate in Tunis.; Tunisia is accredited to Denmark from its embassy in The Hague, Netherlands and maintains an honorary consulate in Copenhagen.; Both countries are full members of the Union for the Mediterranean.; Tunisian Ministry of Foreign Affairs about relations with Denmark (in French only)
Finland	17 July 1959	Diplomatic relations between them were established on 17 July 1959.; Finland has an embassy in Tunis.; Tunisia has an embassy in Helsinki.; Ministry for Foreign Affairs of Finland about relations with Tunisia
France		See France–Tunisia relations Tunisia and France retain a special relationship due to their history, geographic location, and economic relationship. In France there is a sizeable Tunisian diaspora, and the French language is widely used in Tunisia. Business and government connections are extensive and mutually maintained. Ranked by country, France receives the largest amount of Tunisian exports, and France is number-one regarding Tunisian imports also. In recent years many French companies have re-localized production to Tunisia.: France has an embassy in Tunis.; Tunisia has an embassy in Paris, consulates-general in Lyon and Marseille, and consulates in Grenoble, Nice, Pantin, Strasbourg and Toulouse.
Germany		Germany has an embassy in Tunis.; Tunisia has an embassy in Berlin.
Greece		See Greece–Tunisia relations: Greece has an embassy in Tunis.; Tunisia has an embassy in Athens.
Italy	20 June 1956	See Italy–Tunisia relations Both countries established diplomatic relations on 20 June 1956.: Italy has an embassy in Tunis.; Tunisia has an embassy in Rome, a consulate-general in Palermo and consulates in Genoa, Milan and Naples.
Malta	21 December 1967	See Malta–Tunisia relations: Both countries established diplomatic relations on 21 December 1967.; Malta has an embassy in Tunis.; Tunisia has an embassy in Valletta.; Both countries are full members of the Union for the Mediterranean.; Maltese and Tunisian Arabic are very similar languages. The two countries share very rich historical links.
Netherlands		the Netherlands has an embassy in Tunis.; Tunisia has an embassy in The Hague.
Poland		See Poland–Tunisia relations: Poland has an embassy in Tunis.; Tunisia has an embassy in Warsaw.
Portugal		Portugal has an embassy in Tunis.; Tunisia has an embassy in Lisbon.
Romania	1963	Romania has an embassy in Tunis.; Tunisia has an embassy in Bucharest and an honorary consulate in Timișoara.; Tunisian Ministry of Foreign Affairs about relations with Romania (in French only)
Russia	1956	See Russia–Tunisia relations Tunisian Prime Minister Sara Zaafarani with Russian President Vladimir Putin at the Third Russia–Africa Summit in Moscow, October 2026: Russia has an embassy in Tunis.; Tunisia has an embassy in Moscow.
Spain		See Spain–Tunisia relations: Spain has an embassy in Tunis.; Tunisia has an embassy in Madrid.
Sweden		See Sweden–Tunisia relations: Sweden has an embassy in Tunis.; Tunisia has an embassy in Stockholm.
Ukraine		Tunisia is accredited to Ukraine from its embassy in Warsaw, Poland.; Ukraine has an embassy in Tunis.
United Kingdom	1956	See Tunisia–United Kingdom relations British Foreign Secretary David Lammy with Tunisian Foreign Minister Mohamed Ali Nafti in Tunis, January 2025. Tunisia established diplomatic relations with the United Kingdom on 19 June 1956.: Tunisia maintains an embassy in London.; The United Kingdom is accredited to Tunisia through its embassy in Tunis.; Both countries share common membership of the World Trade Organization. Bilaterally the two countries have an Association Agreement, a Double Taxation Convention, and an Investment Agreement.

=== Oceania ===
Country	Formal Relations Began	Notes
Australia	17 February 1977	Both countries established diplomatic relations on 17 February 1977: Australia is accredited to Tunisia from its high commission in Valletta, Malta.; Tunisia is accredited to Australia from its embassy in Jakarta, Indonesia.
New Zealand	11 July 2012	Both countries established diplomatic relations on 11 July 2012

== Foreign Ambassadors ==
- Farid Abboud, Lebanese Ambassador to Tunisia (2007–2013)
- Jacob Walles, American Ambassador to Tunisia (2012–2016) Preceded by Daniel Rubinstein

== See also ==
- List of diplomatic missions in Tunisia
- List of diplomatic missions of Tunisia
