= Doug Ireland =

American journalist (1946–2013)

- Born: March 31, 1946; Duluth, Minnesota
- Died: October 26, 2013 (aged 67); East Village, New York City
- Occupations: Journalist, political activist
- Movement: Anti-war, LGBT, New Left

William Douglas Ireland (March 31, 1946 – October 26, 2013) was an American journalist and blogger who wrote about politics, power, media, and LGBT issues. He was the U.S. correspondent for the French political-investigative weekly Bakchich, for which he also wrote a weekly column, and he was also the Contributing Editor for International Affairs of Gay City News. Scott Tucker has called him "not only a left-wing critic of sexual and political conformism among sectors of the lesbian, gay, bisexual and transgender movements, but ... also one of the notable public intellectuals of the civil libertarian left."

== Professional ==
An early member of the Dump Johnson movement, Ireland was recruited for the staff of the presidential campaign of the man who became the anti-war candidate of the Dump Johnson movement, Senator Eugene McCarthy, for whom Ireland coordinated the Mid-Atlantic region of states. Following the 1968 Democratic National Convention (at which he coordinated McCarthy's labor support and helped organize demonstrations by Convention delegates against police brutality targeting anti-war demonstrators) Ireland went to Long Island to help run the successful campaign for Congress by Allard Lowenstein, considered the principal founder of the Dump Johnson movement.

After a stint as a journalist on the New York Post, when it was still owned by Dorothy Schiff, and then on the Community News Service (a short-lived wire service providing news of the black, Latino, and other minority racial communities), he resigned to manage the successful 1970 anti-Vietnam war campaign for Congress by Bella Abzug, making her the first left radical to be elected to the U.S. House of Representatives since Vito Marcantonio. He also managed Abzug's 1976 campaign for the Democratic nomination for U.S. Senator from New York, which Abzug narrowly lost by 0.10 per cent of the vote to Daniel Patrick Moynihan.

In 1973, he was put on the payroll of the new New York City Off-Track Betting Corp., along with several others who were expected to join OTB Chairman Howard J. Samuels' expected run for governor of New York the following year. Ireland did end up working on the Samuels campaign, which lost the Democratic primary to then-Rep. Hugh Carey.

Ireland played a studio executive in Woody Allen's Stardust Memories.

=== Journalism ===
Having already worked briefly at the New York Post and Community News Service, Ireland returned full-time to journalism in 1977, becoming a political columnist for the SoHo Weekly News. In an obituary, Micah Sifry wrote that "It was said that he could have been the 'next Jimmy Breslin,' but I think Dougie was too pure about his politics to ingratiate himself with enough people to win that label." Among his notable articles was a 1978 expose, daring for the time, of violence against gay men in the Ramble, known as a cruising area in Central Park in New York City.

He lived for ten years in France, writing on European politics and culture for various publications, including English language Paris city magazine, Paris Passion magazine; and he continued to write frequently about French and European politics and foreign affairs. Ireland was an assiduous promoter in the United States of the work of the prolific young French philosopher Michel Onfray.

Ireland was a columnist for The Village Voice, The New York Observer New York magazine, and the Paris daily Libération, among other publications. He was also a contributing editor of POZ, the monthly for the HIV-positive community, of the magazine In These Times, and the French satirical news website Bakchich. In the late 1990s, he was a contributor to The Nation. Sifry, a colleague of his at the time, wrote that "I think one of my most trying experiences as a young editor was being in the middle of his push to publish a damning indictment" of then-President Bill Clinton, and the editors' "discomfort with his ferocity and willingness to infer the worst from a mixed bag of solid facts and not-so-solid surmises." However, Sifry added that Ireland "was more right than not ... in the grand sense."

From mid-2005, Ireland was the Contributing Editor for International Affairs of Gay City News, the largest LGBTQ weekly newspaper in New York City and in the U.S.

=== Criticism ===
Ireland's reporting on Iran in the several years after 2005 drew harsh rebuttals from a number of Iranian activists, as well as from Scott Long, director of the LGBT Rights Program at Human Rights Watch. They charged that Ireland and Gay City News generally were uncritical in relying on sources who maintained that two young men hanged in Mashhad, Iran in mid-2005 –– after being convicted of raping an underage boy at a time when they themselves were underage –– had in fact been involved in consensual sex. Long and some other human rights advocates criticized activists and reporters, including Ireland and controversial British campaigner Peter Tatchell, saying they were engaging in unwarranted speculation about the motives for the case.

Ireland continued to produce articles claiming a pattern of "anti-gay" executions in Iran. However, no professional human rights organization ever endorsed these claims, or identified any recent case of persons sentenced to death for consensual homosexual conduct in Iran. Long and others became increasingly critical, charging that Ireland and others were making claims without evidence, and imputing a Western gay identity to Iranians coming from a very different cultural experience. The conflict between Long on one side and Ireland and Tatchell on the other side was at times vitriolic and led to a 2010 episode in which Human Rights Watch and Long apologized in writing to Tatchell. However, Long remained a critic of Ireland to the end, faulting him for relying excessively on single sources in his reporting, for intolerance toward Islam and for failing to understand complex international situations. In particular, Long claimed that Ireland had unduly promoted the career of the flamboyant Russian activist Nikolai Alekseev while ignoring other Russian groups. Alekseev had a record of erratic behavior and supporting far right-wing causes, and later engaged in anti-Semitic outbursts. Scott Tucker writes that "In his reports on the Russian gay movement, and especially of gay activist Nikolai Alexeyev, I found [Ireland] less reliable.... When he became increasingly confined by illness, he could not pretend to be a truly investigative journalist."

== Personal life ==
He was born in Duluth, Minnesota and later lived in Port Hueneme, California, where his father worked in the information office of the Naval Battalion Construction Center.

Ireland developed polio as a child as the result of his Christian Scientist parents refusing to allow him to receive the polio vaccine.

After nights out drinking with writers like Christopher Hitchens and Gore Vidal, Ireland gave up liquor.

In his final years, Ireland developed diabetes, kidney disease, severe sciatica, and weakened lungs and progressive muscle deterioration related to childhood polio. He also survived at least two major strokes. He often felt too ill to leave his apartment or have company. Ireland died in his East Village home on October 26, 2013.

Ireland's partner was Hervé Couergou. He died of AIDS in 1996.

=== Activism ===
A severe critic from the left of President Bill Clinton's presidency, Ireland for three years wrote a syndicated Clinton Watch column. He wrote extensively in opposition to President George H. W. Bush's Gulf War, as well as President George W. Bush's Iraq War and War in Afghanistan.

At an early age, Ireland was part of the early 1960s American New Left. He was a member of Students for a Democratic Society (SDS), and was elected to its National Council in 1963 at the age of 17. He also spent a year on the SDS national staff, as Assistant National Secretary, in 1963–64. Ireland dropped out of SDS in 1966 to devote his time to electoral organizing against the Vietnam War. As a staff member of the New Jersey Industrial Union Council AFL-CIO and the United Auto Workers Region 9-A, in 1967 he helped to organize the National Labor Leadership Assembly for Peace to oppose the Vietnam War.

He was involved in the Gay Activists Alliance (GAA) and Gay Liberation Front (GLF).
