= List of international presidential trips made by Moncef Marzouki =

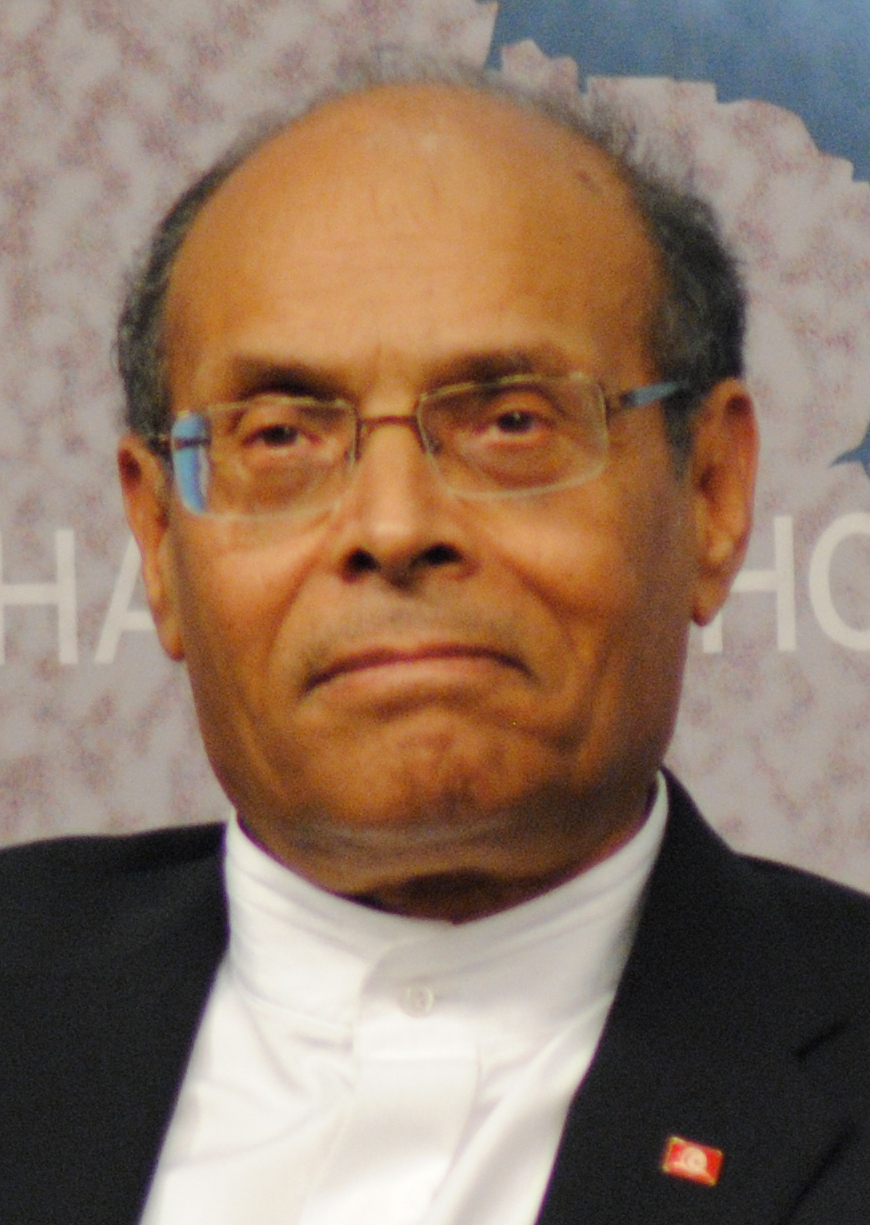
The President Moncef Marzouki.

This is a list of presidential trips made by Moncef Marzouki, the 3rd President of Tunisia. As of December 2014, Marzouki has made 38 international trips to 25 countries since his presidency began with his 13 December 2011 inauguration until the transfer of power on 31 December 2014, in addition to many more trips made domestically within Tunisia which are not shown on this list.

== International trips ==
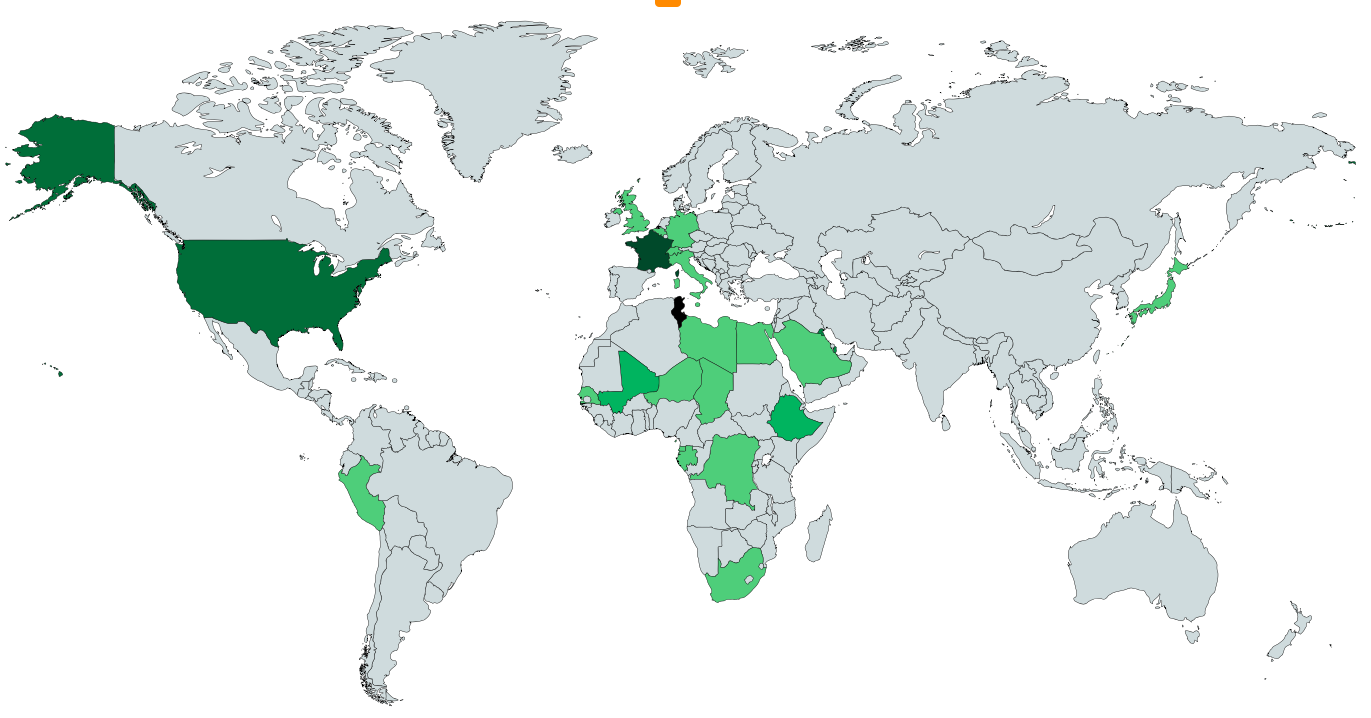

Number of visits	Country
1 visit	Libya, Egypt, Peru, Senegal, Malta, Democratic Republic of the Congo, United Kingdom, Saudi Arabia, Germany, Japan, South Africa, Switzerland, Belgium, Niger, Chad, Gabon, Equatorial Guinea, Italy, Vatican City.
2 visits	Ethiopia, Mali.
3 visits	Qatar, Kuwait.
4 visits	United States.
5 visits	France.

== 2012 ==
The following international trips were made by Moncef Marzouki during 2012:

Country	Areas visited	Date(s)	Notes
Libya	Tripoli	January 2	See also: Libya–Tunisia relations
Qatar	Doha	April 21	See also: Qatar–Tunisia relations
Ethiopia	Addis Ababa	July 15	
France	Paris	July 17	See also: France–Tunisia relations
Egypt	Cairo	August 16	See also: Egypt–Tunisia relations
Qatar	Doha	September 10	See also: Qatar–Tunisia relations
United States	New York City	September 27	See also: Tunisia–United States relations
Peru	Lima	October 1	
Senegal	Dakar	October 3	
Malta	Valletta	October 5	See also: Malta–Tunisia relations
Democratic Republic of the Congo	Kinshasa	October 14	
United Kingdom	London	November 27	See also: Tunisia–United Kingdom relations

== 2013 ==
The following international trips were made by Moncef Marzouki during 2013:

Country	Areas visited	Date(s)	Notes
Saudi Arabia	Riyadh	January 21	
Ethiopia	Addis Ababa	January 27	
Kuwait	Kuwait City	January 29	
France	Paris	February 5	See also: France–Tunisia relations
Germany	Berlin	March 21	
Qatar	Doha	March 25	See also: Qatar–Tunisia relations
Japan	Tokyo	Mayo 30	
Mali	Bamako	September 18	
United States	New York City	September 22	See also: Tunisia–United States relations
France	Paris	November 5	See also: France–Tunisia relations
Kuwait	Kuwait City	November 18	
France	Paris	December 6	See also: France–Tunisia relations
South Africa	Soweto (Johannesburg)	December 10	

== 2014 ==
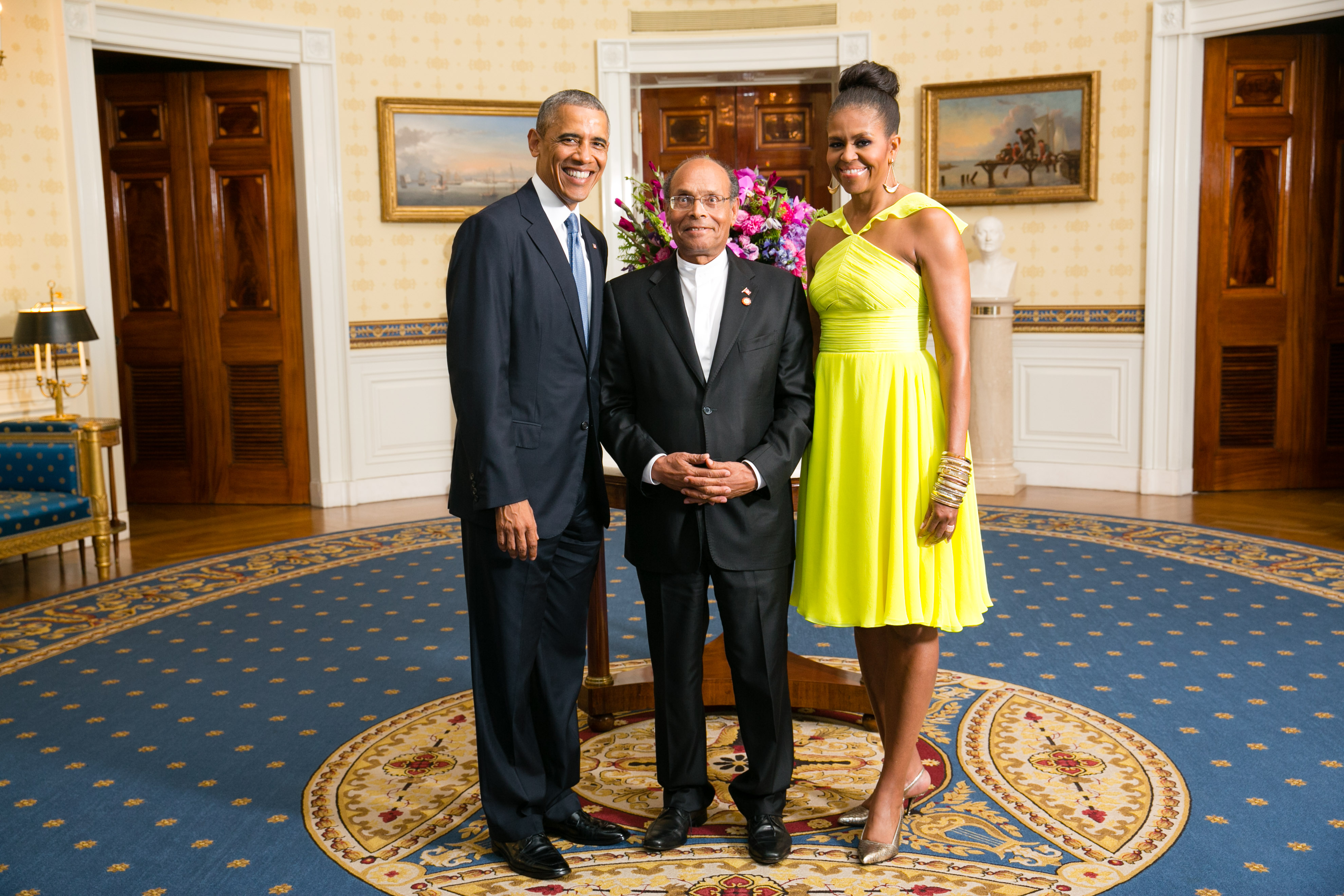
The President Moncef Marzouki with President Barack Obama and Michelle Obama, August 5, 2014.

The following international trips were made by Moncef Marzouki during 2014:

Country	Areas visited	Date(s)	Notes
Switzerland	Geneva	March 2	
Kuwait	Kuwait City	March 24	
Belgium	Brussels	April 1	
Mali	Bamako	June 20	
Niger	Niamey	June 22	
Chad	N'Djamena	June 23	
Gabon	Libreville	June 24	
Equatorial Guinea	Malabo	June 26	
United States	Washington, D.C.	August 4	See also: Tunisia–United States relations
France	Paris, Toulon	August 14	See also: France–Tunisia relations
Italy	Rome	September 10	See also: Italy–Tunisia relations
Vatican City	Vatican City	September 11	
United States	New York City	September 22	See also: Tunisia–United States relations
