= Rambouillet stabbing =

2021 Islamic stabbing attack in France

Rambouillet knife attack
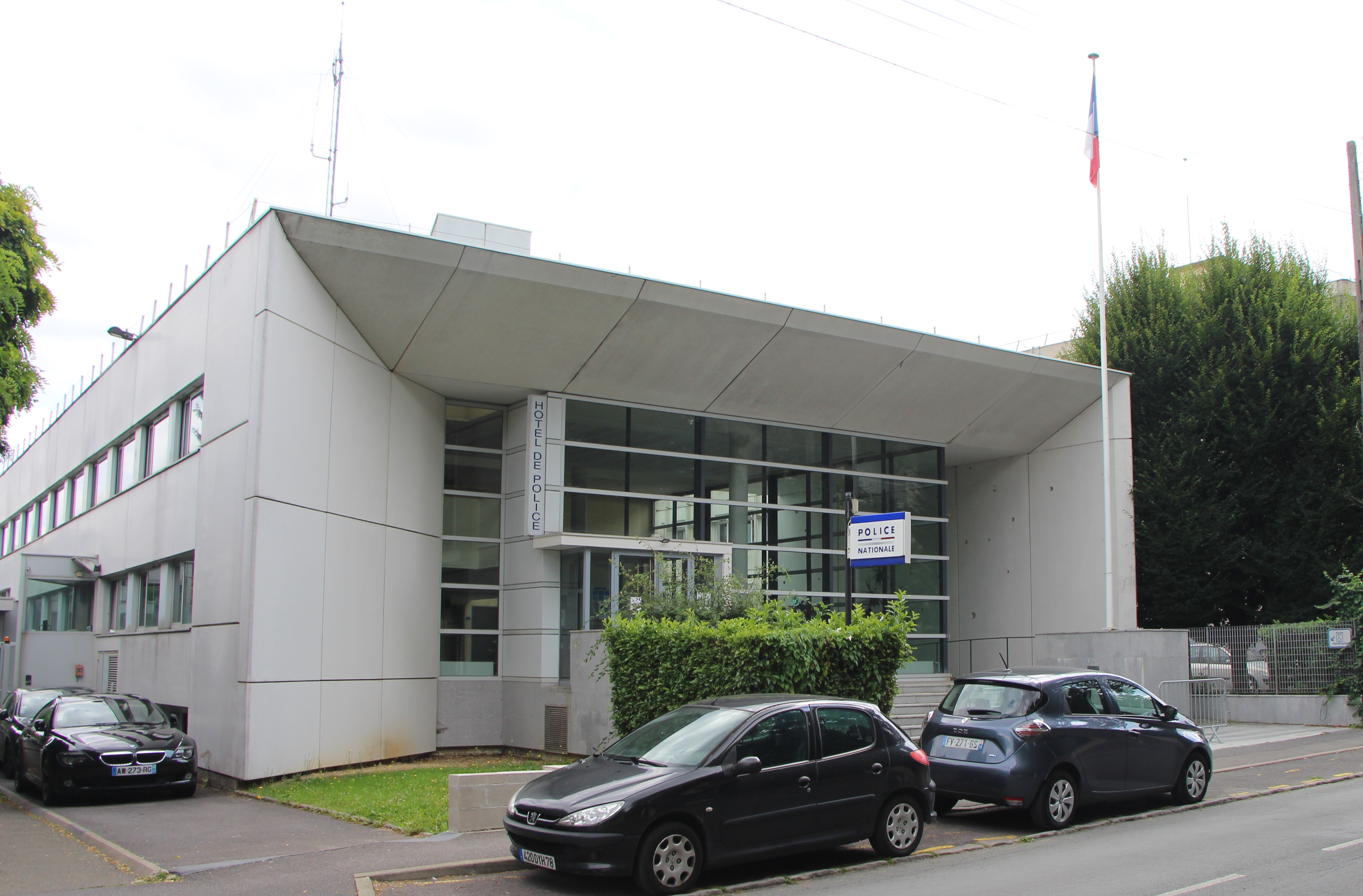
- Rambouillet police station, scene of the attack
- Location: Rambouillet, France
- Date: 23 April 2021
- Target: Police employee
- Attack type: Stabbing
- Weapon: Knife
- Deaths: 2 (including the perpetrator)
- Injuries: 0
- Perpetrator: Jamel Gorchene
- Motive: Islamic extremism

On 23 April 2021, 36-year-old Jamel Gorchene stabbed a police employee to death at a police station in Rambouillet, France.

== Attack ==
At around 2:20pm on 23 April 2021 a fatal stabbing occurred in Rambouillet, Yvelines, Île-de-France. An unarmed administrative assistant named Stéphanie Monfermé was stabbed in the throat twice and died soon after. The perpetrator was then shot dead by police.

== Attacker ==
The attacker was named as Jamel Gorchene, a 36-year-old Tunisian man who arrived in France illegally in 2009 who was not known to security services. He lived illegally in France for ten years until he obtained residency papers in 2020 which were valid until December 2021. He had recently moved to Rambouillet.

He was not previously known to Tunisian or French police services. His Facebook posts were almost exclusively concerned with the defence of the Muslim community and Islamophobia, as well as the posts of Éric Zemmour.

In October 2020, a few days after the murder of Samuel Paty, a teacher who showed depictions of Muhammed in class, Jamel Gorchene joined a campaign named Respectez Muhammed prophète de Dieu (Respect Muhammed, prophet of God) and changed his Facebook profile picture. According to journalist Nicolas Beau, since 2009 Jamel Gorchene had been the subject of slow but progressive radicalization which had escaped the notice of government surveillance agencies. He had been influenced by the radical teachings of Sheikh Ali al-Qaradaghi, whom he followed assiduously and retweeted.

Gorchene watched videos which glorified and encouraged martyrdom and jihad before his attack.

== Victim ==
The dead woman, Stéphanie Monfermé, was a 49-year-old mother of two. She was born on 1 February 1972 in Coutances, Normandy, and raised in Montmartin-sur-Mer, Manche before moving to Saint-Léger-en-Yvelines. She had worked for the police for 28 years in administration. As she was not a police officer, she did not wear a uniform or carry a sidearm.

A ceremony held in Rambouillet 26 April to commemorate Monfermé was attended by government ministers, her husband and two daughters, and hundreds of French mourners.

== Reaction ==
Prime Minister Jean Castex and Interior Minister Gérald Darmanin visited the scene of the attack and president Emmanuel Macron visited the family of the victim.

An investigation into the attack was launched by the French Parquet national antiterroriste (PNAT). Macron reaffirmed his opposition to Islamic terrorism. National Rally leader Marine Le Pen criticised the decision to grant French residency to an illegal immigrant and advocated for their deportation.
