= Nicolas Beau =

French journalist and writer

Nicolas Beau (born 2 June 1952) is a French journalist and writer.

== Biography ==
Beau completed secondary education at l'école Saint-Martin de France, in Pontoise, run by Father Dabosville, a representative of open catholicism; He graduated from IEP Paris in 1973. He worked for Quotidien du Médecin, Le Monde, Libération, Agence CAPA, Le Nouvel Économiste, L'Expansion and as an investigative journalist with Canard enchaîné. He was also editor-in-chief of the satirical website Bakchich.

He also wrote for the website Marianne between 2011 and 2013.

Afterwards he created Mondafrique, a website covering French-speaking Africa (the Maghreb and West Africa).

== Publications ==
- Paris, capitale arabe, Le Seuil, 1995.
- Notre ami Ben Ali, l'envers du miracle tunisien, La Découverte, 1999. With Jean-Pierre Tuquoi.
- La Maison Pasqua, Plon, 2002.
- SNCF, la machine infernale, Le Cherche midi, 2004. With Laurence Dequay et Marc Fressoz.
- Une imposture française, Les Arènes, 2006. A book on Bernard-Henri Lévy with Olivier Toscer.
- Quand le Maroc sera islamiste, La Découverte, 2006. With Catherine Graciet.
- L'incroyable Histoire du compte japonais de Jacques Chirac, Les Arènes, 2008. With Olivier Toscer.
- La Régente de Carthage : Main basse sur la Tunisie, La Découverte, 2009. WIth Catherine Graciet.
- Tunis et Paris : les liaisons dangereuses, Jean-Claude Gawsewitch, 2011. With Arnaud Muller.
- Le Vilain Petit Qatar – Cet ami qui nous veut du mal, Fayard, 2013. With Jacques-Marie Bourget
- Papa Hollande au Mali : Chronique d'un fiasco annoncé, Balland, 2013 ISBN 978-2-35315-230-8
- Les beurgeois de la République, Seuil, 2016.
