= Éric Laurent (journalist) =

French journalist (born 1947)

Éric Laurent (born 1947) is a French journalist who is best known for his work on the finance and geopolitics of the oil business, and for his work on Morocco and its government.

According to Edwin McDowell, writing in the "Book Notes" column of The New York Times, Pierre Salinger and Éric Laurent's 1991 book Secret Dossier: The Hidden Agenda Behind the Gulf War, was "already a bestseller in France" at the time, and that the book "contends that the United States Government helped undercut efforts by King Hussein of Jordan to find a nonmilitary solution after President Saddam Hussein invaded Kuwait. It also claims to show how war could have been avoided."

According to Aurelian Breeden, writing for The New York Times, Laurent has "established a reputation" as a "fierce critic" of the Moroccan leadership. He was arrested in August 2015 (along with co-author Catherine Graciet) for allegedly accepting a bribe to not publish books about the Moroccan leadership ever again. Both authors "do not deny that a financial transaction took place", but that it was either "a trap" or "a private transaction."

On March 15, 2023, Éric Laurent and Catherine Graciet, were sentenced in Paris to a one-year suspended prison sentence and a fine of 10,000 euros.

== Books ==
- Secret Dossier; The Hidden Agenda Behind the Gulf War, 1991, with Pierre Salinger
- Hassan II: la memoire d'un roi: Entretiens avec Eric Laurent 1993
- Bush's Secret World: Religion, Big Business and Hidden Networks, 2004
- La face cachée du 11 Septembre, 2004
- Le roi prédateur, 2012, with Catherine Graciet
