= Qatar–Tunisia relations =

- Qatar: Tunisia

Qatar–Tunisia relations are the bilateral relations between the State of Qatar and the Republic of Tunisia. Qatar is a heavy investor in Tunisia, and ranks second globally in terms of foreign direct investments in Tunisia. The two enjoyed close political relations during the Ennahda Movement's assumption of power in Tunisia in 2011. Both countries are members of the Arab League, Organisation of Islamic Cooperation, Non-Aligned Movement, Group of 77 and the United Nations.

== Diplomatic representation ==
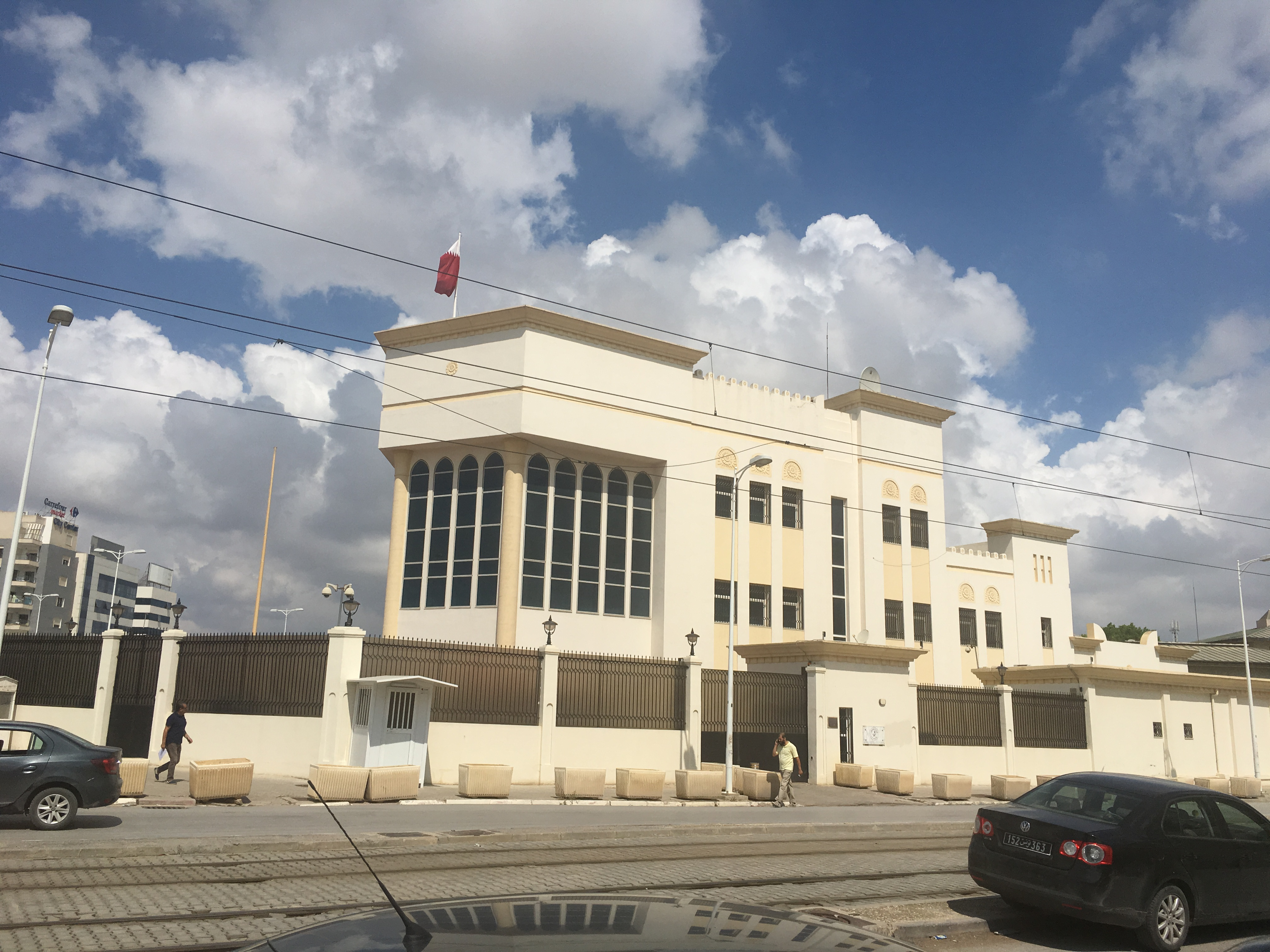
Qatari embassy in Tunisia

Qatar maintains an embassy in Tunis.

Tunisia has an embassy in Doha.

== High level visits ==
In June 2017, during the 2017 Qatar diplomatic crisis, Qatar's State Minister for Foreign Affairs, Sultan bin Saad Al Muraikhi, met with Tunisian president Beji Caid Essebsi to discuss international matters of interest.

== History ==
During the reign of Zine El Abidine Ben Ali as President of Tunisia, Qatar's media network Al Jazeera often denounced his actions, and its editorial line embraced the Tunisian Revolution, which led to his ouster in 2011.

Relations between Qatar and Tunisia improved immensely between 2011 and 2013, when Ennahda Movement-affiliated candidate Hamadi Jebali was declared Prime Minister of Tunisia in the 2011 Tunisian Constituent Assembly elections. Cooperation in all fields gradually started picking up traction; for instance, the two governments signed ten bilateral agreements in 2012.

When Ennahda relinquished power in 2014, Qatar continued supporting Tunisia's government in the form of financial aid and loans. Qatar also cast Tunisia in a positive light through two of its most influential news organizations, Al-Araby Al-Jadeed and Al Jazeera.

Qatar's ambassador to Tunisia paid $2.2 million for Tunisia to host an international investment conference in November 2016. Moreover, during the conference, Qatar pledged $1.25 billion in aid to Tunisia in an effort to help improve its economy.

The Qatar-Tunisia Joint Higher Committee was formed to deliberate over issues of mutual interest.

=== 2017 Qatari diplomatic crisis ===
On 5 June 2017, a number of states led by Saudi Arabia cut ties with Qatar. Tunisia adopted a neutral stance on this issue, calling for the parties to negotiate a solution to the dispute.

Moncef Marzouki, president of Tunisia from 2011 to 2014, supported Qatar's position against the blockading countries.

== Economic relations ==
Qatar is among the largest Arab investors in Tunisia. In 1982, the Tunisian-Qatari Investment Bank was formed. By the end of 1983, it was reported that the bank had invested the equivalent of $20 million into the Tunisian economy, and had a total capital of DT 70 million.

Qatar's investments in Tunisia in 2015 exceeded QR 4 billion, making it Tunisia's most important Arab partner and second-most important global partner in terms of foreign direct investment.

== COVID-19 pandemic ==
During the COVID-19 pandemic, Qatar provided urgent medical assistance to Tunisia in July 2021. Qatar delivered respirators, ventilators and a fully-equipped field hospital with a capacity of 200 beds.

== See also ==
- Foreign relations of Qatar
- Foreign relations of Tunisia
