= Paris Passion =

- Type: City Magazine
- Format: Magazine
- Publisher: Robert Sarner, Michael Budman, Don Green, Tony Elliott
- Editor: Robert Sarner
- Founded: 1981
- Ceased publication: 1991
- Headquarters: Paris, France
- ISSN: 0293-0781

Paris Passion, also known as Passion, was an English-language city magazine in France that existed from 1981 to 1991. Its main editorial focus was on life in Paris for both residents and visitors. Launched on a shoestring budget as a 24-page black-and-white tabloid, Passion eventually evolved into a 140-page magazine.

Passion was conceived as a forum for the written word and to showcase the visual side of Paris. It regularly published excellent photography and benefited from the pool of creative illustrators in Paris. The magazine's use of strong eye-catching visuals on its large format covers was an influential part of its identity.

== History ==
Launched in November 1981, Paris Passion was an English-language magazine in France that existed until early 1991. Its main editorial focus was on life in Paris for both residents and visitors. Also known as Passion, it featured an eclectic mix of feature journalism, interviews with leading figures in Paris, city consumer advice, coverage of French arts, culture, politics, design, architecture, food and fashion and was also a regular showcase for excellent photography. For many years, Passion also had a detachable events-listings section, published short fiction by Paris-based writers, a French-language section, and a separate fashion supplement called Accent.

First Issue, November 1981

Despite good distribution and a relatively high profile in Paris, Passion was more a critical success than a financial one. Its financial struggle undermined the magazine's full editorial potential. Passion began on a shoestring budget as a 24-page black-and-white tabloid and eventually evolved into a full-fledged glossy 140-page magazine. Over its nine-plus years, Passion published 78 issues.

At its peak, the circulation reached 50,000 copies, with almost a quarter of that distributed outside France. It was sold and displayed prominently in news kiosks and bookstores in Paris and even had street hawkers selling it in certain parts of the city. It was available in international newsstands in New York City, Los Angeles, Chicago, Boston, Toronto, Montreal, London, and Amsterdam and had subscribers in many countries.

In addition to its practical information and arts and entertainment coverage, Passion gained popularity for its humorous commentary on the French and the social conditions of Paris life.

It did not shy away from serious issues. It tackled everything from the political intrigues at Paris City Hall to urban planning fiascoes to anti-Semitism in France to drug-related social problems in Paris to the plight of North African immigrants in France and a variety of environmental concerns.

Passion can be seen as part of the time-honored tradition of expatriate English-language publishing in Paris that dates back to the early 20th century. Over the years, there have been numerous, mostly literary, publications published in English in the French capital, most of them short-lived.

Passion was founded by expatriate Canadian journalist Robert Sarner. He moved to Paris in 1979 from Toronto where he had begun his career in journalism a few years earlier. Before starting Passion, Sarner took part in the Paris-based 'Journalists In Europe' fellowship program. His partners in the magazine were Michael Budman and Don Green, both originally from Detroit and the co-founders of Roots Canada Ltd. (a successful apparel company and lifestyle brand). Sarner was the Editor-in-Chief and Publisher, while Budman and Green were the Executive Publishers. Sarner had first met Budman and Green in Canada a few years earlier when he approached them for investment in a city magazine that he had hoped to launch in Toronto.

In 1988, the London-based city magazine Time Out purchased the majority of Paris Passion. Time Out's owner Tony Elliott became the co-publisher with Robert Sarner who also remained the Editor-in-Chief.

Under the new ownership, Passion adopted a more conventional physical format, expanded its staff and moved into new, better-equipped headquarters. Two and a half years later, following a difference of opinion over the direction of the magazine, Elliott squeezed out Sarner in mid-1990. Elliott then brought in staff from London, redesigned the magazine, and changed the editorial style from American to British. But the business faltered further and Time Out ended up closing the magazine in 1991.

In the 1990s, Time Out used the Paris Passion name in conjunction with some of the annual Paris guides it published during that period.

== Editorial content ==
Paris Passion was conceived as both a forum for the written word and a showcase of the visual side of the city. One of its main objectives was to engage both the minds and the eyes of readers. To that end, the magazine drew on a wealth of freelance talent based in Paris that shared the editorial aims of its editors. Despite limited financial means, Passion featured well-established journalists, photographers and illustrators while also developing many younger writers who had rarely been published before.

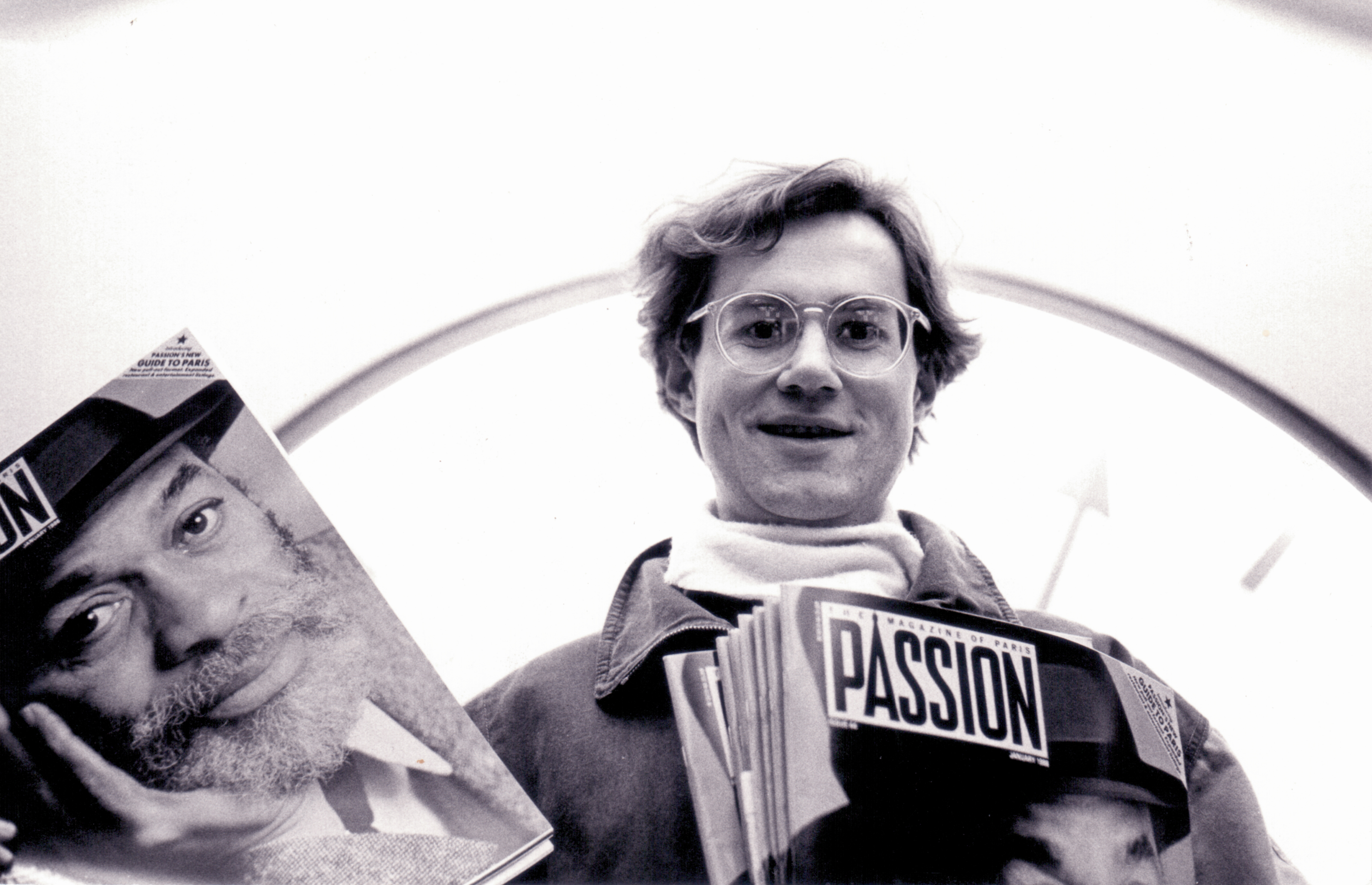
Street vendor proposing Paris Passion in the Café Costes in Paris

Like the rest of the magazine, Paris Passion's front covers evolved considerably from the time of its first issue in 1981 until the last in 1991. The changes included going from black-and-white images to those in full color; from newsprint to glossy stock; from celebrity portraits to more conceptual illustrations; and different logos and varying approaches to the use of text.

During the life of Passion, its use of strong, eye-catching visuals on its large format covers was an influential part of its identity. Passion favored simple, clean, bold, colorful images to grab the attention of readers. It stemmed, in part, from the fact that as a magazine relying mainly on newsstands for its distribution, it had to stand out from other publications in order to establish and promote itself, especially in the absence of any marketing budget.

In Paris, in addition to its presence on newsstands and in kiosks, Passion also had a network of "street hawkers" who sold the magazine. They circulated in places where potential readers would congregate, from hip cafes and restaurants to major cultural events, fashion shows and tourist attractions where hawkers would hold up the latest issue for all to see, and hopefully buy. The cover played a critical role in determining the perception and sales of the magazine.

In the pursuit of effective images for its covers, Passion drew from the presence of many different photographers and illustrators in Paris. Many artists liked seeing their work showcased on the covers of Passion, thanks to its large size, its relatively unobtrusive cover text and good visibility in Paris kiosks and in international bookstores and newsstands in major cities outside France.

== Advertising ==
As the magazine evolved, it caught the attention of an increasing number of media buyers at Paris-based advertising agencies who purchased space on behalf of their clients. Throughout its existence, Passion earned substantial advertising support, especially from companies in the fashion, food, travel and other lifestyle sectors.

In 1990, as part of Passion's relationship with the French advertising industry and Paris-based advertisers, and at the suggestion of its friend, ad man Marc Drillech, along with Director of Advertising, André Goldstein, the magazine produced a pocket English-French/French-English advertising and marketing lexicon. Titled Make Sense, it was well received by members of the Paris advertising community who found the free guide a highly useful tool for their work.
