= Tunisians in France =

People of Tunisian descent living in France

Total population
- 1,383,000 (2023)

Languages
- French (Maghrebi French), Arabic (Tunisian Arabic)

Religion
- Majority Islam (Sunni Islam); Minority Judaism, Irreligion, Christianity

Related ethnic groups
- Moroccans in France; Algerians in France

Tunisians in France are people of Tunisian descent living in France. People of Tunisian origin account for a large sector of the total population in France. Following France's colonial rule in Tunisia from 1881 to 1956, many Tunisians chose to immigrate to France from the 1960s to the present due to France's favorable economic conditions, while others sought to escape Tunisia's relatively unfavorable living conditions. The early 1980s saw a boom of the Tunisian community in France because of adjustments (over 22,000 cases).

== Demographics ==
The 2011 census recorded 150,109 Tunisian-born people.

Year	Tunisian-born population	+ descendance	Foreigners	Migrants	Other data
1999	220,039		120,713		154,000
2005	365,782				
2006	368,463				
2007	370,552				144,000
2008	370,667	577,998			
2009					
2010					
2011			150,109	246,274	
2012		668,668			
2013					

Family reunification:
Year	2003	2004	2005	2006	2007	2008	2009	2010	2011	2012	2013
Persons	2937	2433	2612	2311	2085	1632	1643	1952	1853	1870	1780
Families	1418	1230	1379	1361	1295	1106	1123	1301	1285	1339	1355

== Notable people ==
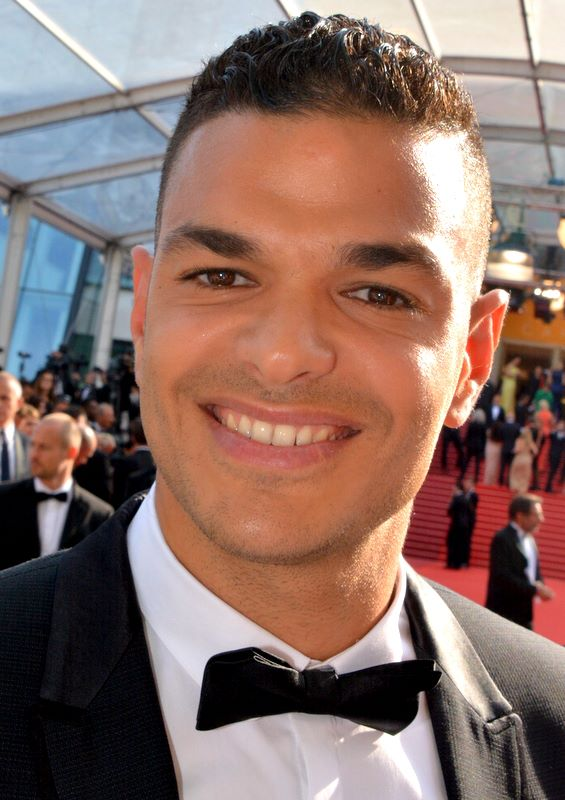
Hatem Ben Arfa

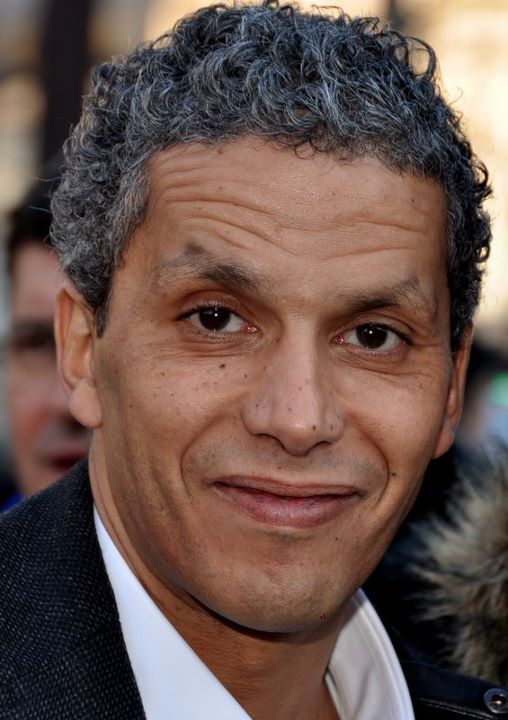
Sami Bouajila

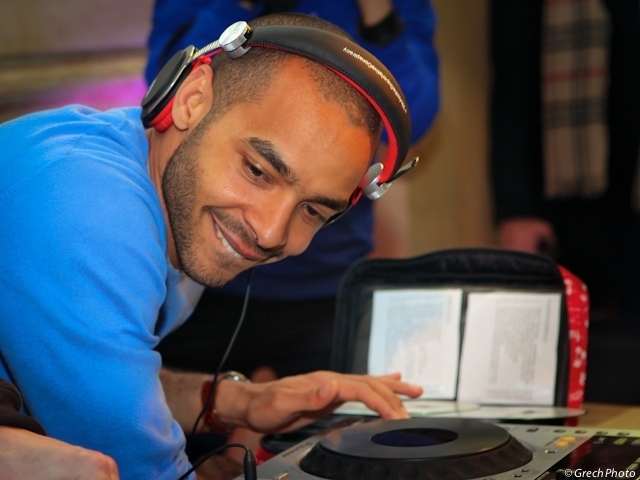
DJ Mehdi

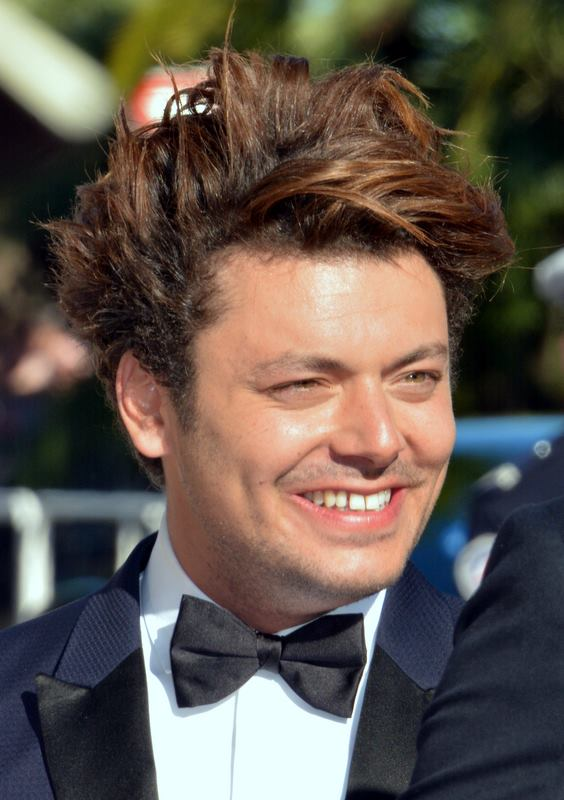
Kev Adams

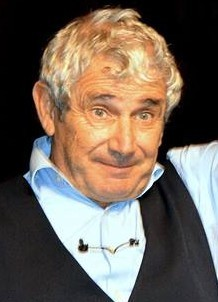
Michel Boujenah

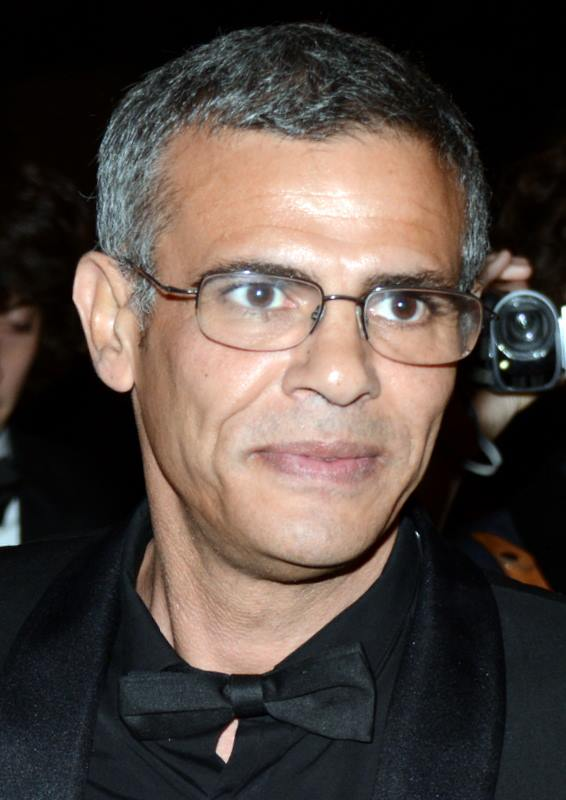
Abdellatif Kechiche

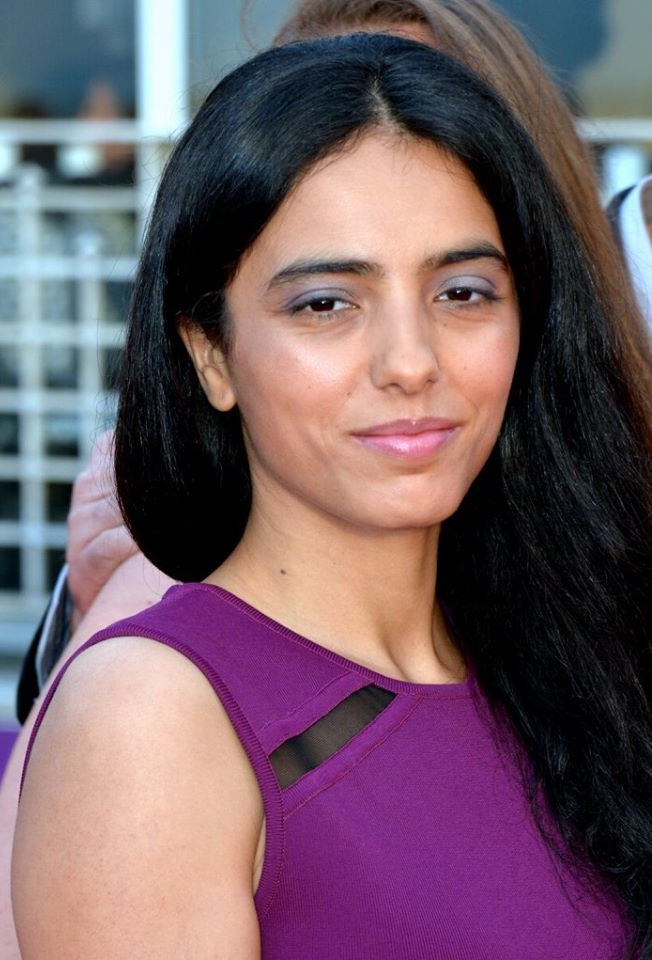
Hafsia Herzi

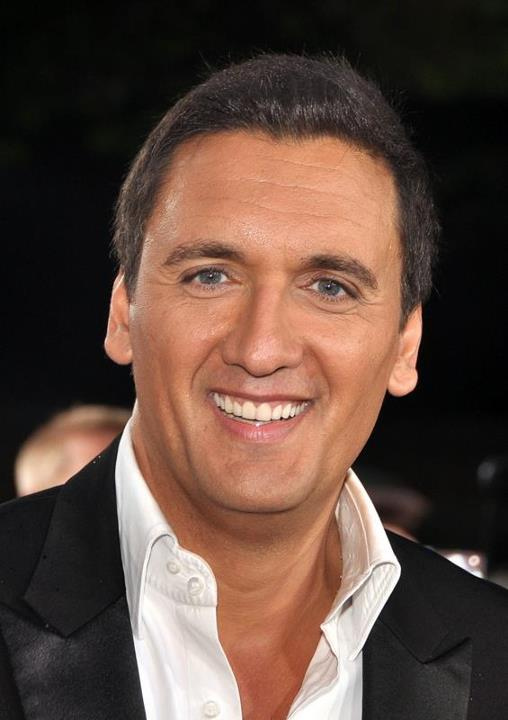
Dany Brillant

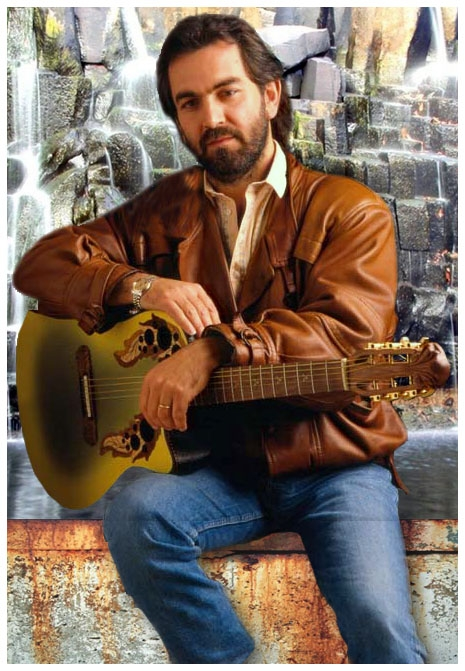
Marcel Dadi

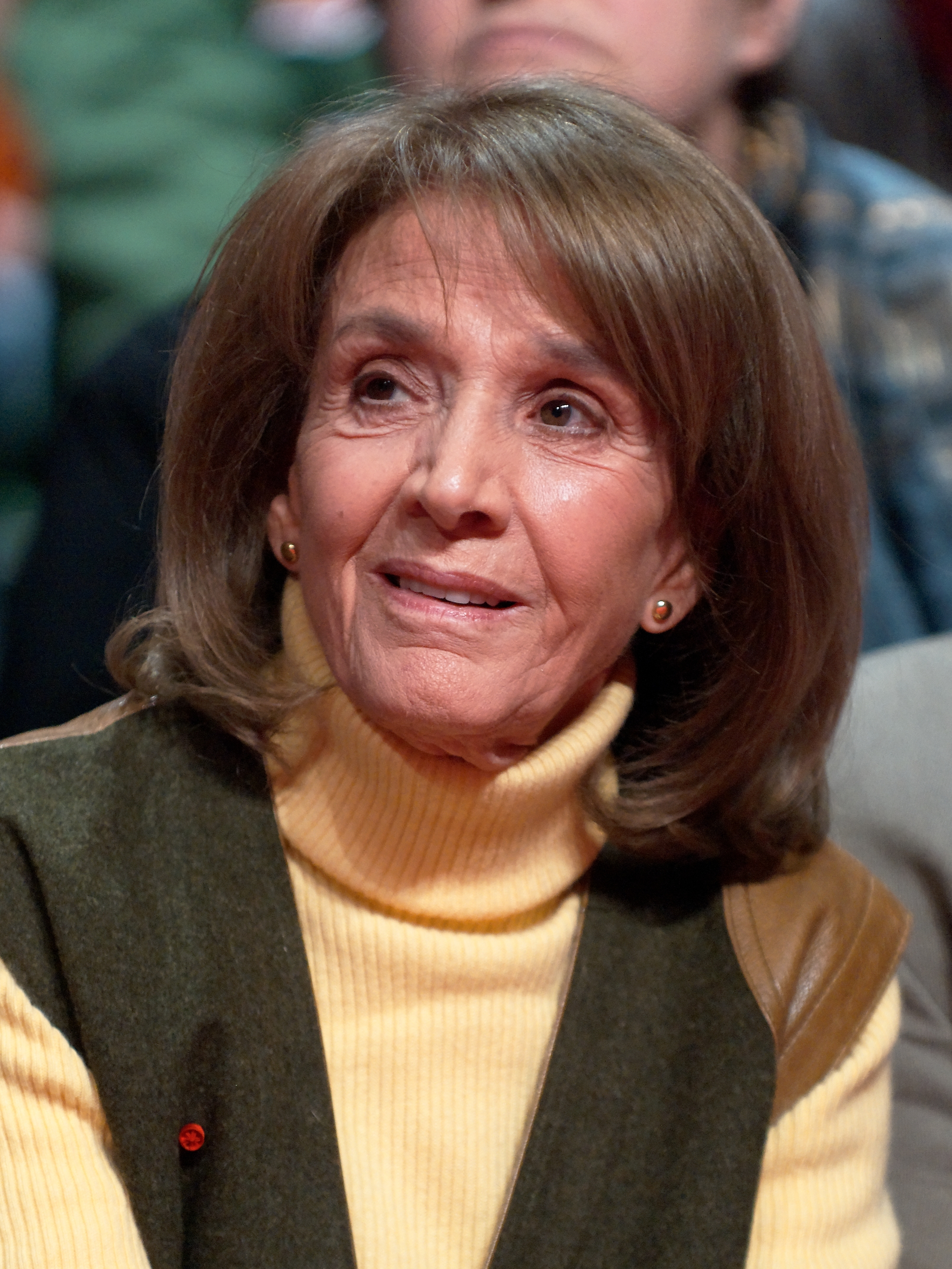
Gisèle Halimi

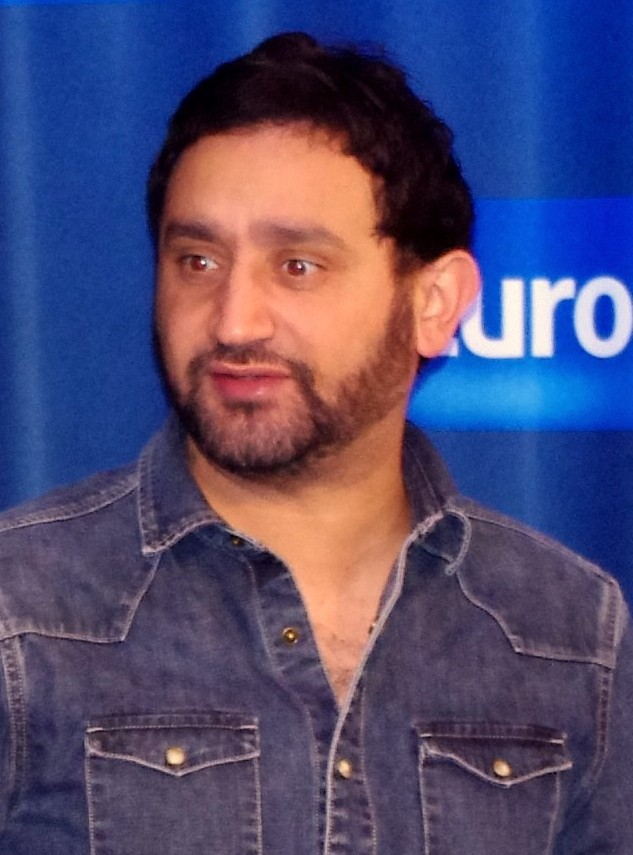
Cyril Hanouna

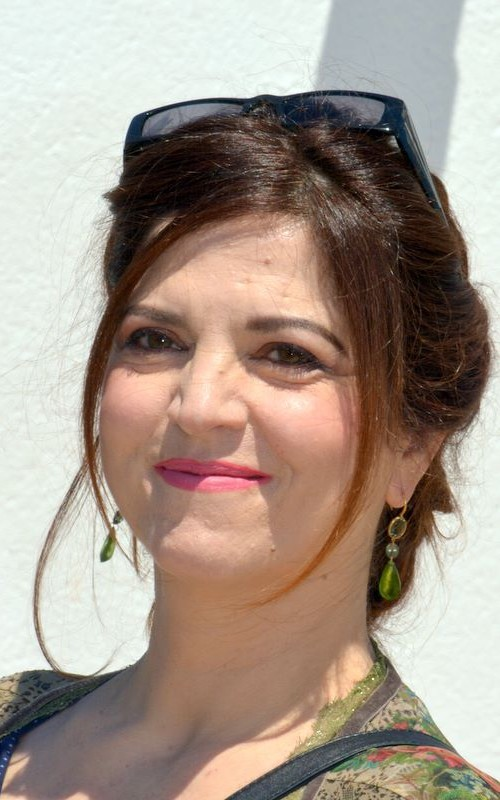
Agnès Jaoui

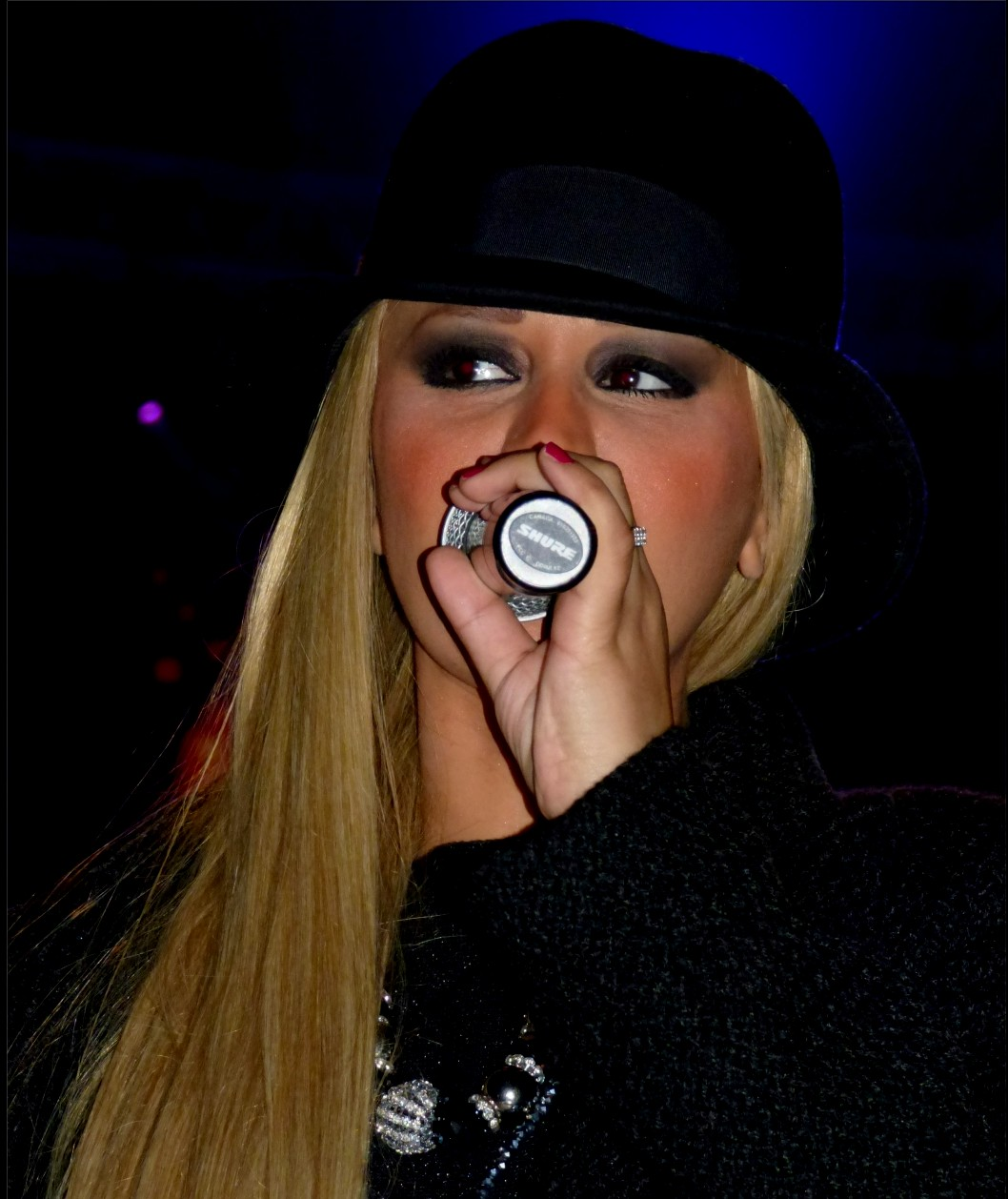
Lââm

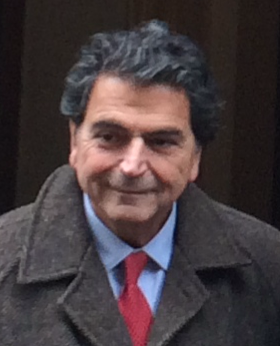
Pierre Lellouche

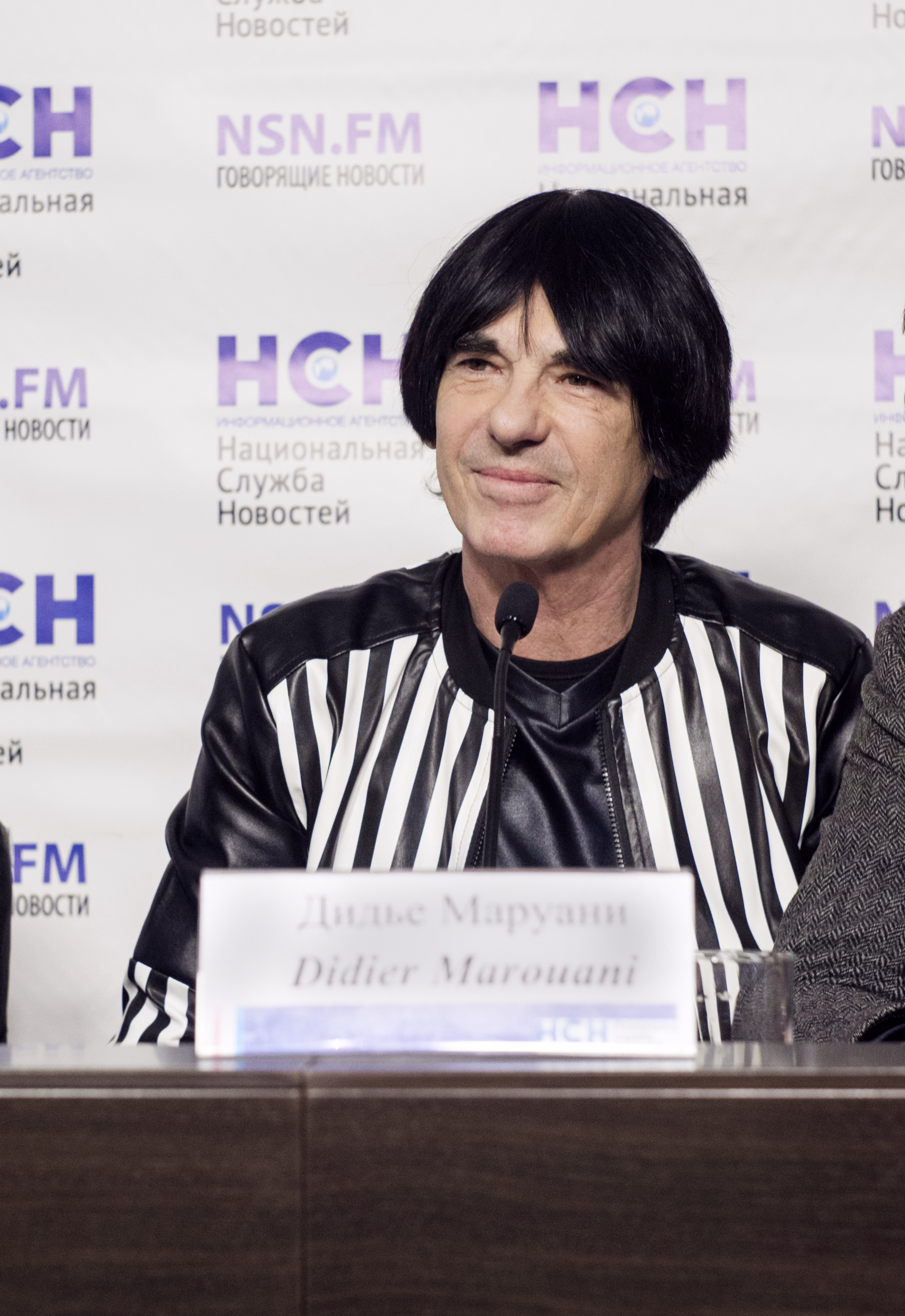
Didier Marouani

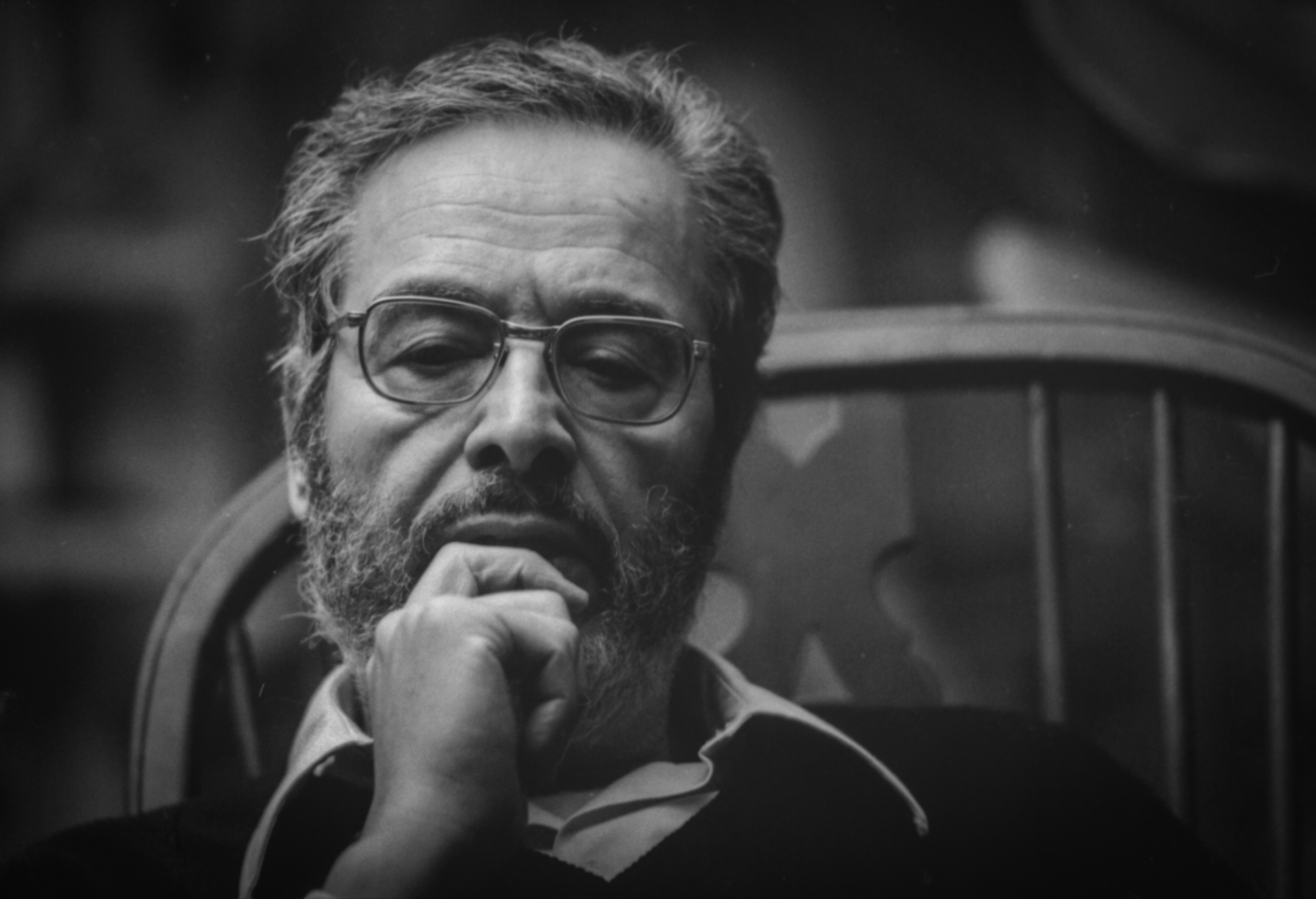
Albert Memmi

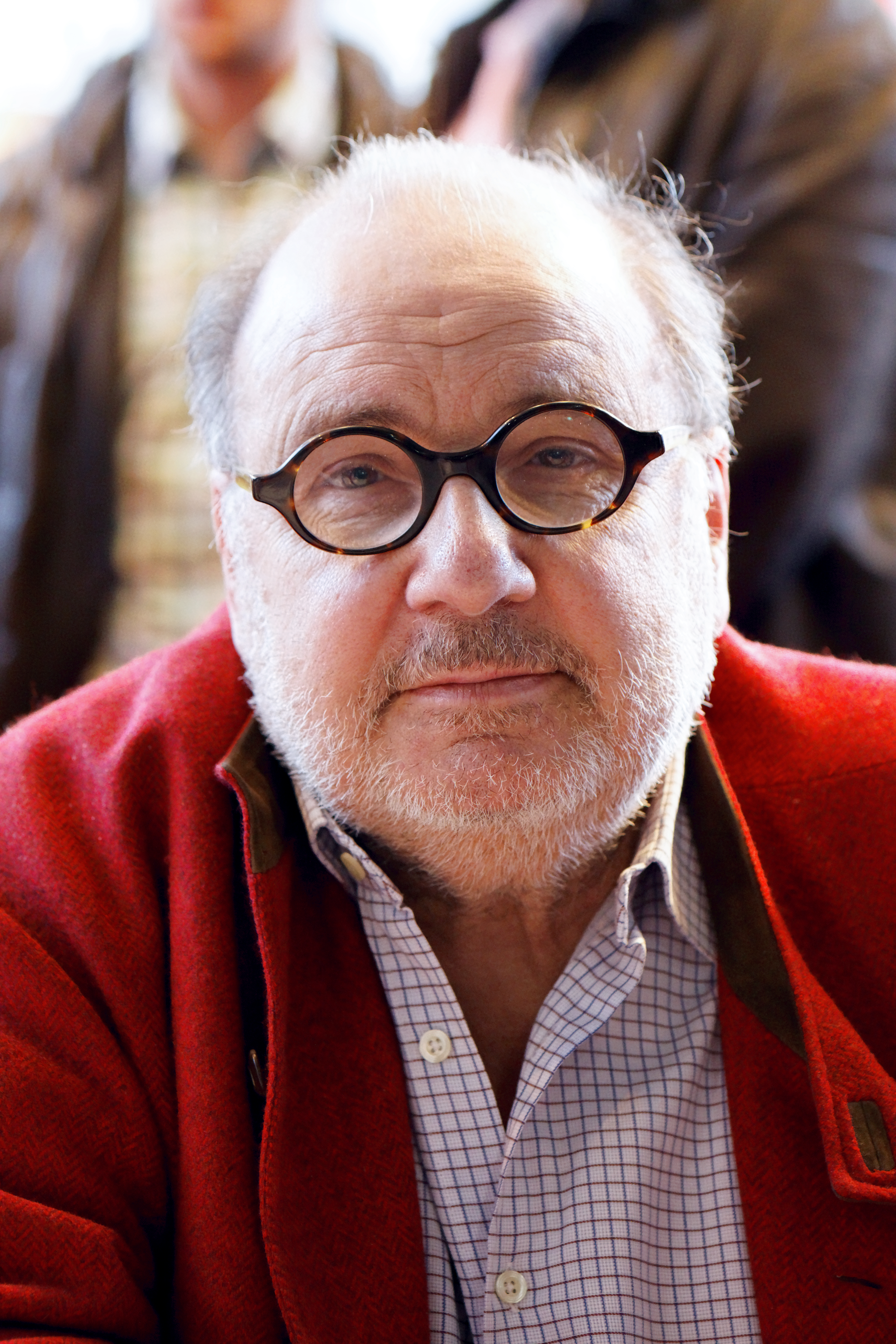
Serge Moati

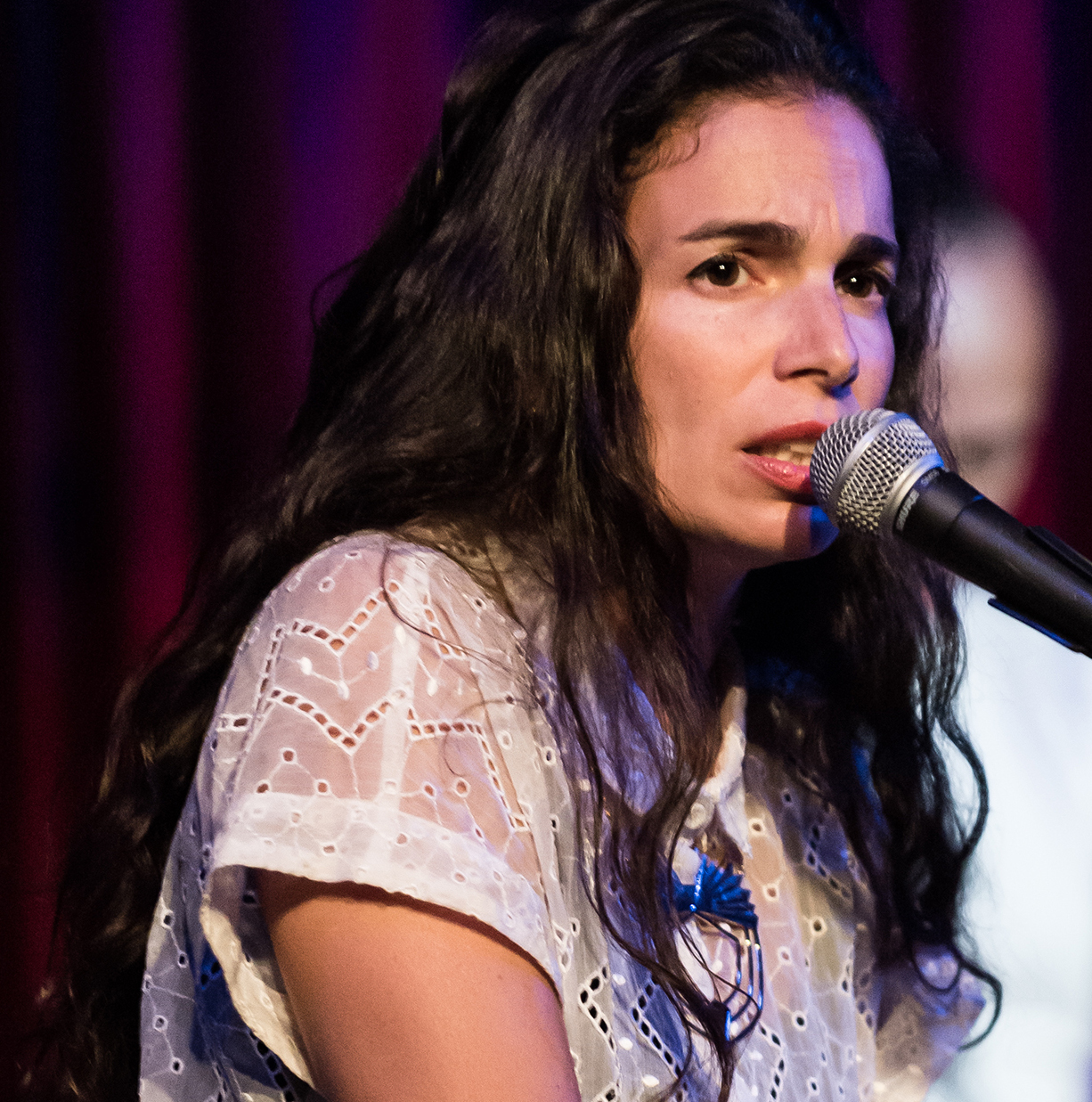
Yael Naim

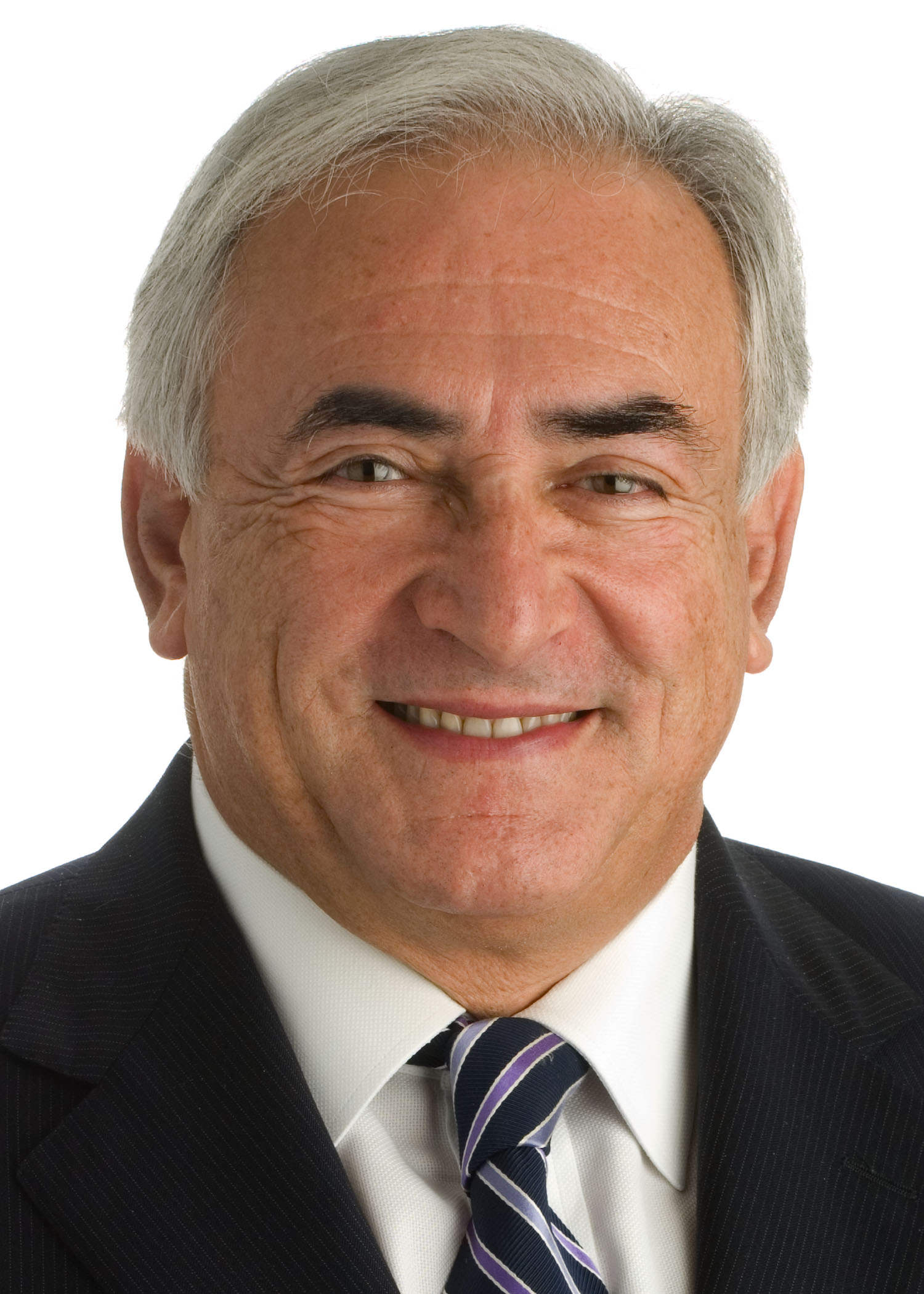
Dominique Strauss-Kahn

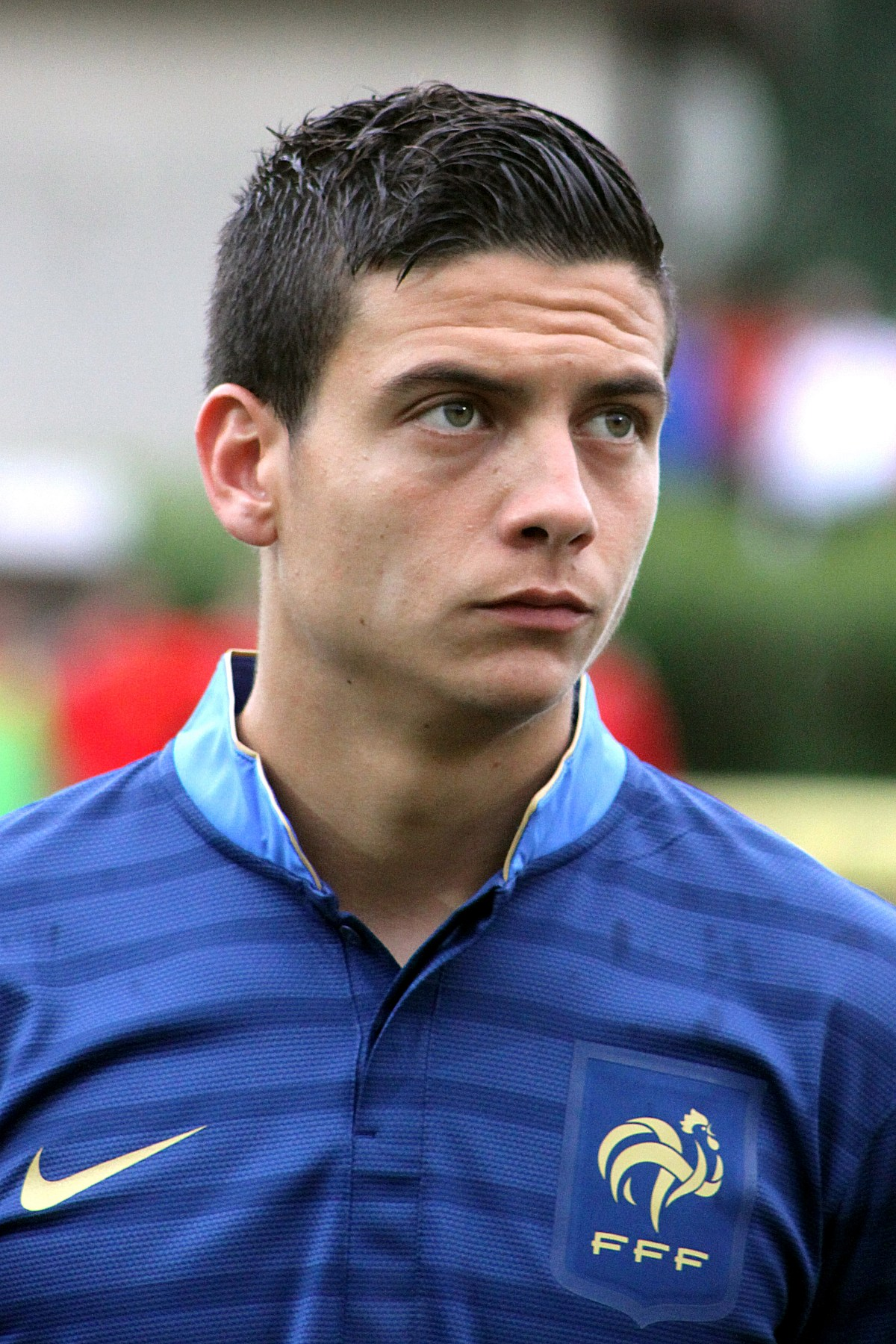
Larry Azouni

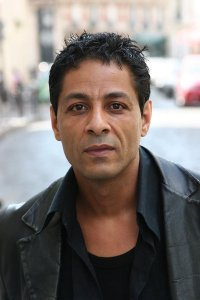
Hichem Yacoubi

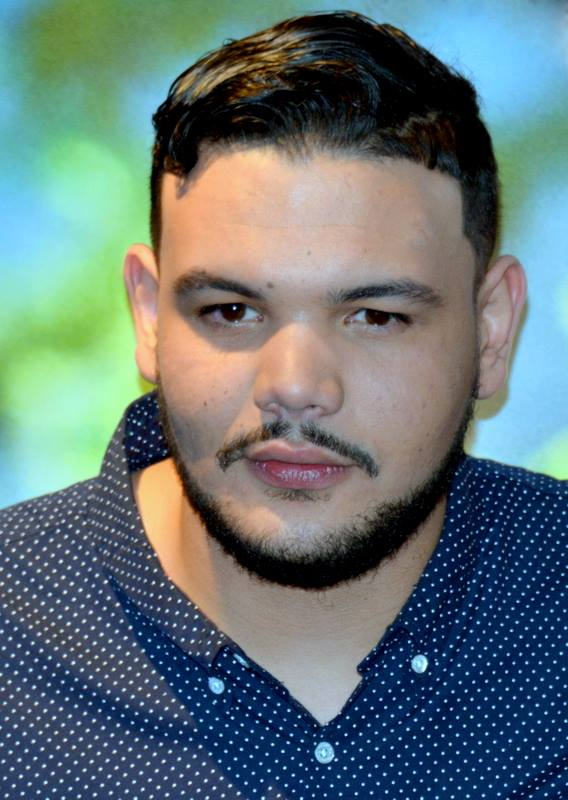
Sadek

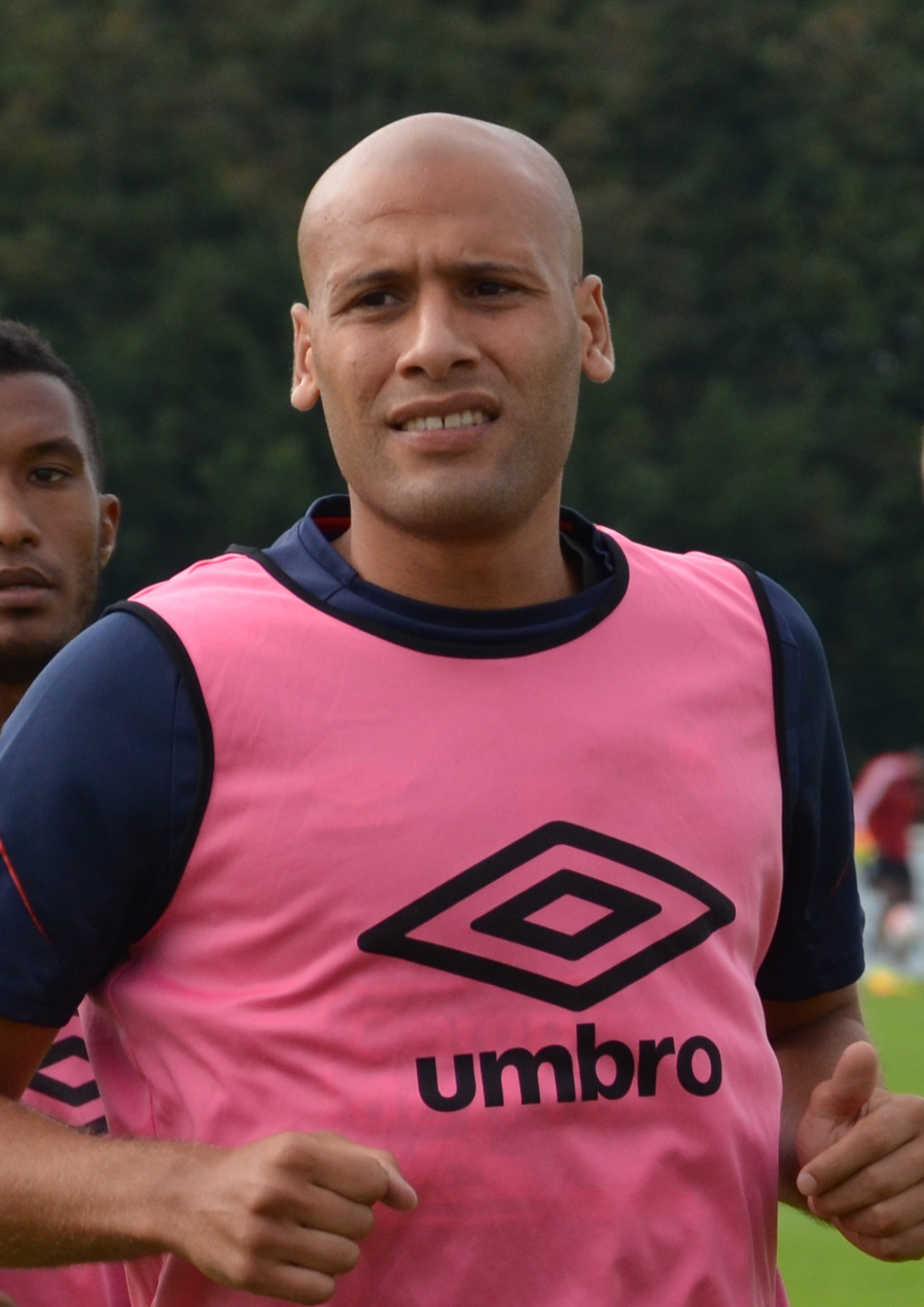
Alaeddine Yahia

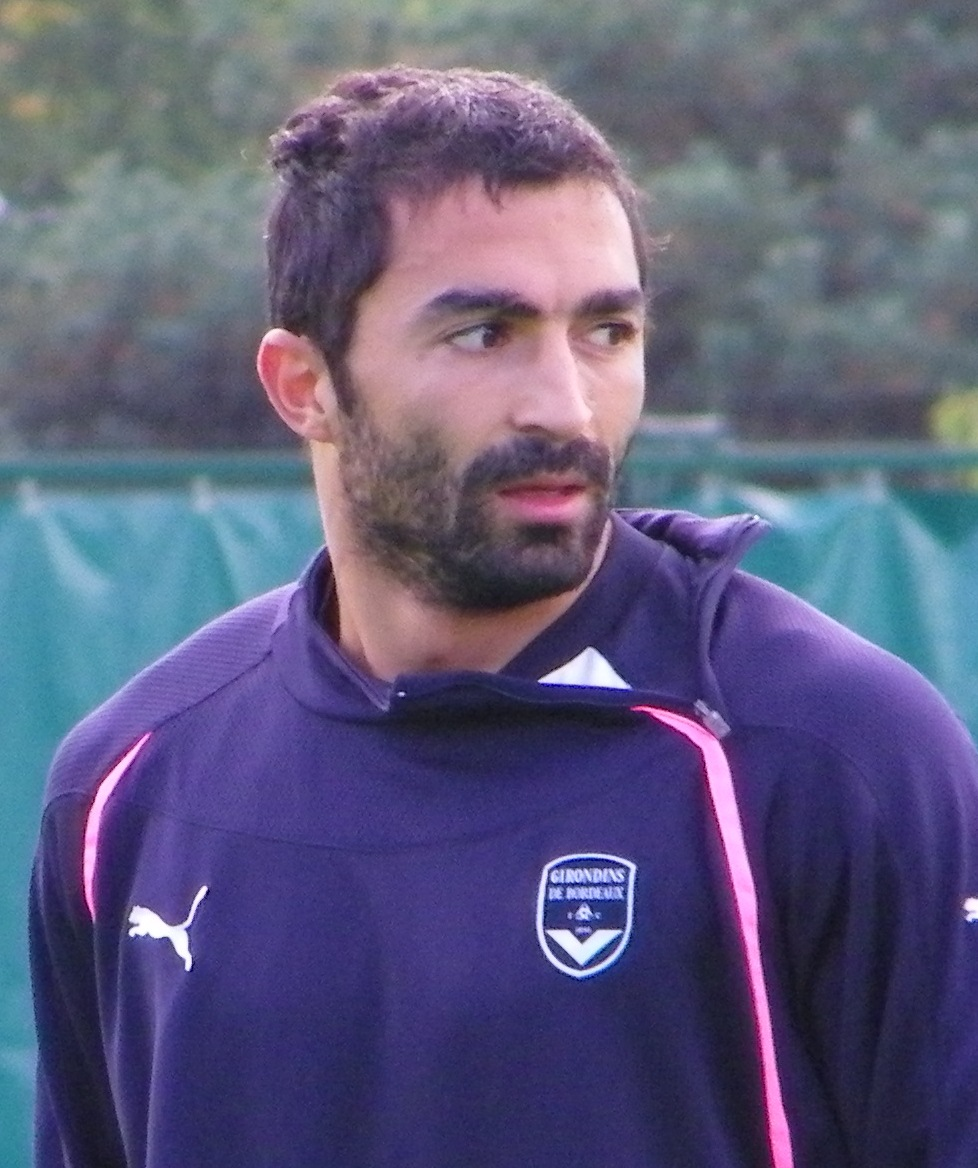
Fahid Ben Khalfallah

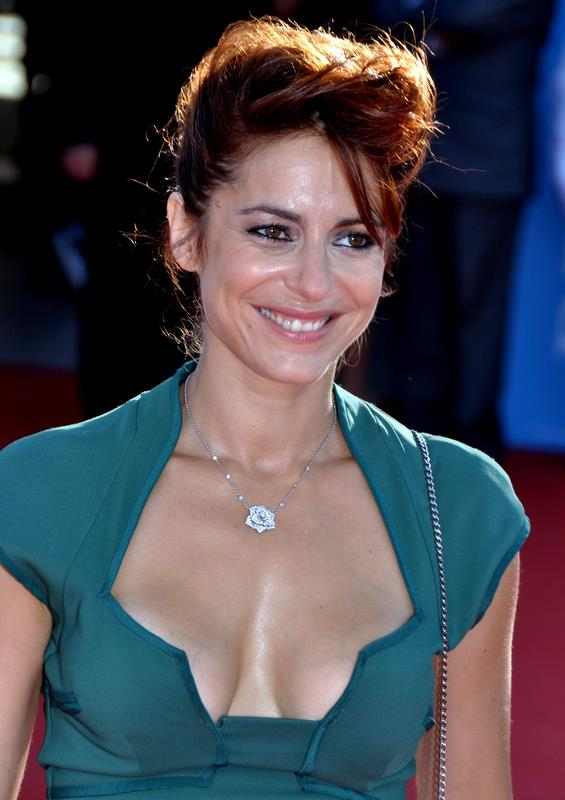
Audrey Dana

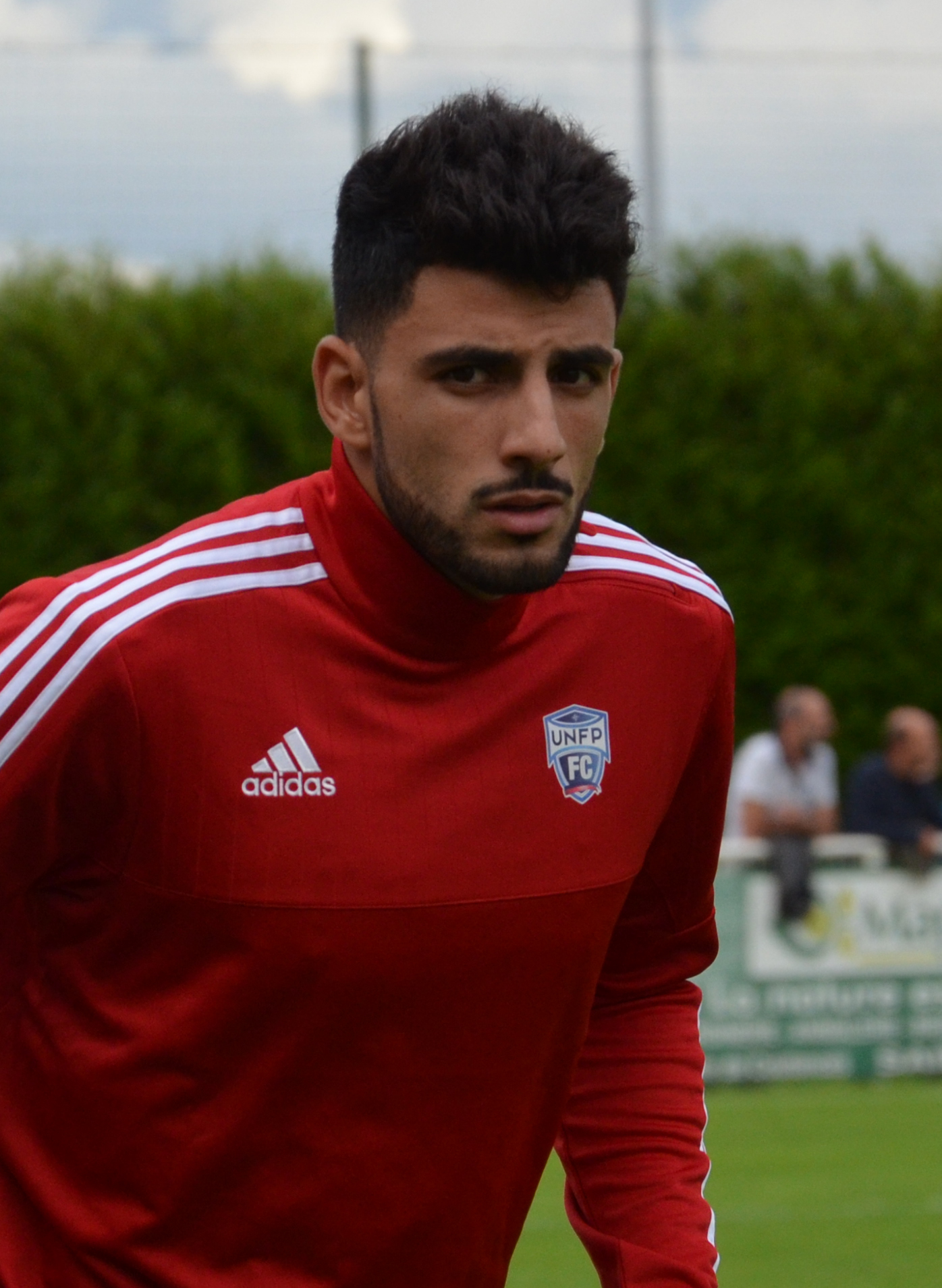
Jonathan Rivas

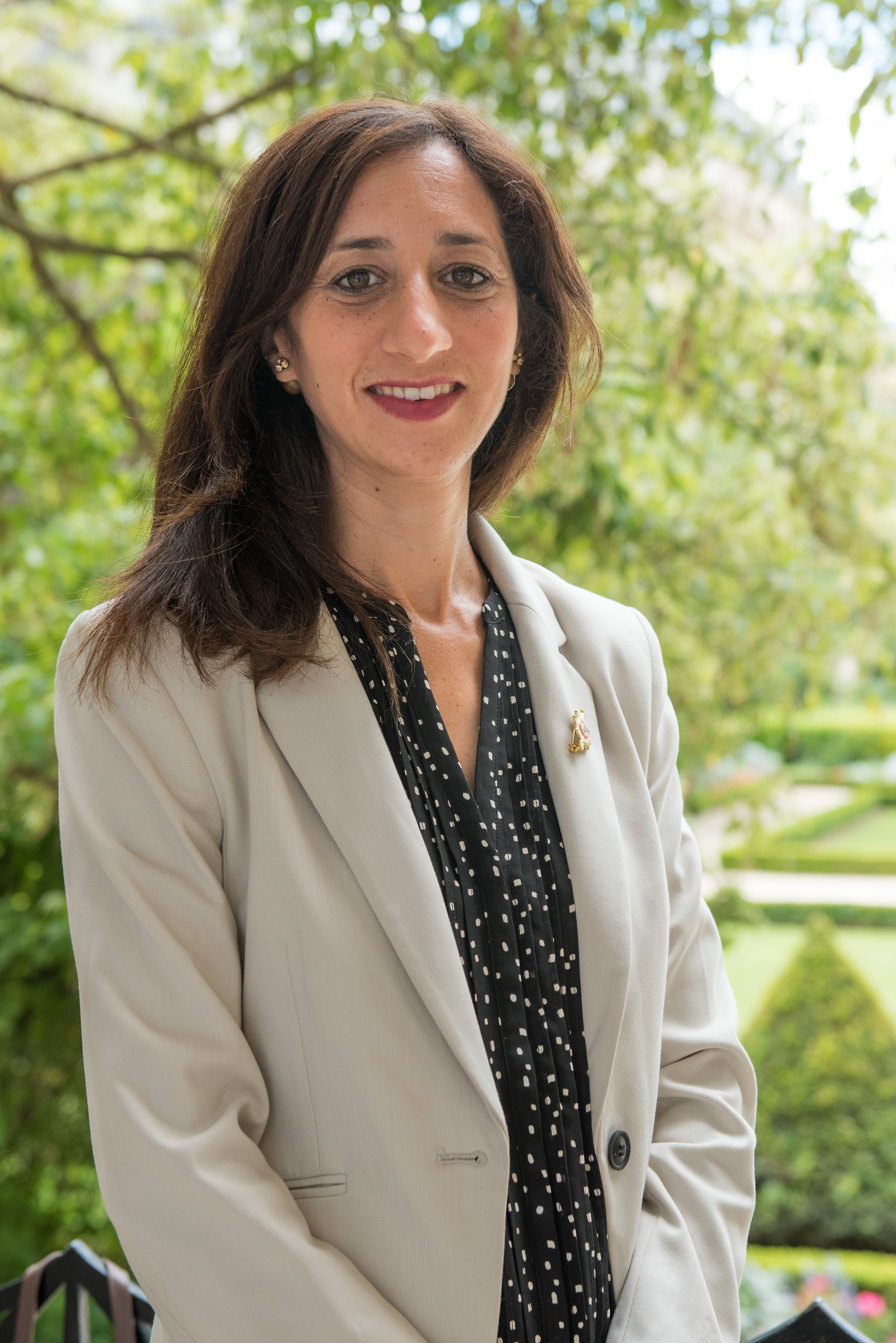
Anissa Khedher

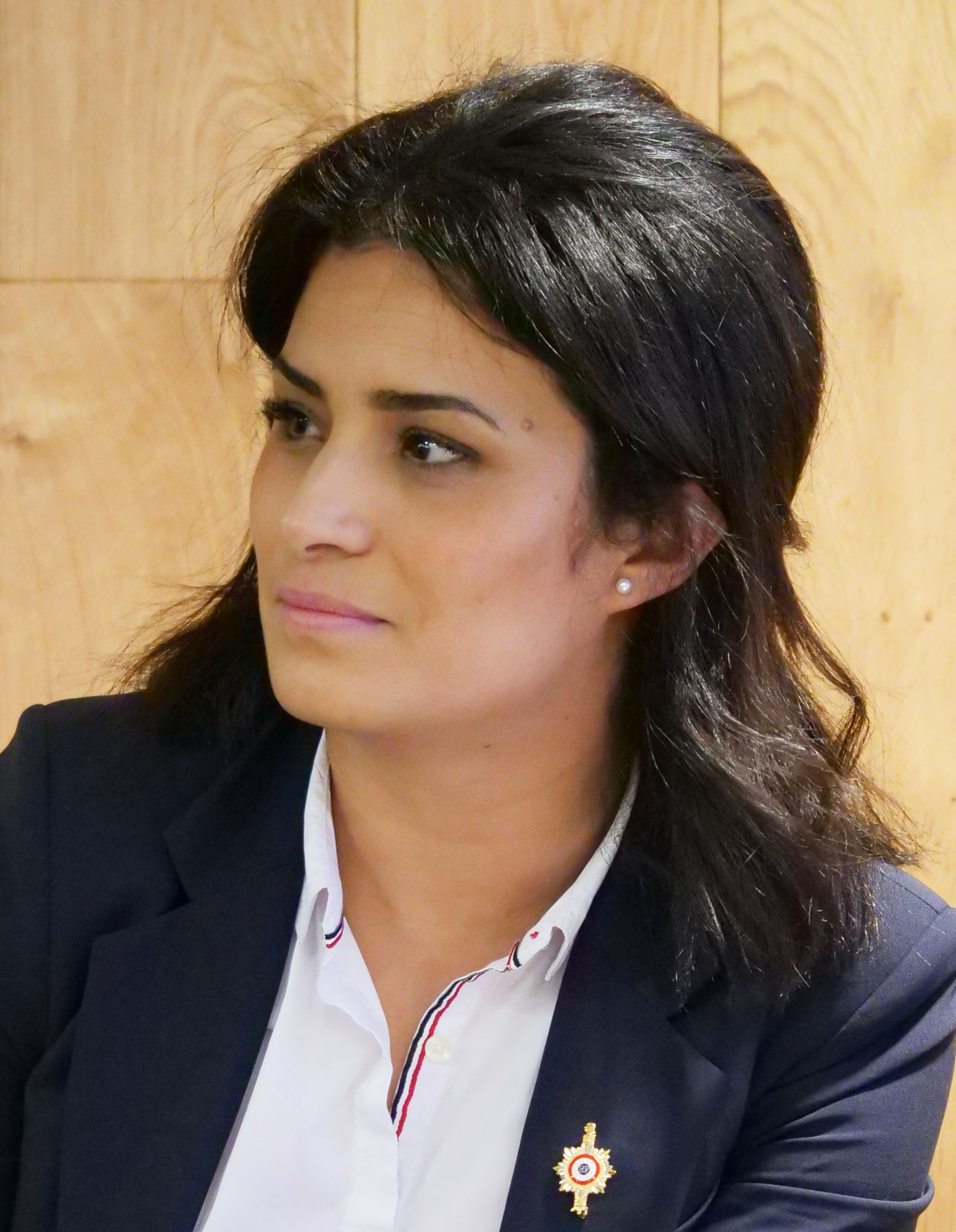
Sonia Krimi

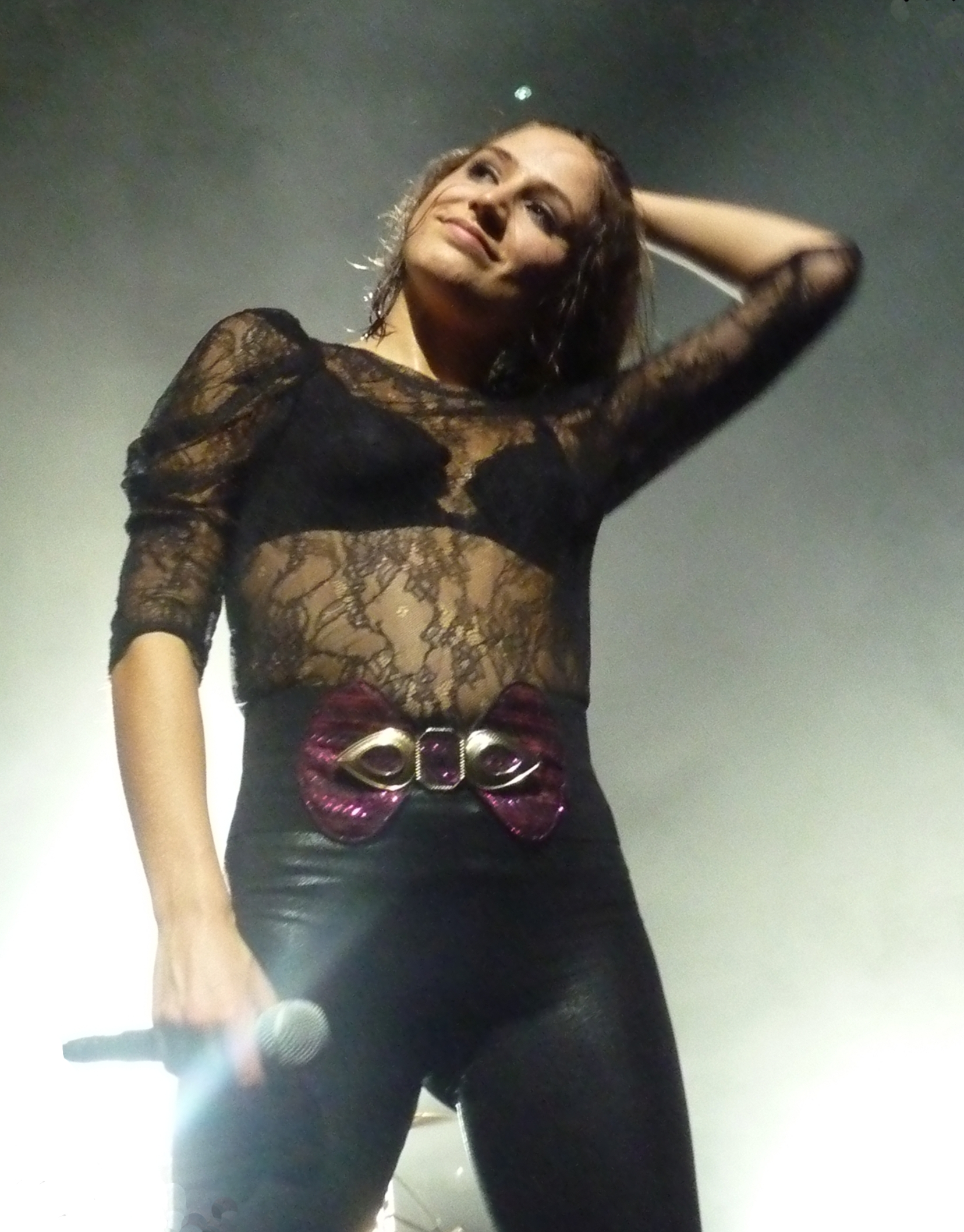
Izïa

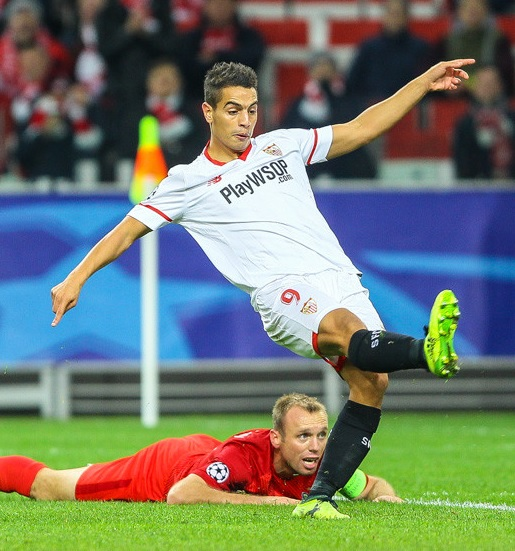
Wissam Ben Yedder

== See also ==
- France–Tunisia relations
- Algerians in France
- Arabs in France
- Berbers in France
- Moroccans in France
- Tunisian diaspora
