= Bakchich (internet) =

French news website

Bakchich was a French news website founded in May 2006.

== Operations ==
It has some articles translated into English. The chief editor was Nicolas Beau, a former reporter at the satirical weekly Le Canard enchaîné. Its name finds its origin in the Arabic word "baksheesh", which means money given to corrupt an official in order to cut down redtape (i.e. a bribe). The newspaper advocated a leftist allegiance.

In 2007, the site's editorial team expanded with the arrival of Nicolas Beau (Le Monde then Le Canard enchaîné), who became managing editor. By early 2008, it had grown to around thirty journalists, cartoonists and columnists.

On November 9, 2009, Bakchich filed for bankruptcy with the Commercial Court, requesting that it be placed in receivership with a continuation plan.

It went into administration in 2011, and the site registration expired in 2016.

== See also ==
- Rue 89, other news website founded in 2007 more centrist.
