= Catherine Graciet =

French journalist

Catherine Graciet is a French journalist known for her work on the finance and geopolitics of the oil business, and for her work on Morocco and its government.

== Biography ==
In January 2004 Graciet and French photographer Nadia Ferroukhi were arrested by the Moroccan government and expelled from the country after traveling to Laayoune to meet supporters of independence for the Western Sahara.

On 13 January 2011, during the Tunisian Revolution, Tunisian president Zine El Abidine Ben Ali lifted Internet censorship, including access to "La régente de Carthage," a book about the president's wife by Nicolas Beau and Catherine Graciet, becoming available via Facebook.

Spain's El País newspaper, issue of 26 February 2012, was banned in Morocco, because it contained excerpts from Graciet's and Laurent's book, entitled "The Predator King: buying up Morocco," which looks at King Mohammed's wealth, which doubled from 2005 to 2012.

According to Aurelian Breeden, writing for The New York Times, Graciet has "established a reputation" as a "fierce critic" of the Moroccan leadership. Per the same source, Graciet was arrested in August 2015 (along with co-author Éric Laurent) for allegedly accepting a bribe to not publish books about the Moroccan leadership ever again. Both authors "do not deny that a financial transaction took place", but that it was either "a trap" or "a private transaction."

On March 15, 2023, Éric Laurent and Catherine Graciet, were sentenced in Paris to a one-year suspended prison sentence and a fine of 10,000 euros..

== Books ==
- le roi prédateur (The Predator King), 2012, with Éric Laurent
- La régente de Carthage, 2009, with Nicholas Beau
