= France–Tunisia relations =

France-Tunisia relations
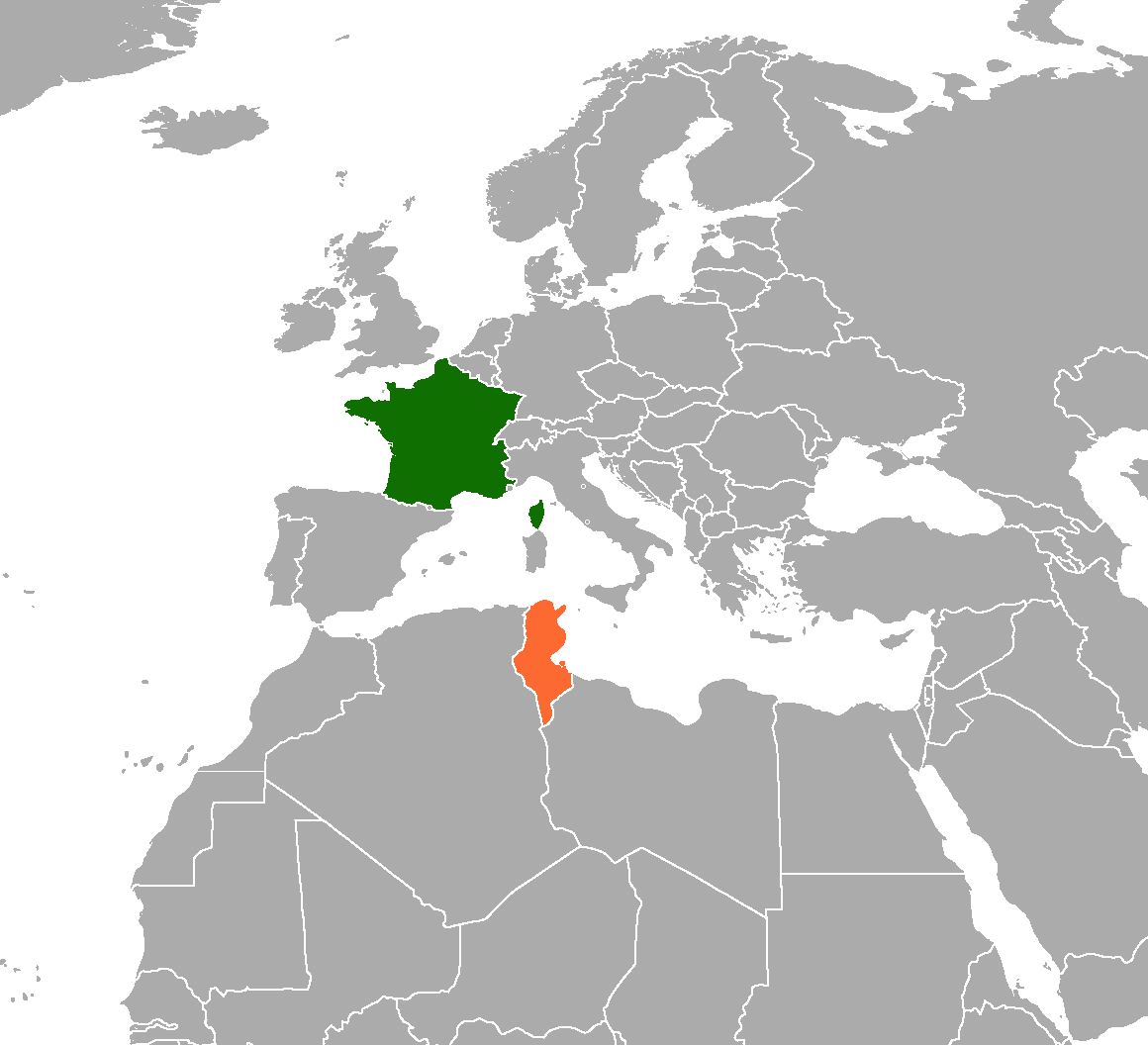
- France: Tunisia

Diplomatic mission
- Embassy of France, Tunis: Embassy of Tunisia, Paris

France–Tunisia relations are the current and historical relations between France and Tunisia. France invaded Tunisia in 1881 and established the French protectorate of Tunisia, which lasted until Tunisia's independence in 1956. In 1957, France cut off financial aid totaling $33.5 million to Tunisia because of its support for neighboring Algeria's independence movements. At the time, Tunisian President Habib Bourguiba noted "France and Tunisia will never again be exclusive partners". From 1987 until the 2011 Tunisian Revolution, France refused to criticize Tunisian President and ally Zine El Abidine Ben Ali, despite the deaths of numerous non-violent protesters. Ben Ali eventually resigned. In October 2023, a demonstration in front of the French embassy in Tunis, condemning the "solidarity" visit of French President Emmanuel Macron to Israel. They demanded the expulsion of the French ambassador to Tunisia, Anne Gueguen, denounced the Emmanuel Macron's visit to Tel Aviv on Tuesday and accused Paris of supporting Israel in its war against the Gaza Strip.

== Resident diplomatic missions ==
- France has an embassy in Tunis.
- Tunisia has an embassy in Paris and consulates-general in Lyon and Marseille and consulates in Grenoble, Nice, Pantin, Strasbourg and Toulouse.

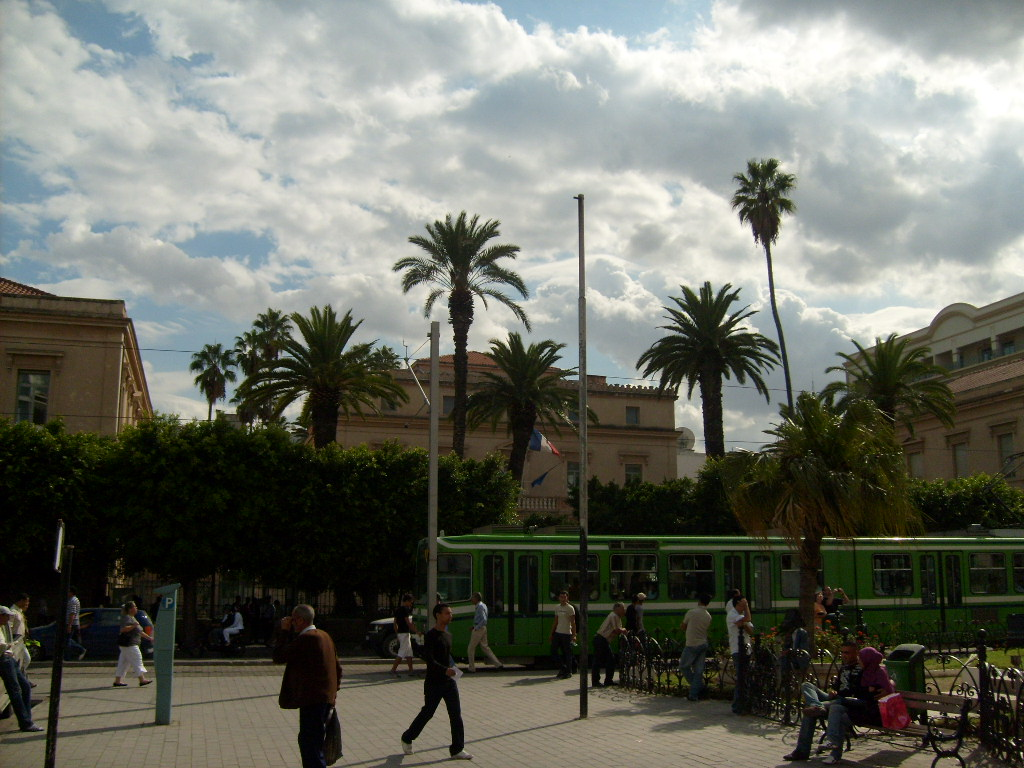
Embassy of France in Tunis

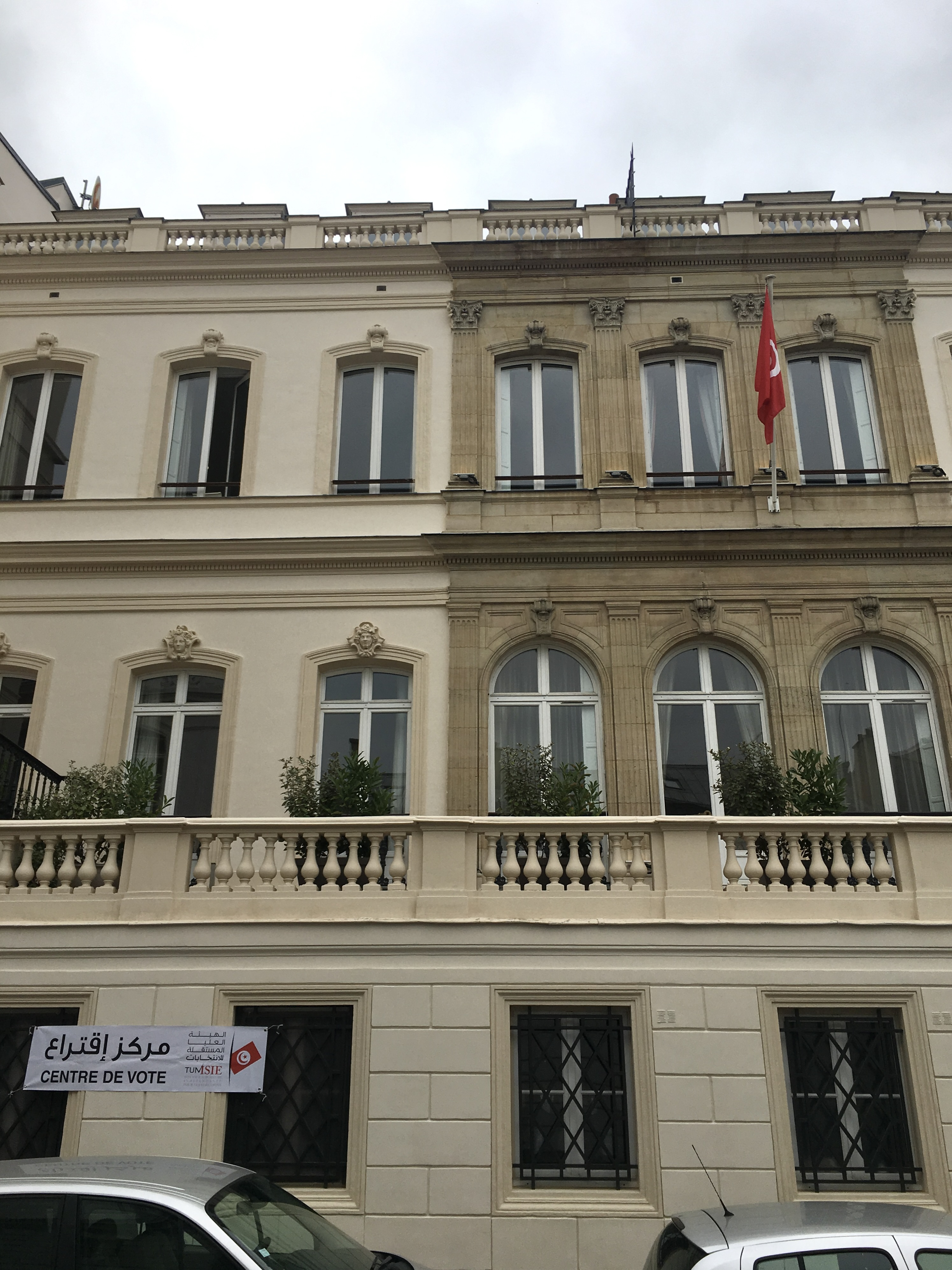
Embassy of Tunisia in Paris

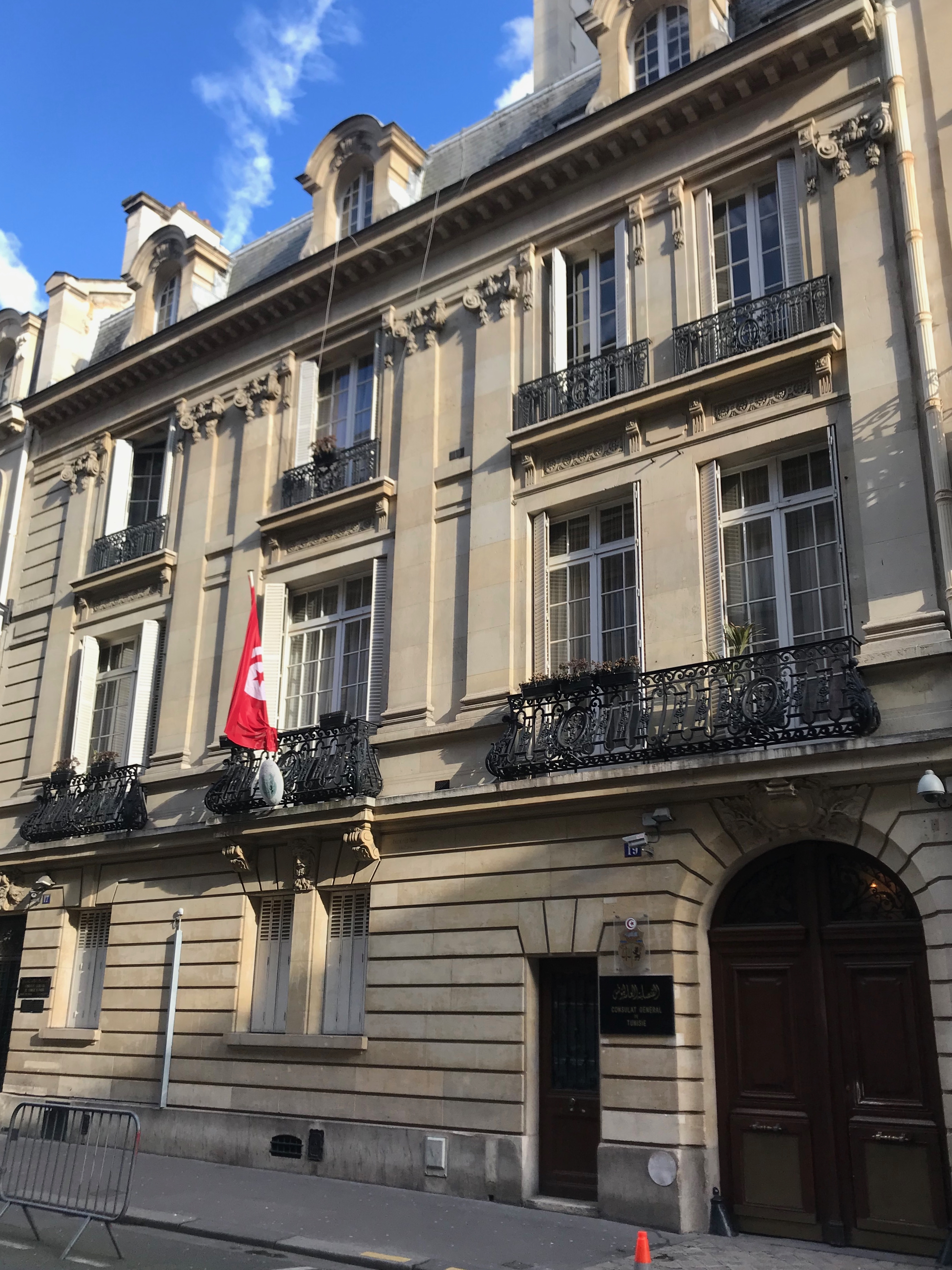
Consulate-General of Tunisia in Paris

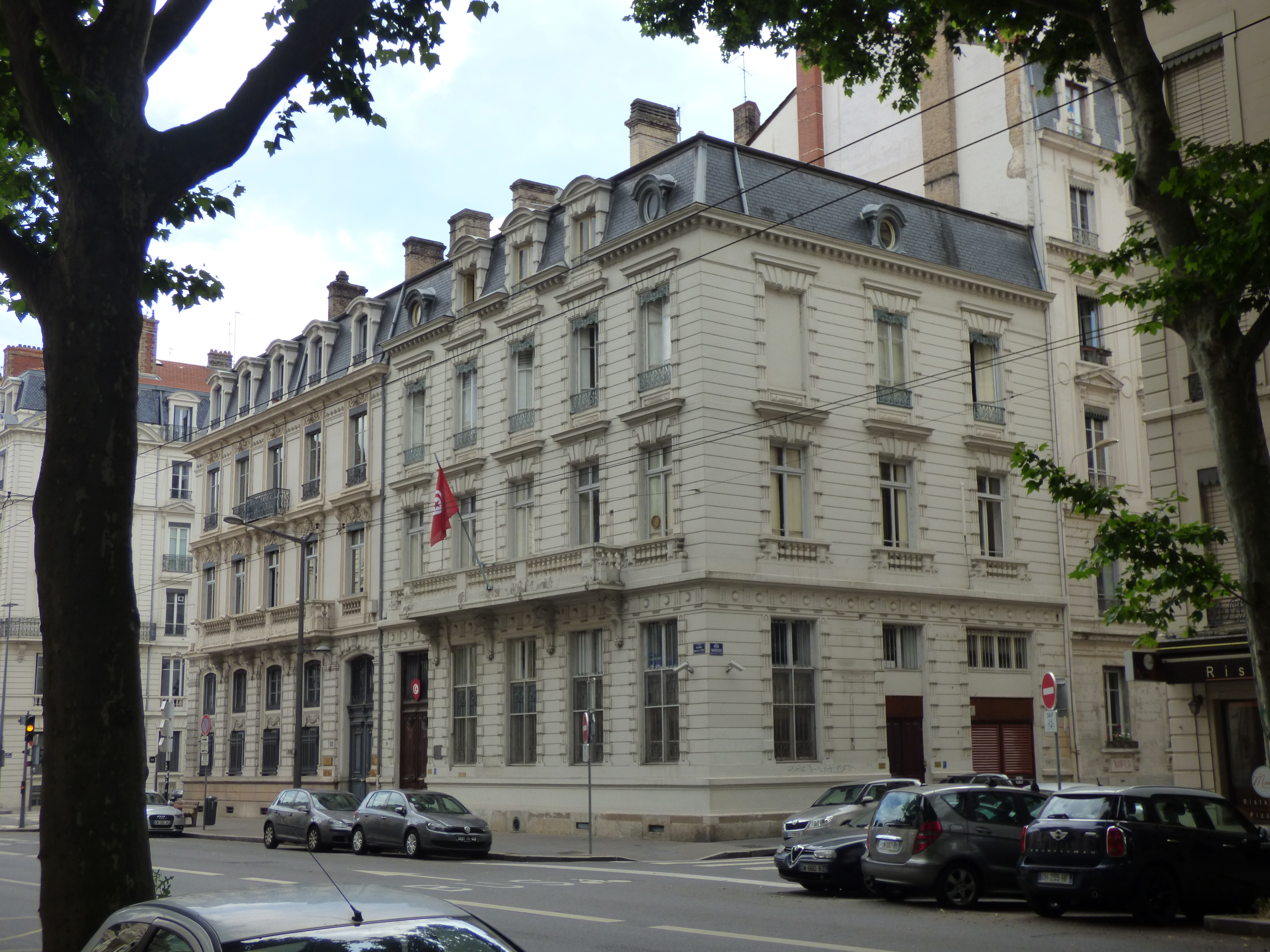
Consulate-General of Tunisia in Lyon

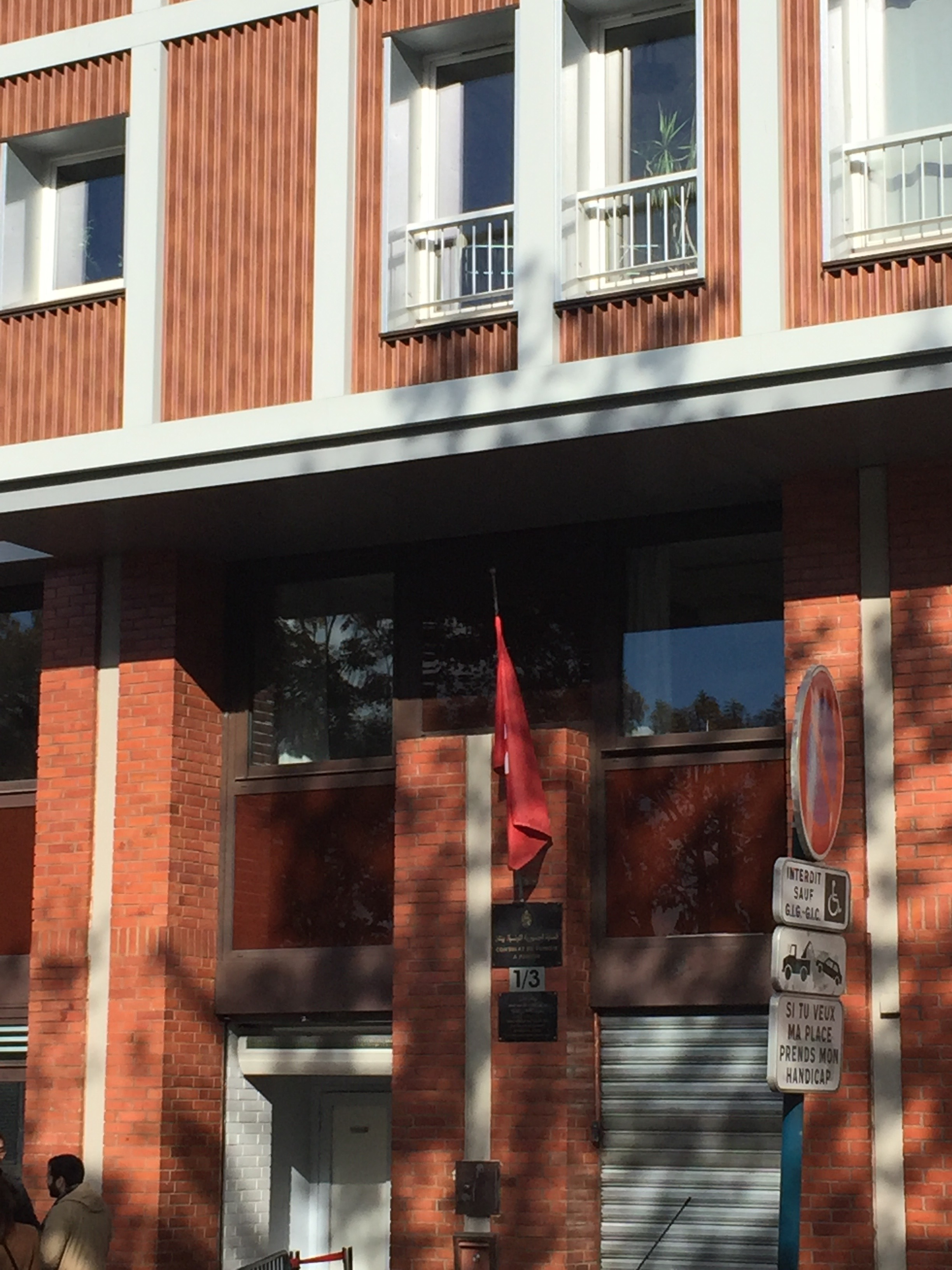
Consulate-General of Tunisia in Pantin

== See also ==
- Foreign relations of France
- Foreign relations of Tunisia
- French conquest of Tunisia
- History of French-era Tunisia
- Tunisians in France
