= Algerians =

People of Algeria

الجزائريون
- Algerian diaspora in the world

Regions with significant populations
- Algeria; 47,400,000
- France: 2,250,000
- Canada: 120,000
- Spain: 70,511
- Germany: 60,000
- United States: 60,000
- United Kingdom: 30,000
- Italy: 19,142
- Turkey: 9,815
- Netherlands: 9,000
- Sweden: 5,048
- Egypt: 3,000
- Mali: 1,000
- Australia: 2,000
- Brazil: 927

Languages
- Algerian Arabic (majority), Berber (minority)

Religion
- Predominantly Sunni Islam; Minority: Ibadi Islam and Judaism

Algerians (Note: Arabic: الجزائريون, romanized: al-Jazāʾiriyyūn, pronounced [al‿dʒaˈzaːʔirijˌjuːn]; Berber languages: ⴰⵣⵣⴰⵢⵔⵉⵢⵏ) are the citizens and nationals of Algeria. The majority of the country's population speaks Algerian Arabic, while Berber languages are spoken by a significant minority, estimated at around 15% of the population. The term also applies more broadly to any people who are of Algerian nationality, sharing a common culture and identity, as well as those who natively speak the languages of Algeria.

In addition to the approximately 46 million residents of Algeria, there is a large Algerian diaspora as part of the wider Arab diaspora. Considerable Algerian populations can be found in France, Belgium, Spain, Italy, and the United Kingdom; with smaller notable concentrations in other Arab states as well as non-Arab countries such as the United States, and Canada.

== Ethnic groups ==
Ethnic groups in Algeria
1. Arabs (73.6%)
2. Berbers (23.2%)
3. Arabized Berbers (3.00%)
4. Others (0.20%)

The majority of the population of Algeria is Arab, constituting between 75% and 80% to 85% of the population. Berbers on the other hand make up between 15% and 20% to 24% of the population. According to Britannica, the country's population is 73.6% Arab, 23.2% Berber, 3% Arabized Berber, and 0.2% other. Centuries of Arab migrations to the Maghreb from the Arabian Peninsula and the Levant since the 7th century Muslim conquest have significantly altered Algeria's demographic landscape, culturally and linguistically. Berbers, Phoenicians, Romans, Byzantines and Turks as well as other ethnic groups have contributed to the culture and languages of the Algerian population.

Descendants of Andalusi refugees are also present in the population of Algiers and other cities. Moreover, Spanish was spoken by these Aragonese and Castilian Morisco descendants deep into the 18th century, and even Catalan was spoken at the same time by Catalan Morisco descendants in the small town of Grish El-Oued.

The Arab population of Algeria is a result of the inflow of sedentary and nomadic Arab tribes from Arabia since the Muslim conquest of the Maghreb in the 7th century with a major wave in the 11th century. The Berbers are divided into many groups with varying languages. The largest of these are the Kabyles, who live in the Kabylia region east of Algiers, the Chaoui of North-East Algeria, the Tuaregs in the southern desert and the Shenwa people of North Algeria.

During the colonial period, there was a large (15% in 1960) European population who became known as Pied-Noirs. They were primarily of French, Spanish and Italian origin. Almost all of this population left during the war of independence or immediately after its end.

== Languages ==
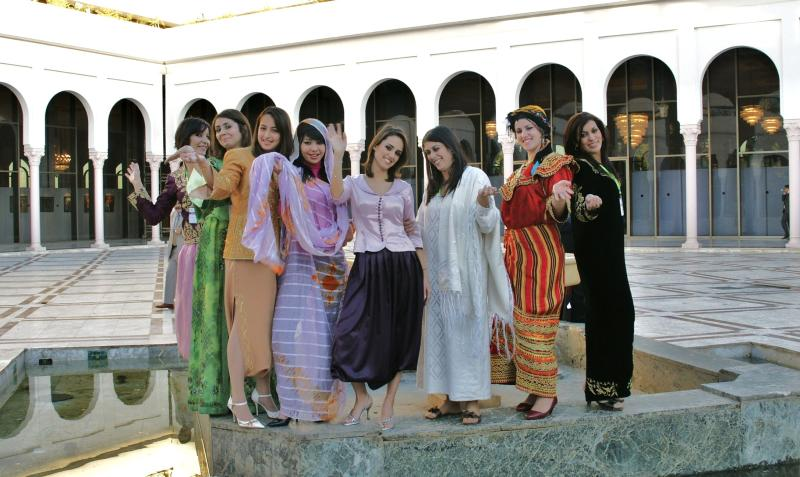
Algerian women in traditional clothes

Modern Standard Arabic and Berber are the official languages of Algeria. The vast majority of Algerians speak Algerian Arabic as their native language, although other Arabic dialects are spoken such as Algerian Saharan Arabic, Hassaniya Arabic, Moroccan Arabic, Egyptian Arabic and Iraqi Arabic. Colloquial Algerian Arabic has some Berber loanwords which represent 8% to 9% of its vocabulary.

Modern Standard Arabic (MSA) is generally reserved for official use and education, while Algerian Arabic is the native dialect of 75% to 80% of Algerians and is mastered by 85% to 100% of them. It is a spoken language used in daily communication and entertainment. As in the rest of the Arab world, this linguistic situation has been described as diglossia: MSA is nobody's first acquired language; it is learned through formal instruction rather than transmission from parent to child.

A minority of Algerians speak one of the various Berber languages. The largest Berber language is Kabyle with 3 million speakers. It has significant Arabic, French, Latin, Greek, Phoenician and Punic substratum, and Arabic loanwords represent 35% to 46% of the total Kabyle vocabulary.

== Religion ==
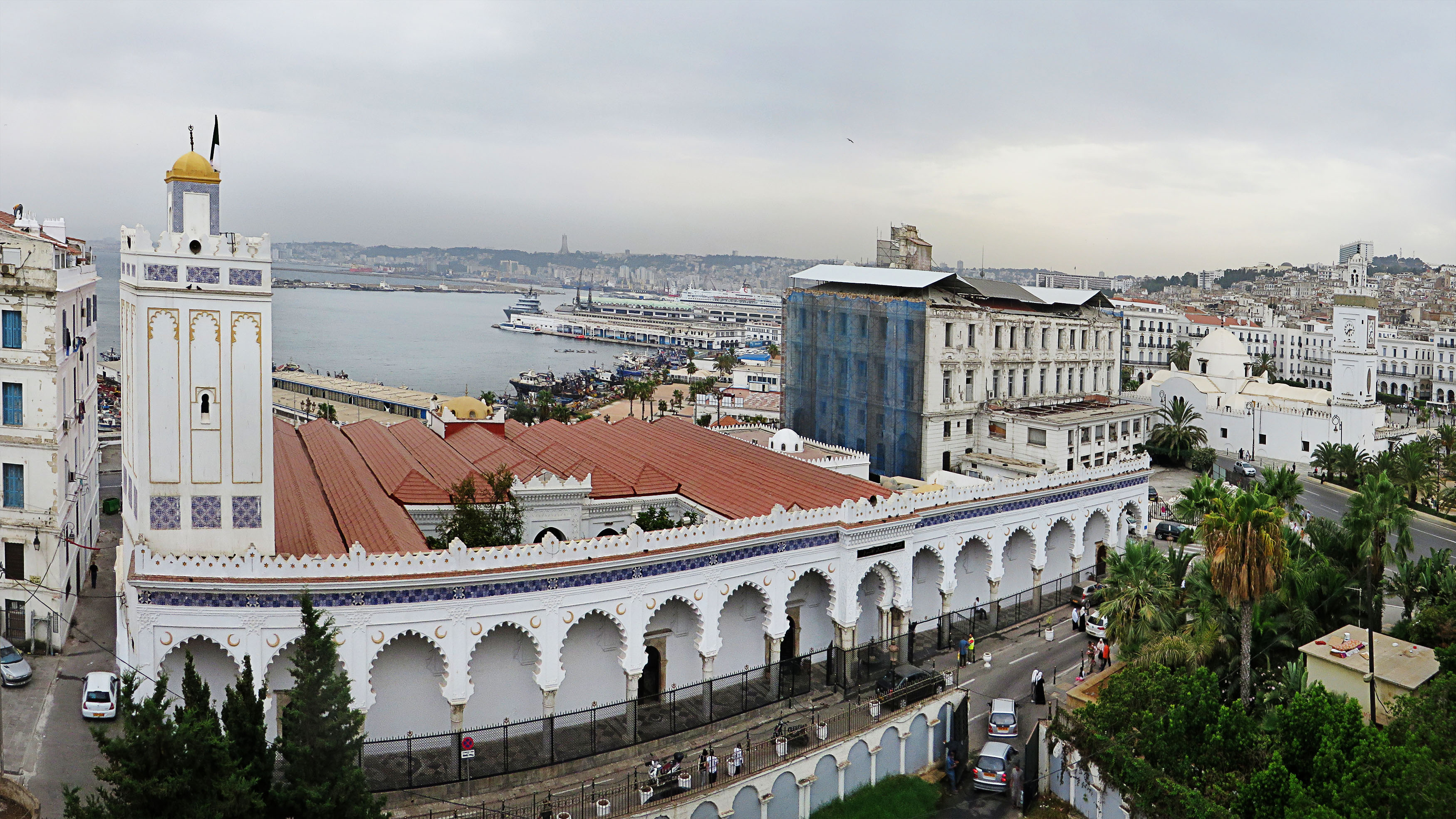
Djamaa el Kebir

Islam is the predominant religion in Algeria, with the vast majority of adherents being Sunni Muslims. The dominant madhhab is Maliki, there are a few followers of the Hanafi rite among people of Turkish descent. According to the 2021 CIA World Factbook, Muslims make up approximately 99% of the population, while Pew Research estimated this figure at 97.9% in 2020. Additionally, there are around 290,000 Ibadis Muslims, primarily residing in the M'zab Valley in the Ghardaia region. Islam was introduced to Algeria by the Umayyad dynasty during the Arab expansion, beginning with the invasion led by Uqba ibn Nafi.

Christianity was introduced to North Africa during the Roman era. Its influence waned during the Vandal invasions but was later reinforced under Byzantine rule. However, indigenous Christianity in North Africa persisted beyond the Muslim conquest until the early 15th century. Before Algeria’s independence, the country was home to more than 1.3 million Christians, most of whom were of European descent, along with a small number of Algerians who had converted to Christianity. Following independence, the majority of these settlers emigrated to France. Since the 1960s, an increasing number of Algerians have converted to Christianity. The number of Algerian converts to Christianity, is estimated to range between 50,000 and 200,000 mostly during Colonial rule. Today, most Christian Algerian citizens belong to Protestant denominations, which have faced growing governmental pressure in recent years, including numerous forced church closures.

Algeria’s Jewish community, with roots dating back to antiquity, was largely composed of descendants of Spanish refugees. Before independence in 1962, about 140,000 Jews lived in Algeria, but most emigrated to France due to their French citizenship. By the 1990s, only around 1,000 remained, with the last synagogue in Algiers vandalized in 1977.
