= Algerian diaspora =

People of Algerian heritage who live outside Algeria

الجالية الجزائرية
- Algerian diaspora in the world (by Country and Canadian Province)

Total population
- c. 1,780,399

Regions with significant populations
- France: 1,405,235 (2024)
- Canada: 96,774 (2024)
- Spain: 83,122 (2024)
- Israel: 53,589 (2024)
- United States: 36,031 (2024)
- Belgium: 30,393 (2024)
- United Kingdom: 29,472 (2021)
- Italy: 21,682 (2024)
- Germany: 21 320 (2017)
- Turkey: 16,719 (2024)
- Portugal: 15,916 (2025)
- Morocco: 15,731 (2024)
- Tunisia: 11,622 (2024)
- Switzerland: 11,016 (2024)
- Netherlands: 9,016 (2022)
- Guinea: 6,542 (2024)
- Senegal: 4,447 (2024)
- Libya: 4,049 (2024)
- Sweden: 3,672 (2024)
- Mauritania: 1,922 (2024)
- Australia: 1,643 (2024)
- Finland: 1,194 (2024)
- Norway: 1,427 (2024)
- Luxembourg: 1,286 (2024)
- Austria: 1,268 (2023)
- Hungary: 1,096 (2024)
- Denmark: 1,053 (2024)

Languages
- Arabic (Algerian Arabic, Algerian Saharan Arabic); Berber (Kabyle, Shawiya, Mozabite)

Religion
- Predominantly Sunni Islam; Minority: Ibadi Islam, Christianity, Judaism

The Algerian diaspora (Arabic: الجالية الجزائرية) comprises the population of Algerian origin or nationality living outside the country, mainly in France but also in the rest of the world. It is largely the result of the high rate of emigration that Algeria has experienced since the end of World War II in 1945, and the freedom granted by the French colonial administration to Algerians to settle in metropolitan France starting from 1947. They are the largest foreign national group represented in France.

During the 1960s and 1970s, the favorable economic situation in France further amplified the phenomenon.

== Demography ==
According to Gilles Pison, in 2000, the total number of Algerian migrants (i.e., individuals born in Algeria and living outside the country) worldwide was estimated to be over 2 million individuals, which accounted for 6.8% of the country's population.

According to Aida, the International Association of the Algerian Diaspora Abroad, established in London in 2012, the number of Algerians or individuals of Algerian origin living abroad in 2012 was estimated to be 6 million.

== Brain drain ==
According to sociologist Hocine Khalfaoui, over 80% of the Algerian diaspora settled in North America (United States and Canada) consists of highly educated individuals. Fateh Ouazzani, president of Reage (Network of Algerians Graduated from French Prestigious Schools and Universities), reported in 2013 that there were between 300,000 and 400,000 Algerian executives and entrepreneurs, or individuals of Algerian origin, in France and Europe.

According to economist Smail Goumeziane, a former Algerian minister of trade, skilled emigration from Algeria extends beyond academia and affects strategic sectors of the economy. He cited media reports of engineers leaving national hydrocarbon and gas companies for multinational firms in the United States and Gulf states, as well as departures from the national airline, Air Algérie, involving pilots, cabin crew, and technical staff. According to Goumeziane, engineers from Algérie Télécom have also declined to return to Algeria after completing training programs in Europe or Asia. He estimated that approximately 500,000 highly trained Algerians, educated largely at public expense, have emigrated. According to analyst Chikhoune, around 800 Algerians are employed in major technology companies in Silicon Valley, many working in research and development roles. Chikhoune further cited a report by French medical authorities indicating that Algerian doctors constitute approximately 25% of foreign physicians working in France, across multiple specialties and regions. He argued that these figures illustrate persistent challenges in retaining skilled professionals.

== See also ==
- Algerians in the United Kingdom
- Algerians in France
- Algerians of the Pacific
- Algerians in Spain
- Algerians in Italy
- Algerians in Canada
- Arab diaspora
- Kabyle diaspora
