= Algerians in France =

Total population
- 1,250,000 (People of Algerian origin); 1,008,000 (Algerian-born people)

Languages
- French and Algerian Arabic (majority); Kabyle Berber, Chaoui Berber (minority)

Religion
- Majority Sunni Islam; Minority Irreligion, Judaism, Christianity

Related ethnic groups
- Moroccans in France; Tunisians in France

Algerians in France (French: Algériens en France; Arabic: جزائريون في فرنسا) are people of Algerian descent or nationality living in France. People of Algerian origin account for a large sector of the total population in France, and are the largest single represented foreign nationality in France. Some immigrated during colonial rule in Algeria starting in the 1920s, and large numbers chose to emigrate to France from the 1960s onwards.

== History ==
In spite of France's colonial rule in Algeria, many Algerians chose to immigrate to France from the 1960s to the present due to political turmoil. Tensions between the countries endure today. A recent attempt to "improve" the situation was the banning the Muslim women from being free to wear the religious attires Burqa and the Hijab in schools by Jacques Chirac. Nicolas Sarkozy furthered his support of the outlawing of conspicuous religious symbols by ridiculing the burqas as a "sign of subservience of women".

=== Pre-immigration culture ===
The colonization of Algeria by Charles X greatly affected the culture of Algeria. A new ideal of individual land ownership and the exclusion of tribal practices from the work sector threatened the Algerian way of life; many revolutionaries rose up against the exploitation though Algeria was not independent until 1962. Two famous academics visited and studied tribal groups in Algeria—Pierre Bourdieu, a theorist in sociology who studied the pseudo-colonized French Algeria and Melville Hilton-Simpson an anthropologist who studied the Shawía in the mountains of Algeria. Bourdieu extensively researched the destruction of Algerian culture under French rule; Algerians were forced into cities to support the economic interests of the French and destroying their old tribal living and working situations. Though some definitely benefitted from the industrialization of the country, many suffered through unemployment and poverty, inciting violent revolutions and wars throughout the 20th century. In his article "Culture, Violence and Art", Hassen Bouabdellah cites Algeria as the prime example of the violence that erupts after a peoples have had their culture forcibly stripped away. Though France had once enslaved them, Algerian citizens chose to migrate to France because they were still very dependent upon France for trade and many people already knew the language.

==== Religion ====
The vast majority of the population in Algeria practices Islam with increasing numbers of Evangelists. Jews who left Algeria following Independence in 1962 also constitute a large number of Algerian migrants to France.

==== Workplace ====
In industrialized cities of Algeria, men and women worked in harsh conditions and for little pay to maximize the profit of colonial rulers. Though most immigrants to France came from urban areas in Algeria, many of those people were pulled away from their original communities in more remote parts of Algeria. In the rural areas where surviving tribes lived, the traditional roles of males and females were quite different from those in the cities. Females were assigned to the informal work tasks of childcare and cooking as Hilton-Simpson noted when the village women prepared his meal. The women made "simple" meals in their homes which are built on the sides of cliffs while males were in charge of specialized tasks, like medicine. Hilton-Simpson found interesting medical practices among the tribes that survived the French colonized Algeria. Among the Shawía, men were typically those who could train to be a healer. Hilton Simpson observed that the doctors of the tribe performed more advanced medical procedures such as surgeries in addition to herbal remedies and some more supernatural practices. However, the surgeries could not be closely studied because French colonialists banned the practice in the 1800s. Bans ultimately resulted in medicine becoming a very secretive ritual.

==== Marital Practices ====
The legal age for marriage is eighteen for women, twenty-one for men.[5] Many Algerian women are getting married and starting families at much older ages than they did under French Rule. Education, work commitment, and changing social attitudes are the reasons for the change.

In 2010, the total fertility rate was 1.76 children born/woman. This is a drop from 2.41 in 2009 and 7.12 in the 1970s just after the Algerian War of Independence from France

==== Civil War ====
Shortly after gaining independence from France, Algeria began to experience serious political turmoil, eventually leading to the civil war of the 1990s that caused many Algerians to leave the country. On 4 January 1992, the military took over the Algerian government, putting Mohammed Boudiaf in place shortly afterward. On 29 June 1992, Mohammed Boudiaf was assassinated by a bodyguard with supposed Islamist ties—this incited much more violence and the formation of the Armed Islamic Group. Many changes in power occur and violence from many groups, especially the Armed Islamic Group and the Berbers, continues today. The power struggle between these two groups is the root of the upheaval in Algeria that caused these women immigrants to give up their old way of life in search of a better one in France.

== Emigration to France ==
The impact that the Arabs left on Algerian culture was large and has not yet left the minds of the people. Islam gave hope to many poorer women in the countryside, leaving a deep-seated belief in Islam that was carried to France. It is mainly this clash of religious values, rituals and even rumors that has caused a cultural conflict in France.

The migratory movement of Maghrebis into France is generally attributed to push factors. There was little opportunity to move freely throughout society in Algeria, so many were motivated to migrate to France for a better life. The presence of a post-colonial economic opportunity gap when Algeria was freed after the Algerian War also contributed to the increase of Algerian immigrants. Additionally, some Maghrebis migrated to France because they would have more political freedom to protest French suppression in Algeria than they would in their home country.

=== History of the emigration to France ===
The migration of Algerians to France happened in multiple waves: from 1913–1921, from 1922–1939, and from 1940–1954. During the years of 1947–1953, specifically, France saw a large influx of Maghrebi immigrants. Legal Algerian immigrants numbered 740,000 between these years.

In the 1950s, the French government began encouraging Algerian migration, as a result of pressure from businesses. This pressure was partly caused by the lack of workers in post-WWII France . In December 1958, they instituted the Social Action Fund, which supported African immigrants by allocating 500 million Francs towards Maghrebi immigrant shelters and housing. However, the situation these immigrants were in was still unpleasant as a result of their employers, who took them as indentured servants. Thus, they were paid low wages and given little government aid compared to other workers. Ultimately, many of them were deported back to Africa. However, by the late 1950s, France's intake of Algerian migrants began to outnumber those being deported, resulting in a sharp uptick in the French Algerian population.

In the 1960s, Algerians continued to attempt to immigrate to France. Many of these people obtained three month work visas, reflecting their intent to work in France for a short time period before returning home. However, the French government viewed this is as a hostile move, assuming that these immigrants intended to stay in the country permanently. Thus, the government continued to regularly deport Algerians. They were required to have a French address to remain in the country, which most Algerian immigrants did have. However, officials simply didn't believe the authenticity of their identification and paperwork; thus, in the 1960s, the French government deported 5–8% of African immigrants. By 1968, there were 40,000 Africans in France.

== Effects of the emigration to France ==
=== Franco-Algerian culture ===
First generation Algerian immigrants generally moved to France to make a better life for themselves and for their families if they had the proper resources. Médine, a Franco-Algerian rapper, wrote an article detailing his experience and that of his parents as Algerian immigrants. Médine's parents spent most of their time in France working to be completely assimilated into French culture. If they were identified as immigrants, they were berated with racist remarks, and were subjected to repeated identification checks by police. Many journalists and researchers have reported a strong sense of "homogenous national French identity" that many citizens are afraid will disappear with the influx of immigrants from Algeria and other North African countries; there have also been numerous terrorist attacks in France that have inspired a sense of fear towards Islam.

The bigotry from French natives and alleged decreased rights under Islamic tradition were the least of poorer women's worries. These women both receive pressure to assimilate as well as endure increasing misogynist violence in the projects of France according to Fadéla Amara, a civil rights activist France created a welfare program that targeted women and children who recently emigrated to France; the target of this program was to help women get on their feet so that they would embrace French culture instead of calling for Algerian independence. These services gave women the chance to move out of bidonvilles, or shantytowns on the outskirts of the city; however, this was at the expense of giving up their cultural identity for a more Western life which to some was too great of a price.

==== Religion ====
According to a 2023 report, the 2020 INED-INSEE surveys have stated, 91 percent of those who grew up in Muslim families claim the religion of their parents. According to the national survey of 2020 holden by the INSEE, 64% of the French of Algerian origin who were surveyed adhered to Islam; at the same time, 4% of the French of Algerian origin adhered to Christianity, of whom 3% were Catholics and 1% other Christians (without further specification). 32% of the French of Algerian origin declared that they had no religion. According to the same survey 89% of Algerian-born people in France adhered to Islam.

The overwhelming majority of Franco-Algerian immigrants are Muslim, as are the majority of native Algerians. Again, the culture and practice of Islam seems to be most serious issue with immigrants today after the terrorist attacks in France made by Islamic extremists—such as the 1995 public transportation bombing. After these events, 66 percent of French citizens reported that they felt "too many Arabs" were in France and 64 percent felt that the immigration of peoples from Algeria and other countries were a threat to the French identity. Though this feeling of resentment has somewhat decreased, for Muslim women it is still exceedingly difficult to blend Islamic and Algerian culture with French culture. It is still a social and political issue in France today whether Muslim women should be allowed to practice group prayer, wear head scarves and participate in other specifically Muslim practices that may or may not be dangerous to their rights as women

==== Marital practices ====
The Algerian practices of marriage in France are still mostly monogamous and heterosexual though some instances of polygamy still exist; not much has changed since emigrating to France. Therein lies the cause of the political and social upheaval between France and its Algerian immigrants.

However, much of the French population believes that Islam and Algerian culture has led to this violence in marriages. Thus, the "deterritorialized culture wars", a term Paul A. Silverstein coined, are a pressing issue in France today. Women are strictly forbidden from exogamy and must still be tolerant of polygamy in some cases; the women who emigrate usually come to join their husbands and are still expected to obey men and tradition

==== Art in France ====
In Paris, Algerian immigrants have used graffiti as an outlet for frustration and to voice their political views. The graffiti expresses the feeling of being an outsider-- "La France aux français; l'étrangeté aux étrangers" or France for the French; foreign lands for foreigners. Though some of the graffiti may have been done by women, it is impossible to tell because graffiti artist remain anonymous.

Many of Algeria's artists immigrated to France during the Algerian Civil war. Art in exile has become very popular among the women immigrants in France; it expresses the loss of their country and helps exercise their newly gained freedoms. Many painters, writers and actors had to emigrate as well during the violent period of the 1990s creating a large presence in France.

=== Cultural conflicts ===
In order to preserve French culture, there is little to no consideration of multiculturalism. In the movie They Call Me Muslim, the young women interviewed expressed their concern over the issue saying that wearing the Hijab is a choice that brings them closer to God. However, the editor of Le Monde diplomatique also said in the video that women receive pressure from males to wear the Hijab. Currently, 49% of Muslim women favor the ban.

Cultural conflicts are a more difficult area to explore in the lives of Franco-Algerian women. Many have reported a generally unwelcome atmosphere if they stand out from regular French culture. The young women in They Call Me Muslim reported running during lunch time to attend afternoon prayer at a mosque because such practices are not allowed in French schools. The French public will have to either accept the idea of multiculturalism or keep the Algerian women from their old way of life, into accepting fully the French culture.

=== Legal conflicts ===
In France's constitution, there is a clause named Laïcité which denotes the separation of church and state. Many Muslims who would like to wear the Hijab of their choosing cite this part of the Constitution. On the other hand, Laïcité also could be used to prohibit the display and practice of religion in schools, making daily prayer and the Hijab constitutionally unacceptable. The French are afraid not only of the destruction of their culture, but of the destruction of women's rights. Muslim women's views on the issue range widely depending on the cultural context. While women in Britain say that the hijab frees them from the predatory gazes of men; in France women are angry that they do not get to choose to wear the Hijab, while women in Iran have expressed that it is a symbol of male governmental oppression. There eventually was a law passed by the French National Party and Nicolas Sarkozy making it illegal to wear a Hijab or any other conspicuous religious symbol (such as a large crucifix) in French schools.

In addition, there are conflicts in schools over Muslim girls' participation in mandatory Physical Education courses that require swimsuits or other clothing deemed unacceptable by the Muslim community. Teachers complain that their classes have been disrupted by such complaints and there is no protocol for dealing with the situation. After 50 or more years of large numbers of Algerian immigrants, the cross cultural differences still have not been reconciled.

== Racism ==
In the 1950s, the French government used racism as a tool to delegitimize the efforts of African Nationalist groups. The government used tensions between different groups to depict Algerian immigrants as barbaric in propaganda campaigns. This was massively effective, negatively affecting public opinion on African immigrants. The 1953 survey by the National Institute of Demographic Studies showed that North Africans and Germans were ranked last in sympathy levels for immigrants. This impact is exemplified by a piece published by the L'Aurore, a French periodical, in which it was written:

"In Paris, North Africans are specialists and record makers in the nocturnal attack. The Arab is, quite precisely, the thief who waits on the corner of the road for the late passerby, whom he clubs for the sake of a watch..."

– L'Aurore, 1954

In the 1960s, this sort of racial propaganda continued with the help of public health institutes. They targeted Algerian immigrants along with other African immigrants from Mauritius, Mali and other countries. A study, published in 1963, entitled "Black workers in the Parisian region" (Les travailleurs noirs dans la region parisienne), outlined reasons for why, for public health reasons, African immigrants were not beneficial for France:

"They are accustomed to wearing practically nothing in Africa where the temperature ranges from 90 to 100 degrees, and when they arrive in Paris, especially during the cold winter, they are highly prone to catching disease like tuberculosis".

This report also cited Africans' perceived diets as reason to reject them as workers. These public health officials were under the impression that Africans ate only simple foods such as rice and beans, and therefore, could not survive the heavy workload required of them in France. In reality, Africans ate a variety of healthy food and balanced meals. This report further argued that these food deficiencies meant Africans were ridden with disease. Thus, African immigrants in France were required to carry around passbooks with detailed medical information, and were often randomly stopped and checked by French officials.

This type of racial bias showed a resurgence in the late 1980s and early 1990s with the French political party, the National Front. Jean-Marie Le Pen, the leader of the National Front, led with the slogan "Two million immigrants, two million unemployed". Le Pen is also quoted as saying, "Yes, I believe in racial inequality ... they do not all have the same capacity to evolve". During this time, books with black children featured on the covers were banned. As the 1990s progressed, the National Front's influence grew. The group took political control of the French city of Toulon, and promised to deny housing to African immigrants living in the city.

== Demographics ==
The 2023 Census recorded 892,000 Algerian-born people.

Year	Algerian-born (+naturalized)	Immigrants	Descendants	Other data
1968		378,000		
1990		556,000		
1999		418,884		475,000
2005			624,000	
2006	691,816			
2007	703,000			475,000
2008	713,000			
2009	722,000			
2010	730,000			
2011	737,000		1,001,000	2,500,000
2012	748,000			
2013	760,000			
2014	774,000			
2015	791,000			
2016	808,000			3,500,000
2017	824,000			
2018	839,000			
2019	849,000			
2020	873,000			
2021	876,000	887,000	1,118,000	
2022	879,000			
2023	892,000			
2024				

== Notable people ==
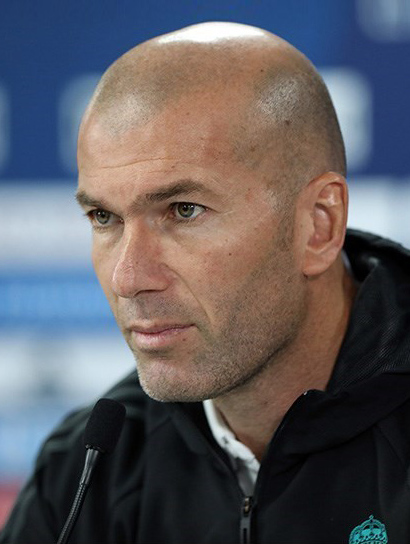
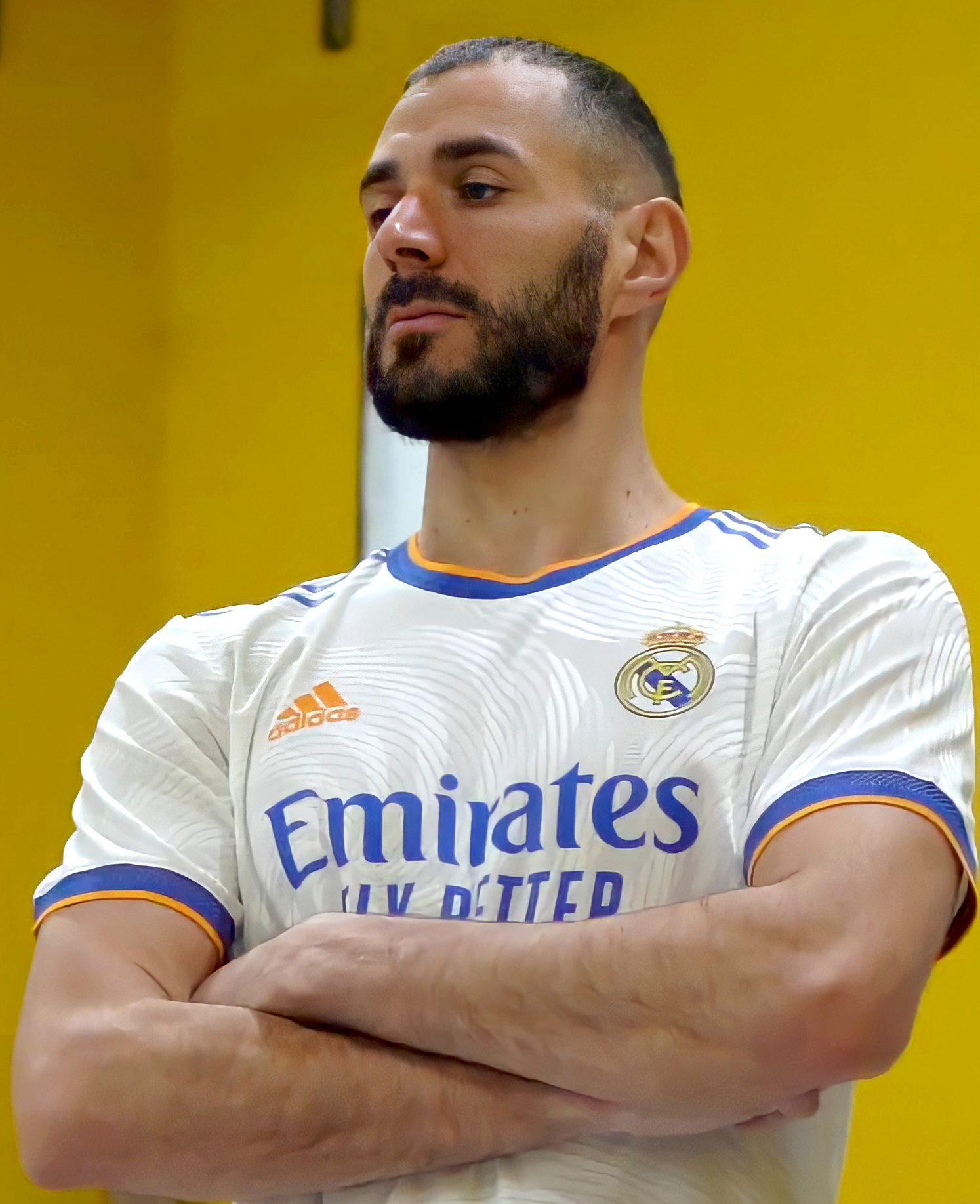
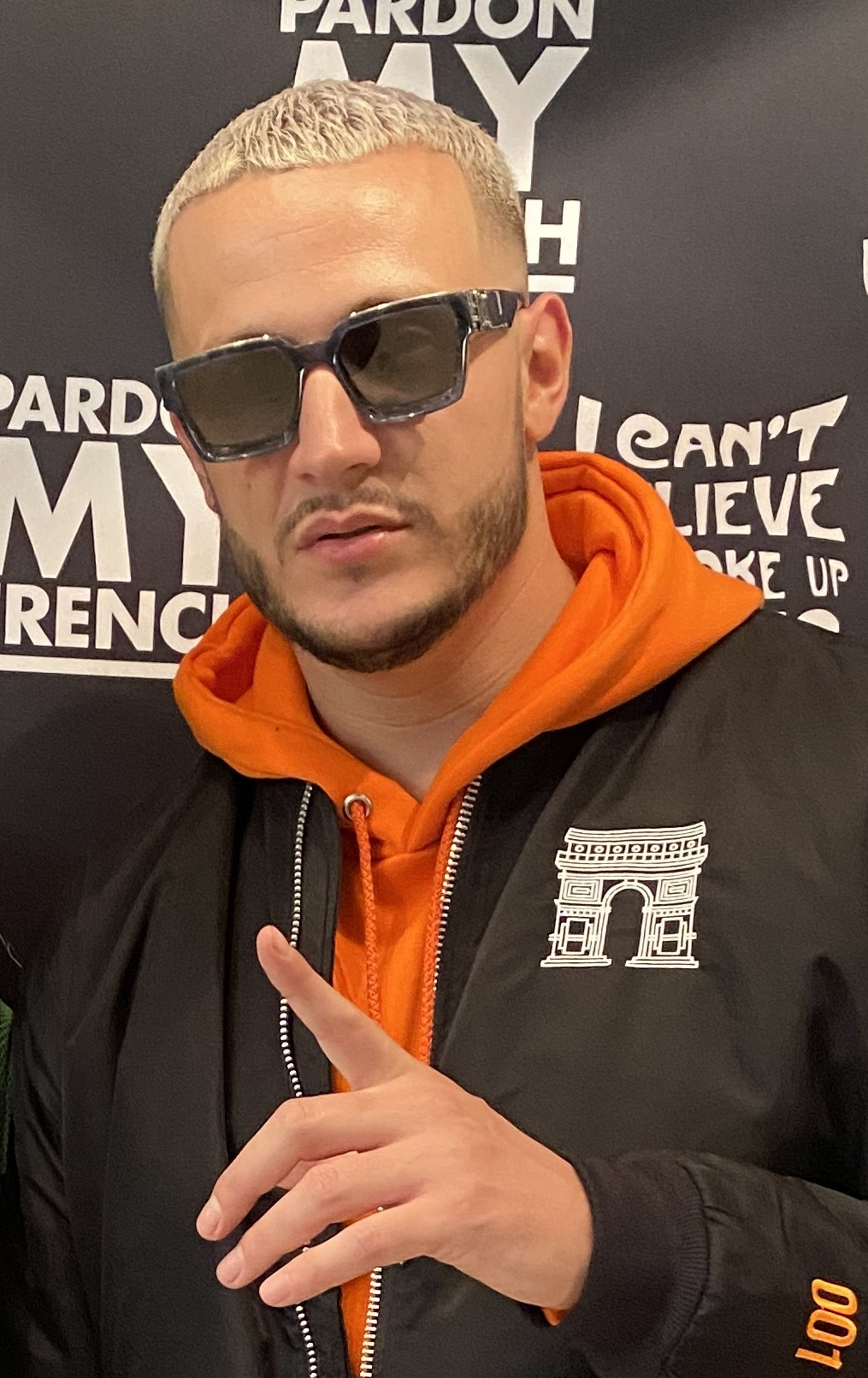
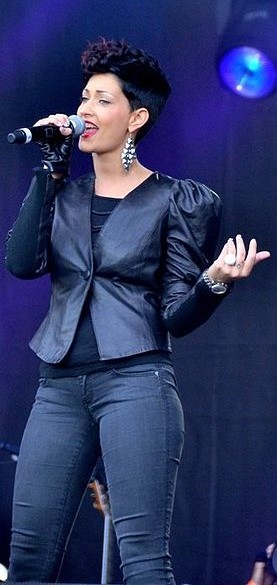
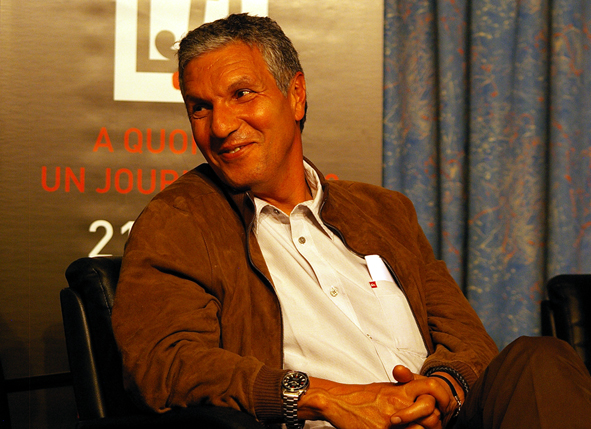
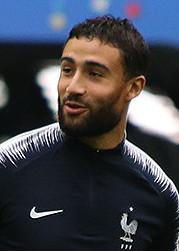
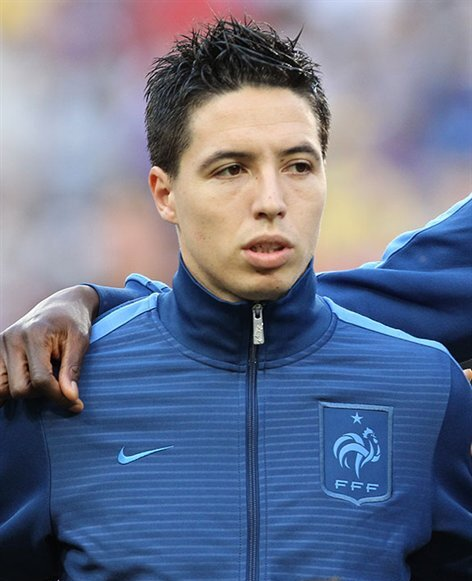
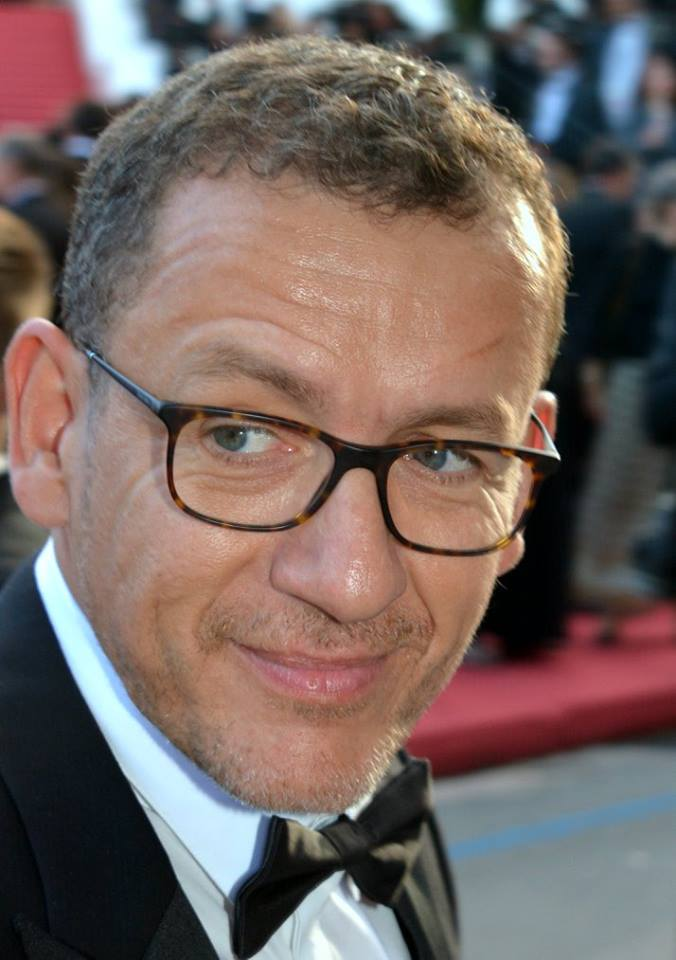
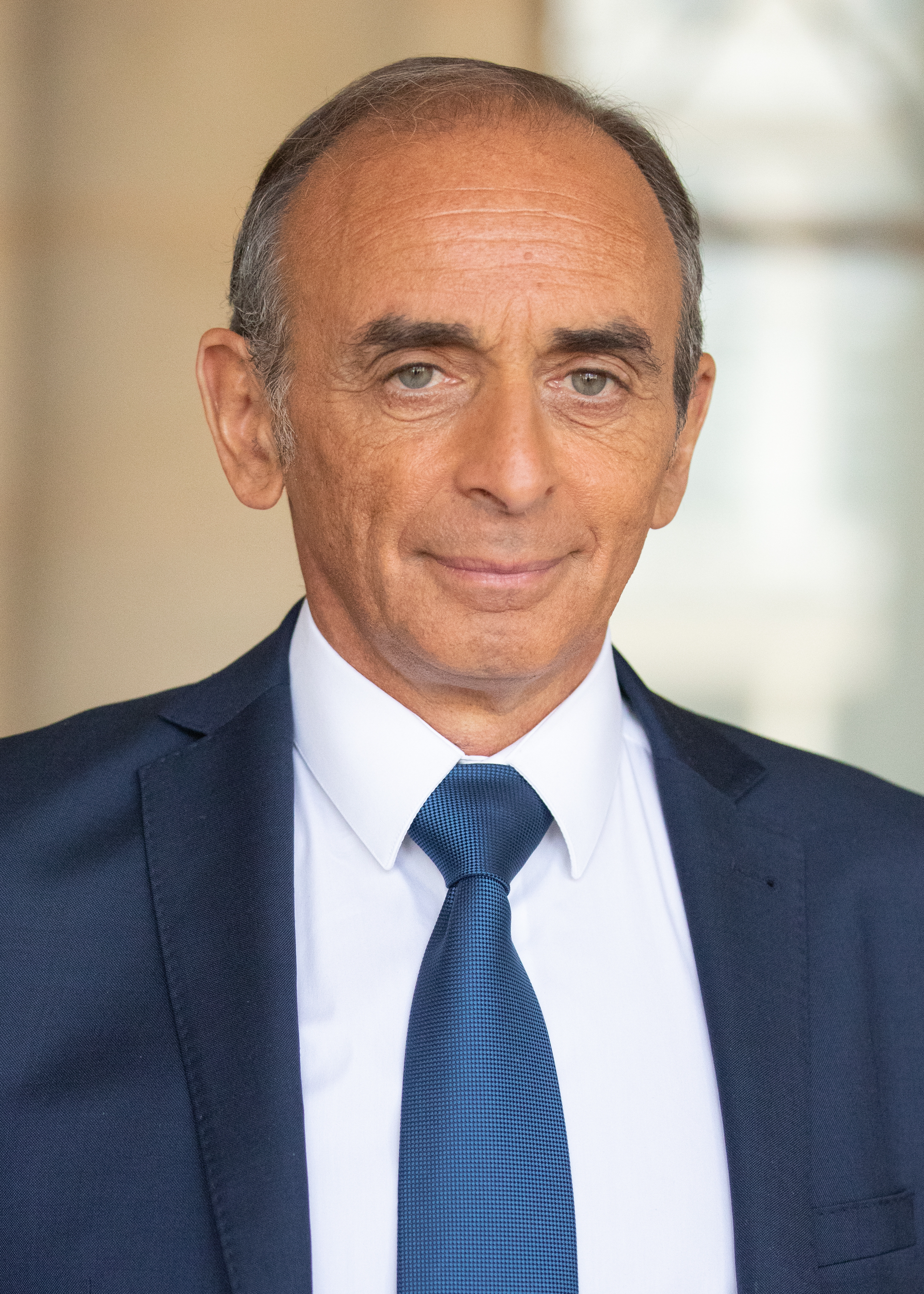
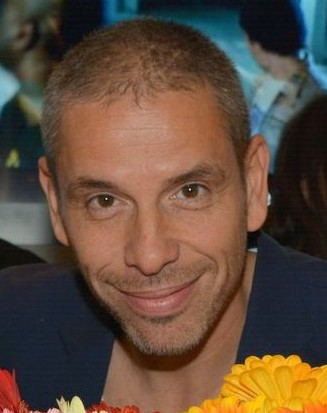
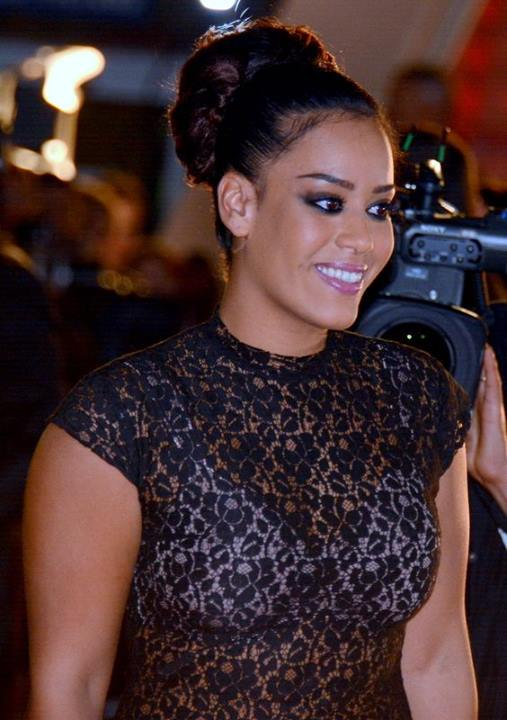
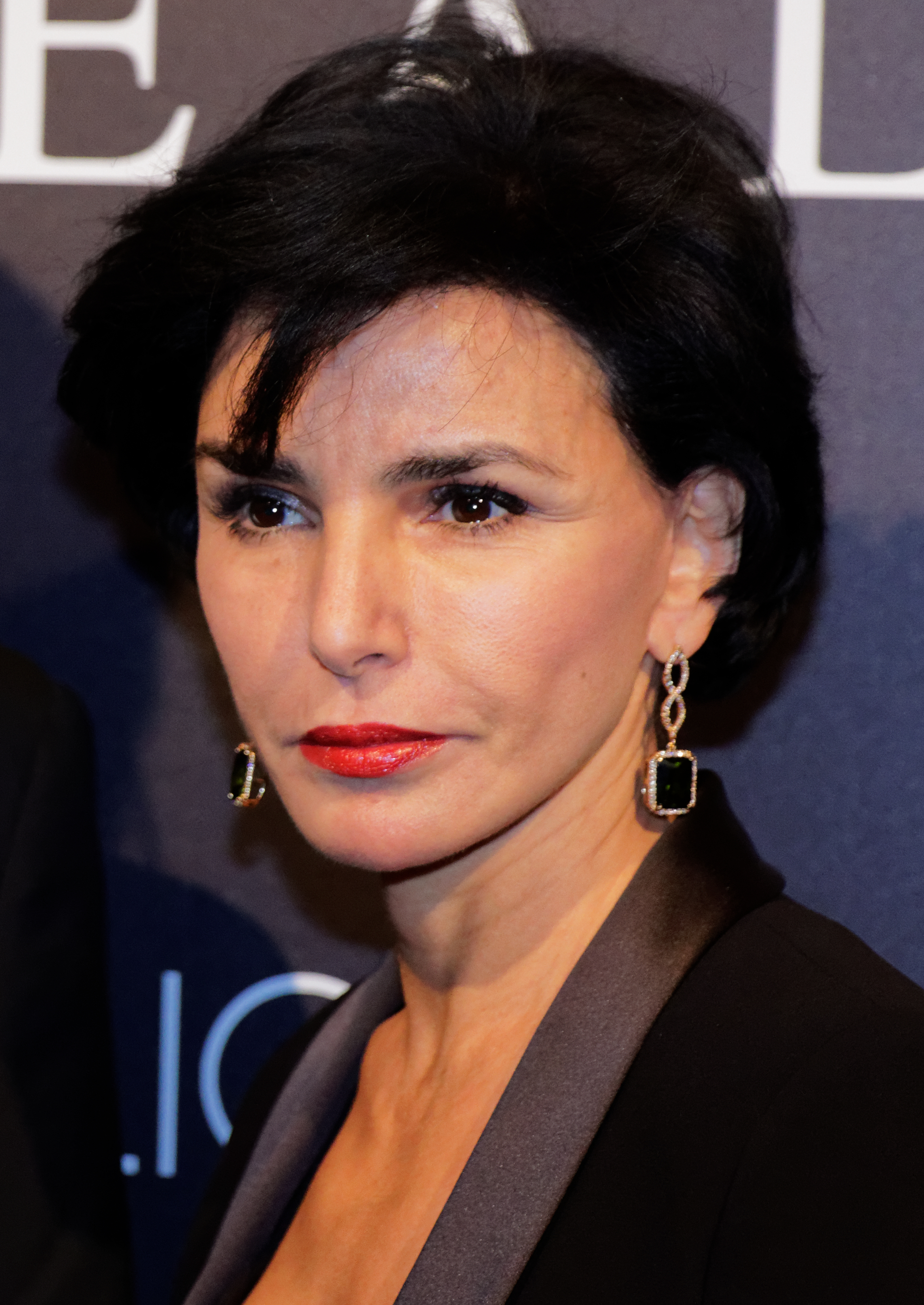
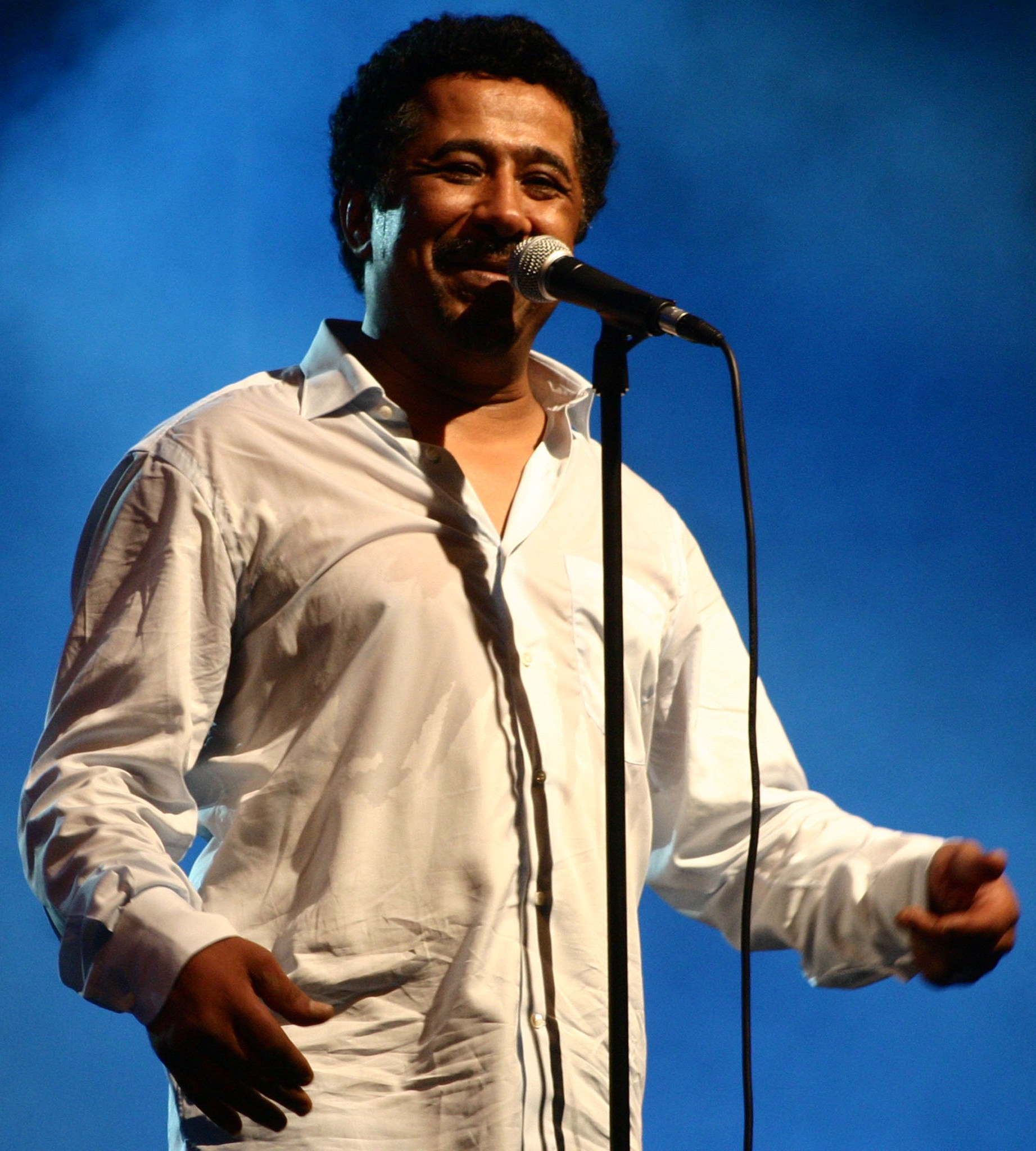
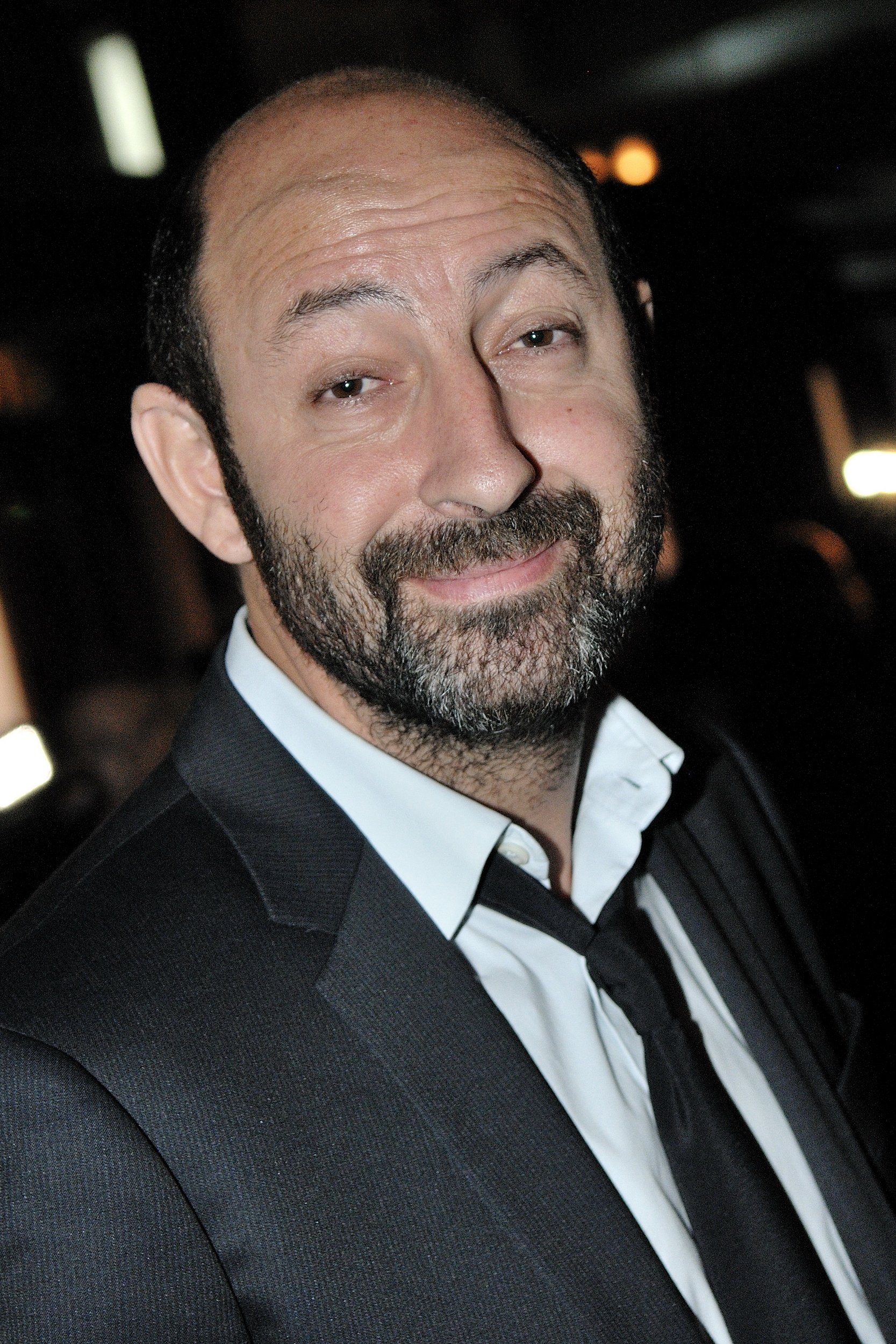
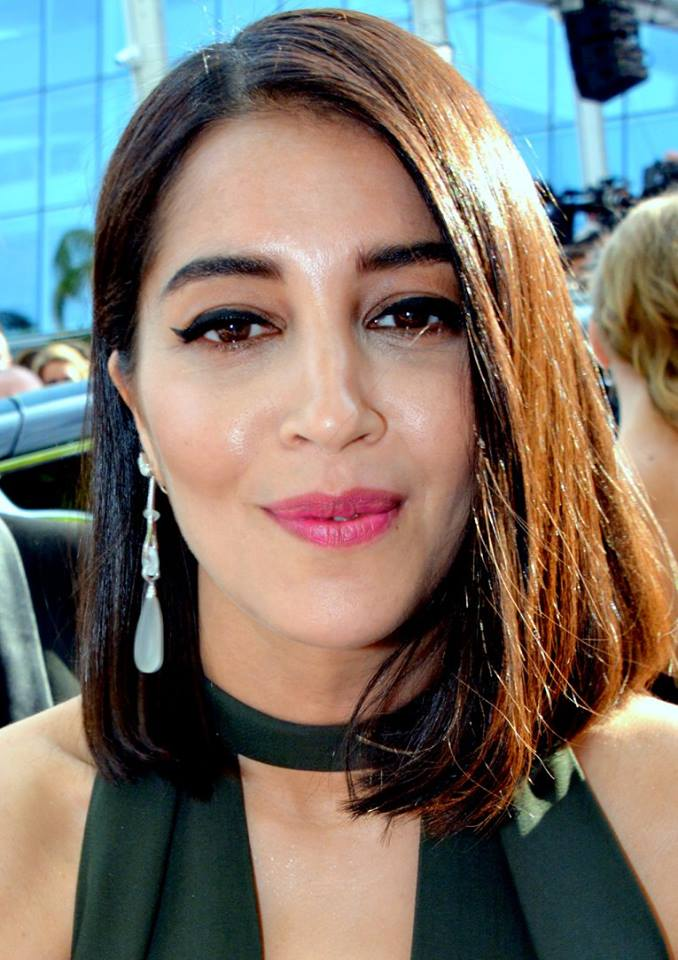
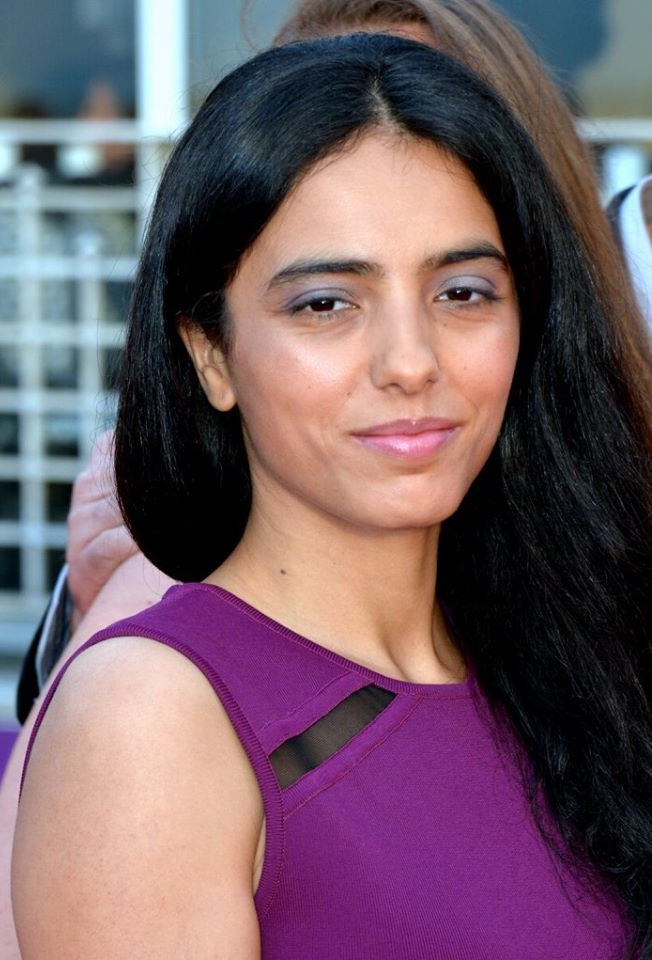
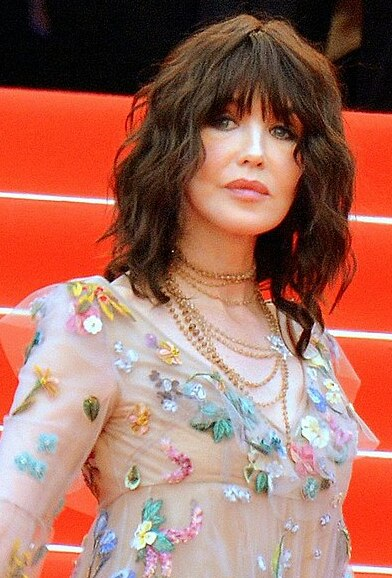
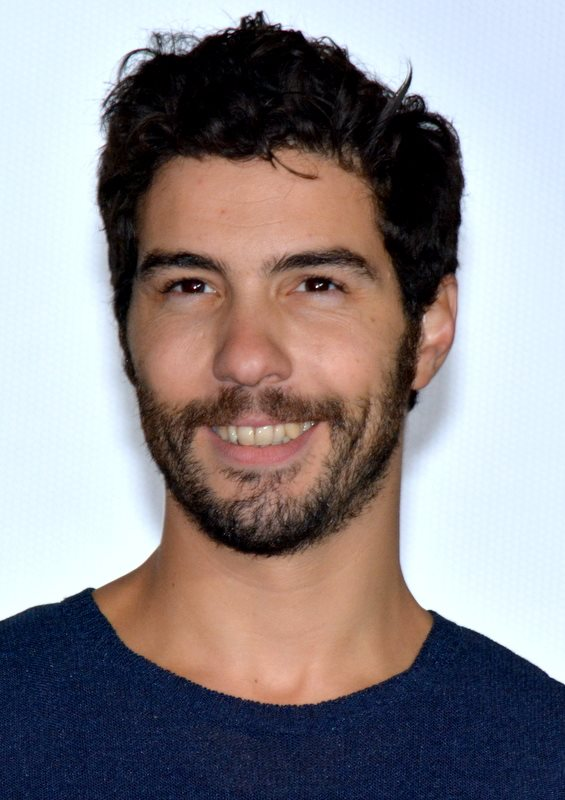
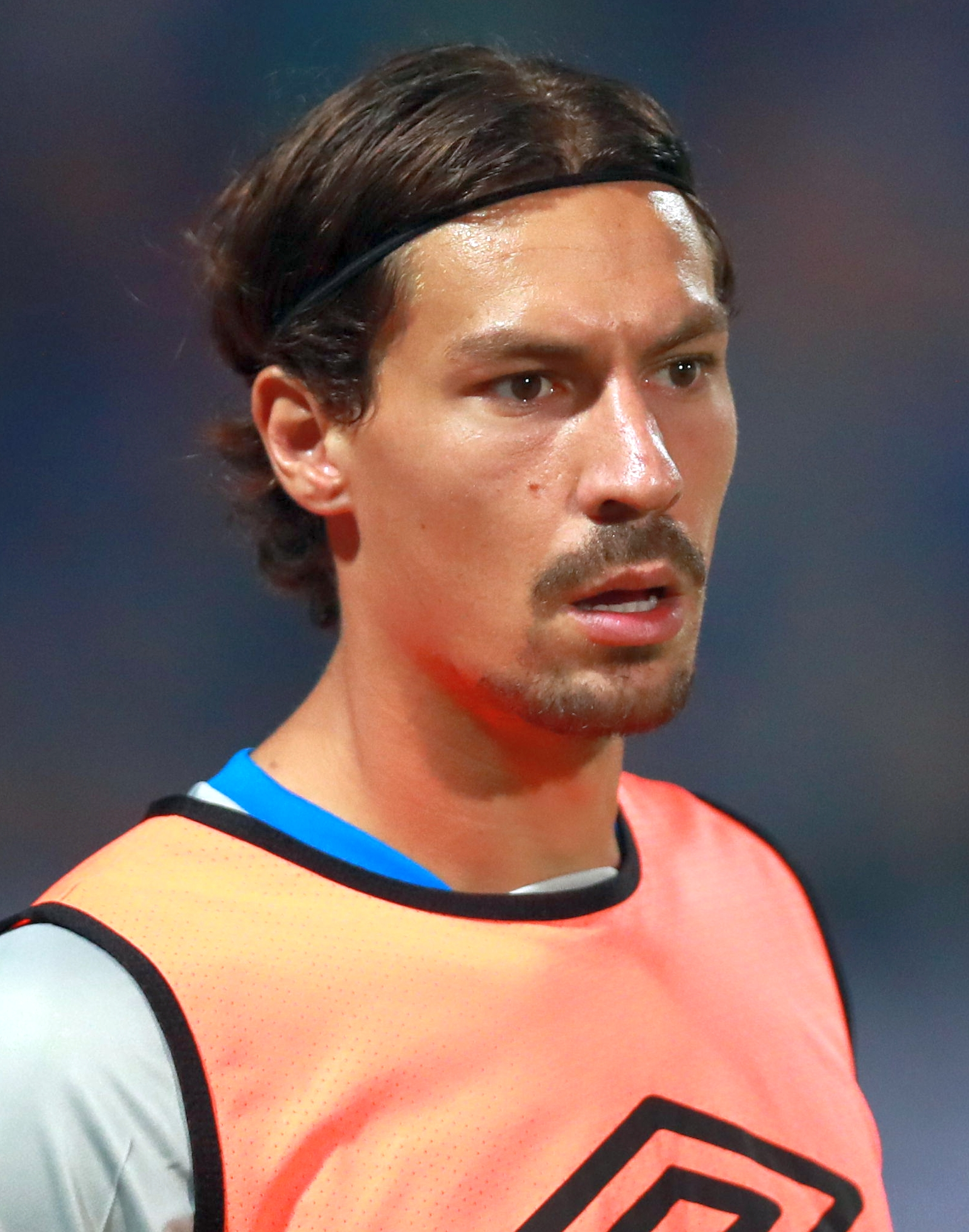
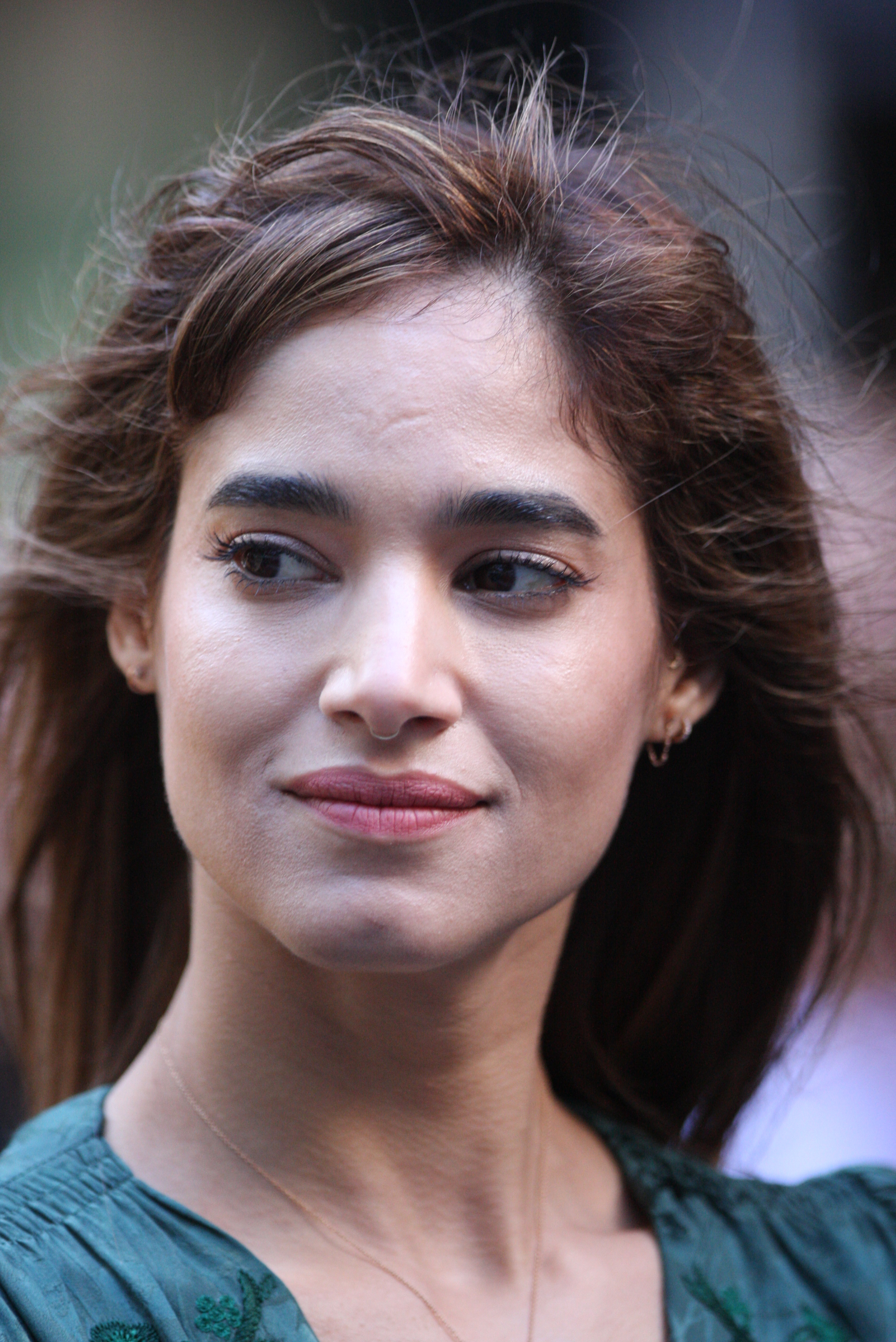
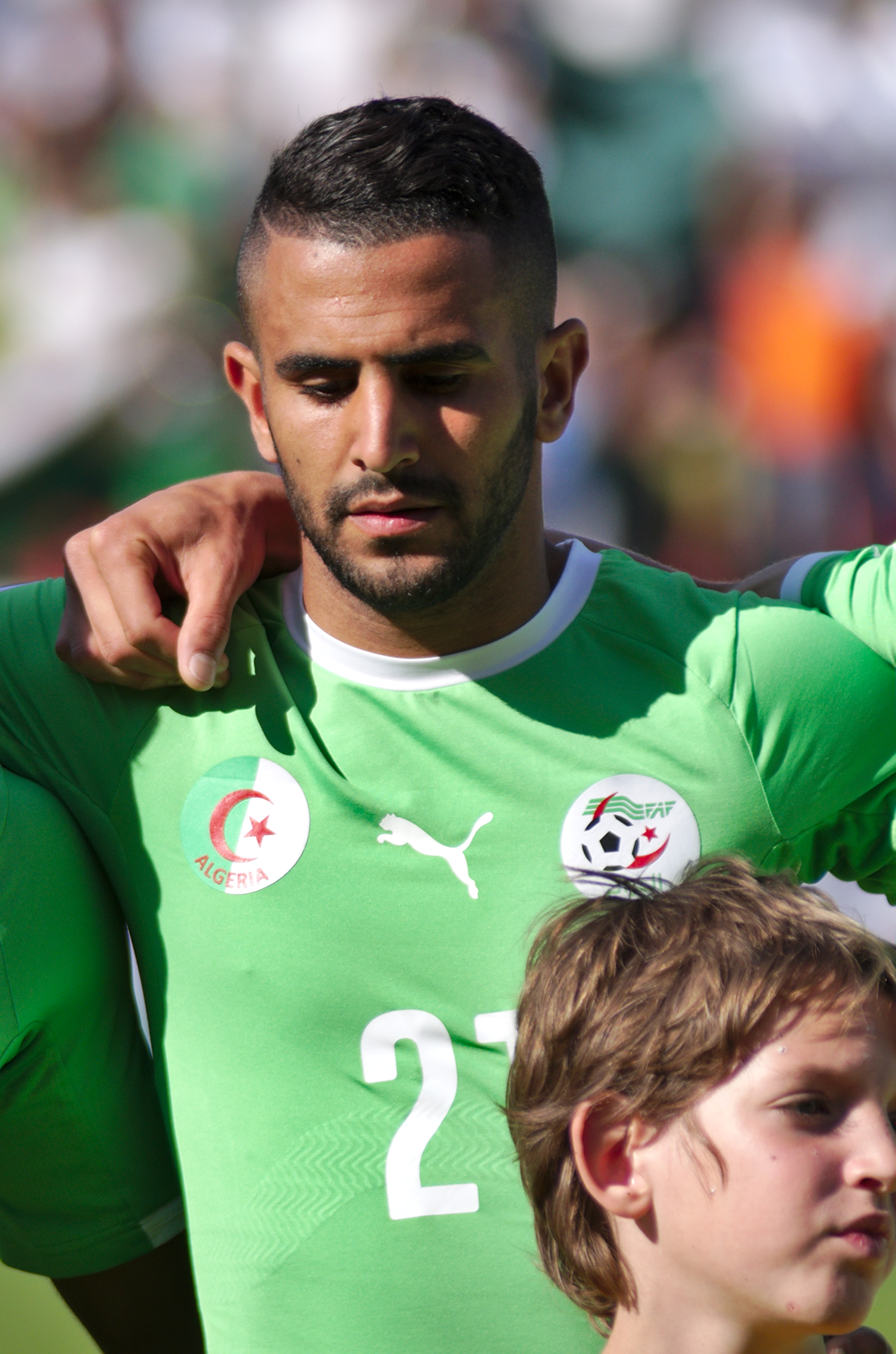
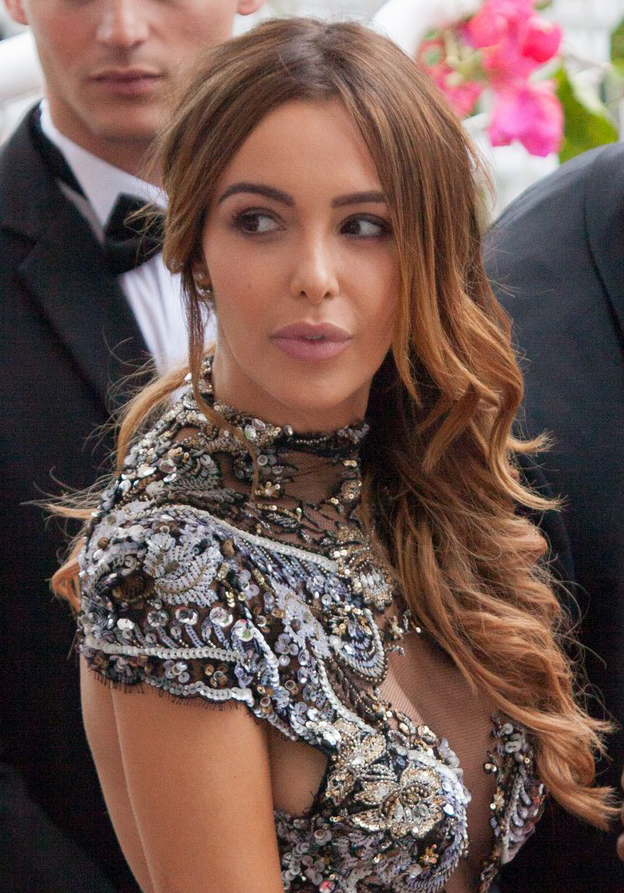
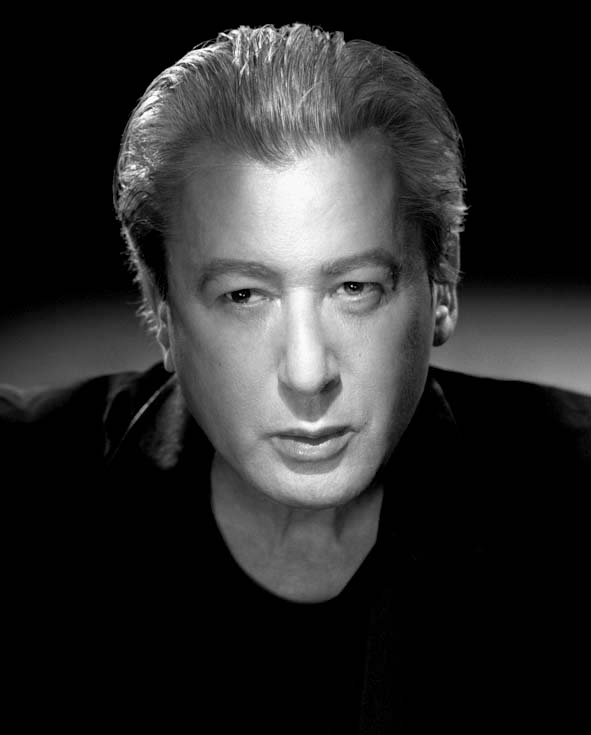
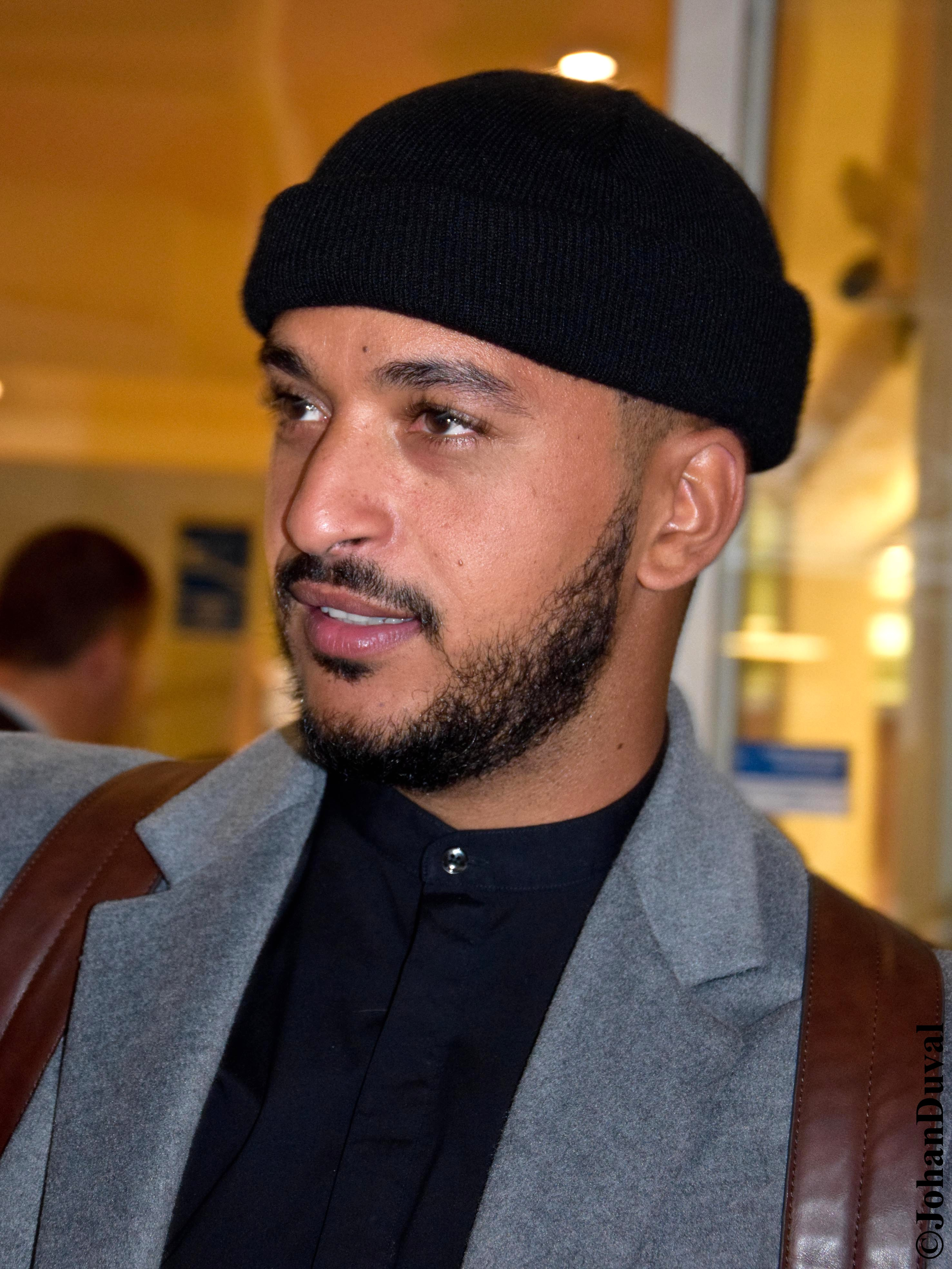
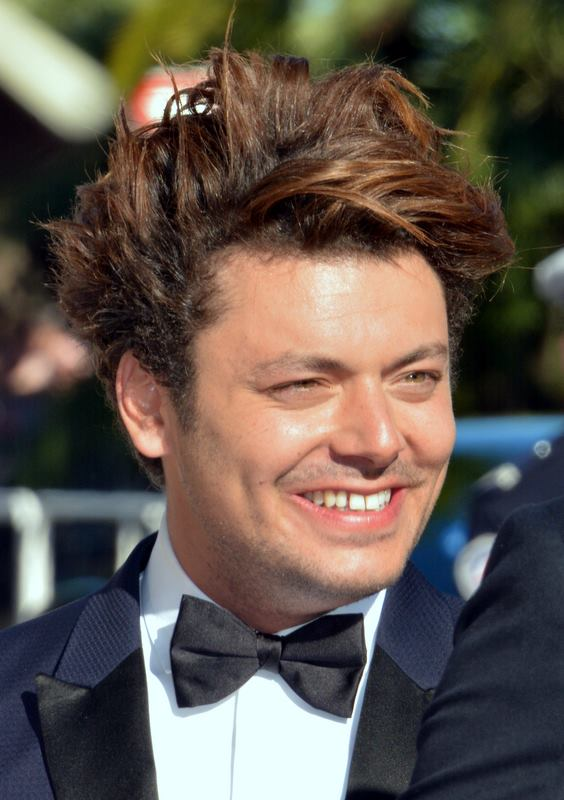
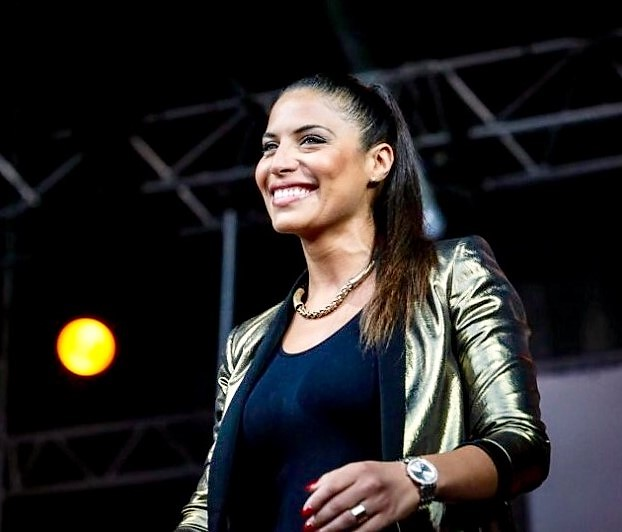
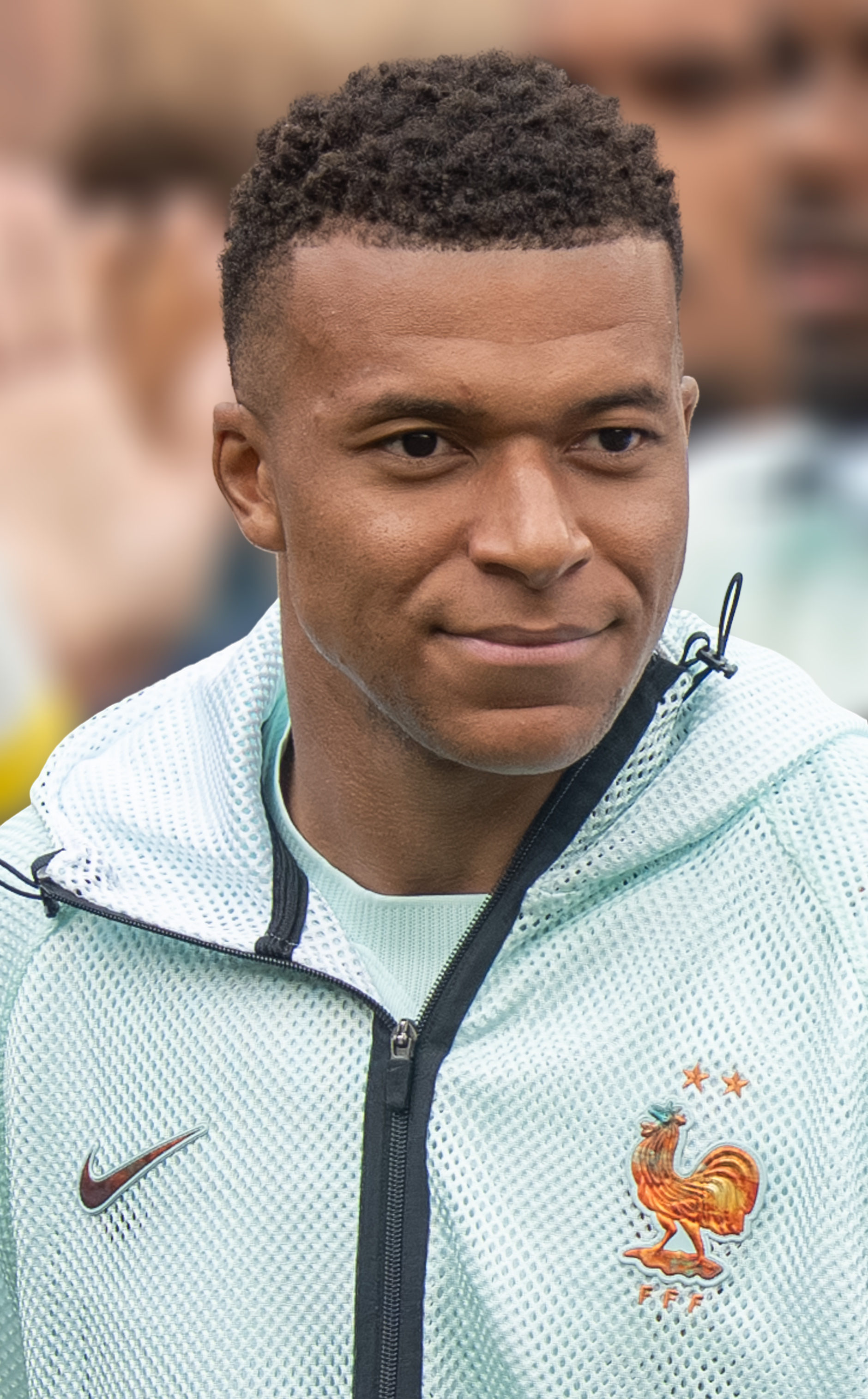
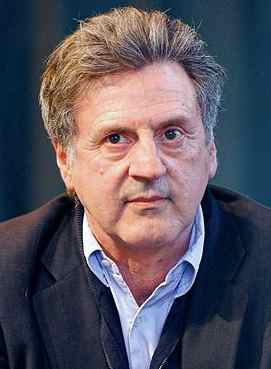
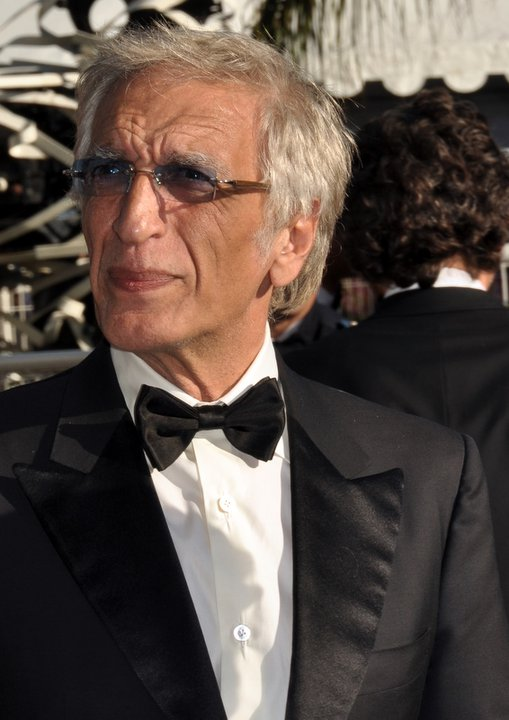
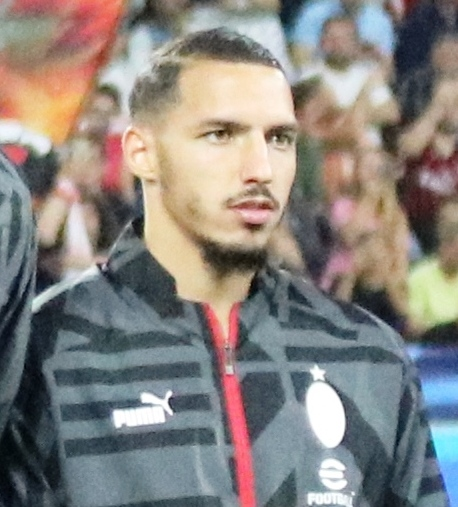
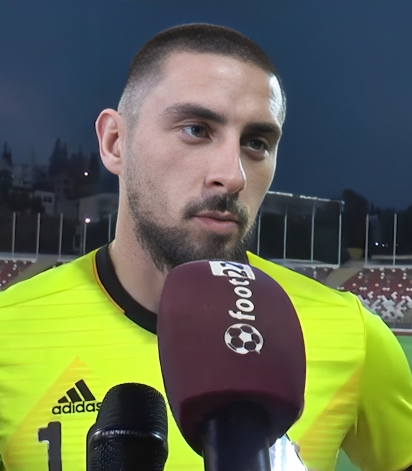
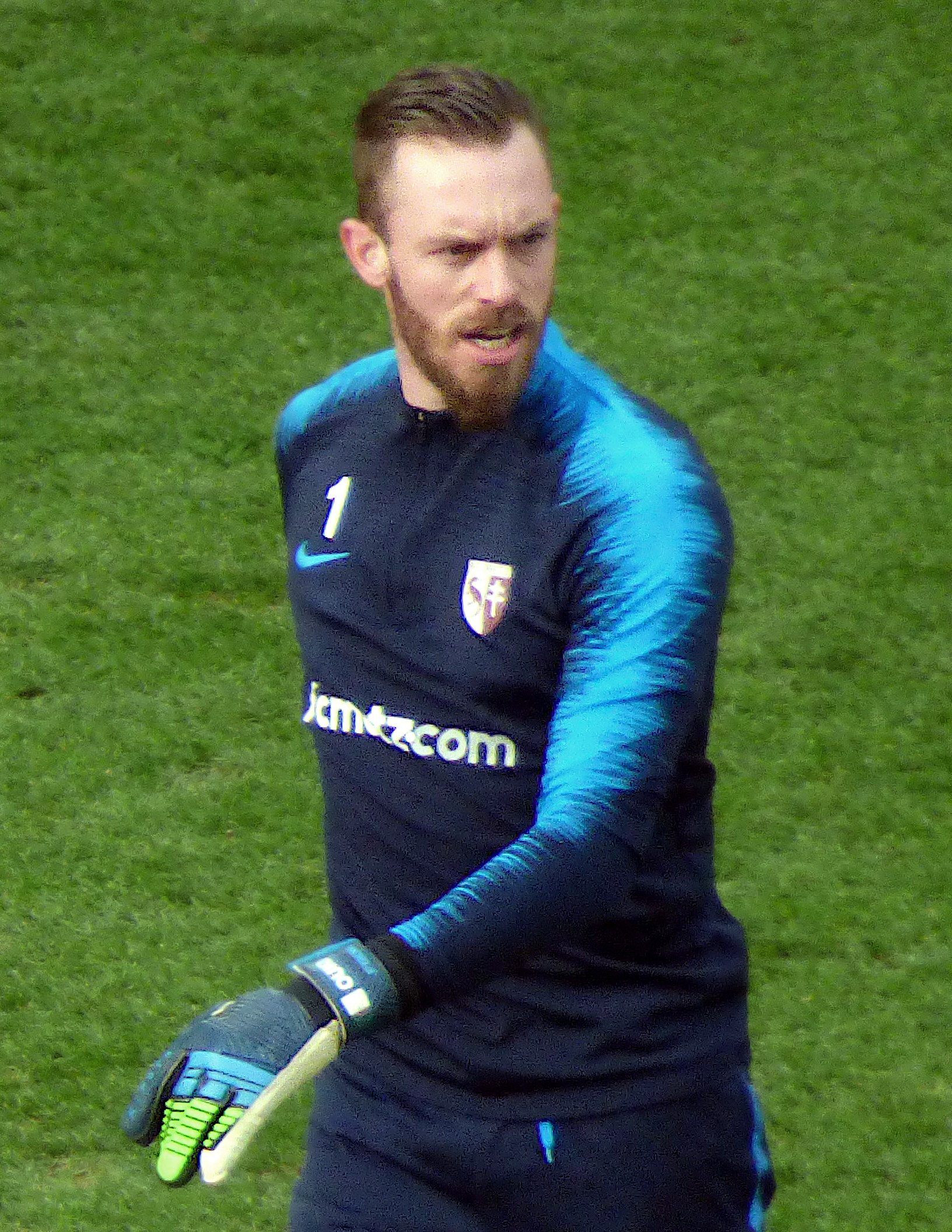
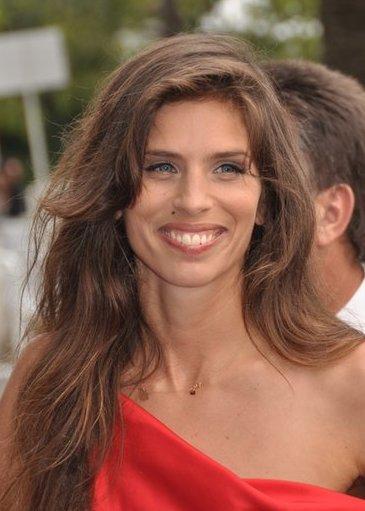
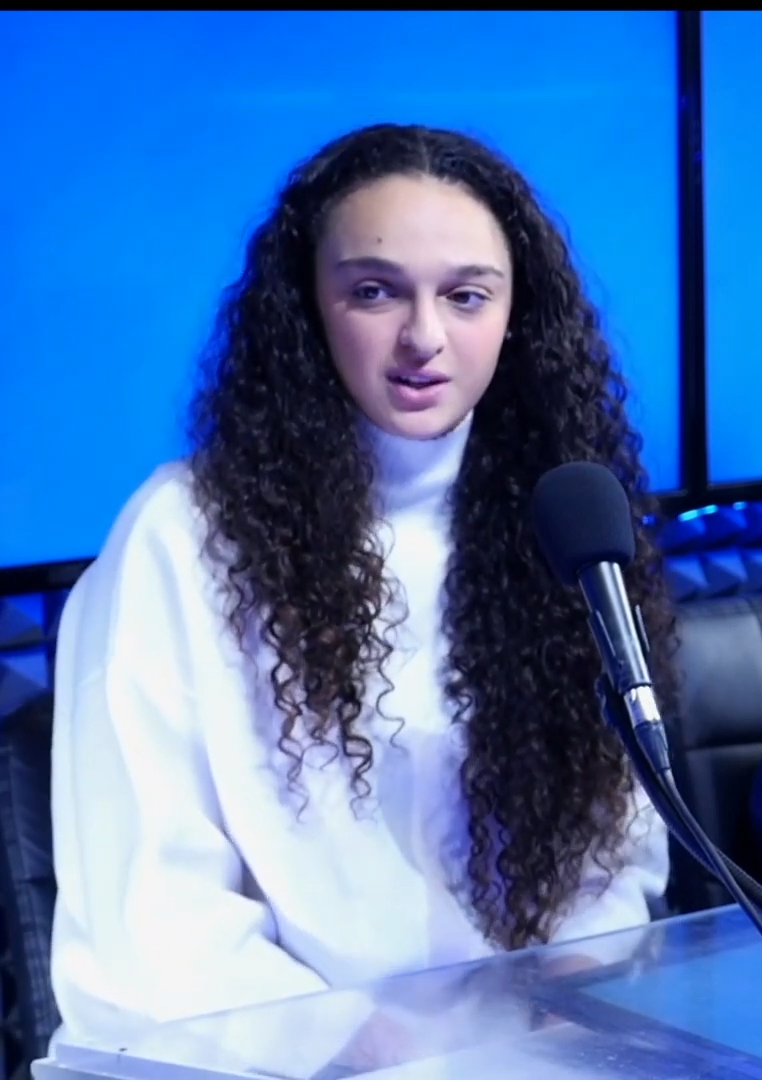
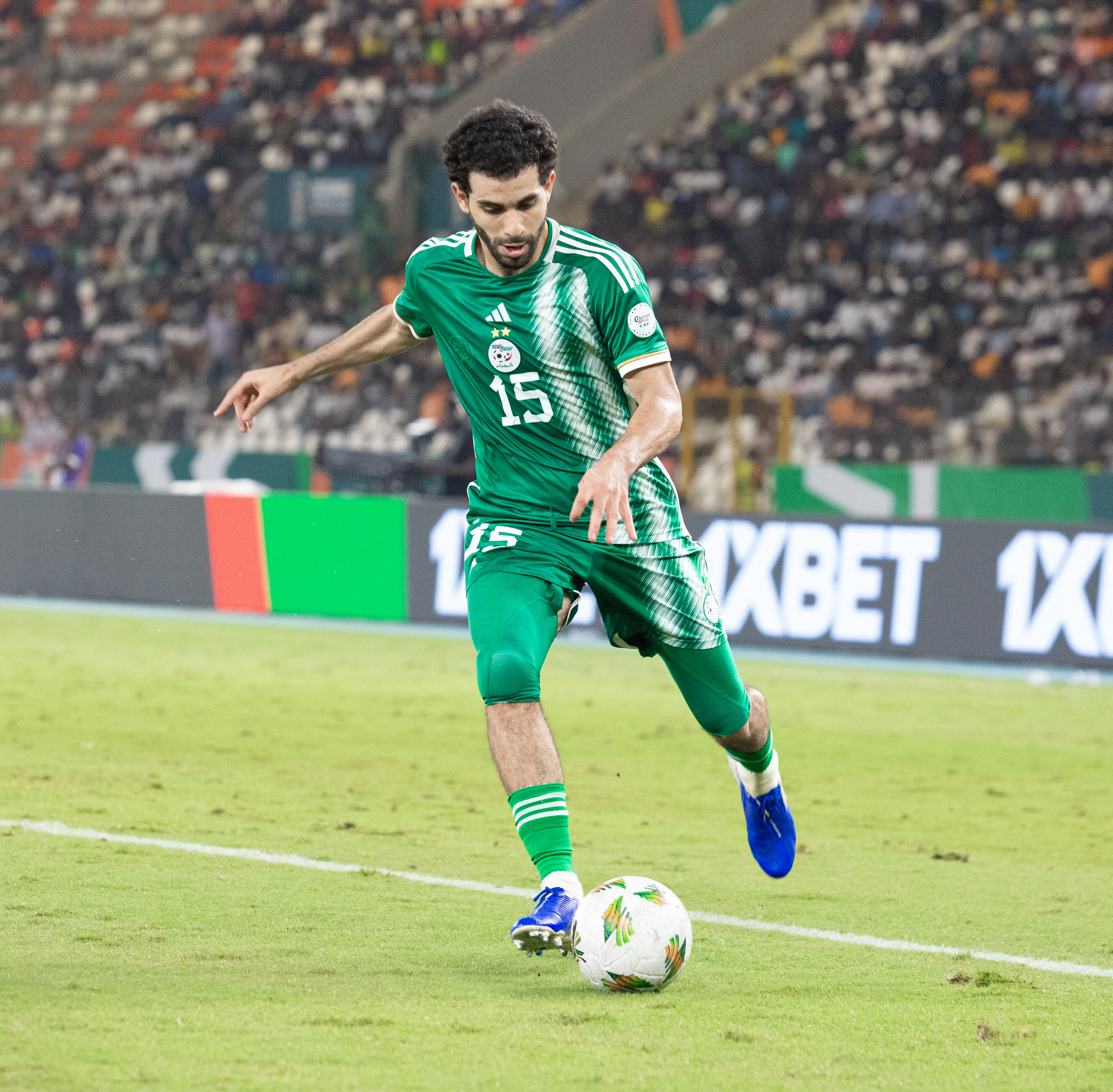
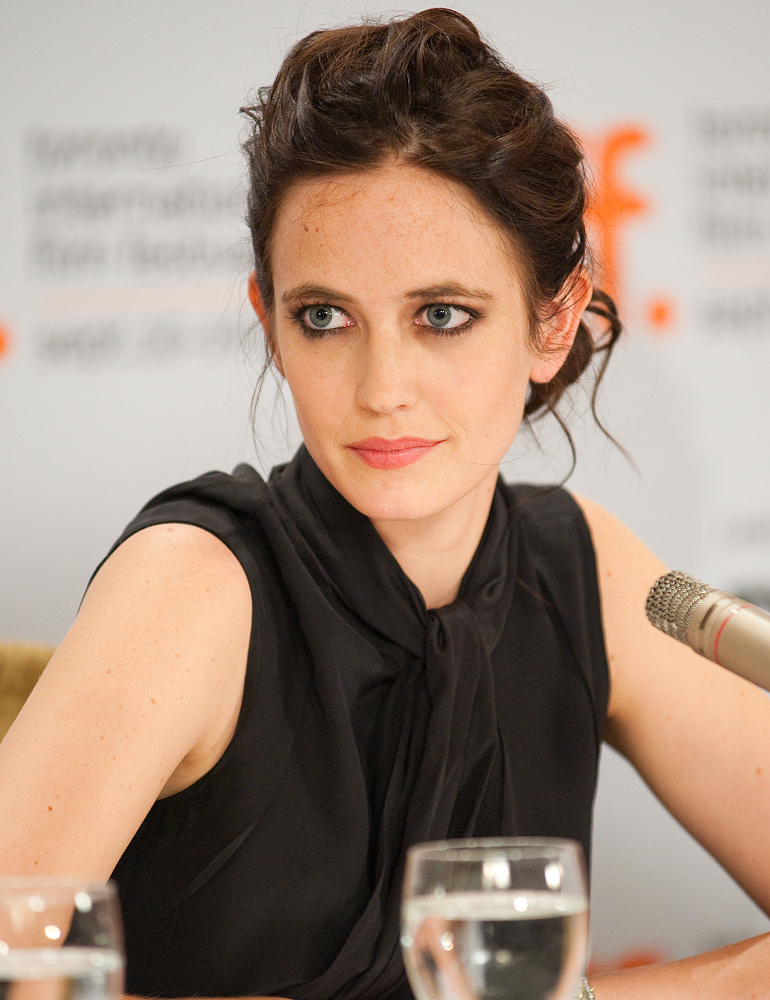
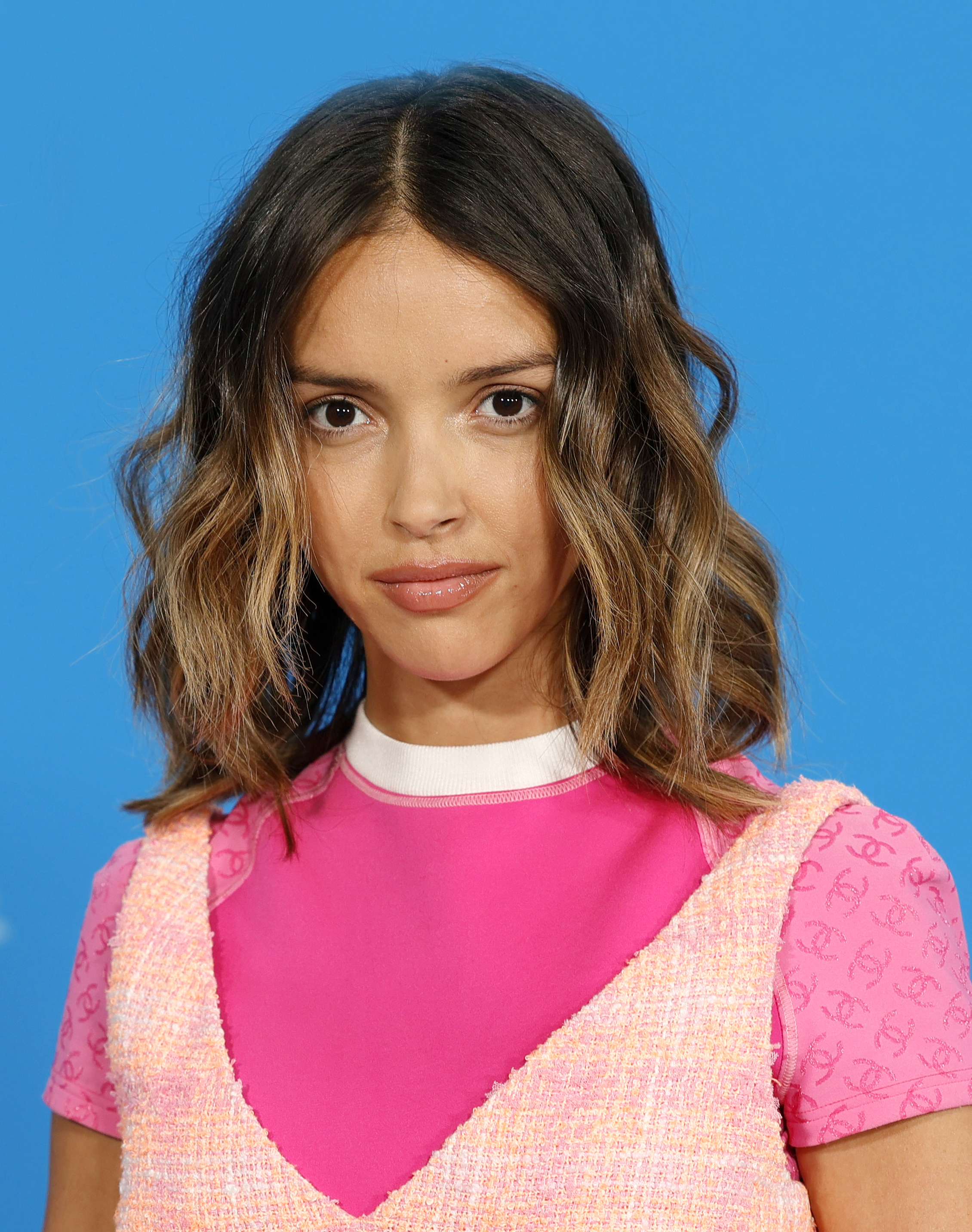
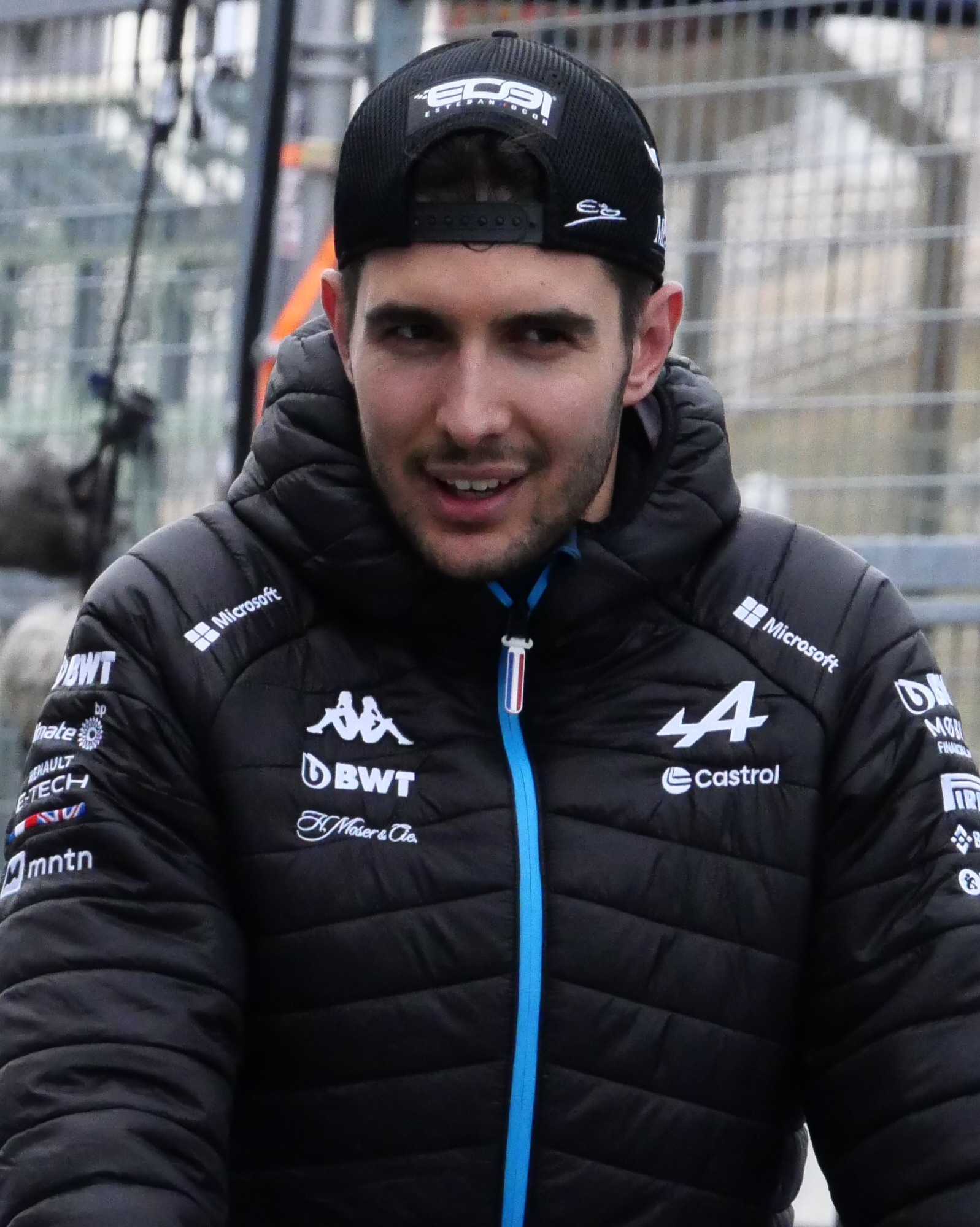
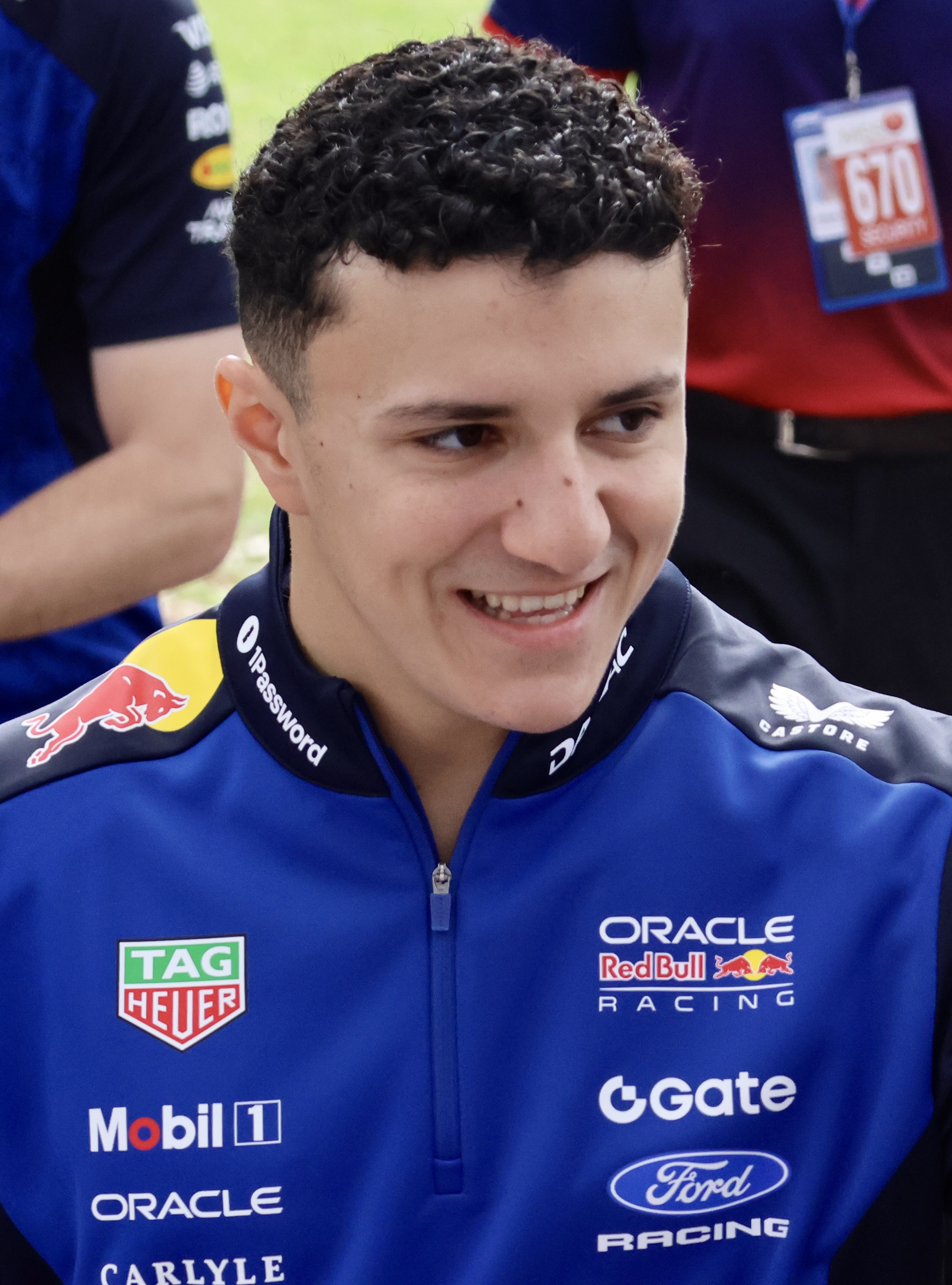
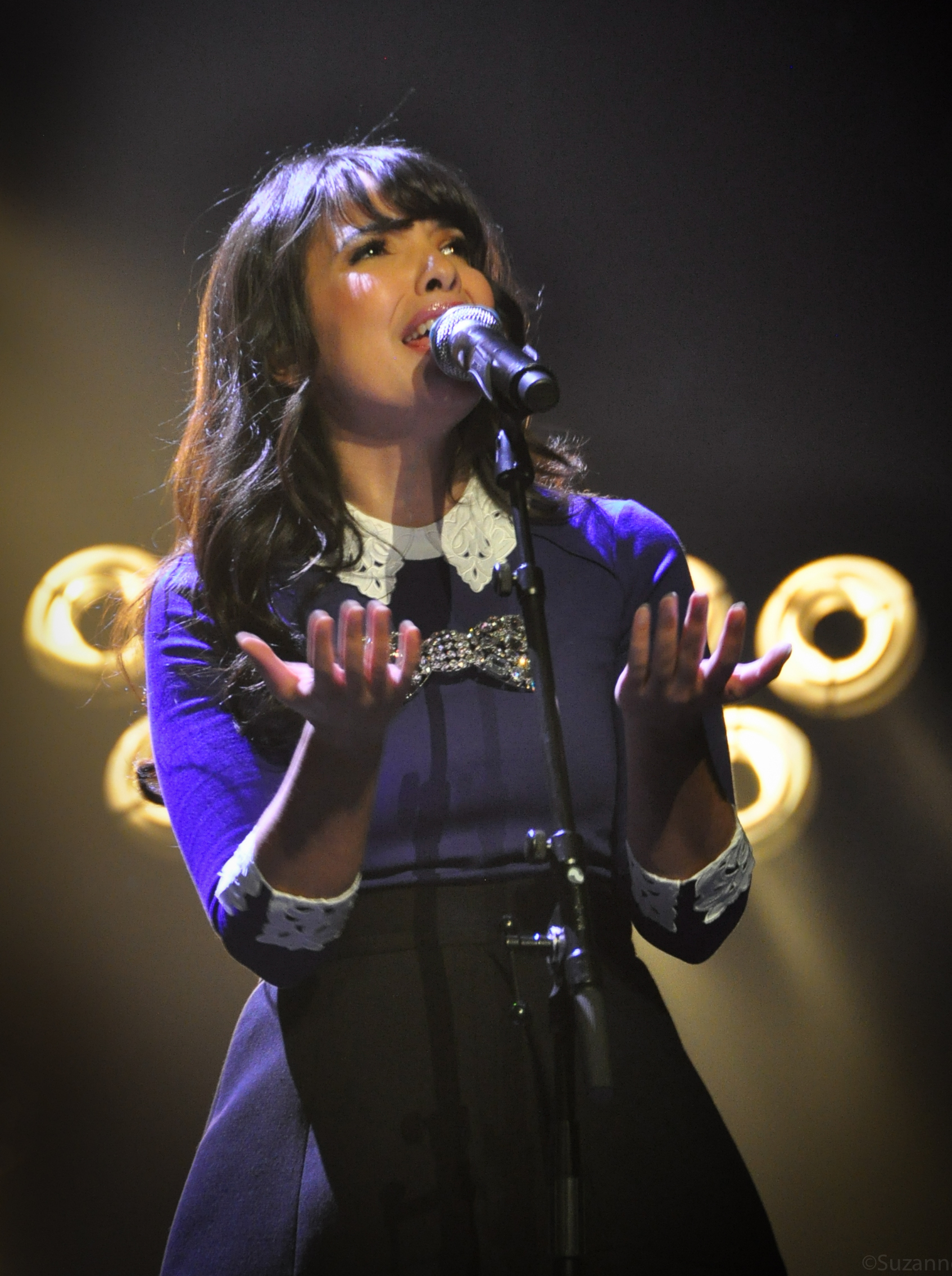
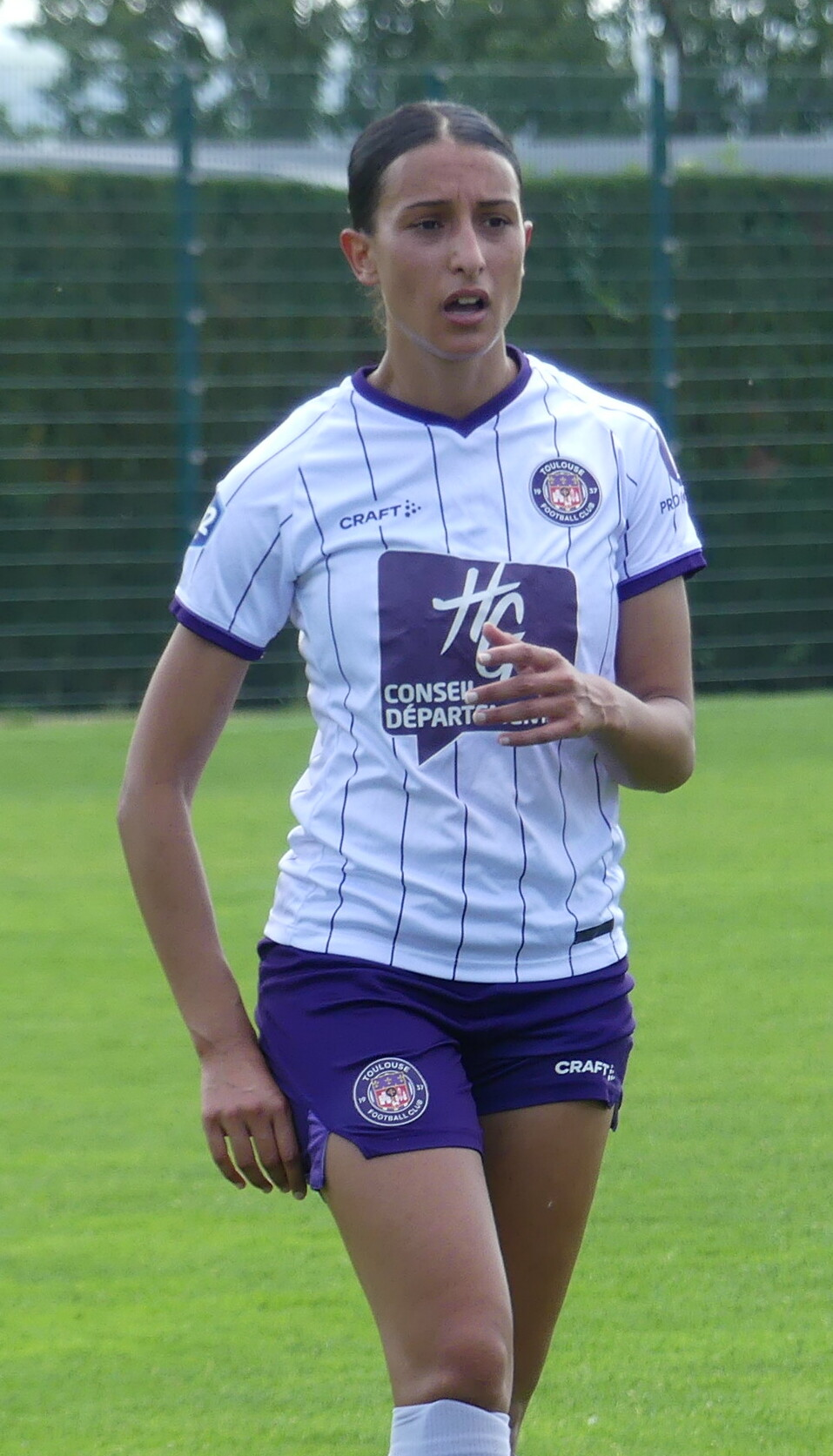
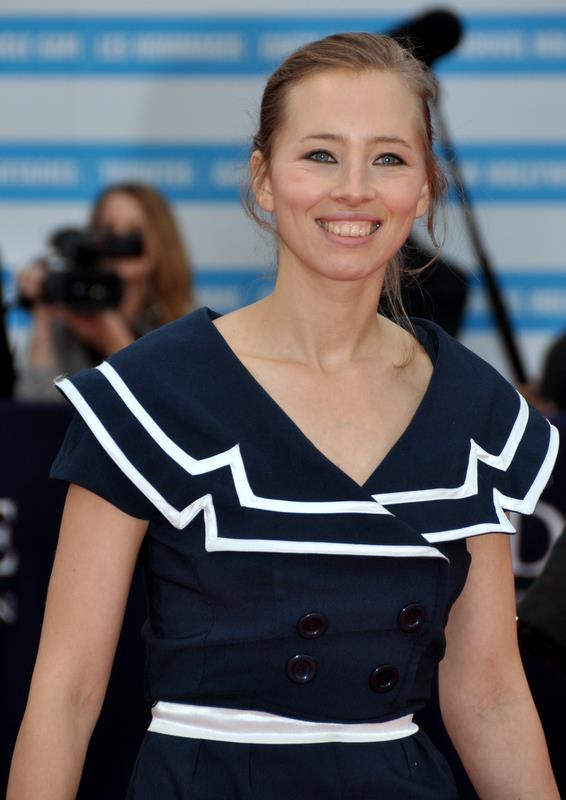
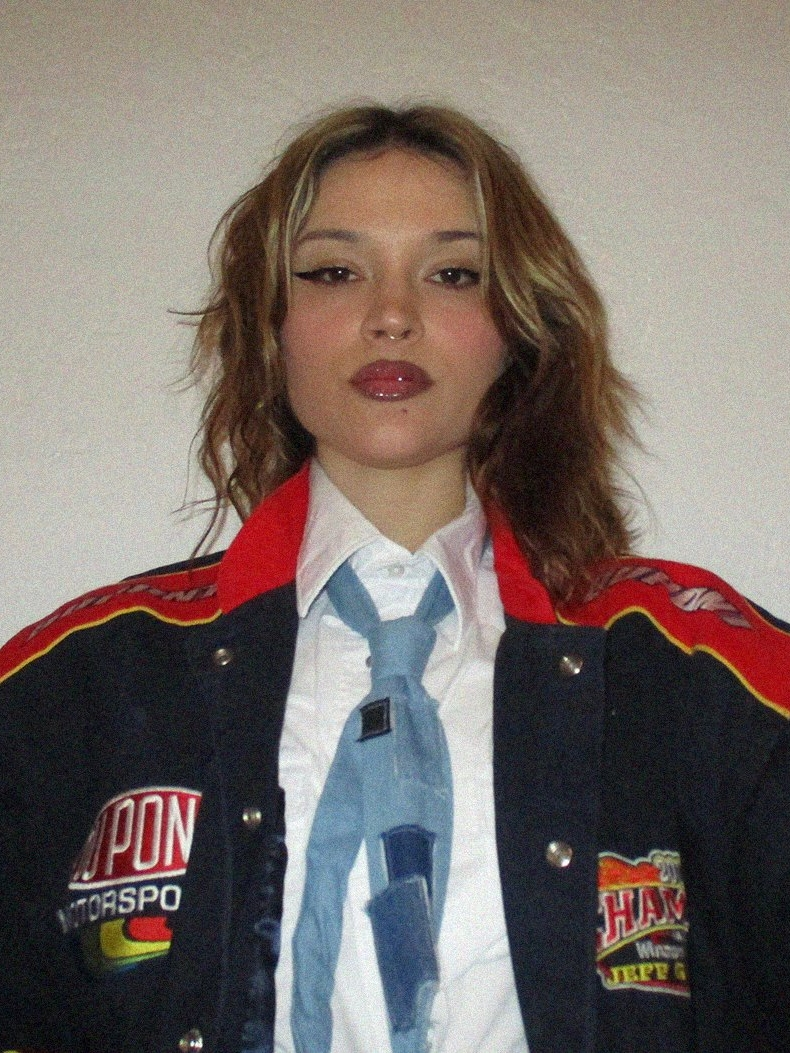
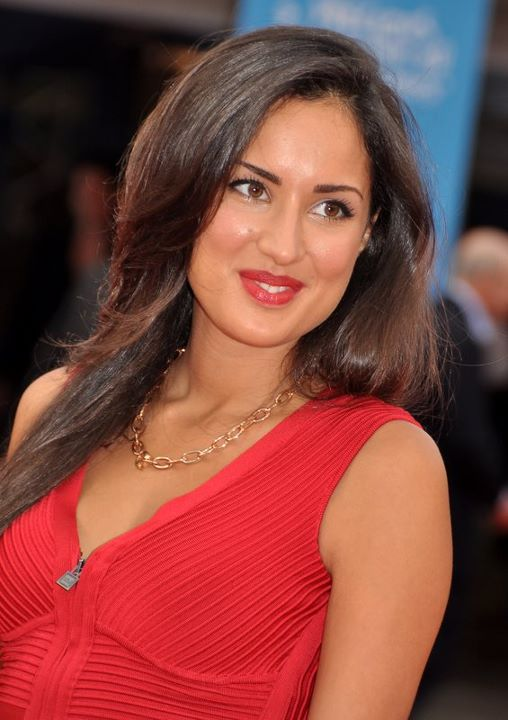
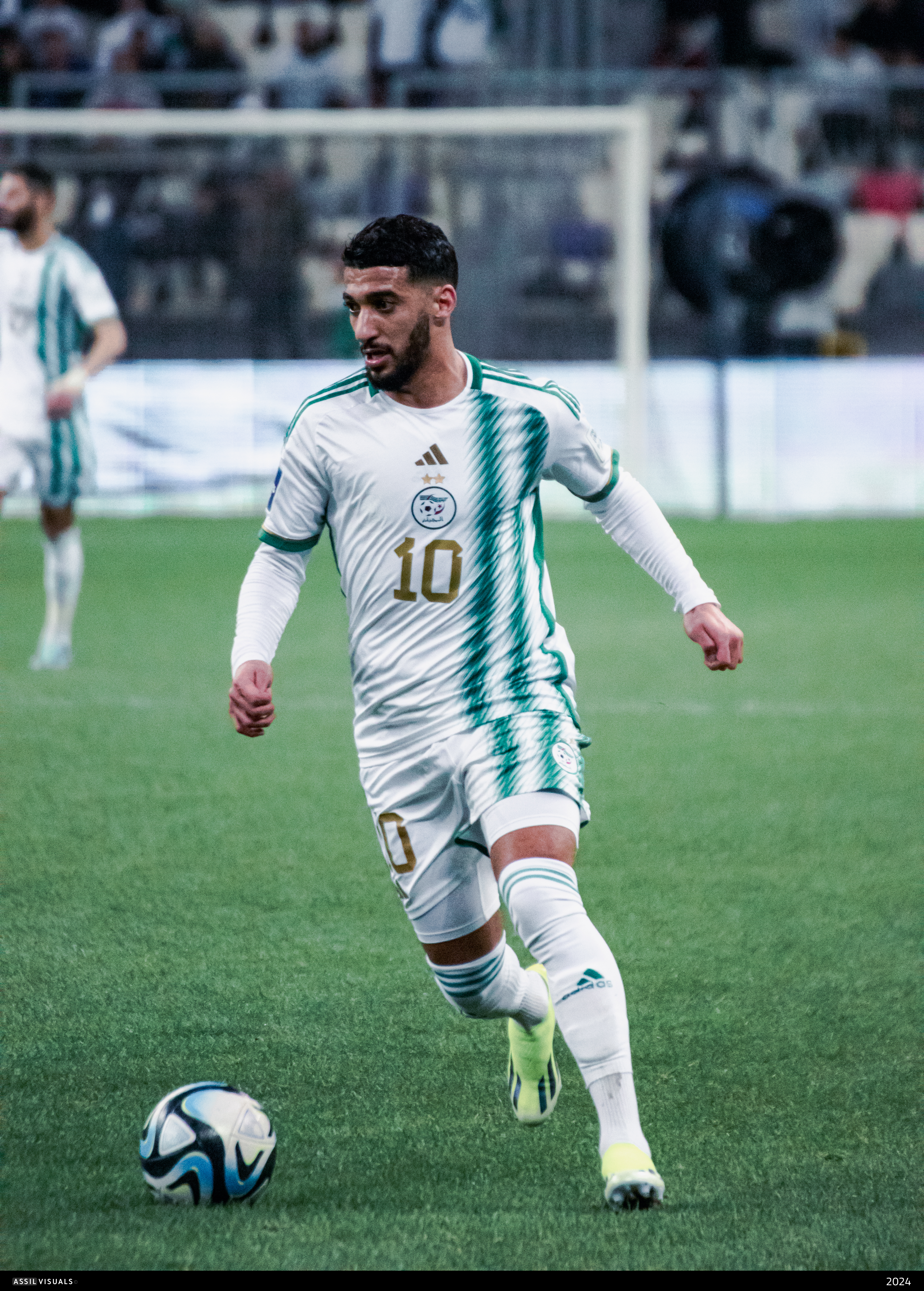
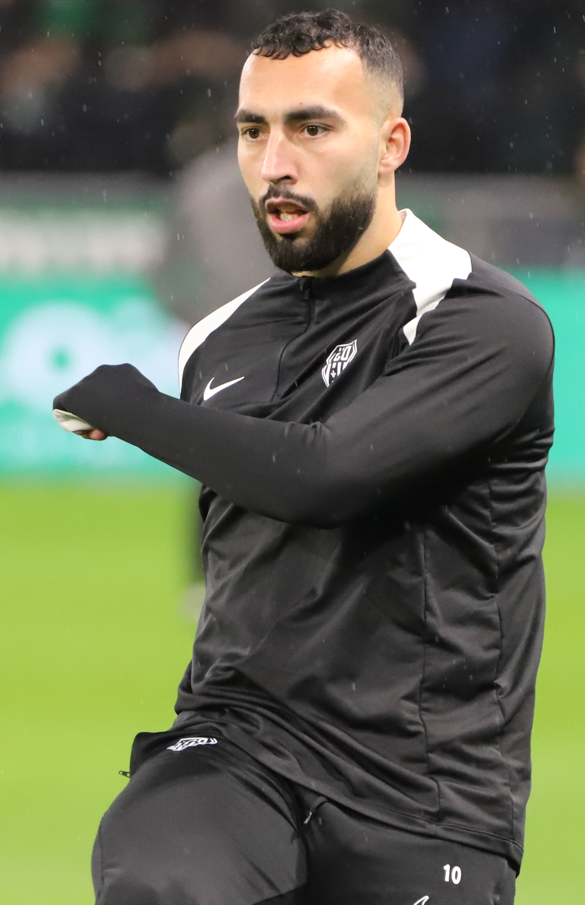
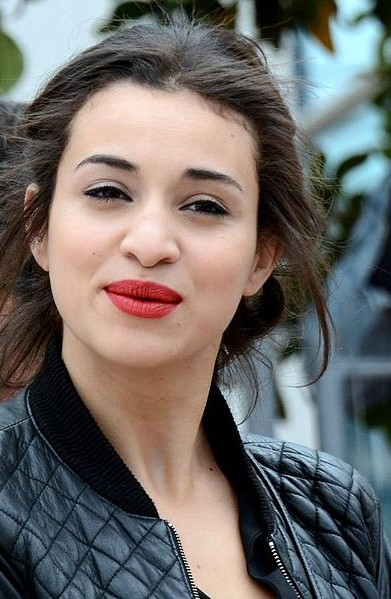
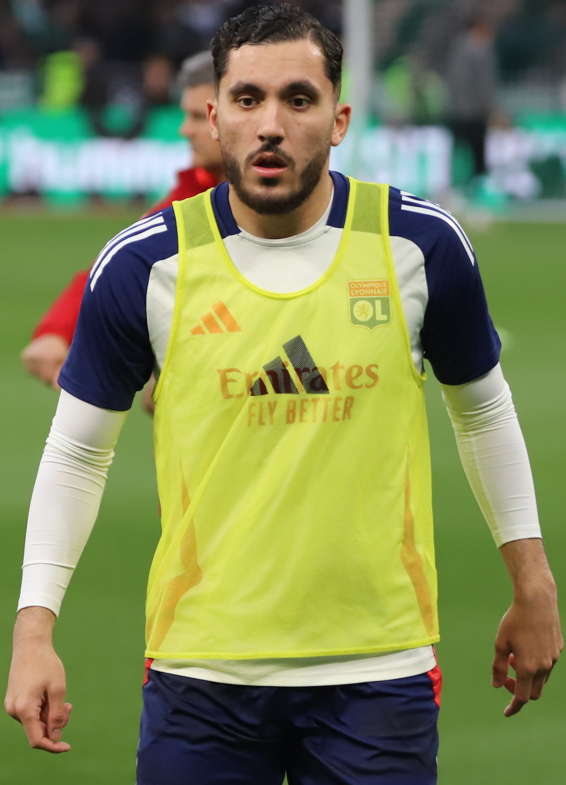
Zinedine Zidane	Karim Benzema	DJ Snake	Sheryfa Luna	Rachid Arhab	Nabil Fekir	Samir Nasri	Dany Boon
Éric Zemmour	Medi Sadoun	Amel Bent	Rachida Dati	Khaled	Kad Merad	Leïla Bekhti	Hafsia Herzi
Isabelle Adjani	Tahar Rahim	Benjamin Stambouli	Sofia Boutella	Riyad Mahrez	Nabilla Benattia	Alain Bashung	Slimane
Kev Adams	Zaho	Kylian Mbappé	Daniel Auteuil	Gérard Darmon	Ismaël Bennacer	Alexis Guendouz	Alexandre Oukidja
Maïwenn	Lina Boussaha	Rayan Aït-Nouri	Eva Green	Lyna Khoudri	Esteban Ocon	Isack Hadjar	Indila
Lina Khelif	Isild Le Besco	Lolo Zouaï	Sarah Kazemy	Saïd Benrahma	Himad Abdelli	Camelia Jordana	Rayan Cherki

== See also ==
- Algeria–France relations
- Islam in France
- Algerians in the United Kingdom
