= Algerians in the United Kingdom =

Algerian diaspora in the UK

Total population
- Algerian-born residents 31,394 (2021–2022 censuses)

Regions with significant populations
- Greater London, Birmingham, Manchester

Languages
- Arabic, Berber, British English, French

Religion
- Predominantly Sunni Islam

Algerians in the United Kingdom are residents of the UK with ancestry from Algeria. They include Algerian-born immigrants and their British-born descendants.

== Background ==
According to the Information Centre about Asylum and Refugees (ICAR), the UK's Algerian population is not well known or understood by the wider community. The number of Algerians was small until the early 1990s, since when it has increased, partly as a result of the Algerian Civil War of 1991 to 2002. However, the population remains small in comparison with other, more well-established refugee groups. ICAR also argue that "there is little sense of a unified 'community'" of Algerians in the UK and that there is some degree of mutual suspicion amongst British Algerians.

== Demographics ==
=== Population ===
In 1991, 3,453 Algerians nationals were resident in the UK. At the 2001 UK census, there were 10,670 Algerian born people living in the UK. The 2011 census recorded 23,601 residents of England, 328 of Wales, 895 of Scotland and 132 of Northern Ireland who were born in Algeria. The Office for National Statistics estimates that in 2017, 33,000 residents of the UK were born in Algeria.

In the 2021 UK census, 29,472 people in England were recorded as having been born in Algeria, as well as 373 people in Wales, and 222 in Northern Ireland. The census in Scotland was delayed by a year until 2022 and recorded 1,327 residents born in Algeria.

=== Population distribution ===
Most Algerians in the UK can be found in the Greater London area - in particular Walthamstow, Edgware, Leyton and Finsbury Park (area) (the latter of which has come to be commonly known as 'Little Algiers'). Besides the British capital, significant communities of Algerians reside in Glasgow, Sheffield, Birmingham, Manchester, Leicester and Bournemouth.

The National Association of British Arabs categorises Algeria-born immigrants as Arabs. Based on 2011 census data, it indicates that they are the fifth largest population of British Arabs by country of birth.

=== Age and gender ===
A 2007 investigation by the International Organization for Migration found that the Algerian community in the UK in general was fairly young, close to half of all Algerians in the UK were projected to be under 40 years old. As already explained, the Algerian community in the UK is a fairly small but fast emerging ethnic group. The same IOM investigation suggested that out of all the Algerians living in the UK, 20% of them were registered in the 1991 UK Census and a further 30% in 2001 UK Census - with the remaining 50% having come during the first decade of the 21st century. In terms of gender, the 2001 census showed that 71% of Algerians in the UK were male, whilst recent estimates have suggested the imbalance between males and females could be even greater. This is thought to be down to the fact that men without documents are more likely to reach the UK than women without documents.

== Religion ==
Most Algerians living in the UK are Muslims. The East London Mosque attracts a number of Algerians. However, the Suleymaniye Mosque, which is owned by the British-Turkish community, is also reported to attract many Algerians (especially Algerian Turks).

== Asylum seekers ==
Algeria is a significant source of asylum seekers to the UK. Most of these are law-abiding and peaceful citizens, but numerous Algerian individuals residing in the UK have come to public attention due to their extremist views. Algeria is by far the largest source of applications for asylum from Arab North Africa to the UK and alongside Somalia, the Democratic Republic of the Congo, Nigeria and Sierra Leone as the African countries with the highest number of individuals applying for and receiving asylum rights in the UK. Below is a table showing the number of Algerians who applied for asylum in the UK compared to the number who actually gained it (1998–2007).

	1998	1999	2000	2001	2002	2003	2004	2005	2006	2007
Applications received	1,260	1,385	1,635	1,140	1,060	550	490	255	225	260
Applications accepted	310	475	65	65	20	5	10	5	0	0
Applications rejected	950	910	1,570	1,075	1,040	545	480	250	225	260
Percentage successful	25%	34%	4%	6%	2%	1%	2%	2%	0%	0%

== Citizenship acquisition ==
Below is a table showing how many Algerians were granted British citizenship and the right of abode (1998–2007).

	1998	1999	2000	2001	2002	2003	2004	2005	2006	2007
Persons granted citizenship	332	376	629	705	1,345	1,145	1,255	1,485	1,015	1,170

== Notable people ==
- Zaida Ben-Yusuf: portrait photographer born in England where she spent her early years before moving to America. In 1901 she was considered as one of the "foremost women photographers in America" by the Ladies Home Journal.
- Faysal Bettache, English professional footballer who plays as a midfielder for Oldham Athletic on loan from Queens Park Rangers.
- Cy Curnin, British singer/songwriter and musician
- Elyes Gabel: actor well known for his roles in the BBC dramas Casualty and Waterloo Road as well as his role in Seasons 1 and 2 of the Game of Thrones series
- Benali Hamdache, Green Party politician
- Simone Lahbib, Scottish actress
- Rachida Lamri: writer, musician and cultural activist. She is the founder of Culturama, a cultural organisation, DzFest, an Algerian Festival for Arts and Culture in the UK and the Algerian Music Association of London (AMAL)
- Tarik O'Regan: composer. He is a recipient of two British Composer Awards and some of his work has been recognised with two Grammy nominations

== Relevant Community Associations ==
- The National Algerian Centre (NAC)
- Culturama - A non profit organisation for the promotion of Algerian culture since 2013
- AMAL - The Algerian Music Association of London
- Finsbury Park Mosque (North London Central Mosque Trust)
- Al Manaar Mosque (The Muslim Cultural Heritage Centre (MCHC))

Organisations for cultural festivals

- Algerian Culture Festival (ACF)
- Algerian Culture Collective (ACC)
- DzFest - The Algerian Festival for Arts & Culture in the UK

== See also ==
- Algeria–United Kingdom relations
- Algerian diaspora
