= Algerians in Spain =

- (Algeria) (Spain)

Total population
- 103,935 (2025)

Regions with significant populations
- Valencia, Barcelona, Madrid

Languages
- Arabic (Algerian Arabic), Catalan, and Spanish

Religion
- mainly Sunni Islam

The presence of Algerians in Spain dates back to the 1990s.

== Numbers ==
As of 2025, in Spain, there are 103,935 regular immigrants from Algeria. The three cities with most number of Algerians are: Alicante, Barcelona, and Zaragoza.

== Algerians in Spain ==
- Adlène Guedioura
- Alejandro Agag (born 1970), businessperson
- Yuri Berchiche (born 1990), footballer

== See also ==
- Algeria–Spain relations
- Arabs in Spain
- Black people in Spain
