= Ukrainian refugee crisis in Mexico =

After the Russian invasion of Ukraine was initiated in February 2022, the Government of Mexico allowed the installation of Ukrainian refugee camps in the northern border cities, with Tijuana being the city that has hosted the most Ukrainian refugees, with an estimated 9,902 Ukrainian citizens, 531 refugees in Mexico City and 18 refugees in Cancún, crossing the border into the United States and some asking for asylum in Mexico, making it one of many countries in the Americas with the greatest number of Ukrainians.

== Background ==
On 24 February 2022, Ukraine was invaded by Russia, and thousands of Ukrainian citizens were left homeless. Mexico is the one of many countries in the Americas that received the refugees during the armed conflict. This is mainly due to the proximity to Canada and the United States, which also sheltered Ukrainian civilians. Many Ukrainians tried to reach the Mexican border in cities like Tijuana, but crossing the borders was momentarily complicated, so they were stranded as refugees on Mexican soil.

== Destinations ==
The arrival of thousands of Ukrainians, Russians and Belarusians in the last months of 2022 to Mexico, who entered as tourists by air in Cancún, Los Cabos and Mexico City, while others crossed the Guatemala border. The majority of refugees have family and friends in the United States, but some have encountered difficulties in accessing that nation and their stay in Mexico has been longer than expected. To avoid conflicts with the National Institute of Migration (INM), the government of Mexico has designated permanent asylum for all Ukrainian and Russian citizens who have arrived in the country as tourists or war refugees. This emergent measure of humanitarian aid has been used twice in Mexico in the 20th century, the first time during the Spanish Civil War and the second time during World War II.

The confrontation between Ukrainian and Russian troops forced Mexican immigration authorities to establish a refugee camp for Ukrainians and another refugee camp for Russians and Belarusians who were also requesting asylum in the neighboring United States. Although the majority of Ukrainians and Russians crossed there, a percentage of them stayed because not all of them managed to gather the documentation to enter the neighboring country; many had to integrate into the immigrant communities of Mexico.

== See also ==
- Ukrainian refugee crisis
- Mexico–Ukraine relations
