= Myanmar–Ukraine relations =

- Myanmar: Ukraine

Myanmar (also known as Burma) and Ukraine had diplomatic relations from 1999 until 2021, when they were suspended as a result of the 2021 Myanmar coup d'état. Ukraine has a non resident ambassador in Bangkok.

== History ==
Ukraine and Myanmar established diplomatic relations on 19 January 1999, on the same day that Myanmar recognized Ukraine's independence.

Since 2015, Ukrainian military companies, including state-owned firms, have sold large supplies of military equipment to Myanmar's military, according to a report from the organization Justice for Myanmar (JFM). In January 2017, Aung Hlaing Oo, an important Burmese arms trader, was made Ukraine's honorary consul to Myanmar. In 2018, the two countries signed an agreement establishing a cooperative relationship with military technology, which entered into effect in June 2019. At the time, Myanmar's government was mostly controlled by the National League for Democracy party, and not by the Tatmadaw, Myanmar's military that has ruled the country with military juntas intermittently throughout its modern history. While Ukraine's arms contributions to Myanmar are significantly lower than those from China and Russia, JFM has criticized the joint projects, arguing that any increased arms flow to Myanmar will create "an alarming boost to the Myanmar military’s arms manufacturing capabilities", as well as fuel "war crimes and crimes against humanity" by the Tatmadaw.

After the Tatmadaw seized control of the government again in the 2021 Myanmar coup d'état, relations between the Ukrainian and Myanmar governments were suspended. Ukrainian UN representatives voted for a resolution demanding a halt of arms deliveries to Myanmar's military, the Tatmadaw. However, some Ukrainian military firms continued to send arms to Myanmar at least as late as September 2021.

On 25 February 2022, shortly after the beginning of the full-scale Russian invasion of Ukraine, the Tatmadaw military junta expressed its support for the invasion. Tatmadaw general Zaw Min Tun, citing the reasons for this support, said that "Russia has worked to consolidate its sovereignty" and that the war would "show the world that Russia is a world power". In contrast, the National Unity Government of Myanmar (NUG) - the government-in-exile of the pre-coup government - condemned the invasion as "unprovoked acts of war directed against Ukraine and its people" that went contrary to international law. The NUG also expressed solidarity with Ukraine and its people. As the war has progressed, Myanmar's military has also sold arms to Russia, according to Ukrainian intelligence leader Kyrylo Budanov. Tatmadaw junta representatives denied the claims.

== Ukrainians in Myanmar ==
There are "about 100 Ukrainian citizens" who live in Myanmar.

== See also ==
- Foreign relations of Myanmar
- Foreign relations of Ukraine
