= Foreign relations of Ukraine =

Countries with which Ukraine (marked with red) has diplomatic relations.

Ukraine has formal relations with many nations and in recent decades has been establishing diplomatic relations with an expanding circle of nations. The foreign relations of Ukraine are guided by a number of key priorities outlined in the foreign policy of Ukraine.

== Western relations ==
Ukraine considers Euro-Atlantic integration its primary foreign policy objective, but in practice balances its relationship with Europe and the United States while attempting to sever its considerable ties to Russia. The European Union's Partnership and Cooperation Agreement (PCA) with Ukraine went into force on March 1, 1998. The European Union (EU) has encouraged Ukraine to implement the PCA fully before discussions begin on an association agreement. The EU Common Strategy toward Ukraine, issued at the EU Summit in December 1999 in Helsinki, recognizes Ukraine's long-term aspirations but does not discuss association.

On January 31, 1992, Ukraine joined the then-Conference on Security and Cooperation in Europe (now the Organization for Security and Cooperation in Europe—OSCE), and on March 10, 1992, it became a member of the North Atlantic Cooperation Council. Ukraine also has a close relationship with NATO and has declared interest in eventual membership. It is the most active member of the Partnership for Peace (PfP). Former President Viktor Yushchenko indicated that he supports Ukraine joining the EU in the future. Plans for Ukrainian membership to NATO were shelved by Ukraine following the 2010 Ukrainian presidential election in which Viktor Yanukovych was elected President.

Yanukovych opted to keep Ukraine a non-aligned state. This materialized on June 3, 2010, when the Ukrainian parliament (Verkhovna Rada) excluded, with 226 votes, the goal of "integration into Euro-Atlantic security and NATO membership" from the country's national security strategy giving the country a non-aligned status. "European integration" has remained part of Ukraine's national security strategy and co-operation with NATO was not excluded.

Ukraine then considered relations with NATO as a partnership. Ukraine and NATO continued to hold joint seminars and joint tactical and strategical exercises. After February 2014's Yanukovych ouster and the Russian annexation of Crimea, the nation has renewed its drive for NATO membership. On 23 December 2014 the Verkhovna Rada abolished, with 303 votes, Ukraine's non-aligned status.

On July 30, 2014, the US Senate passed a bill that gives Ukraine, Georgia, and Moldova the status of non–NATO allies. Now, in the event of direct military aggression against these countries, the United States can bring its troops into these countries to protect them from external aggression.

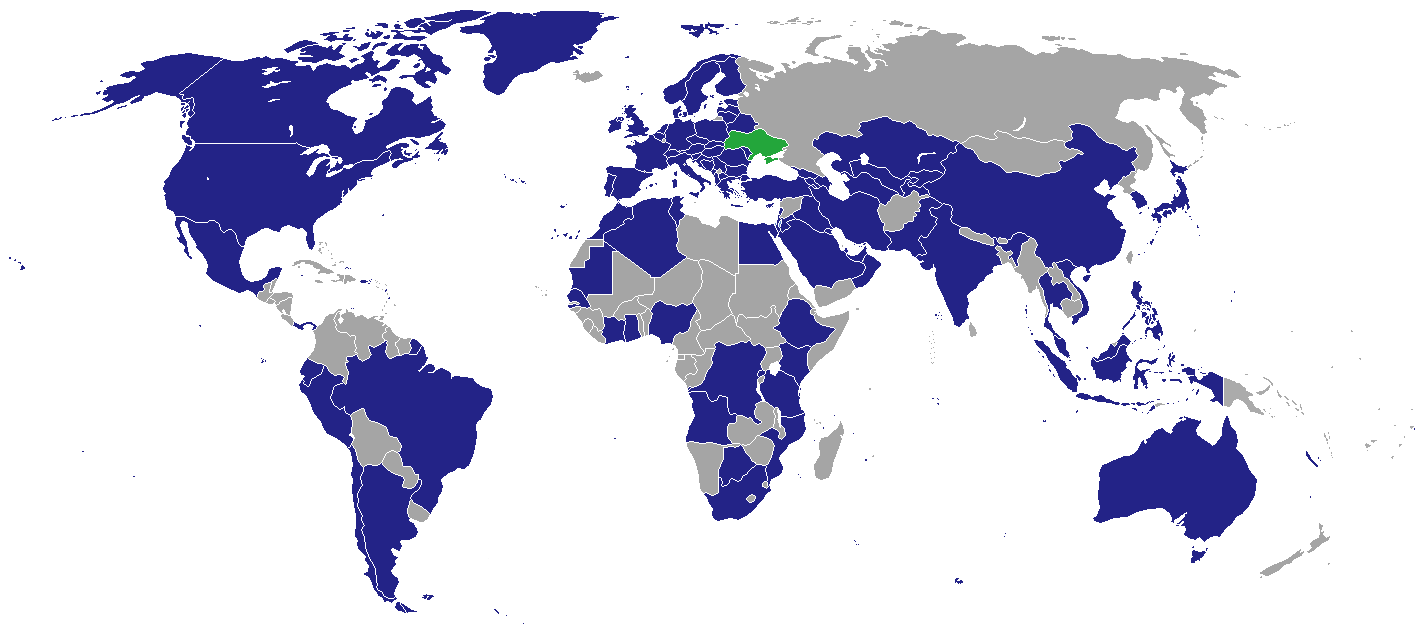
Diplomatic missions of Ukraine

== Bilateral security agreements ==
Long-term bilateral security agreements of Ukraine since 2024. Ukraine Russian Federation (has been invading Ukraine since 2014; full-scale invasion since 24 February 2022) States having signed long-term bilateral security agreements with Ukraine since 2024 (including United States, Canada, Japan, Saudi Arabia, Qatar; not on the map) EU member states indirectly included in the 27 June 2024 long-term bilateral security agreement between the European Union and Ukraine

In early 2024, following the 2022 Russian invasion of Ukraine, several allies of Ukraine signed long-term bilateral security treaties with Ukraine for many years to come (often a period of 10 years). They resulted from a declaration by the G7 countries at a NATO Summit in Washington on 12 July 2023, concluding the establishment of a framework of bilateral security agreements of long-term military, materiel and economic support for Ukraine's defence. The bilateral agreements prioritised strengthening Ukrainian air defence systems, artillery, long-range strike capabilities, armour, and combat aviation to fend off Russian military aggression. By 1 March 2024, 32 countries, as well as the European Union, had signed long-term bilateral security treaties with Ukraine.

- 12 January 2024: The United Kingdom signed a 10-year bilateral security cooperation agreement with Ukraine.
- 16 February 2024: France and Germany signed 10-year bilateral security cooperation agreements with Ukraine.
- 23 February 2024: Denmark signed a 10-year bilateral security cooperation agreement with Ukraine.
- 24 February 2024: Canada and Italy signed 10-year bilateral security cooperation agreements with Ukraine.
- 1 March 2024: The Netherlands signed a 10-year bilateral security cooperation agreement with Ukraine.
- 3 April 2024: Finland signed a 10-year bilateral security cooperation agreement with Ukraine.
- 11 April 2024: Latvia signed a 10-year bilateral security agreement with Ukraine.
- 27 May 2024: Spain signed a 10-year bilateral security cooperation agreement with Ukraine.
- 28 May 2024: Belgium and Portugal signed 10-year bilateral security cooperation agreements with Ukraine.
- 31 May 2024: Sweden, Norway and Iceland signed 10-year bilateral security cooperation agreements with Ukraine.
- 13 June 2024: The United States and Japan signed 10-year bilateral security cooperation agreements with Ukraine.
- 27 June 2024: Estonia, Lithuania and the European Union signed 10-year bilateral security cooperation agreements with Ukraine.
- 8 July 2024: Poland signed a 10-year bilateral security cooperation agreement with Ukraine.
- 10 July 2024: Luxembourg signed a 10-year bilateral security cooperation agreement with Ukraine.
- 11 July 2024: Romania signed a 10-year bilateral security cooperation agreement with Ukraine.
- 18 July 2024: Czech Republic and Slovenia signed 10-year bilateral security cooperation agreements with Ukraine.
- 4 September 2024: Ireland signed a 10-year bilateral security cooperation agreement with Ukraine.
- 9 October 2024: Croatia signed a 10-year bilateral security cooperation agreement with Ukraine.
- 17 October 2024: Greece signed a 10-year bilateral security and defense cooperation agreement with Ukraine, on the sidelines of the European Council in Brussels.
- 16 January 2025: The United Kingdom signed a 100-year bilateral security cooperation agreement with Ukraine.
- 21 January 2025: Albania signed a 10-year bilateral security cooperation agreement with Ukraine.
- 15 May 2025: Montenegro signed a 10-year bilateral security cooperation agreement with Ukraine.
- 27 March 2026: Saudi Arabia signed a 10-year bilateral security cooperation agreement with Ukraine.
- 28 March 2026: Qatar signed a 10-year bilateral security cooperation agreement with Ukraine.
- 30 March 2026: Bulgaria signed a 10-year bilateral security cooperation agreement with Ukraine.

=== Similar agreements and negotiations ===
In March 2024, South Korea and Ukraine began negotiating long-term bilateral security agreements, later that year signing "a five-year framework agreement for USD 2.1 billion to support Ukraine's reconstruction projects".

On 2 May 2025, Ukraine and the Republic of Korea signed an additional memorandum on deeper economic cooperation. In September 2025, Slovakia and Ukraine began talks on a bilateral security agreement.

In May and November 2024, the European Union signed "security and defence partnerships" with six countries, three of which (with Norway, Albania, and North Macedonia), contained an explicit agreement on "(continued long-term) support for Ukraine". The EU–Moldova Security and Defence Partnership of 21 May 2024 does not contain such a stipulation, but it does start by stating that both the EU and Moldova "face an increasingly challenging security environment inter alia due to ongoing Russia's war of aggression against Ukraine."

While Moldova and Ukraine do not have a formal bilateral security agreement (as of January 2026), the two countries have been closely cooperating in their efforts to accede to the European Union, to fend off hybrid Russian threats, or pro-Russian threats from the breakaway region of Transnistria. Increasingly, these take the format of trilateral cooperation between Ukraine, Moldova, and Romania, with the latter serving as a "bridge" to EU (and NATO) membership for the former two. By June 2025, when the three countries announced a "permanent coordination mechanism between the Ministries of Foreign Affairs", the trilateral framework (officially named the Odesa Triangle since August 2025) on issues such as energy and transport infrastructure projects, business, border customs, combating Russian disinformation, and strengthening sanctions against Russia, was described by GMFUS as a "mini-alliance of political and economic cooperation", although agreements on security issues had remained informal so far.

As of 28 March 2026, the United Arab Emirates (UAE) were negotiating a 10-year bilateral security cooperation agreement with Ukraine. At the same time, Ukraine was negotiating long-term security agreements with Jordan and Kuwait, and had fielded "requests from Bahrain and Oman."

== Relations with CIS states ==
Ukraine's relations with Russia had been complicated by energy dependence and by payment arrears. However, relations improved with the 1998 ratification of the bilateral Treaty of Friendship and Cooperation. The two sides have signed a series of agreements on the final division and disposition of the former Soviet Black Sea Fleet that helped to reduce tensions. However, Ukraine cut diplomatic relations with Russia as a response to the Russo-Ukrainian war.

Ukraine became a (non-official) member of the Commonwealth of Independent States (CIS) on December 8, 1991. In January 1993 it refused to endorse a draft charter strengthening political, economic, and defense ties among CIS members, and completely ceased to participate as a member in March 2014. Ukraine was a founding member of GUAM (Georgia-Ukraine-Azerbaijan-Moldova).

In 1999–2001, Ukraine served as a non-permanent member of the UN Security Council. Soviet Ukraine joined the United Nations in 1945 as one of the original members following a Western compromise with the Soviet Union, which had asked for seats for all 15 of its union republics. Ukraine has consistently supported peaceful, negotiated settlements to disputes. It has participated in the quadripartite talks on the conflict in Moldova and promoted a peaceful resolution to conflict in the post-Soviet state of Georgia.

Leonid Derkach (chairman of the SBU, which is Ukraine's security service, successor to the KGB) was fired due to Western pressure after he organized the sale of radar systems to Iraq while such sales were embargoed.

== International disputes ==
=== Belarus ===
The mid 1990s boundary treaty with Belarus remains un-ratified due to unresolved financial claims, stalling demarcation and reducing border security.

=== Russia ===
Delimitation of the land boundary with Russia is incomplete, but the parties have agreed to defer demarcation. The maritime boundary through the Sea of Azov and the Kerch Strait remains unresolved despite a December 2003 framework agreement and ongoing expert-level discussions. Prime Minister Vladimir Putin allegedly declared at a NATO-Russia summit in 2008 that if Ukraine would join NATO his country can contend to annex the Ukrainian East and Crimea. As of April 2024, Russia has annexed the Crimean peninsula and partly four other regions of Ukraine: Donetsk, Luhansk, Kherson and Zaporizhzhia.

Starting in November 2013, the decision by Ukrainian President Viktor Yanukovych to back out of signing an integration agreement with the European Union started a period of civil unrest between Ukrainians who favored integration with the European Union and those who wanted closer ties with Russia. This culminated in the Revolution of Dignity. Russia took advantage of this political instability to annex Crimea in March 2014, though Ukraine still claims sovereignty over the territory by any kind of international law. Russia has also allegedly supported quasi-separatist forces in the war in Donbas. In December 2015 Russian hackers reportedly hacked Ukraine's power grids leading to a blackout and widespread terror.

On 24 February 2022, diplomatic relations were cut with Russia as a response to the 2022 Russian invasion of Ukraine.

=== Moldova ===
Moldova and Ukraine have established joint customs posts to monitor transit through Moldova's break-away Transnistria Region which remains under OSCE supervision.

=== Romania ===
Ukraine and Romania have settled their dispute over the Ukrainian-administered Zmiyinyy (Snake) Island and the Black Sea maritime boundary at the International Court of Justice. The 2010 CIA World Factbook states that "Romania opposes Ukraine's reopening of a navigation canal from the Danube border through Ukraine to the Black Sea".

== Investment promotion ==
State enterprise InvestUkraine was created under the State Agency for Investment and National Projects (National Projects) to serve as a One Stop Shop for investors and to deliver investment consulting services.

== Dual citizenship ==
In June 2025, Ukraine legalized multiple citizenship.

== Relations by country ==
=== Multilateral ===
Organization	Formal relations began	Notes
European Union	December 1991	See Ukraine–European Union relations, Accession of Ukraine to the European Union The Eastern Partnership is meant to complement the Northern Dimension by providing an institutionalized forum for discussing visa agreements, free trade deals and strategic partnership agreements with the EU's eastern neighbours.
United Nations	1945	See Economic Commission of Europe, Organization for Security and Co-operation in Europe
NATO	1991	See Ukraine–NATO relations, Partnership for Peace program, Euro-Atlantic Partnership Council
Commonwealth of Independent States	21 December 1991	See Ukraine–Commonwealth of Independent States relations Ukraine is a signatory of both the Belovezh Accords and Alma-Ata Protocol; however, it has never ratified either agreement and has never been a member of the CIS. Largely ceased to participate in the CIS from 2014, and withdrew representatives from all CIS statutory bodies in 2018 as a result of the Russo-Ukrainian War.

=== Africa ===
Country	Formal relations began	Notes
Algeria	20 August 1992	See Algeria–Ukraine relations: Algeria recognized Ukraine's independence in 1992.; Algeria has an embassy in Kyiv.; Ukraine has an embassy in Algiers (opened in 1999).; Military and trade agreements between the two countries were signed in 1993 and 1994.
Botswana	3 March 2004	Botswana recognized Ukraine's independence on February 11, 1992.
Cape Verde	25 March 1992	Ukraine is represented in Cape-Verde by its embassy in Dakar, Senegal.
CAR	14 September 1995	See Central African Republic–Ukraine relations
Comoros	23 July 1993	Comoros has an honorary consulate in Kyiv.; Ukraine is represented in Comoros by its embassy in Nairobi, Kenya.
Egypt	25 January 1992	See Egypt–Ukraine relations: Since 1993, Egypt has an embassy in Kyiv.; Since 1993, Ukraine has an embassy in Cairo and an honorary consulate in Alexandria.
Guinea	4 April 1992	Ukraine has shown support for military dictatorships in Guinea by supplying the militia of Moussa Dadis Camara.
Guinea-Bissau	12 February 2009	Ukraine is represented in Guinea-Bissau by its embassy in Dakar, Senegal.
Kenya	5 May 1993	See Kenya–Ukraine relations: Kenya is accredited to Ukraine from its embassy in Moscow, Russia.; Ukraine has an embassy in Nairobi.
Malawi	December 22, 1998	Malawi is accredited to Ukraine from its embassy in Berlin, Germany.; Ukraine is accredited to Malawi from its embassy in Nairobi, Kenya.; The presidents of Ukraine and Malawi, Volodymyr Zelenskyy and Lazarus Chakwera, spoke on the phone for the first time ever in the history of bilateral relations on August 4, 2022. Following the 2022 Russian invasion of Ukraine, President Lazarus Chakwera urged Russia to withdraw from Ukraine.
Mauritania	30 September 1992	Mauritania is represented in Ukraine by its embassy in Moscow, Russia.; On 24 May 2024, Ukraine opened its embassy in Mauritania. Until 2024, Ukraine was represented in Mauritania by its embassy in Rabat, Morocco.
South Africa	16 March 1992	See South Africa–Ukraine relations: South Africa established its embassy in Kyiv in October 1992.; Ukraine established its embassy in Pretoria in 1995.
Sudan	4 June 1992	See Sudan-Ukraine relations: Sudan has an embassy in Kyiv.
Tunisia	24 June 1992	Tunisia recognized Ukraine's independence on December 25, 1991.
Uganda	7 September 1994	Uganda is represented in Ukraine by its embassy in Moscow, Russia.; Ukraine is represented in Uganda by its embassy in Nairobi, Kenya.
Zambia	22 April 1993	See Ukraine–Zambia relations: Zambia recognized Ukraine's independence on December 30, 1991.

=== Americas ===
Country	Formal relations began	Notes
Argentina	6 January 1992	See Argentina–Ukraine relations: Argentina has an embassy in Kyiv.; Ukraine has an embassy in Buenos Aires.; A visa-free travel regime between the two countries started operating in October 2011.; List of Treaties ruling relations Argentina and Ukraine (Argentine Foreign Ministry, in Spanish)
Belize	1 October 1999	Belize condemned the 2022 Russian invasion of Ukraine, terming it "illegal" and "unjustified".
Bolivia	8 February 1992	Bolivia abstained from a United Nations General Assembly vote condemning the 2022 Russian invasion of Ukraine.
Brazil	11 February 1992	See Brazil–Ukraine relations: Brazil and Ukraine are strategic partners and cooperate in trade, space technology, education, energy, healthcare, and defense.; Brazil recognized Ukraine's independence on December 26, 1991.; The recent development of a joint space industry has strengthened the bilateral ties between the two countries. Ukraine considers Brazil its key trade partner in Latin America and has been a vocal supporter of the Brazilian bid for a permanent seat at the United Nations Security Council.
Canada	27 January 1992	See Canada–Ukraine relations: Canada opened its embassy in Kyiv in April 1992, and the Embassy of Ukraine in Ottawa opened in October of that same year, paid for mostly by donations from the Ukrainian-Canadian community.; Ukraine opened a consulate-general in Toronto in 1993 and in Edmonton in 2018. Ukraine also has consulates in Halifax, Montreal, Regina, and Vancouver. Canada also has a consulate in Lviv.
Chile		See Chile–Ukraine relations: Chile is accredited to Ukraine from its embassy in Warsaw, Poland.; Ukraine has an embassy in Santiago.
Cuba	12 March 1992	Cuba has an embassy in Kyiv.; Ukraine has an embassy in Havana.
Dominica	25 April 2019	Both countries established diplomatic relations on April 25, 2019.; The two countries also signed a visa waver agreement.
El Salvador	14 April 1999	See El Salvador–Ukraine relations: El Salvador abstained from a United Nations General Assembly vote condemning the 2022 Russian invasion of Ukraine.
Guyana	15 November 2001	Guyana approved a United Nations General Assembly resolution condemning the 2022 Russian invasion of Ukraine.
Honduras	17 September 2002	Honduras abstained from a United Nations General Assembly vote condemning the 2022 Russian invasion of Ukraine.
Mexico	14 January 1992	See Mexico–Ukraine relations: Mexico has an embassy in Kyiv.; Ukraine has an embassy in Mexico City.
Panama	21 May 1993	Panama abstained from a United Nations General Assembly vote condemning the 2022 Russian invasion of Ukraine.
Paraguay	26 February 1993	Paraguay is represented in Ukraine through its embassy in Moscow (Russia).; Ukraine is represented in Paraguay through its embassy in Buenos Aires (Argentina) and an honorary consulate in Asunción.; There is an important community of people of Ukrainian origins in Paraguay (between 10,000 and 15,000 people), most of whom arrived at the beginning of the 20th century. (See also Ukrainians in Paraguay)
Peru	7 May 1992	Main article: Peru–Ukraine relations: Peru is accredited to Ukraine from its embassy in Moscow, Russia.; Ukraine has an embassy in Lima.
United States	3 January 1992	See Ukraine–United States relations: The United States enjoys cordially friendly and strategic relations with Ukraine and attaches great importance to the success of Ukraine's transition to a democratic state with a flourishing free market economy.; The U.S. supported a United Nations General Assembly resolution condemning the 2022 Russian invasion of Ukraine.
Uruguay	18 May 1992	See Ukraine–Uruguay relations: Ukraine is represented in Uruguay through its embassy in Buenos Aires (Argentina).; Uruguay is represented in Ukraine through its embassy in Bucharest (Romania) and through an honorary consulate in Kyiv.; There are around 10,000 people of Ukrainian descent living in Uruguay.
Venezuela	29 September 1993	See Ukraine–Venezuela relations: In 2019, Ukraine recognized Juan Guaidó as President of Venezuela.

=== Asia ===
Country	Formal relations began	Notes
Armenia	25 December 1991	See Armenia–Ukraine relations: Armenian-Ukrainian relations have lasted for centuries and today are cordial.; Armenian communities existed in the medieval Kyivian State as far back as the 12th century. These communities developed into Armenian settlements.; Armenia has an embassy in Kyiv and consulates in Odesa, Kharkiv, Ternopil, and Cherkasy.; Ukraine has an embassy in Yerevan.
Azerbaijan	6 February 1992	See Azerbaijan–Ukraine relations: Azerbaijan plays an important role in the foreign policy of Ukraine due to its strategic role. Both countries are among the founding members of GUAM and after their independence from the Soviet Union, they have remained close. The relations of strategic cooperation, political, economical, and cultural relations between two countries are at a high level.; Azerbaijan has an embassy in Kyiv.; Ukraine has an embassy in Baku.; There are about 32,000 Ukrainians who live in Azerbaijan, and there are over 45,000 Azerbaijanis in Ukraine.; The two countries support each other in entering international organizations.; Ukraine supports the peaceful resolution of the conflict of the Nagorno-Karabakh conflict within the framework of Azerbaijan's territorial integrity and is ready to take part in possible peacekeeping operation under the mandate of the United Nations.
Bahrain	20 July 1992	See Bahrain–Ukraine relations
Bangladesh	24 February 1992	See Bangladesh–Ukraine relations
Brunei	3 October 1997	See Brunei–Ukraine relations
Cambodia	23 April 1992	See Cambodia–Ukraine relations
China	4 January 1992	See China–Ukraine relations: China has an embassy in Kyiv and a consulate-general in Odesa.; Ukraine has an embassy in Beijing and a consulate-general in Shanghai.; Chinese Ukrainian trade relations have intensified since 2008 and are growing; for instance various Chinese companies are interested in investing in the construction of a large orbital road around Kyiv and in building a number of bridges across the Dnipro River. China intends to provide a loan of 25 million yuan (about USD 3.7 million) to Ukraine.; Ukraine has also begun providing China with jet engines for military aircraft.
Georgia	22 July 1992	See Georgia–Ukraine relations Since their independence from the Soviet Union, both countries consider each other as strategic partners and have forged close political and cultural relations. During the Shevardnadze era, the Georgian government maintained its close relations with Ukraine. In April 1993, Georgia and Ukraine signed 20 documents, including a treaty on friendship and cooperation. However, the relationship has further enhanced after Rose Revolution in Georgia and Orange Revolution in Ukraine. During the Orange Revolutions, many Georgians rallied in Kyiv in support of Viktor Yushchenko. Both countries maintain pro-western political orientation and aspire to join NATO and the European Union. The close friendship between Presidents Mikheil Saakashvili and Viktor Yushchenko has also played an important role in recent political and cultural unity of the two countries. However, the cultural and political unity between two nations existed long ago. There are many cultural events in both courtiers, celebrating close relations between Georgian and Ukrainian people. In 2007, Georgians unveiled a statue to Taras Shevchenko in Tbilisi while Ukrainians erected the statue of Georgia's epic poet Shota Rustaveli in Kyiv.
India	17 January 1992	See India–Ukraine relations: The Indian Embassy in Kyiv was opened in May 1992 and Ukraine opened its Mission in New Delhi in February 1993. The Consulate General of India in Odesa functioned from 1962 till its closure in March 1999.
Indonesia	11 June 1992	See Indonesia–Ukraine relations: Indonesia has an embassy in Kyiv.; Ukraine has an embassy in Jakarta.
Iran	22 January 1992	See Iran–Ukraine relations: Iran has an embassy in Kyiv.; Ukraine has an embassy in Tehran.
Iraq	16 December 1992	See Iraq–Ukraine relations: Ukraine has an embassy in Baghdad and Iraq has an embassy in Kyiv.; A small contingent of Ukrainians operated in Iraq in the wake of the invasion of Iraq mainly concerning police work and reconstruction.
Israel	26 December 1991	See Israel–Ukraine relations: Israel has an embassy in Kyiv.; Ukraine has an embassy in Tel Aviv and a consulate-general in Haifa.
Japan	26 January 1992	See Japan–Ukraine relations: Japan extended recognition to the Ukrainian state on December 28, 1991, immediately after the breakup of the Soviet Union.; Ukraine maintains an embassy in Tokyo.; Japan maintains an embassy in Kyiv.
Kazakhstan	23 July 1992	See Kazakhstan–Ukraine relations: Kazakhstan has an embassy in Kyiv and an honorary consulate in Odesa.; Ukraine has an embassy in Astana and a consulate-general in Almaty.
Lebanon	14 December 1992	See Lebanon–Ukraine relations: Lebanon has an embassy in Kyiv.; Ukraine has an embassy in Beirut.
Malaysia	3 March 1992	See Malaysia–Ukraine relations: Malaysia recognized independent Ukraine on 31 December 1991, 5 days after Dissolution of the Soviet Union.; Malaysia has an embassy in Kyiv.; Since August 2002, Ukraine has an embassy in Kuala Lumpur.
Myanmar	19 January 1999	See Myanmar–Ukraine relations
North Korea	Diplomatic relations severed 13 July 2022	Main article: North Korea–Ukraine relations: North Korea recognised independent Ukraine on 9 January 1992.; Ukraine has been shown to have sold rocket engines used for missiles to North Korea.; Ukraine cut diplomatic ties with North Korea on 13 July 2022 after North Korea recognized the independence of the eastern regions of Luhansk and Donetsk, and has since withdrew the recognition of North Korea as they referred "Korea" as the Republic of Korea on the list of foreign diplomatic missions listed on Ukrainian MFA website.
Pakistan	16 March 1992	See Pakistan–Ukraine relations: Pakistan recognized Ukraine's independence in 1991.; Pakistan has an embassy in Kyiv.; Ukraine has an embassy in Islamabad.; Ukraine and Pakistan have been cooperating with each other in educational sector as well as cultural exchanges. Pakistan and Ukraine are also heavily cooperating with each other in aerospace engineering, aerospace technologies, bio-medical sciences and science and technology.
Palestine	2 November 2001	See Palestine–Ukraine relations
Philippines	7 April 1992	See Philippines–Ukraine relations: The Philippines recognized Ukraine's independence on 22 January 1992.; The Philippines is represented in Ukraine through its embassy in Moscow (Russia).; Ukraine is represented in the Philippines through its embassy in Kuala Lumpur (Malaysia).; Ukraine will open an embassy in Manila in 2024.
Saudi Arabia	14 April 1993	See Saudi Arabia–Ukraine relations: Saudi Arabia recognized Ukraine's independence in 1992.; Saudi Arabia has an embassy in Kyiv.; Ukraine has an embassy in Riyadh and an honorary consulate in Jeddah.; In January 2003, Ukrainian President Leonid Kuchma made an official visit to Saudi Arabia.
Singapore	31 March 1992	See Singapore–Ukraine relations: Singapore recognized Ukraine's independence on January 2, 1992.; Singapore is represented in Ukraine through its embassy in Moscow (Russia).; Since December 2002, Ukraine has an embassy and an honorary consulate in Singapore.; In 2007, the two countries commenced negotiations for a free trade agreement. In 2006, Ukraine was Singapore's 55th largest trading partner last year, with total trade amounting to S$774 million; In 2007, the two countries signed a double taxation agreement.
South Korea	10 February 1992	See South Korea–Ukraine relations Despite Korea changing the spelling of the Russian pronunciation of Kiev to Kiyu at the request of the Ukrainian government and providing various types of non-lethal weapons and humanitarian reconstruction funds on several occasions, it is causing concern among Koreans by labeling the East Sea, which is Korea's sea, as the Sea of Japan and Dokdo as a Japanese island, and by the visit of the Ukrainian ambassador to Japan to the Yasukuni Shrine.
Syria	31 March 1992	Syria recognised independent Ukraine on 28 December 1991 and established relations since March 31, 1992.; Relations were positive until 2011, but have been on pause since then.; Ukraine had an embassy in Damascus before it was closed in 2016.; Ukraine cut diplomatic ties with Syria on 29 June 2022 after Syria recognized the independence of the eastern regions of Luhansk and Donetsk.; After the fall of the Assad regime, on 30 December 2024, Ukraine and Syria moved to reestablish the partnership and diplomatic relations between countries.; Ties were formally restored on 24 September 2025.
Taiwan	No official relations De facto relations	See Taiwan–Ukraine relations: After the fall of the Soviet Union, Taiwan tried to establish diplomatic relationships with Ukraine before China but ultimately failed after two diplomatic visits by Vice Minister of Foreign Affairs Chiang Hsiao-yen.; During the 2022 Russian invasion of Ukraine, Taiwan sent 27 tons of humanitarian aid to Ukraine.
Thailand	6 May 1992	See Thailand–Ukraine relations: Thailand is represented in Ukraine through its consulate in Kyiv.; Ukraine has an embassy and an honorary consulate in Bangkok.
Turkey	3 February 1992	See Turkey–Ukraine relations Turkey and Ukraine have a long chronology of historical, geographic, and cultural contact. Diplomatic relations between both countries were established in the early 1990s when Turkey became one of the first states in the world to announce officially their recognition of sovereign Ukraine.: Turkey has an embassy in Kyiv and a consulate general in Odesa.; Ukraine has an embassy in Ankara, a consulate general in Istanbul and a consulate in Antalya.
United Arab Emirates	15 October 1992	Ukraine has an embassy in Abu Dhabi and a consulate in Dubai.; United Arab Emirates has an embassy in Kyiv.
Uzbekistan	25 August 1992	See Ukraine–Uzbekistan relations
Vietnam	23 January 1992	See Ukraine–Vietnam relations: Ukraine has an embassy in Hanoi.; Vietnam has an embassy in Kyiv.

=== Europe ===
Ukraine and all UN member states in Europe, except Belarus and Kazakhstan, are members of the Council of Europe.

Country	Formal relations began	Notes
Albania	13 January 1993	See Albania–Ukraine relations
Andorra	19 April 1996	See Andorra–Ukraine relations
Austria	24 January 1992	See Austria–Ukraine relations: Ukraine includes a great deal of territory (some later part of Poland or Czechoslovakia before 1939) that used to be part of the Austro-Hungarian Empire: Lviv Oblast, Ivano-Frankivsk Oblast, Ternopil Oblast, most of the Chernivtsi Oblast, and the Zakarpattia Oblast.; Austria has an embassy in Kyiv and 3 honorary consulates (in Donetsk, Kharkiv and Lviv).; Ukraine has an embassy in Vienna and two honorary consulates (in Klagenfurt and Salzburg).
Belarus	27 December 1991	See Belarus–Ukraine relations: The two countries share 891 km of border.; Belarus has an embassy in Kyiv and an honorary consulate in Lviv.; Ukraine has an embassy in Minsk and a general consulate in Brest.; Both countries are full members of the Baku Initiative and Central European Initiative.
Belgium	10 March 1992	See Belgium–Ukraine relations: Belgium has an embassy in Kyiv; Ukraine has an embassy in Brussels and two honorary consulates (in Antwerp and Mons).; Although politically the two nations are not closely connected, they have a long history of economic integration and trade, with Belgian investment playing a role in the contemporary Ukrainian economy. As of 2008, trade revenue generated between the two nations accounted for approximately USD1 billion.
Bosnia and Herzegovina	30 January 1993	Bosnia and Herzegovina is represented in Ukraine through its embassy in Budapest (Hungary) and an honorary consulate in Kyiv.; Ukraine has an embassy in Sarajevo.; In May 2026, the two countries agreed to establish the Ukraine–Bosnia and Herzegovina transport visa-free regime for freight transport.
Bulgaria	13 December 1991	See Bulgaria–Ukraine relations: Both countries established diplomatic relations in 1992. Bulgaria has an embassy in Kyiv and a consulate-general in Odesa.; Ukraine has an embassy in Sofia and a consulate-general in Varna.
Croatia	18 February 1992	See Croatia–Ukraine relations: Croatia has an embassy in Kyiv.; Ukraine has an embassy in Zagreb.
Cyprus	19 February 1992	See Cyprus–Ukraine relations: The Cypriot embassy in Berlin (Germany) is also accredited as a non-resident embassy to Ukraine. Cyprus also has two honorary consulates (in Kyiv and in Mariupol).; Ukraine has an embassy in Nicosia and an honorary consulate in Limassol.
Czech Republic	18 February 1992	See Czech Republic–Ukraine relations: The Czech Republic has an embassy in Kyiv.; Ukraine has an embassy in Prague.
Denmark	12 February 1992	See Denmark–Ukraine relations: Denmark has an embassy in Kyiv.; Ukraine has an embassy in Copenhagen.
Estonia	4 January 1992	See Estonia–Ukraine relations: Estonia has an embassy in Kyiv.; Ukraine has an embassy in Tallinn.
Finland	26 February 1992	See Finland–Ukraine relations: Finland has an embassy in Kyiv.; Ukraine has an embassy in Helsinki.
France	24 January 1992	See France–Ukraine relations: France has an embassy in Kyiv.; Ukraine has an embassy in Paris.; Since 2006, Ukraine has been an observer in the Francophonie organisation.
Germany	17 January 1992	See Germany–Ukraine relations: Germany has an embassy in Kyiv.; Ukraine has an embassy in Berlin and three Consulates-General (in Frankfurt, Hamburg and Munich).
Greece	15 January 1992	See Greece–Ukraine relations: Greece has an embassy in Kyiv and two consulates-general (in Mariupol and Odesa).; Ukraine has an embassy in Athens and a consulate-general in Thessaloniki.
Holy See	8 February 1992	See Holy See–Ukraine relations
Hungary	3 December 1991	See Hungary–Ukraine relations: Hungary has an embassy in Kyiv, a consulate-general in Uzhhorod, and a consulate in Berehove.; Ukraine has an embassy in Budapest and a consulate-general in Nyíregyháza.
Iceland	30 March 1992	Iceland is represented in Ukraine through its embassy in Warsaw (Poland).; Ukraine is represented in Iceland through its embassy in Helsinki (Finland) and through an honorary consulate in Reykjavík.
Ichkeria	18 October 2022	Ukraine recognised the Chechen Republic of Ichkeria in 2022. Prior to the state's recognition, the Separate Special Purpose Battalion was created by Akhmed Zakayev on July 29 of the same year.
Ireland	1 April 1992	See Ireland–Ukraine relations: Ireland recognized the Ukrainian state in 1991.; Ireland has an embassy in Kyiv.; Ukraine has an embassy in Dublin.; There are 3,343 Ukrainians living in Ireland.
Italy	29 January 1992	See Italy–Ukraine relations: Italy has an embassy in Kyiv.; Ukraine has an embassy in Rome, a general consulate in Milan and 4 honorary consulates (in Bari, Florence, Genoa, Naples, Padua and Reggio Calabria).; There are around 120,000 people of Ukrainian descent living in Italy.
Latvia	12 February 1992	See Latvia–Ukraine relations: Latvia has an embassy in Kyiv and 2 honorary consulates (in Lviv and Odesa).; Ukraine has an embassy in Riga and an honorary consulate in Ventspils.; There are around 92,000 Ethnic Ukrainians living in Latvia.
Liechtenstein	6 February 1992	See Liechtenstein-Ukraine relations: Liechtenstein is represented through Switzerland in its embassy in Kyiv.; Ukraine is represented through Switzerland in the Embassy of Ukraine, Bern.
Lithuania	12 December 1991	See Lithuania–Ukraine relations Gitanas Nausėda meets Volodymyr Zelenskyy during the Russo-Ukrainian war: Much of the current territory of Ukraine was part of the Polish–Lithuanian Commonwealth prior to the partitions of Poland ending in 1795.; Lithuania has an embassy in Kyiv and an honorary consulates in Lviv.; Ukraine has an embassy in Vilnius and three honorary consulates (in Klaipėda, Šalčininkai and Visaginas).; Both countries are full members of the Council of Europe.; Lithuania fully supports Ukraine's membership in the European Union and NATO.; There are around 44,000 ethnic Ukrainians living in Lithuania and around 11,000 ethnic Lithuanians living in Ukraine.; Lithuanian Ministry of Foreign affairs: list of bilateral treaties with Ukraine (in Lithuanian only)
Luxembourg	1 July 1992	See Luxembourg–Ukraine relations
Malta	5 March 1992	See Malta–Ukraine relations: The Maltese embassy in Moscow (Russia) is also accredited as a non-resident embassy to Ukraine.; Ukraine is represented in Malta through its embassy in Rome (Italy).
Moldova	27 December 1991	See Moldova–Ukraine relations: Ukraine opened an embassy in Chișinău and a consulate in Bălți in 2005. The Ukrainian ambassador in Chișinău is Serhiy Pirozhkov.; The border between Moldova and Ukraine is 985 kilometers.; Ukrainians are the second largest ethnicity group in Moldova after ethnic Moldavians. There are 442,346 Ukrainians in Moldova, which represents 11.2% of the population. Moldavians are the fourth ethnic minority in Ukraine.; As of the 2001 Ukrainian Census, there were 258,600 Moldavians in Ukraine – which represents 0,5% of the Ukrainian population. For 70.0% of Moldavian speaking Ukrainians, Russian (17.6%) and Ukrainian (10.7%) are the native languages.
Monaco	26 July 2007	
Montenegro	22 August 2006	See Montenegro–Ukraine relations: Ukraine recognized the Republic of Montenegro on June 15, 2006. Both countries established diplomatic relations on August 22, 2006.; The Ukrainian embassy in Belgrade (Serbia) is accredited as a non resident embassy to Montenegro.; In 2008, both countries indicated an intent to open resident embassies.
Netherlands	1 April 1992	See Netherlands–Ukraine relations: The Netherlands has an embassy in Kyiv and a consulate in Lviv.; Ukraine has an embassy in The Hague.
North Macedonia	20 April 1995	See North Macedonia–Ukraine relations: North Macedonia has an embassy in Kyiv.; Ukraine has an embassy in Skopje.
Norway	5 February 1992	See Norway–Ukraine relations: Norway recognized Ukraine's independence in 1991.; Norway has an embassy in Kyiv.; Ukraine has an embassy and an honorary consulate in Oslo.
Poland	4 January 1992	See Poland–Ukraine relations: Poland was the first country in the world to recognize Ukrainian independence. The relations have been improving since, with Poland and Ukraine forming a strong strategic partnership. Various controversies from their shared history occasionally resurface in Polish–Ukrainian relations, but they do not have a major influence on the bilateral relations of Poland and Ukraine.; Both countries share a border of about 529 km. Poland's acceptance of the Schengen Agreement created problems with the Ukrainian border traffic. On July 1, 2009, an agreement on local border traffic between the two country's came into effect. This agreement enables Ukrainian citizens living in border regions to cross the Polish frontier according to a liberalized procedure.
Portugal	27 January 1992	See Portugal–Ukraine relations: Portugal recognized Ukraine's independence in 1991.; Portugal has an embassy in Kyiv.; Ukraine has an embassy and an honorary consulate in Lisbon and a consulate in Porto.; There are between 40,000 and 150,000 Ukrainians living in Portugal.
Romania	1 February 1992	See Romania–Ukraine relations: Romania has an embassy in Kyiv and 2 Consulates-General (in Chernivtsi and Odesa).; Ukraine has an embassy in Bucharest and a consulate in Suceava.
Russia	Diplomatic relations severed 24 February 2022	See Russia–Ukraine relations Established relations on February 14, 1992, Russia formerly had an embassy in Kyiv and consulates in Kharkiv, Lviv, Odesa and Simferopol. Ukraine had an embassy in Moscow and consulates in Rostov-on-Don, Saint Petersburg, Tyumen and Vladivostok. Relations between the two country's governments have been unfriendly since the presidency of Leonid Kuchma expired. Russian Prime Minister Vladimir Putin allegedly declared at a NATO–Russia summit in 2008 that if Ukraine would join NATO his country could contend to annex the Ukrainian East and Crimea. Some analysts believe that the current Russian leadership is determined to prevent a Russian equivalent of the Ukrainian Orange Revolution in Russia. This mindset is supposed to explain not only Russian domestic policy but its sensitivity over events abroad as well. Many in Ukraine and beyond believe that Russia has periodically used its vast energy resources to bully its smaller, dependent neighbour, but the Russian Government argues instead that it is internal squabbling amongst Ukraine's political elite that is to blame for the deadlock. Later, Putin stated that the government of the Russian Federation respects the sovereignty of Ukraine, while several Russian parliamentarians as well some governors were urging the liquidation of Ukraine. Starting in November 2013, the decision by Ukrainian President Viktor Yanukovych to back out of signing an integration agreement with the European Union started a period of civil unrest between Ukrainians who favored integration with the European Union and those who wanted closer ties with Russia, culminating in the Revolution of Dignity. Russia took advantage of this political instability to annex Crimea in March 2014, though Ukraine still claims sovereignty over the territory. Russia has also allegedly supported separatist forces in the war in Donbas. In December 2015, Russian hackers reportedly hacked Ukraine's power grids leading to a blackout and widespread terror. On 24 February 2022, Russia launched the 2022 Russian invasion of Ukraine, which prompted Ukraine to break diplomatic ties with the country.
San Marino	24 March 1995	See San Marino–Ukraine relations
Serbia	15 April 1994	See Serbia–Ukraine relations: Serbia recognized Ukraine in December 1991 by the decision on the recognition of the former republics of the Soviet Union.; Ukraine has an embassy in Belgrade.; Serbia has an embassy in Kyiv.
Slovakia	30 January 1993	See Slovakia–Ukraine relations: Slovakia has an embassy in Kyiv, a general consulate in Uzhhorod, and two honorary consulates (in Donetsk and Uzhhorod).; Ukraine has an embassy in Bratislava and a general consulate in Prešov.; The countries share 90 km of border.; There are between 40,000 and 100,000 people of Ukrainian descent living in Slovakia.; During the Interwar era the Ukrainian province Zakarpattia Oblast was part of Czechoslovakia.
Slovenia	10 March 1992	See Slovenia–Ukraine relations: Slovenia has an embassy in Kyiv and two honorary consulates (in Kharkiv and Lviv).; Ukraine has an embassy in Ljubljana.; Both countries are full members of the Organization for Security and Co-operation in Europe.
Spain	30 January 1992	See Spain–Ukraine relations: Spain recognized Ukraine's independence in 1991.; Spain has an embassy in Kyiv.; Ukraine has an embassy in Madrid and a consulate-general in Barcelona and a consulate in Málaga.
Sweden	13 January 1992	See Sweden–Ukraine relations: Sweden has an embassy in Kyiv and an honorary consulate in Kakhovka.; Ukraine has an embassy in Stockholm.
Switzerland	6 February 1992	See Switzerland–Ukraine relations: Contact between Switzerland and Ukraine goes back to Tsarist times.; Switzerland recognized Ukraine in 1991 and immediately opened an embassy in Kyiv.; Ukraine has an embassy in Bern.
United Kingdom	10 January 1992	See Ukraine–United Kingdom relations British Prime Minister Keir Starmer with Ukrainian President Volodymyr Zelenskyy in Kyiv, January 2025. Ukraine established diplomatic relations with the United Kingdom on 10 January 1992.: Ukraine maintains an embassy in London, and a consulate in Edinburgh.; The United Kingdom is accredited to Ukraine through its embassy in Kyiv.; Both countries share common membership of the Council of Europe, the European Court of Human Rights, the OSCE, a Trilateral Security Pact, the United Nations, and the World Trade Organization. Bilaterally the two countries have a Development Partnership, a Digital Trade Agreement, a Double Tax Convention, a Security Agreement, and a Political, Free Trade and Strategic Partnership Agreement.

=== Oceania ===
Country	Formal relations began	Notes
Australia	10 January 1992	See Australia–Ukraine relations: Relations with Australia are currently modest but increasing.; Australia and Ukraine have one bilateral treaty on agreement and economical cooperation, signed in March 1998.; Ukraine opened an embassy in Canberra in March 2003.; Australia has an embassy in Kyiv.
Micronesia	17 September 1999	Relations only grew stronger following the 2022 Russian Invasion of Ukraine. The Federated States of Micronesia severed diplomatic relations with Russia on 25 February 2022. "The FSM affirms its stalwart support of the North Atlantic Treaty Organization and the United Nations, who correctly condemn the Russian invasion of Ukraine. The FSM supports the removal of the Russian Federation in its capacity as president of the United Nations Security Council; Russia remaining there is a façade, as they need to be upholding the international rules-based order instead of undermining it."
New Zealand	3 March 1992	See New Zealand–Ukraine relations: New Zealand recognized Ukraine as an independent state on 27 February 1992.; Since 2015, the New Zealand Embassy in Warsaw (Poland) has been accredited to act as New Zealand's embassy to Ukraine. Since October 2008, the honorary consulate of New Zealand operates in Kyiv. In December 2007, the Embassy of Ukraine in Australia was accredited to act as Ukraine's embassy for New Zealand.; In April 2006, New Zealand's Minister for Foreign Affairs paid an official visit to Ukraine.
Solomon Islands	27 September 2011	Ukraine is represented in the Solomon Islands by its embassy in Canberra, Australia.
Vanuatu	29 September 1999	Ukraine is represented in Vanuatu by its embassy in Canberra, Australia.

== Regional blocs ==
Bloc	Countries
Lublin Triangle	Ukraine • Poland • Lithuania
Association Trio	Ukraine • Georgia • Moldova
British–Polish–Ukrainian trilateral pact	Ukraine • Poland • United Kingdom

=== Carpathian Eight ===
On 18 September 2026, Ukrainian President Volodymyr Zelenskyy announced the creation of the Carpathian Eight (C8), a regional cooperation format involving Austria, the Czech Republic, Hungary, Poland, Romania, Serbia, Slovakia and Ukraine. The initiative was presented as a framework for cooperation in trade, transport, energy and security. The first summit was held in Bukovel, Ukraine, with several heads of government in attendance, alongside the EU. However, on 21 September 2026, Hungarian prime minister Péter Magyar denied that Hungary was part of the bloc, saying that the country had received an invitation but did not accept.

== See also ==
- 5+2 format, negotiations (2005–2022) on the Transnistria conflict between Ukraine, Transnistria, Moldova, Russia, the OSCE, the European Union, and the United States
- Foreign policy of Ukraine
- List of diplomatic missions in Ukraine
- List of diplomatic missions of Ukraine
- Ukraine–Bosnia and Herzegovina transport visa-free regime
- Ukraine–United Kingdom Political, Free Trade and Strategic Partnership Agreement
