= Embassy of Ukraine, Nicosia =

Embassy of Ukraine to the Republic of Cyprus

Embassy of Ukraine to the Republic of Cyprus in Nicosia
- Location: Nicosia, Cyprus
- Address: 10 Engomi, 2415 A.Miaouli Str., 10, Nicosia, Cyprus
- Ambassador: Ruslan Nimchynskyi since 2020
- Website: Official Website

The Embassy of Ukraine in Nicosia is the diplomatic mission of Ukraine in Nicosia, Cyprus.

== History of the diplomatic relations ==
The Republic of Cyprus recognized the independence of Ukraine on December 27, 1991. Diplomatic relations between Ukraine and the Republic of Cyprus were established on February 19, 1992, by signing of the relevant Protocol between two countries in New York. The General Consulate of Ukraine was opened in Nicosia, in August 1999, and in June 2003 the Embassy of Ukraine to the Republic of Cyprus began its functioning.

== Heads of diplomatic missions ==
1. Dmytro Markow (1999–2002)
2. Borys Humenjuk (2003–2007)
3. Oleksandr Demjanjuk (2007–2012)
4. Borys Humenjuk (2012–2019)
5. Natalija Sirenko (2019–2020)
6. Ruslan Nimtschynskyj (2020–)

== See also ==
- Cyprus–Ukraine relations
- List of diplomatic missions in Cyprus
- Foreign relations of Cyprus
- Foreign relations of Ukraine
