= Vsevolod Chentsov =

Ukrainian diplomat

- Всеволод Ченцов
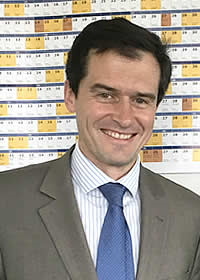
- Chentsov in 2017

Deputy Prime Minister for European and Euro-Atlantic Integration
- Incumbent
- Assumed office 16 July 2026
- President: Volodymyr Zelenskyy
- Prime Minister: Serhii Koretskyi

Head of the Mission of Ukraine to the European Union and the European Atomic Energy Community
- In office 25 August 2021 – 16 July 2026
- President: Volodymyr Zelenskyy
- Prime Minister: Denys Shmyhal

Ambassador of Ukraine to the Netherlands and to the Organisation on Prohibition of the Chemical Weapons
- In office 2017–2021
- President: Petro Poroshenko
- Prime Minister: Volodymyr Groysman
- Preceded by: Oleksandr Horin

Personal details
- Born: 10 April 1974 (age 52) Lviv, Ukrainian SSR, Soviet Union
- Education: Lviv University

Vsevolod Valeriiovych Chentsov (Ukrainian: Всеволод Валерійович Ченцов; born 10 April 1974) is a Ukrainian politician and diplomat who serves as Deputy Prime Minister for European and Euro-Atlantic Integration in the Koretskyi Government since 16 July 2026.

Chentsov began working in the Ministry of Foreign Affairs of Ukraine in 1996. He worked in the Ukrainian missions in Turkey and Poland, and the Mission of Ukraine to the European Union, before becoming director of the EU department of Ministry of Foreign Affairs of Ukraine. He was Ukraine's ambassador to the Netherlands from March 2017 to 2021. He then served as the head of mission of Ukraine to the European Union.
