= Oleksandr Horin =

Ukrainian politician and diplomat

Oleksandr Horin Олександр Горін
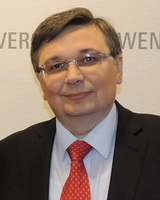
- Horin in 2020

Ambassador of Ukraine to Netherlands
- In office 2011–2017
- Prime Minister: Volodymyr Groysman
- Preceded by: Vasyl Korzachenko
- Succeeded by: Vsevolod Chentsov
- President: Petro Poroshenko

Personal details
- Born: 11 November 1956 (age 69) Donetsk, Ukrainian SSR
- Education: Kyiv University

Oleksandr Horin (Ukrainian: Олександр Олегович Горін; born 11 November 1956) is a Ukrainian diplomat, who served as the Deputy Minister of Foreign Affairs of Ukraine (in 2008) and the Ukraine's ambassador to the Netherlands from March 2011 until March 2017 (a post he combined with being the permanent representative of Ukraine in the Organisation for the Prohibition of Chemical Weapons).

Horin has a wife and two children.
