= Embassy of Algeria, Kyiv =

Embassy of Algeria in Kyiv
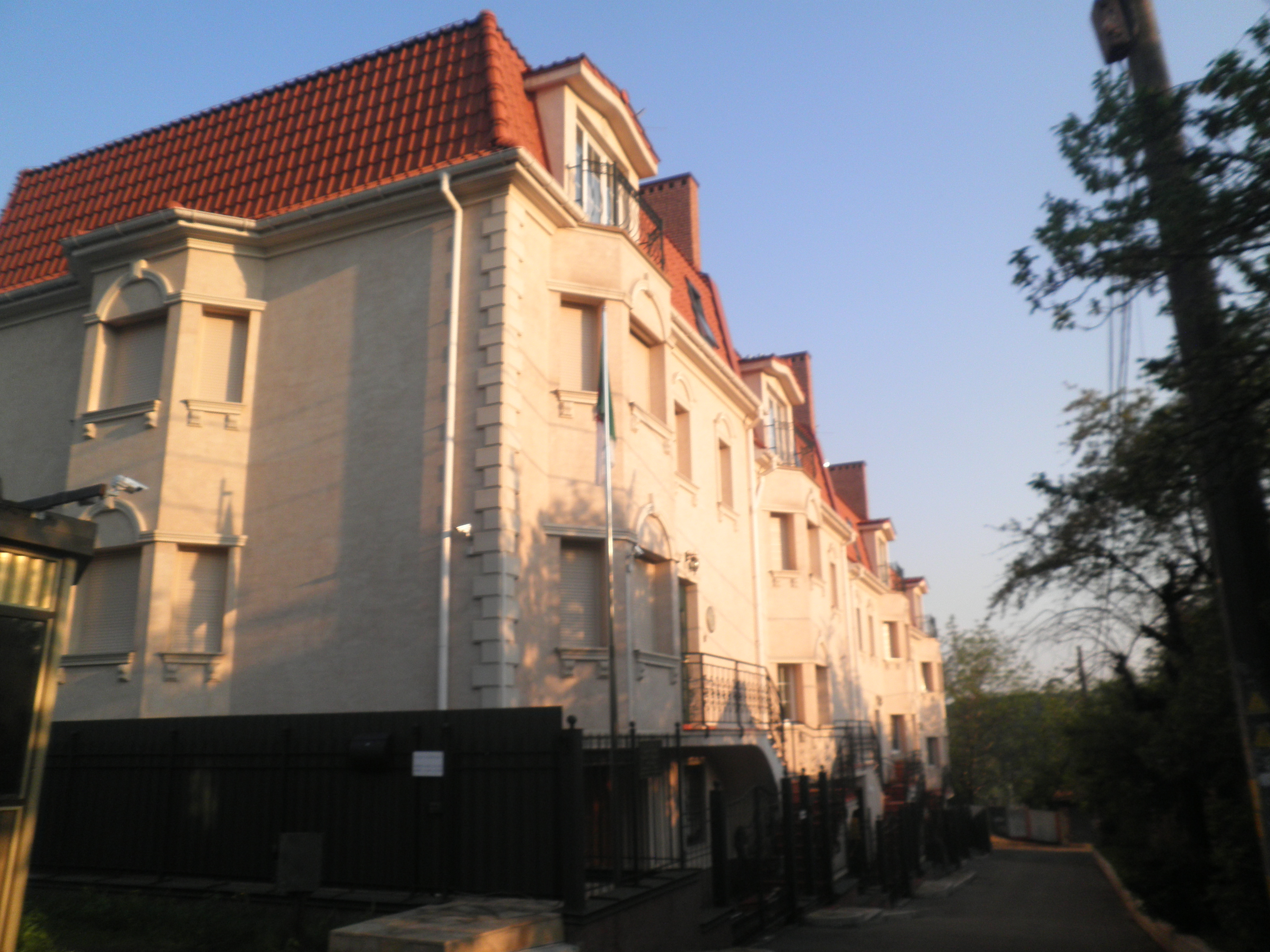
- Location: Kyiv
- Address: 76A, Zvirynetska Street, 01014, Kyiv
- Coordinates: 50.4040°N 30.5561°E
- Ambassador: Hocine Boussouara

The Embassy of Algeria in Kyiv is the diplomatic mission of Algeria in Ukraine, and its accreditation in Moldova.

== History ==
The People's Democratic Republic of Algeria recognized independence of Ukraine on December 27, 1991. On August 29, 1992, diplomatic relations between the two countries were established. In November 1992, the first Ambassador of Algeria Belramul Kamerzerman presented his credentials to the President of Ukraine Leonid Kravchuk. Algeria has an embassy in Kyiv and Ukraine has an embassy in Algiers (opened in 1999).

The embassy was temporarily closed on 6 March 2022 as a result of the 2022 Russian invasion of Ukraine, reopening in February 2023.

== List of Ambassadors ==
- Belramul Kamerzerman (1992-1997)
- Cherif Chikhi (1997-2004),
- Mokaddem Bafdal (2004-2010)
- Mohammed Bashir Mazzuz (2010-2015)
- Hocine Boussouara (2015–2026)
- Ahmed Ouail (2026 -present)

== See also ==
- Algeria-Ukraine relations
- Foreign relations of Algeria
- Foreign relations of Ukraine
- Diplomatic missions in Ukraine
- Diplomatic missions of Algeria
