= Indonesia–Ukraine relations =

- Indonesia: Ukraine

Indonesia and Ukraine established diplomatic relations in 1992. Indonesia has an embassy in Kyiv that is also accredited for Georgia and Armenia, while Ukraine has an embassy in Jakarta. Both nations have agreed to expand cooperation in heavy industries, military, space technology and exploration, tourism, sports, economy and trade sectors, as well as cooperation within international organizations.

== History ==
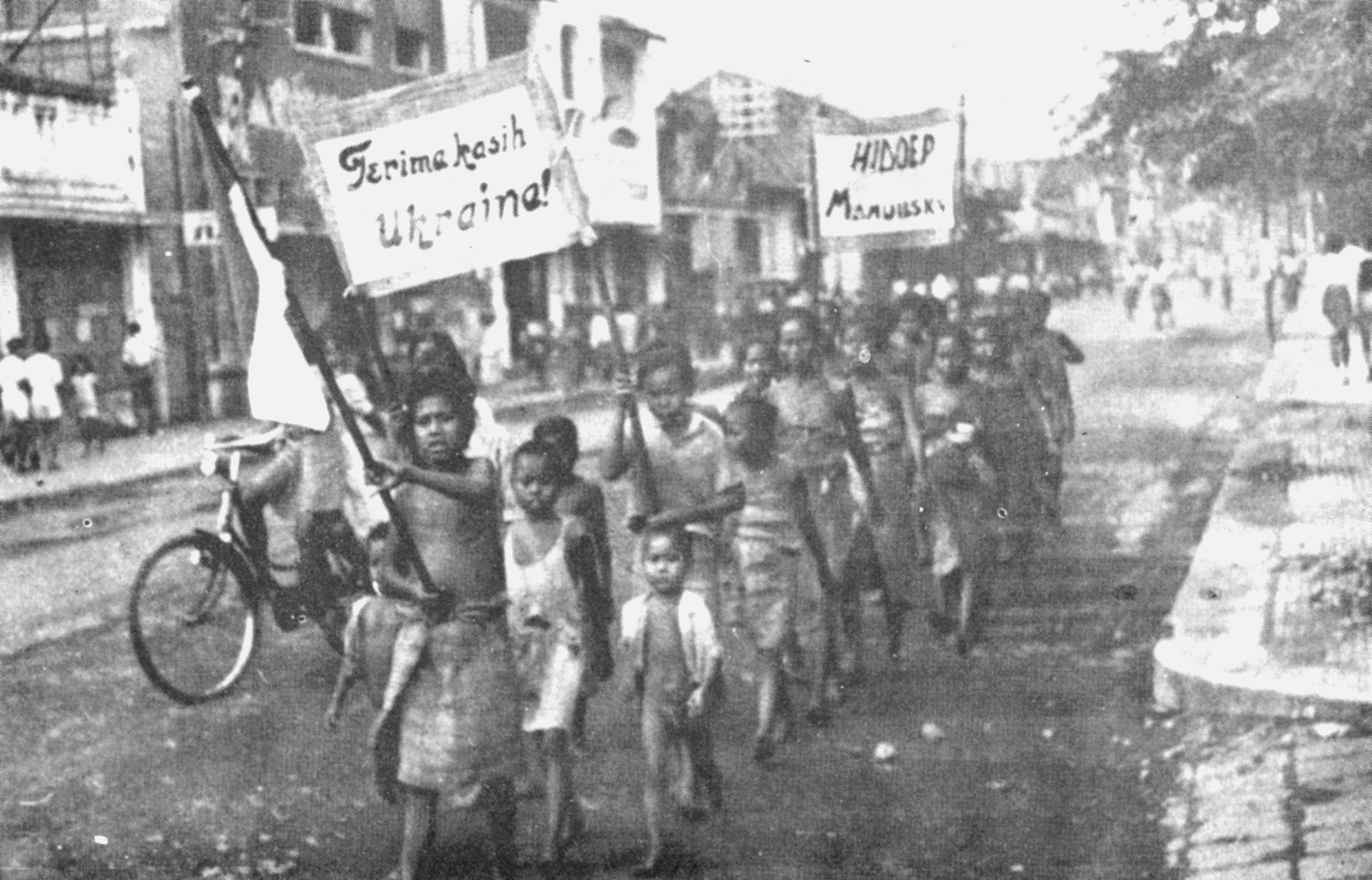
A 1946 march during the Indonesian National Revolution to give thanks to Ukraine for forwarding the Indonesian question for sovereignty to the United Nations Security Council, forwarded by Dmitry Manuilsky. The sign reads, "Thank You Ukraine!" and "Long Live Manuilsky."

After the dissolution of the Soviet Union, Indonesia promptly recognized Ukraine on 28 December 1991. On 11 June 1992 in Moscow, Indonesia and Ukraine signed the joint communique on the establishment of diplomatic relations. Indonesia established its embassy in Kyiv in 1994, while Ukraine opened its embassy in Jakarta in 1996. Roni Hendrawan Kurniadi was the first ambassador of Indonesia to Ukraine in 1994.

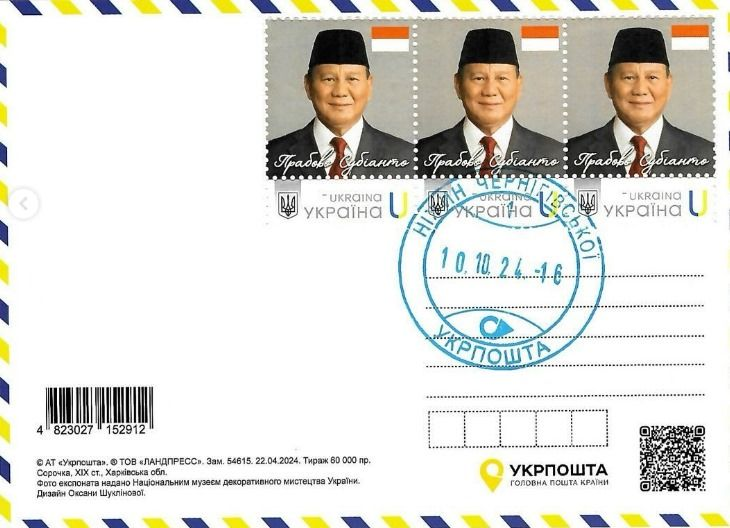
2024 postal cover of Ukraine released by postal agency Ukrposhta featuring stamps with the portrait of President of Indonesia Prabowo Subianto.

On 29 June 2022, during the Russian invasion of Ukraine, President of Indonesia Joko Widodo visited Ukraine and met with President of Ukraine Volodymyr Zelenskyy in Irpin, a town that suffered heavy damage during the war. Having met President of Russia Vladimir Putin shortly afterward, Widodo might have intended to serve as a mediator between the two countries to end the war, which has had negative consequences for Indonesia in the energy and food sectors. On 3 June 2023, during the Shangri-La Dialogue conference in Singapore, the Indonesian Defense Minister Prabowo Subianto proposed a peace plan between Russia and Ukraine. The plan oversaw the establishment of demilitarized zones guaranteed by international observers and United Nations (UN) peacekeeping forces, as well as a referendum in "the disputed areas" held by the UN. Ukraine rejected it, and the European Union expressed its disapproval.

The current ambassador is Arief Muhammad Basalamah, who was appointed by President Joko Widodo on 26 June 2023.

== Economy and trade ==
In 2011, the total trade volume between the two nations reached US$1.27 billion, and increased to US$1.32 billion in 2012. The trade balance between the two nations is in Ukraine's favor; in 2012, Indonesia's exports to Ukraine were US$548.9 million, while its imports from Ukraine were US$774.1 million.

Indonesian export commodities to Ukraine includes palm oil, nickel, natural rubber, paper, animal fats, coffee, tea, plastic, cocoa, spices, electrical equipment, textiles and furniture, while importing fertilizers, milk, sugar, wheat, iron and steel products, arms and weaponry and also gun powder from Ukraine. Among ASEAN exporters to Ukraine, Indonesia is ranked as the highest.

== See also ==
- Foreign relations of Indonesia
- Foreign relations of Ukraine
