= Ukraine–Venezuela relations =

- Venezuela: Ukraine

Relations between Ukraine and Venezuela were established on 9 January 1992 with the recognition of Ukraine's independence by Venezuela. Both countries have no embassies in the respective other country.

== History ==
=== 1990s ===
On 9 January 1992, Venezuela recognized Ukraine's independence.

In April 1999, the Minister for Foreign Affairs of Ukraine Borys Tarasyuk paid his first official visit to Venezuela. There, he said that Latin America is not a "terra incognita" for Ukrainian foreign policy. Tarasyuk argued that the region is an important market for Ukrainian products and that Ukraine should actively develop contacts with Latin American countries.

=== 2010s ===
In September 2010, the Venezuelan vice foreign minister Temir Porras Ponceleon visited Deputy Minister of Foreign Affairs of Ukraine Oleksandr Horin and they discussed a "wide range of issues of Ukrainian-Venezuelan cooperation in political, trade and economic and humanitarian spheres".

In October 2010, Venezuelan president Hugo Chávez met with then-Ukrainian president Viktor Yanukovych in Kyiv. The Ukrainian head of state said that "a lot of time has been lost between our two countries" and further noted that the world "can expect a deepening of cooperation" between both of the countries. Chávez visited the Antonov plant in Kyiv and agreed with Yanukovych on establishing embassies of each country in the other country. Both head of states signed agreements regarding the Odesa–Brody pipeline.

As agreed during the Kyiv visit, the Ukrainian Foreign minister Kostyantyn Gryshchenko paid an official visit to Venezuela in December 2010. The delegation included representatives of ministries, governmental agencies and leading companies of Ukraine, interested in development of cooperation with Venezuela.

On 7 March 2014, the Venezuelan Foreign Ministry released a statement which said President Nicolás Maduro "condemns the coup perpetrated by extremist groups in Ukraine following an attrition strategy promoted from abroad by the government of the United States and its NATO allies." It further stated, "the installation in Kyiv of de facto authorities not only threatens Ukraine's national unity, but the stability of the entire region as it places in danger Ukrainian citizens of Russian origin and the Russian Federation's own sovereignty." Venezuela did not recognize the secession and subsequent accession of Crimea to the Russian Federation. Nevertheless, Venezuela was one of the eleven countries that voted against the United Nations General Assembly Resolution 68/262, approved on 27 March, recognized Crimea as part of Ukraine and rejected the referendum on the political status. Although Venezuela did later recognize the annexation. In late 2014, Oleg Tsaryov, then the speaker of the Parliament of Novorossiya (a confederation that included the Donetsk and Luhansk People's Republic), appealed to Venezuela to recognize the independence of the two separatist republics.

Ukraine rejected the results of the 2018 Venezuelan presidential election, where Nicolás Maduro was declared the winner.

In 2019, during the Venezuelan presidential crisis, Ukraine recognized Juan Guaidó as president of Venezuela.

=== 2020s ===
In early 2022, the Venezuelan government blamed NATO and the United States for the Russian invasion of Ukraine, stating that they had violated the Minsk agreements. Nicolás Maduro said before the invasion was launched that Venezuela was with Putin, but also urged a diplomatic dialogue to avoid escalating the conflict. José David Chaparro, who served as Venezuela's chargé d'affaires in Moscow between 2001 and 2005 and settled in Kyiv in the early 90s, enlisted in Ukraine's Territorial Defense Forces in the second day of the invasion along with his wife and became the commander of the Bolivar Battalion, a division of Spanish-speaking pro-Ukrainian volunteers. Chaparro's unit has helped donating food, water, commodities and fuel to civilians affected by Russian bombings.

== Trade ==
Currently, trade relations between both countries are minimal. In 2020, Ukraine exported goods worth 4.68 million US dollars to Venezuela, mostly seed oils, wheat flours and petroleum. The same year, Venezuela exported goods worth 541,000 $ to Ukraine, mostly processed crustaceans, hard liquor and electric furnaces.
