= Ukrainian Uruguayans =

Ethnic group

Ukrainian Uruguayans Ucraniano-uruguayos
Languages
- Rioplatense Spanish; Ukrainian; Russian

Religion
- Christianity; Judaism

Related ethnic groups
- Ukrainian people; Ukrainian Argentines

Ukrainian Uruguayans (Ukrainian: Українці Уругваю, Ukrajintsi Urugvaju, Spanish: Ucraniano-uruguayos) are an ethnic minority in Uruguay.

Ukrainians arrived in Uruguay around the 1920s, coming from Western Ukraine, Bukovina and the Zakarpattia Oblast, as well as some immigrants from Argentina. During the last years of the World War II, many displaced people came from Europe.

According to Ukrainian sources, nowadays there are several thousands of people of Ukrainian descent living in Uruguay. Other local sources report about only several hundred people of Ukrainian descent living in Uruguay, mainly in Salto Department; further, the 2011 Uruguayan census revealed 70 people who declared Ukraine as their country of birth. A recent bilateral agreement aims at further research on Ukrainian roots in Uruguay.

== Notable people ==
- Miguel Terekhov (1928–2012), ballet dancer and instructor
- Henry Engler Golovchenko (born 1946), neuroscientist
- Nando Parrado Dolgay (born 1949), entrepreneur and motivational speaker
- Estela Golovchenko (born 1963), playwright, actress, and theater director
- Macarena Gelman (born 1976), activist and politician
- Daniel Fedorczuk (born 1976), FIFA football referee
- Santiago Homenchenko (born 2003), football player, U-20 world champion 2023

== See also ==
- Ukraine–Uruguay relations
- Ukrainian diaspora
- Immigration to Uruguay
