= Bangladesh–Ukraine relations =

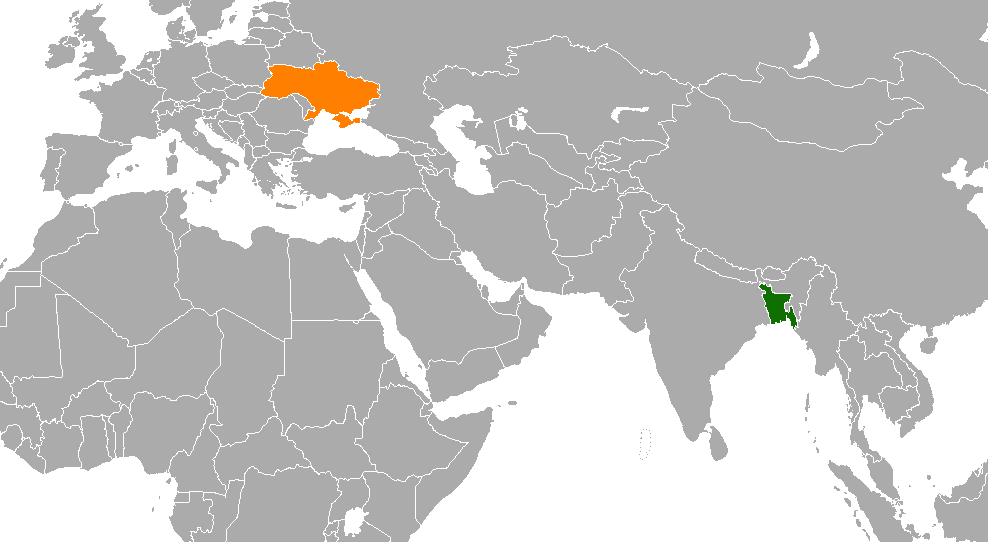

- Bangladesh: Ukraine

Bangladesh–Ukraine relations refer to the bilateral relations between Bangladesh and Ukraine. Ukraine (then known as the Ukrainian SSR) recognized Bangladesh's independence on 24 January 1972. Ahmed Akbar Sobhan chairman of Bashundhara Group is the current honorary Consul General of Ukraine in Bangladesh.

== Agricultural cooperation ==
Agricultural has been identified as a promising sector for cooperation between Bangladesh and Ukraine. In August 2011, the food minister of Ukraine Mykola Prysyazhnyuk visited Bangladesh to explore potential ways for cooperation in the agricultural field. Ukraine has shown interest to transfer its agricultural technology to Bangladesh. In 2011, Bangladesh signed an MoU with Ukraine for importing 100,000 tonnes of wheat at state level. In 2013 Bangladesh imported 200,000 tonnes of wheat from Ukraine on government to government basis.

== Economic cooperation ==
Bangladesh and Ukraine have shown interest in expanding the bilateral economic activities between the two countries and both the countries have been taking necessary steps in this regard. Bangladeshi exports to Ukraine include fisheries, leather, ready made garments, textile, edible oil, vegetables, pharmaceuticals and tobacco while Ukraine mainly exports mineral goods, chemical, machinery and electrical equipment to Bangladesh. Ukrainian business firms have shown their intention to form joint ventures for investing the shipbuilding, fabricated steel and chemical fertilisers industries of Bangladesh. Ukraine has also expressed its interest in developing the port facilities in Bangladesh.

== Education ==
There are Bangladeshi students studying at Luhansk State Medical University.

== See also ==
- Foreign relations of Bangladesh
- Foreign relations of Ukraine
