= Algeria–Ukraine relations =

- Algeria: Ukraine

Diplomatic mission
- Algerian Embassy, Kyiv: Ukrainian Embassy, Algiers

Algeria recognized Ukraine's independence in 1992. Diplomatic relations were established in 1993.

Algeria has an embassy in Kyiv. Ukraine has an embassy in Algiers (opened in 1999).

== History ==
Algeria recognized Ukraine's independence in 1992. Diplomatic relations were established in 1993. Soon (1993–1994), military and trade agreements between two countries were signed.

The Soviet Union being one of the major supporters of independent Algeria, the economic connections between the Soviet Ukraine and Algeria were fairly significant, since a large portion of Soviet industries (in particular, of the aerospace industry), as well as the major port of Odesa were located in that republic. After Ukraine declared its independence, economic connections between the two countries continued, Algeria and Egypt remaining, as of the early 2000s, the two most important trade partners of Ukraine in the region of Africa and the Middle East.

Political contacts between the two countries lagged the development of economic contacts; it was not until 2002 that the Ukrainian Foreign Minister Anatoliy Zlenko visited Algeria the first. As Ukrainian analysts noted at the time, one of Ukraine's priorities in the development of its relations with the North African countries at the time was extending the spectrum of economic relations: moving from exporting metals, chemicals, and foodstuffs to selling civilian and military aircraft and other high-tech products. A Ukrainian products' exhibition, Algeria-Ukraine 2002 took place in Algeria the same year, and a tax treaty was signed.

A bilateral agreement on cooperation in the peaceful use of outer space was reached in 2007.

In 2008, capitalizing on the large "installed base" of Soviet-made (that is, often, produced in Ukraine) equipment used by the Algerian military, Ukraine reached an agreement with Algeria concerning provision of maintenance, repair, and upgrade services. The agreement, which also provided for exchanging military attachés, was signed by the two countries defense ministers during the visit of the Ukrainian Defense Minister Yuriy Yekhanurov to Algeria. According to the news reports, Algerian top officers visiting Ukraine were reported as particularly interested in visiting Ukrainian aerospace companies (such as Antonov and Luch), and the armored vehicles repair plant in Kyiv.

In February 2023, Algeria reopened its embassy in Kyiv after it had been closed due to the 2022 Russian invasion of Ukraine.

== Trade ==
The overall volume of trade between the two countries reached US$355 million in 2003. That included at least some amount of weapons trade. For example, it was reported that in 2003 Ukraine sold to Algeria 5 Mikoyan MiG-29 fighters and 16 Mil Mi-24 helicopters, buying back some old Mikoyan-Gurevich MiG-21s.

Ukraine's trade with Algeria in 2009 was worth $300 million, but in recent years trade between Ukraine and Algeria has fallen.

== See also ==
- Foreign relations of Algeria
- Foreign relations of Ukraine
- Embassy of Algeria, Kyiv
