= Cyprus–Ukraine relations =

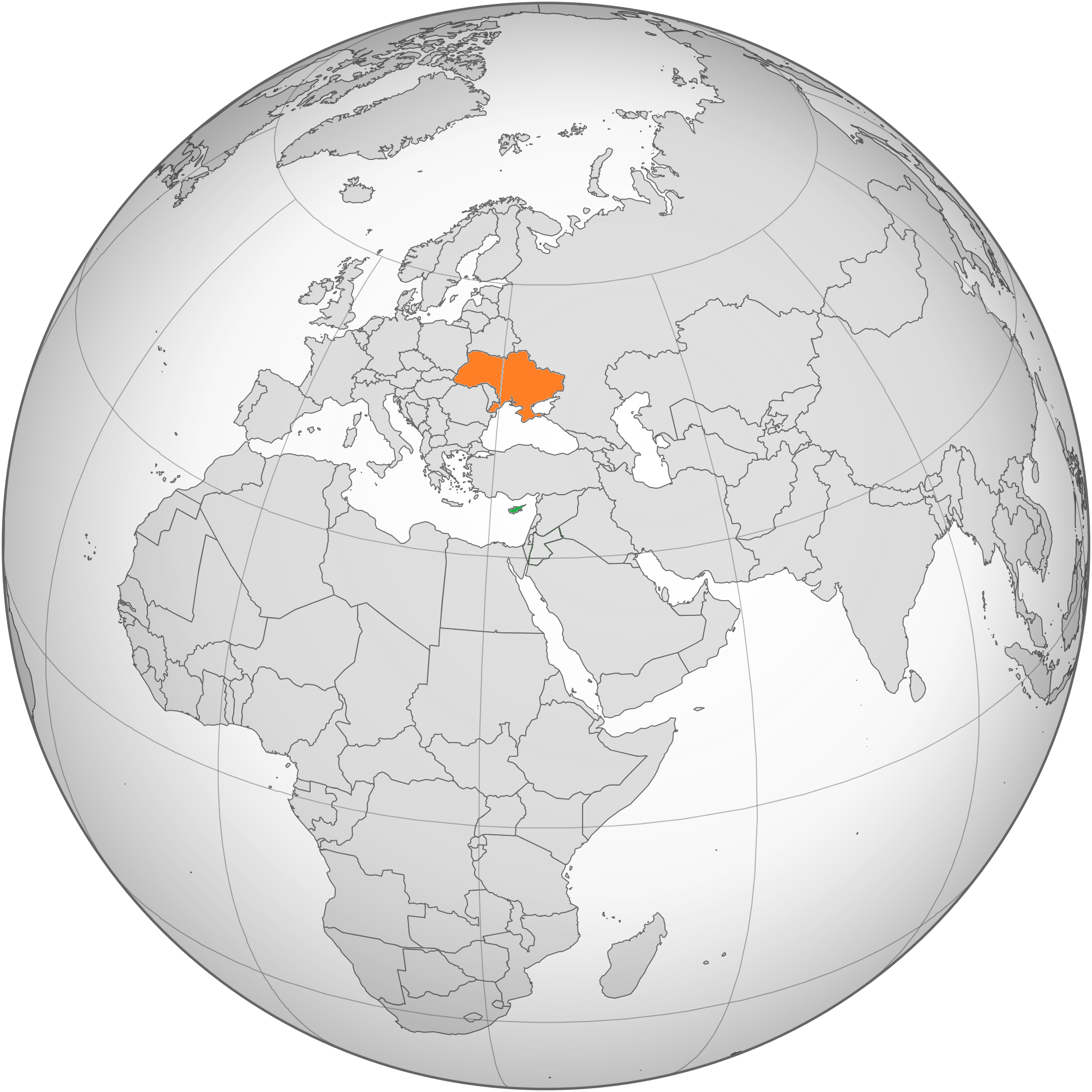
- Cyprus: Ukraine

Diplomatic mission
- Embassy of Cyprus, Kyiv: Embassy of Ukraine, Nicosia

Cyprus–Ukraine relations (Ukrainian: Українсько-кіпрські відносини) refers to the bilateral relations between Republic of Cyprus and Ukraine. Cyprus joined the European Union in 2004, while Ukraine is a candidate for EU accession. Both countries are full members of the Council of Europe.

== History ==
Cyprus recognized the independence of Ukraine on 27 December, 1991, and on 19 February, 1992 diplomatic relations between the countries were established.

In Ukraine, there is an embassy of Cyprus in Kyiv (since 2011) and honorary consulates in Odesa and Mariupol (temporarily closed). In Cyprus, there is an embassy of Ukraine in Nicosia and an honorary consulate in Limassol.

A visa-free regime operates between the countries.

== Economic cooperation ==
According to the Embassy of Ukraine, the volume of bilateral trade in goods and services between the countries in 2020 amounted to $674.6 million, with exports for Ukraine amounting to $418.9 million and imports to $255.8 million.

According to the National Bank of Ukraine, Cyprus ranks first among the countries in the world that invest in the Ukrainian economy (as of April 3, 2020, the total amount of investment was $14.95 billion) According to some experts, this is due to the fact that Cyprus is an offshore zone, to which funds are withdrawn to avoid taxation. In particular, as of 2015, investments by Ukrainian companies in Cyprus accounted for 93 % of the total level of direct investment of Ukraine abroad.

== Military cooperation ==
Ukraine participated in the work of the UN Peacekeeping Force in Cyprus, UN peacekeeping mission in Cyprus, en and United Nations Peacekeeping Force in Cyprus. As of October 2020, the mission headquarters consisted of 1 national serviceman (duty operations officer) and 6 police officers of the National Police of Ukraine (including 2 women).

== See also ==
- Foreign relations of Cyprus
- Foreign relations of Ukraine
- Ukraine-EU relations
  - Accession of Ukraine to the EU
