= Ukraine–Uruguay relations =

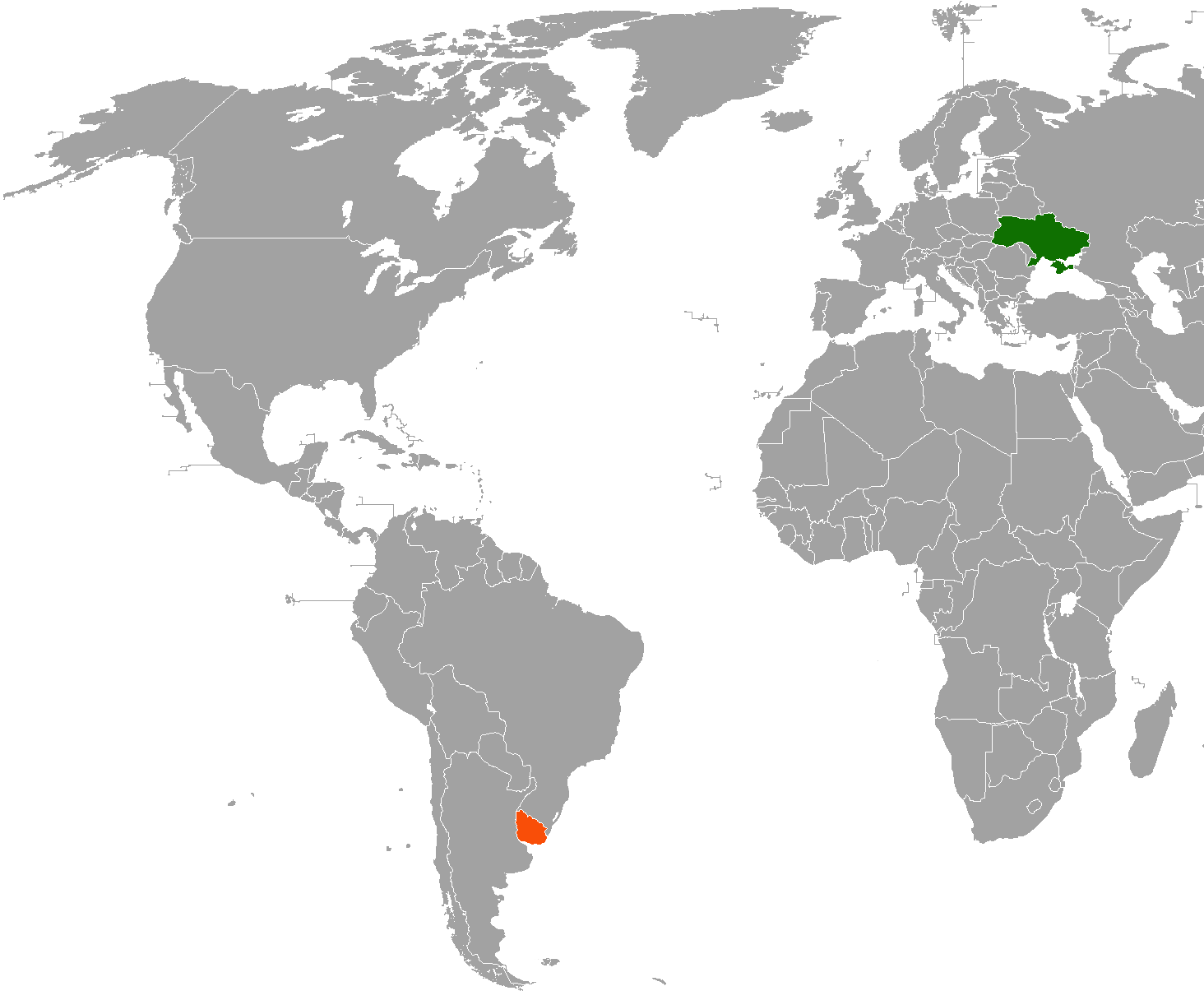
- Ukraine: Uruguay

Diplomatic relations between Ukraine and Uruguay have existed since 1992, after Ukrainian independence from the Soviet Union a year before. The importance of relations centers on the history of Ukrainian migration to Uruguay in early 20th century.

== History ==
Ukrainian immigration to Uruguay began in the early 20th century, with individuals arriving from Volhynia, Polesia, Bukovina, and eastern Galicia, including the Zakarpattia Oblast. While most settled primarily in Montevideo, a small number were part of the largely ethnic Russian contingent that founded the town of San Javier.

On December 26, 1991, Uruguay recognized Ukraine's independence after the dissolution of the Soviet Union. On May 18, 1992, the two countries established diplomatic relations, and in the subsequent years, the parliaments of both nations approved the creation of parliamentary friendship groups.

In February 2022, in the context of the Russo-Ukrainian crisis, the Uruguayan government expressed concern over Russia's recognition of the separatist regions of Donetsk and Luhansk, and aligned itself with United Nations Security Council Resolution 2202 for the implementation of the Minsk agreements, seeking a "peaceful and lasting solution to the conflict". Following the Russian invasion at the end of February, the Uruguayan government took a stance in favor of Ukraine, stating that the principles of the United Nations Charter had been "notoriously violated".

Throughout the war, Uruguay has taken a stance in favor of Ukraine's territorial sovereignty in the voting of resolutions at the United Nations General Assembly. In July 2022, Uruguayan President Luis Lacalle Pou and Ukrainian President Volodymyr Zelenskyy had a telephone conversation, and in December 2023, they held a bilateral meeting. In 2024, Ukraine secured the participation of Uruguay in the June peace summit, where Zelenskyy invited Uruguay's government to help advance initiatives including the return of Ukrainian children kidnapped by Russia.

In February 2025, it was announced that Ukraine intended to establish an embassy in Uruguay. This decision was formally confirmed in late April, following a meeting between the Foreign Ministers of both countries, Mario Lubetkin and Andrii Sybiha.

== Trade ==
In 2022, bilateral trade totaled about US$1.86 million, with Ukraine importing far more than it exported to Uruguay. The balance of trade favored Uruguay by US$1.07 million. Ukraine's exports consist mainly of manufactured goods and fuels, while imports from Uruguay are largely pharmaceuticals, seafood, raw materials, and agricultural products. In 2023, total trade rose considerably to about US$4.9 million, and the balance of trade remained strongly positive for Uruguay. In 2024, trade relations grew stronger as Ukraine exported about US$1.01 million to Uruguay while imports from Uruguay reached roughly US$6.5 million, led primarily by machinery exports from Ukraine and wood pulp and fish exports from Uruguay.

== Diplomatic missions ==
- Ukraine is represented in Uruguay through its embassy in Buenos Aires (Argentina).
- Uruguay is represented in Ukraine through its embassy in Bucharest (Romania).

== See also ==
- Foreign relations of Ukraine
- Foreign relations of Uruguay
- Ukrainian Uruguayans
