= Kenya–Ukraine relations =

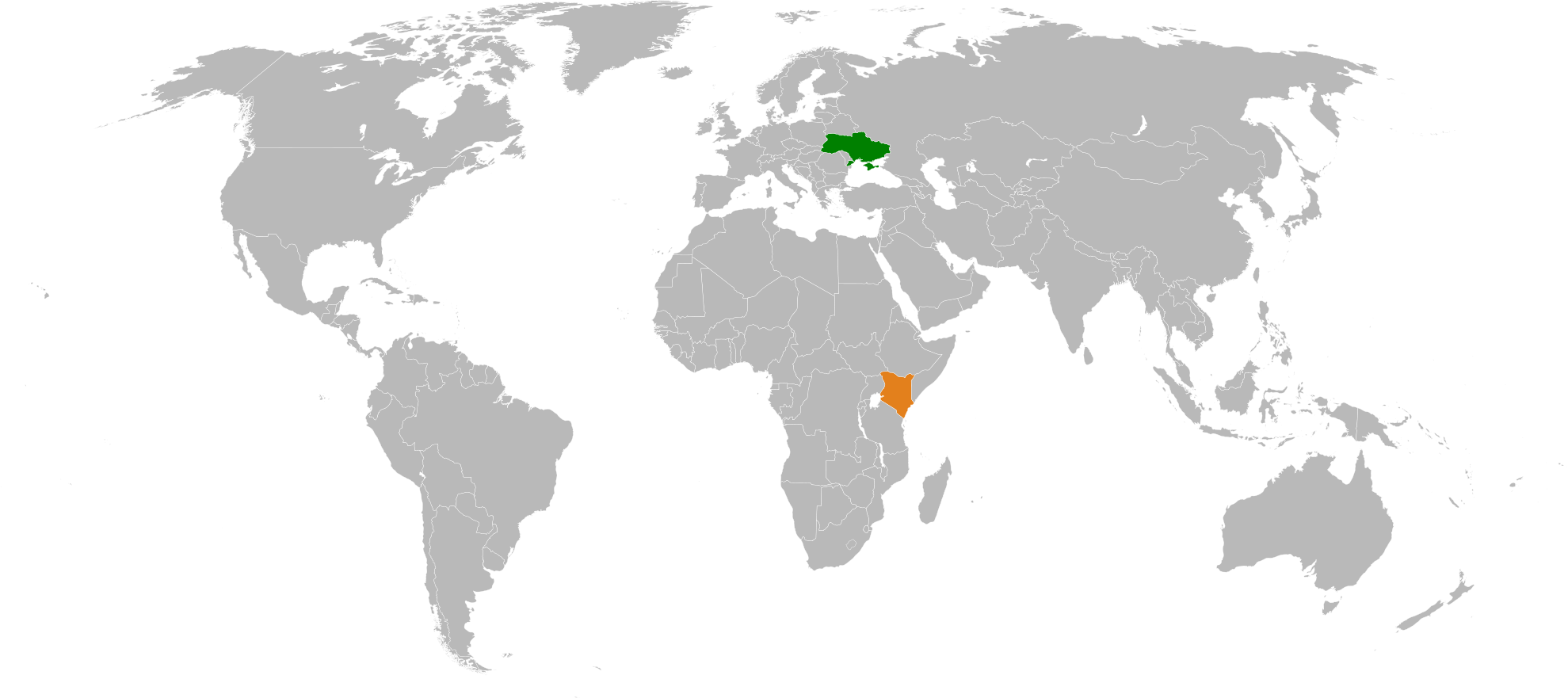
- Ukraine: Kenya

Kenya–Ukraine relations are bilateral relations between Kenya and Ukraine.

== History ==
Kenya recognised Ukraine as an independent country on March 5, 1993, diplomatic relations were established on the same day. After Ukrainian President, Petro Poroshenko was elected, Uhuru Kenyatta the Kenyan President congratulated him. The Ukraine embassy was opened in 2004, and it is also accredited to Tanzania. The first bilateral conversation between both countries occurred on September 8, 2022 when Ukrainian President Volodymyr Zelenskyy spoke with newly elected Kenyan President William Ruto. The Ministry of Foreign Affairs in Kenya declared that there are 201 Kenyans in Ukraine, comprising 18 Consular staff and 183 Kenya students as of February 2022 when the Russian invasion of Ukraine started.

== Development cooperation ==
Trade, economic, military-technical and culture have been identified as key areas of cooperation.

Amid the annexation of Crimea by the Russian Federation, Kenya's Foreign Secretary was quoted saying that Kenya respects the territorial sovereignty of others and that every country should do the same. She was meeting with the Ukrainian Ambassador to Kenya at the time. This might have been a hint that Kenya viewed the situation in Crimea as occupation by a foreign country. Kenya urged all parties involved to solve the crisis peacefully.

Since 2010 the Ukrainian government has offered 50 scholarships for Kenyans to study in Ukraine.

== Trade ==
In 2013, Ukraine exported goods worth KES. 13 billion (US$143 million) to Kenya, Kenya exported goods worth KES. 925 million (US$10.1 million).

Ukraine is a major arms supplier to the Kenya Defence Forces. In 2008, Kenya bought 33 Soviet-era T-72 tanks from Ukraine, it was suggested that Kenya was buying them for the South Sudanese government. However later on, it was proved that Kenya had integrated all the tanks into the Kenyan Army.

Kenya has been urging Ukrainian investors to consider investing in infrastructure, tourism, ICT, mining and the emerging oil and gas sector.

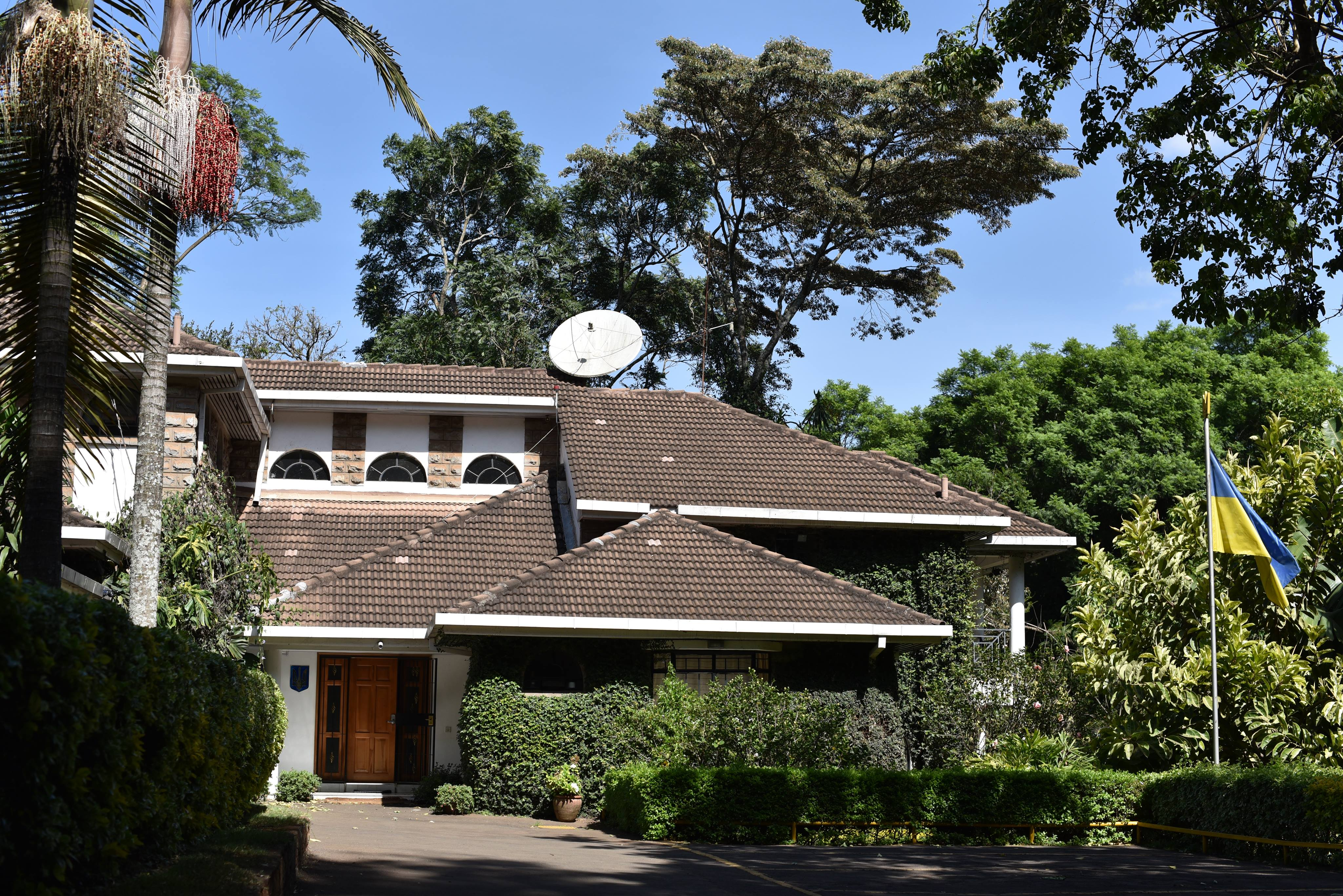
Embassy of Ukraine in Nairobi

== Diplomatic missions ==
- Kenya is accredited to Ukraine from its embassy in Vienna, Austria.
- Ukraine has an embassy in Nairobi.

== See also ==
- Foreign relations of Kenya
- Foreign relations of Ukraine
