= Ukrainians in Mexico =

Ukrainians in Mexico (Spanish: Ucranianos en México; Ukrainian: Українці в Мексиці, romanized: Ukrayintsi v Meksytsi) are a Ukrainian ethnic minority living in Mexico. The total number of diaspora (according to the census) is between 400 and 1,500 people, of whom 230 are on the consular register.

The largest organization is the Association of Ukrainians of Mexico "Slavutych", headed by Natalia V. Khotyaintseva, there are Ukrainian language departments at the National Autonomous University of Mexico and Monterey, the Ukrainian Dance Ensemble and one newspaper.

== Demographics ==
- 1990 - 566 people
- 2000 - 978 people
- 2010 - 1,500 people
- 2014 - 4,832 people
- 2022 - 44,968

== Notable people ==
- Marcos Moshinsky - a prominent Mexican physicist of Ukrainian-Jewish descent, whose research in particle physics was awarded the Prince of Asturias Prize for Technical and Scientific Research in 1988.
- Tosia Malamud (1923-2008) - a Mexican sculptor of Ukrainian descent (a native of Vinnytsia), one of the first women graduates of the Mexican National School of Arts.
- Ana Layevska - a Ukrainian-born actress and singer.

== See also ==
- Mexico–Ukraine relations
- White Mexicans
- Ukrainian diaspora
