= Iraq–Ukraine relations =

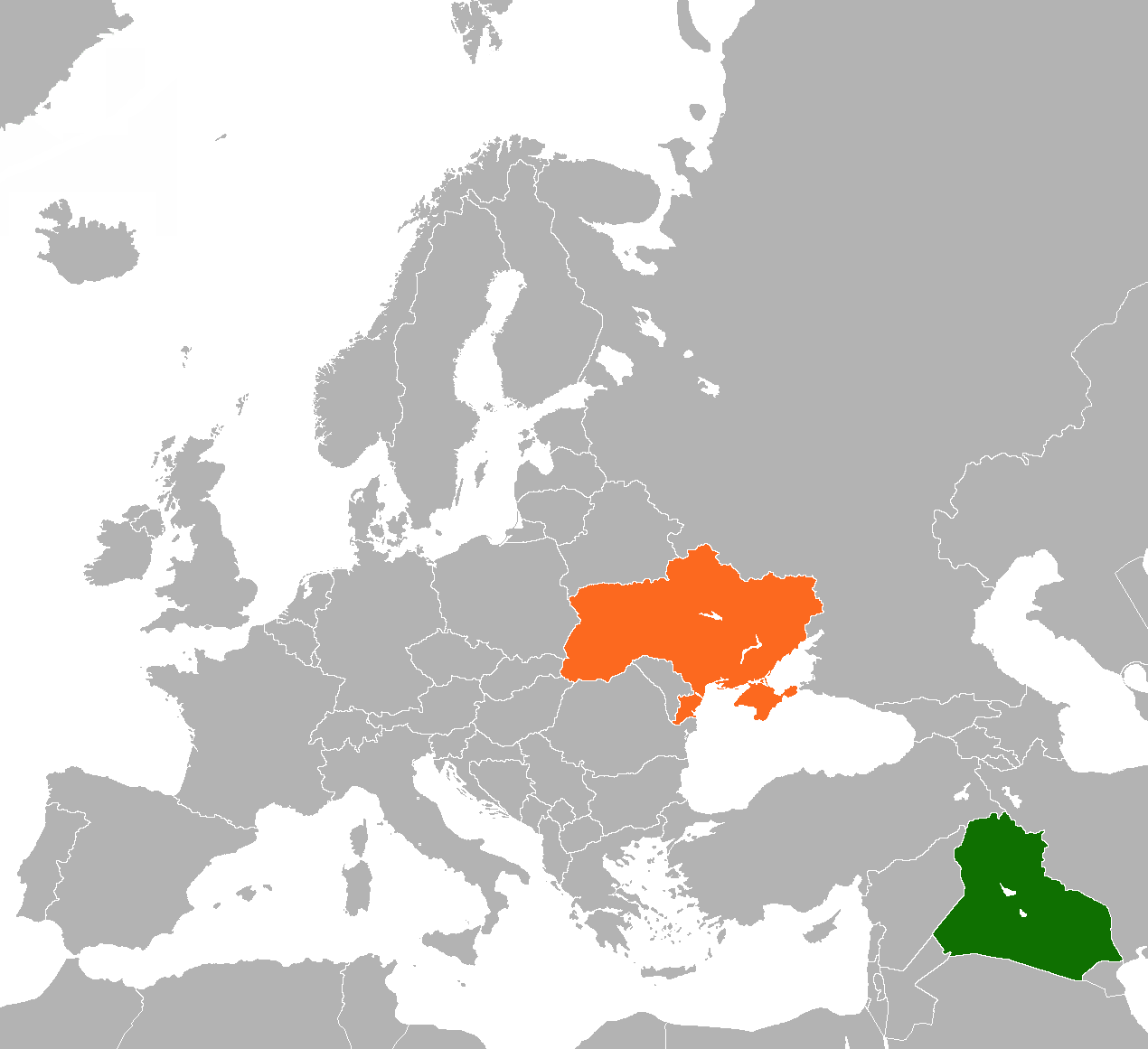
- Iraq: Ukraine

Iraq–Ukraine relations are the interstate ties between Iraq and Ukraine. Iraq has an embassy in Kyiv and Ukraine has an embassy in Baghdad.

Approximately 5000 Ukrainian soldiers, in total, served in Iraq in the wake of the 2003 invasion of Iraq and subsequent Occupation of Iraq (2003–2011). Ukraine provided the seventh-largest number of forces in Iraq with about 1,700 soldiers from 2003-2005 – 18 of them were killed. In 2004, Ukraine was recognized as providing "excellent support" in the American administration's campaign against "terrorists" in Iraq. Public opposition to war increased in Ukraine following Ukrainian troops hasty retreat and loss of Kut city to insurgents, which infuriated coalition leaders and led to a reassessment of Ukrainian activities in Iraq. In 2006, they shifted their operational focus and down-sized to a peacekeeping force of about 40 soldiers.

== History ==
The formation and the development of the bilateral cooperation between the two states are determined by traditional historical ties and significant potential for cooperation in trade, economic, military, and scientific areas. The valuable experience of participation of Ukrainian enterprises in development of the infrastructure of Iraq and development of the whole industries of Iraq's economy during the 1980s became a historical foundation for development of mutual relations.

At the same time, the application of international sanctions towards Iraq and a complex international situation around Baghdad substantially constrained active development of mutual relations during the 1990s. However, Iraq still remained one of the important directions of Ukrainian policy, particularly in economic sphere.

== Formal relations ==
Diplomatic relations between Iraq and Ukraine were established on December 16, 1992. In May 2001 in Baghdad the Embassy of Ukraine in Iraq re-opened. Iraq also has an embassy in Kyiv. Since 2004 there is the trade and economic mission operating under the auspices of the Embassy of Ukraine in Iraq. At the same time the permanent exhibition of Ukrainian goods and services is organized in Baghdad.

== Economic relations ==
During the pre-war period, economic cooperation between Ukraine and Iraq was developing exclusively within the framework of the United Nations "oil-for-food" program. The commodity structure of trade in the second period was determined by the presence of the international sanctions, which reduced possible assortment of Ukrainian production. In various years the metal products (ferrous metals), products of agriculture (barley, wheat), products of equipment and machinery (agricultural machines, power transformers, engines and generators) were delivered. Exports from Ukraine to Iraq increased from 2,5 million dollars in 1998 to 122.7 million dollars in 2002. In 2001 they reached the highest value in the history of bilateral relations – 293.1 million dollars. During this period Ukraine and Iraq, signed the treaty on trade, economic, scientific and technical cooperation, the association agreement between Commercial and industrial chamber of Ukraine and Federation of chambers of commerce of Iraq, the treaty on friendship and cooperation between Donetsk regional state administration and the administration of the Iraqi province Basra.

In 2003 there were conditions for development of relations between Ukraine and Iraq on a qualitatively new, wider basis. The visit of the Minister of Foreign Affairs of Ukraine Kostiantyn Grishchenko to Iraq, became one of the first high-level officials to visit at this stage of mutual relations.

Bases and parameters of development of relations between Ukraine and new Iraq for the nearest future were outlined in September 2004 during working visit of the Prime minister of Ukraine Viktor Yanukovych to Iraq. During this visit the heads of the governments of Ukraine and Iraq determined such priorities and specific targets for development of bilateral cooperation for the nearest future.

Dynamics of trade turnover in the first half of 2004 indicates a gradual renewal of the volumes of Ukrainian exports to Iraq, as well as its diversification. The export volumes were 18.8 million US dollars and consisted of supplies of locomotives for the amount of 15.5 million US dollars (82%), iron and steel (8.3%), food (4%), medicines (4%), means of hygiene, paper.

In December 2009 Ukraine agreed to supplying arms worth of $550 million to Iraq.

== Resident diplomatic missions ==
- Iraq has an embassy in Kyiv.
- Ukraine has an embassy in Baghdad.
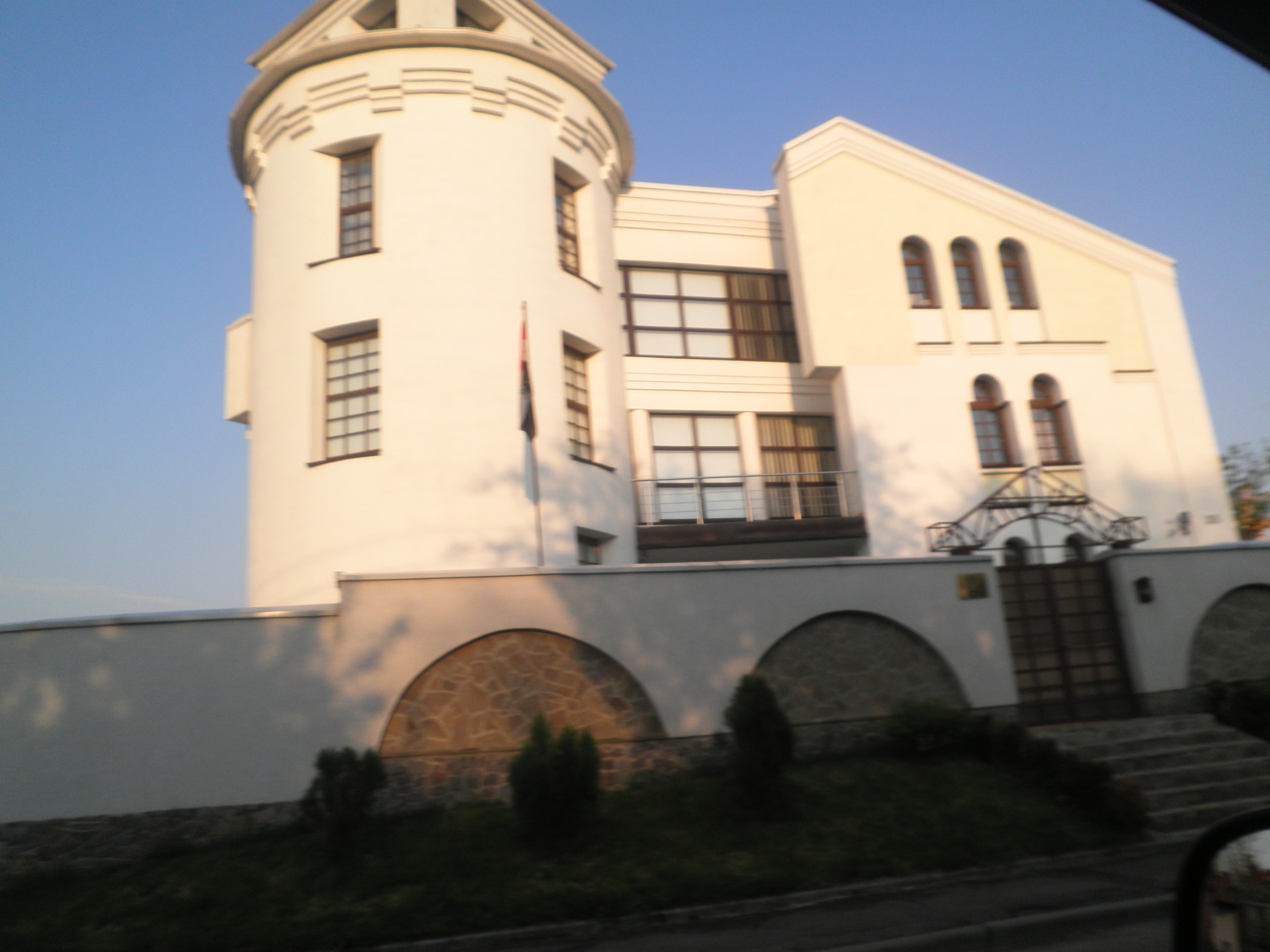
Embassy of Iraq in Kyiv

== See also ==
- Foreign relations of Iraq
- Foreign relations of Ukraine
