= Aung Hlaing Oo =

Burmese businessman

Aung Hlaing Oo (Burmese: အောင်လှိုင်ဦး; born 11 June 1977) is a Burmese businessman who owns Myanmar Chemical & Machinery Co. (MCM). He is known for his close ties to Myanmar's junta leader, Min Aung Hlaing, and is an arms broker for the Burmese military. Aung Hlaing Oo was appointed as Ukraine's honorary consul to Myanmar in 2017.

== Business interests ==
In 2001, Aung Hlaing Oo founded Myanmar Chemical & Machinery Co. (MCM), a local conglomerate, with interests in steel and commodity trading. He has regularly accompanied to Russia with Ming Aung Hlaing. As an arms broker, he assists Myanmar's military in acquiring the gear, equipment, and technology necessary for the production of sophisticated weaponry.

Following the 2021 Myanmar coup d'état, he plays a key role in the Burmese military's acquisition of arms from Ukraine. He planned to establish a factory in Myanmar that would manufacture BTR-4 armored personnel carriers, MMT-40 tanks, and 2SIU self-propelled howitzers for both internal and international usage. The proposed factory is a joint venture between the Myanmar Directorate of Defence Industries of the Myanmar military and the Ukrainian state-owned armaments firm Ukroboronprom. He also imported military equipment for the Air Force from Serbia. Aung Hlaing Oo has also close ties with Lieutenant General Nyo Saw, former chairman of Myanmar Economic Corporation.

On 25 March 2022, ahead of Myanmar Armed Forces Day, both the U.S. and UK governments sanctioned him for supplying weapons to Myanmar's military. On 25 January 2023, the National Unity Government (NUG) blacklisted 9 businessmen, including Aung Hlaing Oo, and their companies for supporting the Burmese military's war crimes and violence.
