= Netherlands–Ukraine relations =

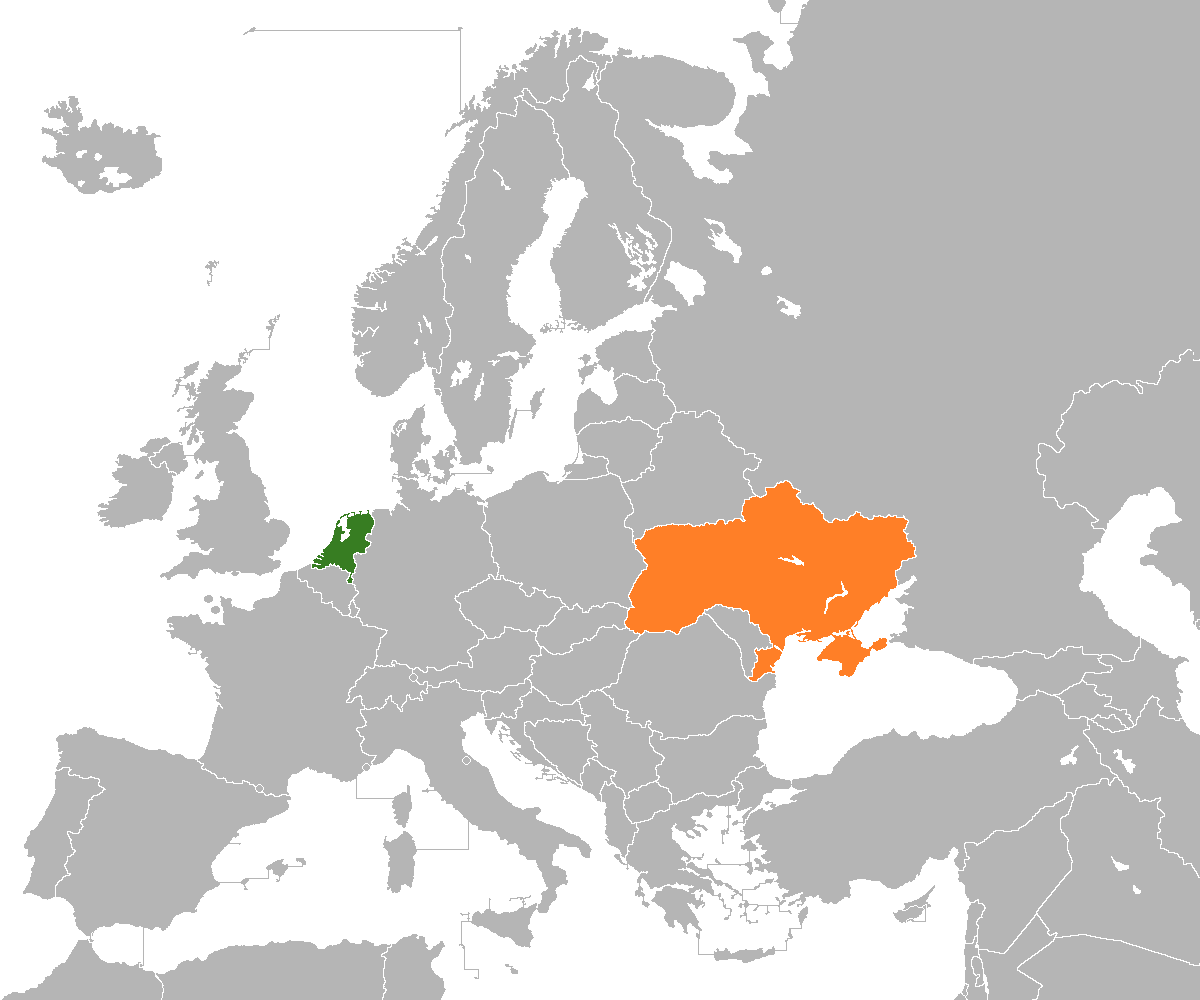
- Netherlands: Ukraine

Diplomatic mission
- Embassy of the Netherlands, Kyiv: Embassy of Ukraine, The Hague

Envoy
- Alle Dornhout: Oleksandr Karasevych

Netherlands–Ukraine relations are foreign relations between the Netherlands and Ukraine. The two countries established diplomatic relations in 1992. Notable incidents in their relations include was the shoot-down of Malaysia Airlines Flight 17 in 2014 and the 2016 Dutch Ukraine–European Union Association Agreement referendum. Netherlands is a member of NATO and the EU which Ukraine applied for in 2022. Both countries are full members of Council of Europe.

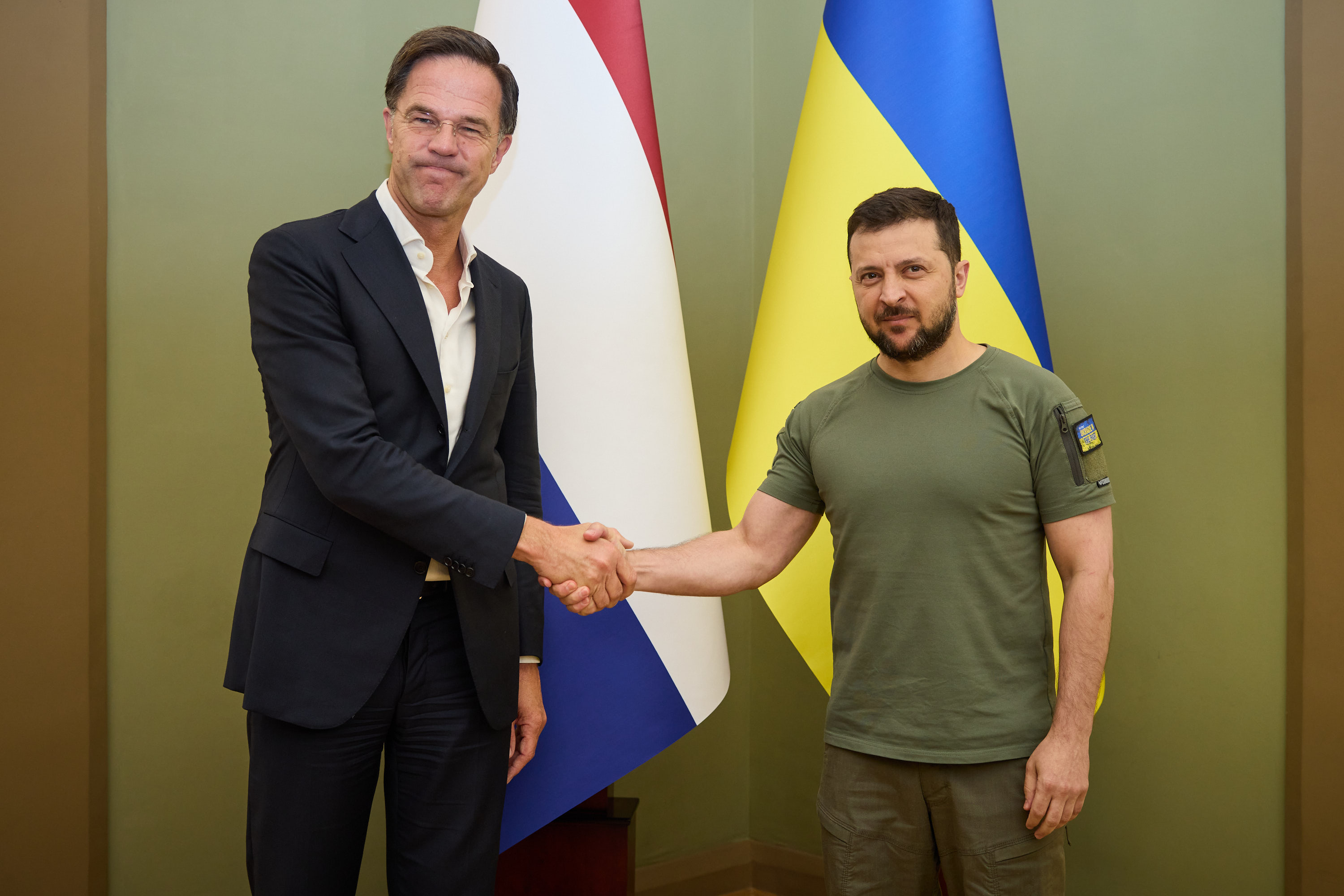
Dutch Prime Minister Mark Rutte with Ukrainian President Volodymyr Zelenskyy in Kyiv, 11 July 2022

== History ==
=== Russo-Ukrainian War ===
In October 2024 it was announced that the Netherlands would allocate 400 million euros to develop drones together with Ukraine.

== Resident diplomatic missions ==
- Netherlands has an embassy in Kyiv.
- Ukraine has an embassy in The Hague.
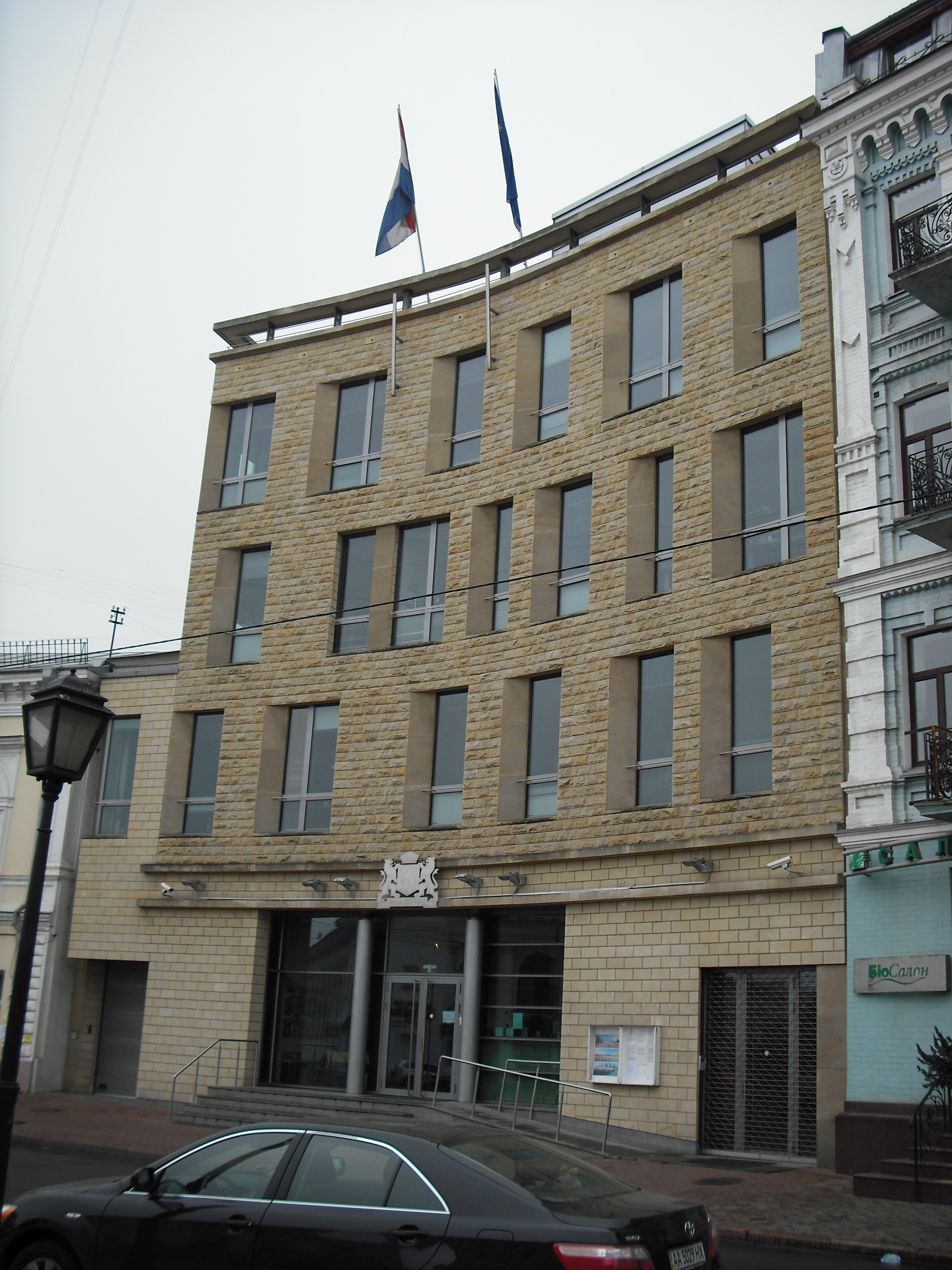
Embassy of the Netherlands in Kyiv

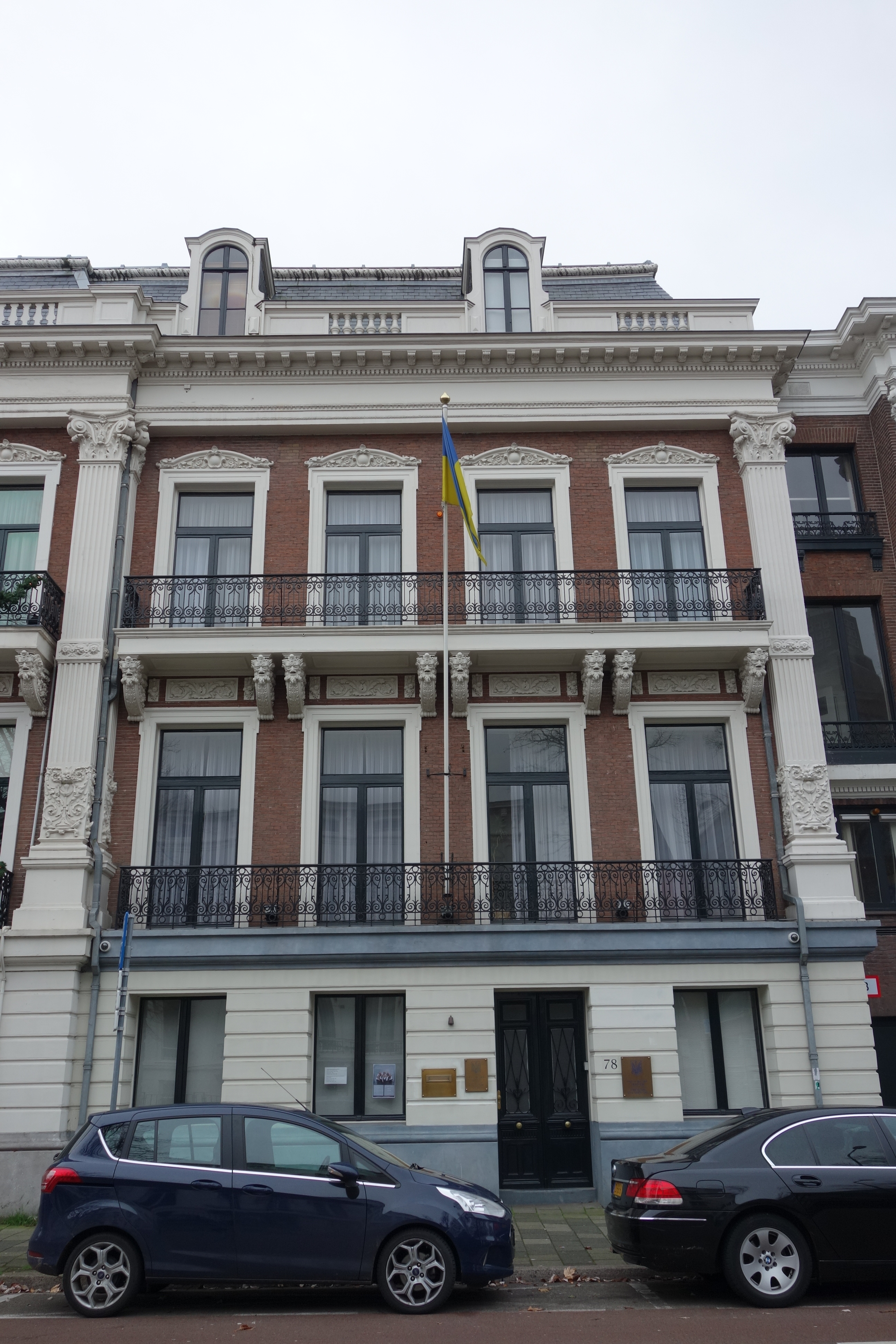
Embassy of Ukraine in Den Haag

== See also ==
- Foreign relations of the Netherlands
- Foreign relations of Ukraine
- Ukraine-NATO relations
- Ukraine-EU relations
  - Accession of Ukraine to the EU
- Ukrainians in the Netherlands
