= Mexico–Ukraine relations =

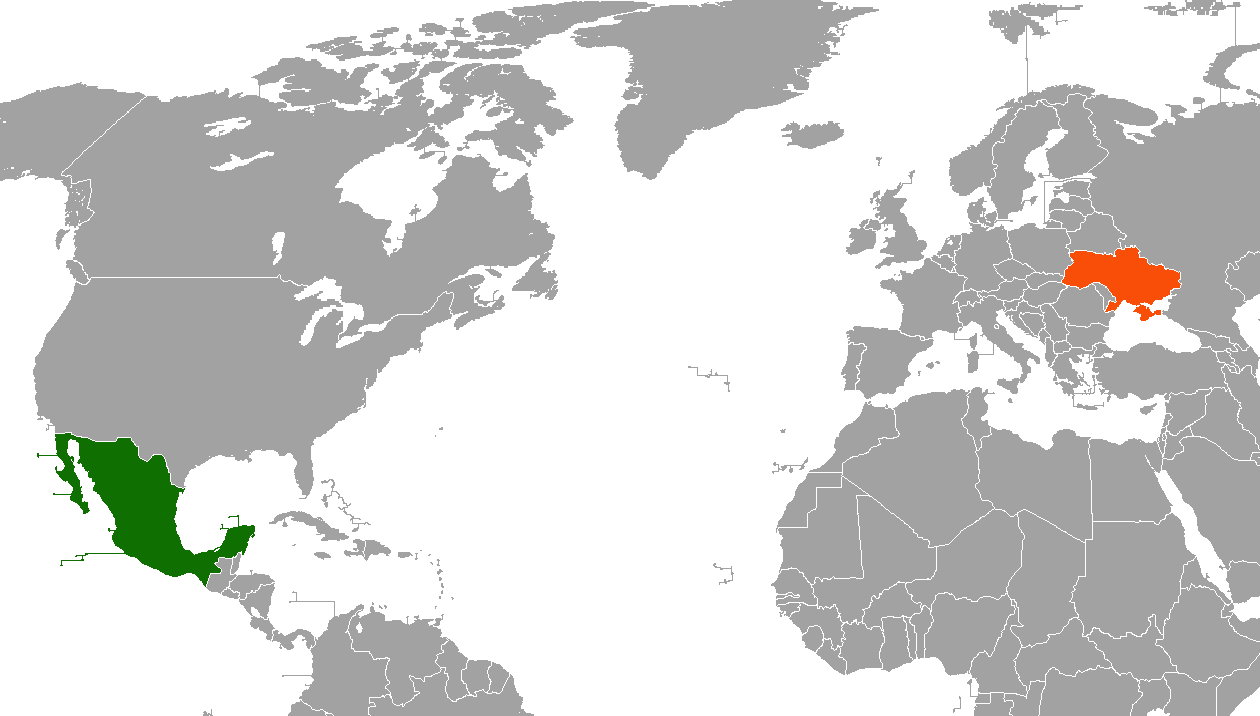

- Mexico: Ukraine

The nations of Mexico and Ukraine established diplomatic relations in 1992. Both nations are members of the United Nations and the World Trade Organization.

== History ==
The first Ukrainians to arrive to Mexico came primarily from the then Austro-Hungarian Empire and settled in the Mexican State of Campeche. On 25 December 1991, Mexico recognized Ukraine as an independent nation after the dissolution of the Soviet Union. On 12 January 1992, Mexico officially established diplomatic relations with Ukraine.

In 1997, Ukrainian president Leonid Kuchma paid an official visit to Mexico, which helped increase bilateral relations between the two nations. In January 1999, Ukraine opened its embassy in Mexico City while Mexico opened an honorary consulate in Kyiv in 2000 while maintaining official relations with Ukraine from its embassy in Warsaw, Poland. In June 2005, Mexican president Vicente Fox paid an official state visit to the country and attended the opening of the Mexican embassy in Kyiv along with Ukrainian President Viktor Yushchenko. In February 2008, the Congress of Mexico recognized that The Holodomor was an act of genocide and criminal act committed against the Ukrainian people by the Soviet Union.

In 2014, during the annexation of Crimea by the Russian Federation, Mexico called for both sides seek dialogue and a peaceful resolution to the matter. The Mexican government also supported the request of the United Nations for the international community to "respect the unity and territorial integrity of Ukraine" and Mexico voted in favor of UN Resolution 68/262 recognizing Crimea as part of Ukraine.

During the Russian invasion of Ukraine, Mexico condemned Russia's action and requested the respect for Ukraine's territorial integrity. Mexico also condemned Russia's action at the United Nations Security Council as a non-permanent member. As a result of the war, over 70 thousand Ukrainians fled to Mexico and most traveled to the U.S. border where they waited to seek asylum and enter the United States. A few Ukrainians have decided to remain in Mexico, with 200 Ukrainians requesting asylum in Mexico that same year.

In April 2023, Ukrainian President, Volodymyr Zelenskyy, spoke via-video conference to the Mexican Congress asking for their support in the war against Russia and asked for Mexico's continued support at the United Nations against the invasion. In addition, President Zelenskyy proposed that Mexico and Latin America organize a special summit to demonstrate their unity and global principles so that the countries of the region may appeal for an end to Russia's invasion of Ukraine.

In December 2023, both nations held their 7th Meeting of the Political Consultation Mechanism where they discussed agreeing to strengthen technical and scientific cooperation to exchange best practices and experiences as well as to specify projects in cultural matters and educational exchanges.

== High-level visits ==
High-level visits from Mexico to Ukraine

- President Vicente Fox (2005)

High-level visits from Ukraine to Mexico

- President Leonid Kuchma (1997)
- Foreign Minister Kostyantyn Gryshchenko (2012)

== Agreements ==
Both nations have signed several bilateral agreements, such as an Agreement of Mutual Interests (1997); Agreement on the elimination of Visa Requirements for Diplomatic Passport holders (1997); Agreement on Scientific, Technical and Technological Cooperation (1997); Agreement on Educational and Cultural Cooperation (1997); Agreement on Trade and Economic Cooperation (2003); Agreement of Cooperation between the National Aerospace University – Kharkiv Aviation Institute of Ukraine and the Instituto Politécnico Nacional of Mexico (2005); Agreement to Avoid Double Taxation and Prevent Fiscal Evasion with respect to Taxes on Income and on Wealth and its Protocol (2012); and an Agreement of Cooperation between the Agencia Espacial Mexicana and the State Space Agency of Ukraine (2017).

== Trade ==
In 2023, two-way trade between both nations amounted to US$125.3 million. Mexico's main exports to Ukraine include: cigars, automobiles, three-wheel motorcycles, electrical circuits and machinery, nuclear reactors, instant coffee, tequila and beer. Ukraine's main exports to Mexico include: steel machinery, automobile parts, wheat and flour. Mexican multinational companies such as Grupo Bimbo, Gruma, Orbia and Sigma Alimentos operate in Ukraine.

== Resident diplomatic missions ==
- Mexico has an embassy in Kyiv.
- Ukraine has an embassy in Mexico City.

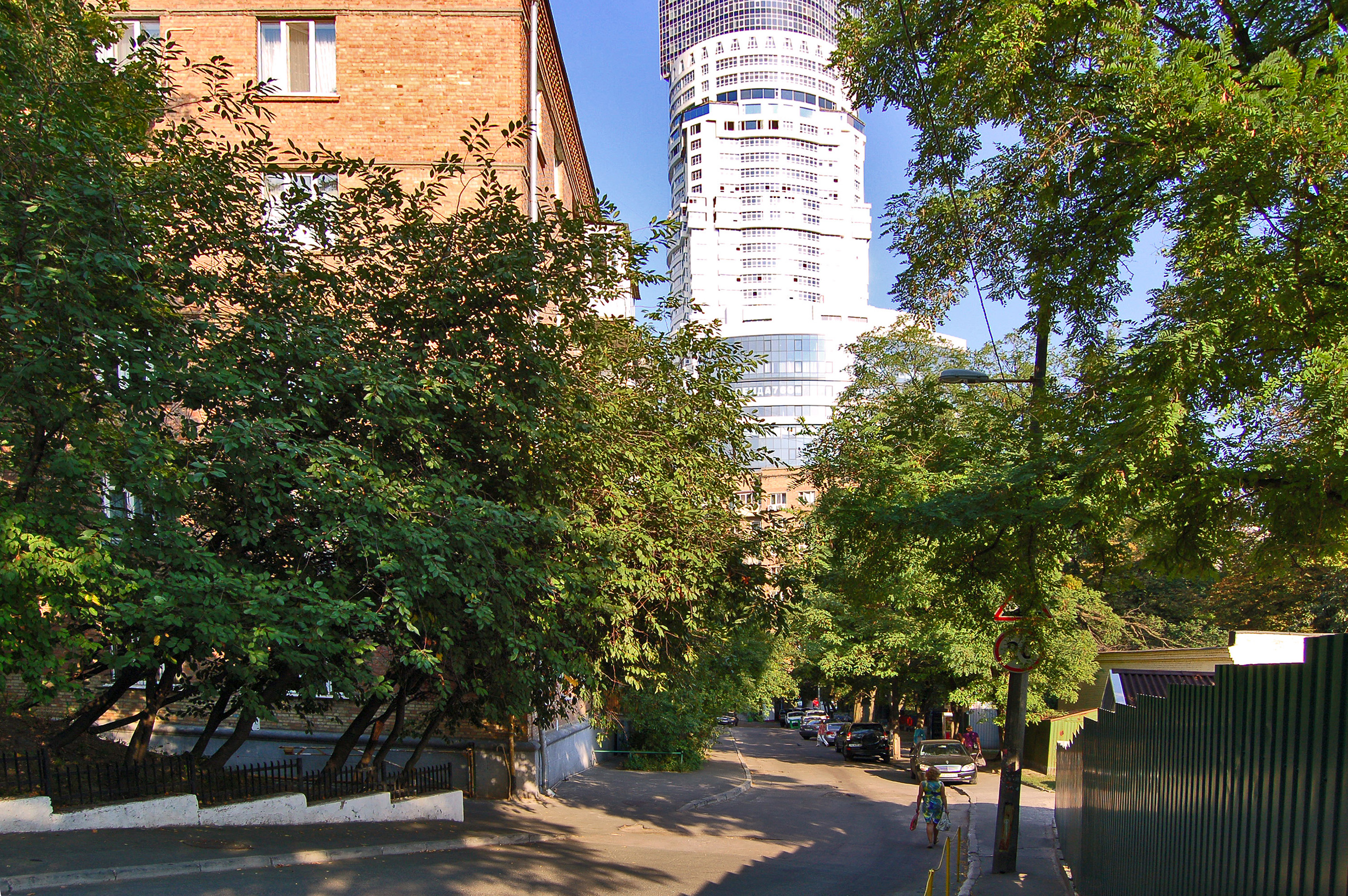
Building hosting the Embassy of Mexico in Kyiv

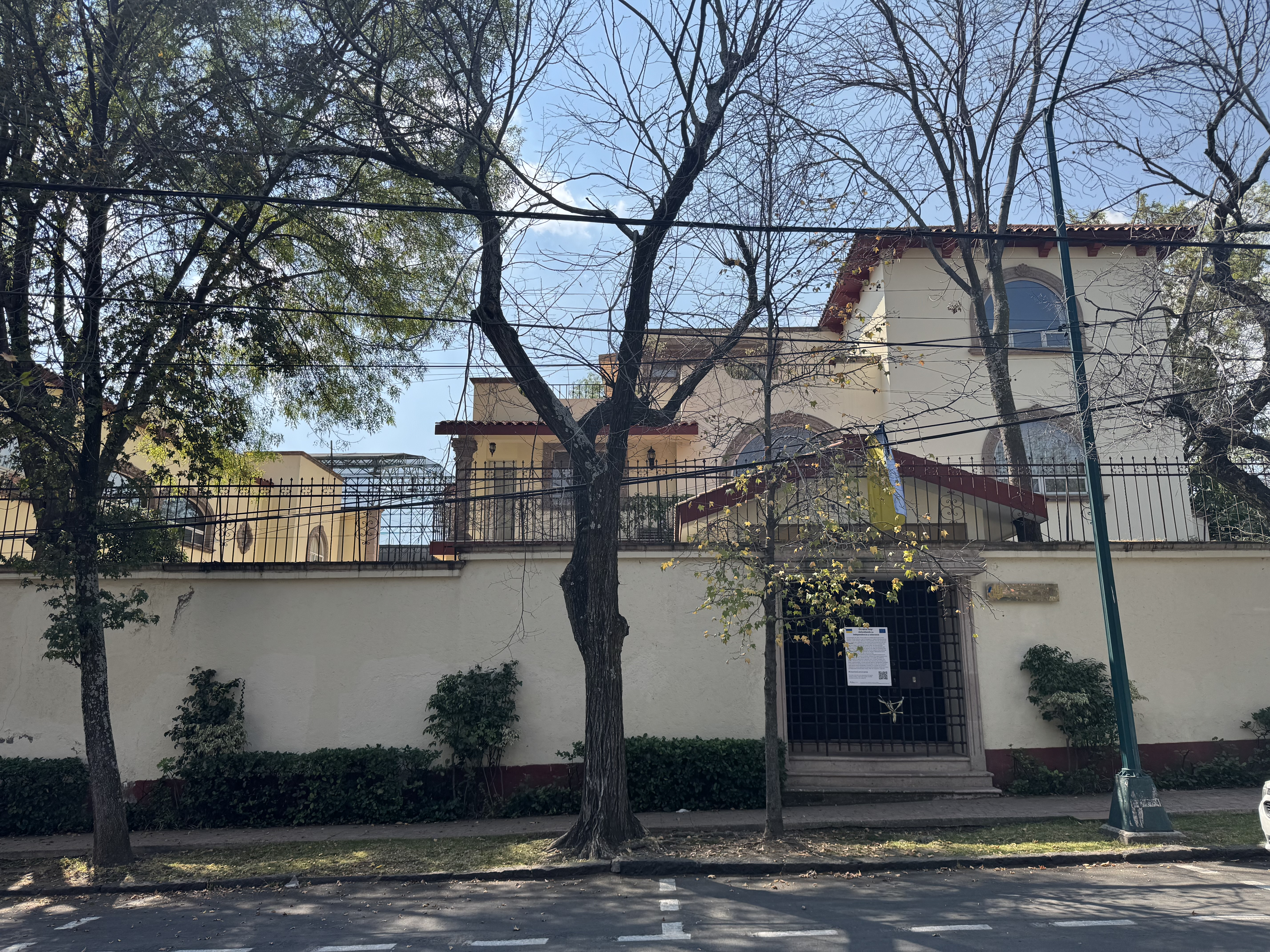
Embassy of Ukraine in Mexico City

== Gallery ==
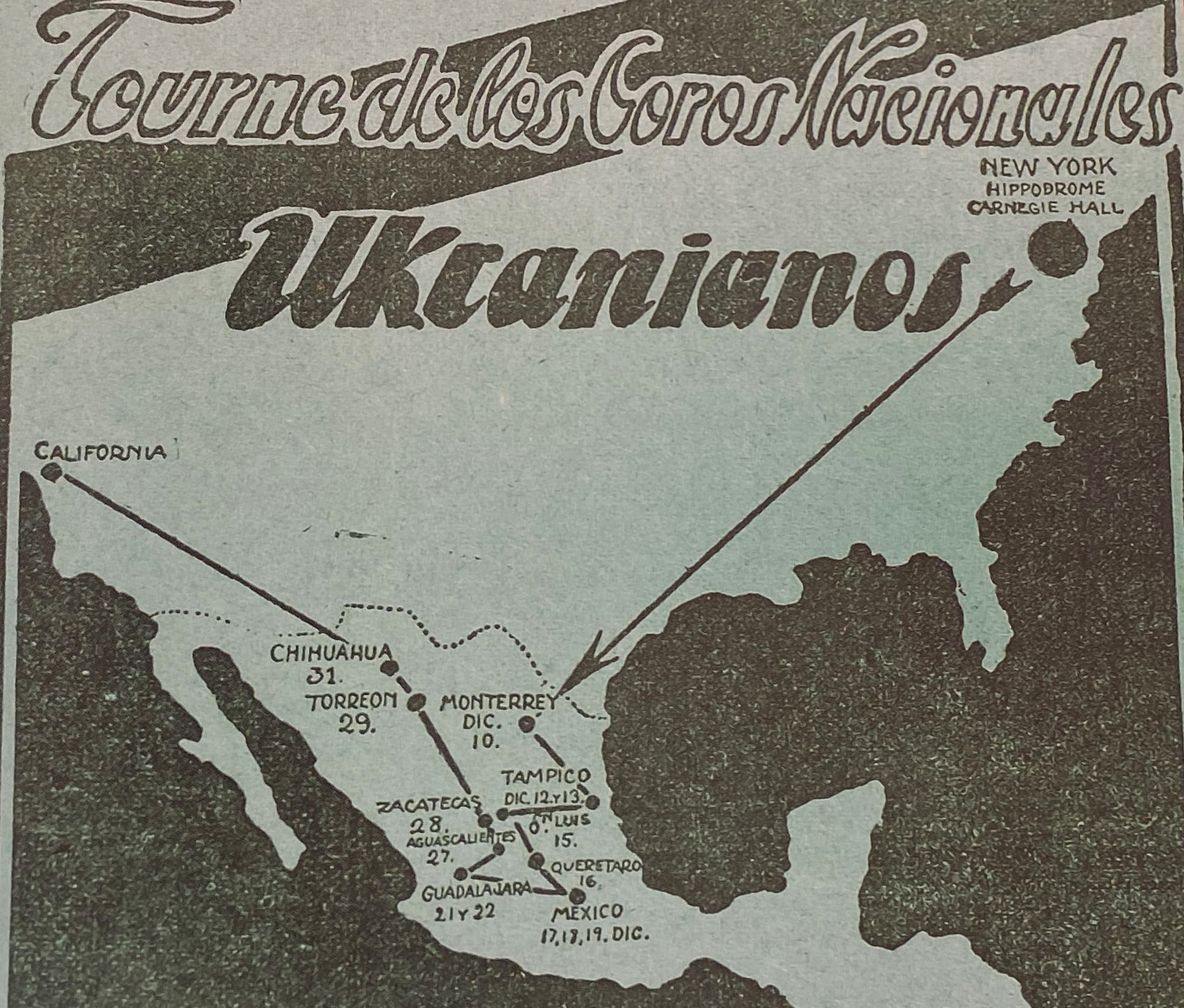
Tour of the Ukrainian Republic Capella in Mexico; 1922

Support for Ukraine in Mexico City; 2022

Mexican Ambassador Jose Antonio Zabalgoitia in the Netherlands arriving to the Ukraine Accountability Conference in The Hague; 2022

== See also ==
- Ukrainians in Mexico
