= Ukraine–European Union relations =

- European Union: Ukraine

Diplomatic mission
- European Union Delegation, Kyiv: Mission of Ukraine, Brussels

International relations between the European Union (EU) and Ukraine are shaped through the Ukraine–European Union Association Agreement and the Deep and Comprehensive Free Trade Area (DCFTA). Ukraine is a priority partner within the Eastern Partnership and the European Neighbourhood Policy (ENP). The EU and Ukraine developed an increasingly close relationship, going beyond co-operation, to gradual economic integration and deepening of political co-operation. On 23 June 2022, the European Council granted Ukraine the status of a candidate for accession to the European Union.

The association agreement was initiated in 2012, but the Ukrainian government suspended preparations for signing the association agreement on 21 November 2013, during the presidency of Viktor Yanukovych, who attended the EU summit in Vilnius on 28–29 November 2013, where the association agreement was originally planned to be signed. The decision to put off signing the association agreement led to the pro-EU Euromaidan movement. These led to the removal of Yanukovych and his government by parliament after the 2013–2014 Ukrainian revolution in February 2014.

The political part of the Association Agreement was signed on 21 March 2014, by Prime Minister, Arseniy Yatsenyuk. Meanwhile, the EU froze assets of Russians and Ukrainians suspected of corruption and granted financial aid to Ukraine. The economic part of the Ukraine–European Union Association Agreement was signed on 27 June 2014, by the new president, Petro Poroshenko. On 1 January 2016, Ukraine joined the DCFTA with the EU. Ukrainian citizens were granted visa-free travel to the Schengen Area for up to 90 days during any 180-day period on 11 June 2017, and the Association Agreement formally came into effect on 1 September 2017. On 21 February 2019, the Constitution of Ukraine was amended, the norms on the strategic course of Ukraine for membership in the European Union and NATO were enshrined in the preamble of the Basic Law, three articles and transitional provisions. On 28 February 2022, during the 2022 Russian invasion of Ukraine, Ukrainian President Volodymyr Zelenskyy officially signed an EU membership application for Ukraine. Prime Ministers Mateusz Morawiecki of Poland, Janez Janša of Slovenia and Petr Fiala of the Czech Republic, all being member states of the European Union, visited Kyiv and met with Ukrainian President Volodymyr Zelenskyy to express their solidarity and support during the invasion.

Ukraine shares borders with four EU member states; Hungary, Poland, Slovakia, and Romania—that stretch about 2,235 kilometres (1,389 mi) in total, with 33 border crossings by road, rail, ferry, and walking and bicycle path.

On 14 December 2023, the European Council agreed to open accession negotiations with Ukraine. Accession negotiations began on 25 June 2024, at the same time as those with Moldova.

== History ==
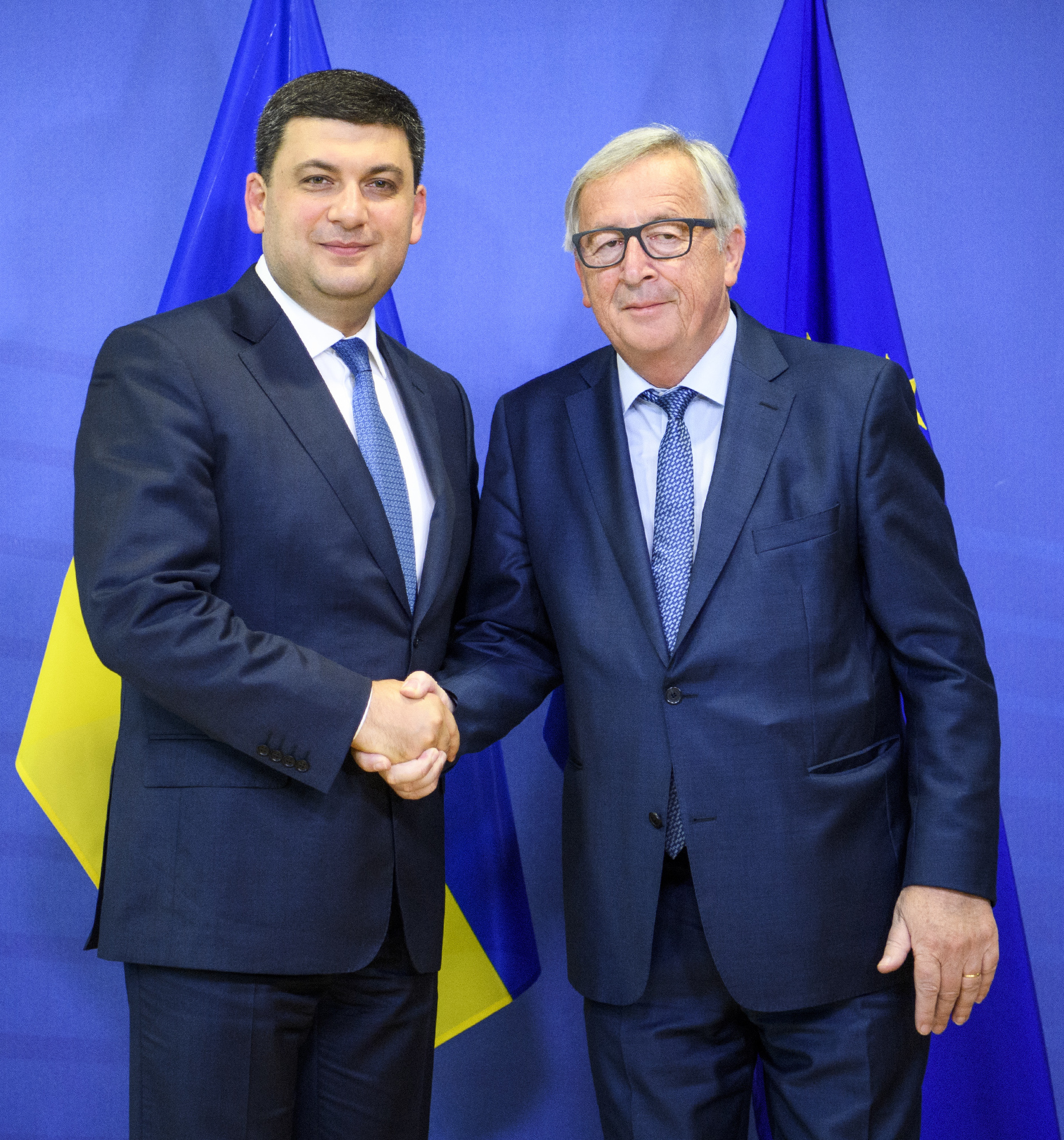
Ukrainian Prime Minister Volodymyr Groysman meets with President of the European Commission Jean-Claude Juncker in Brussels, 24 May 2018.

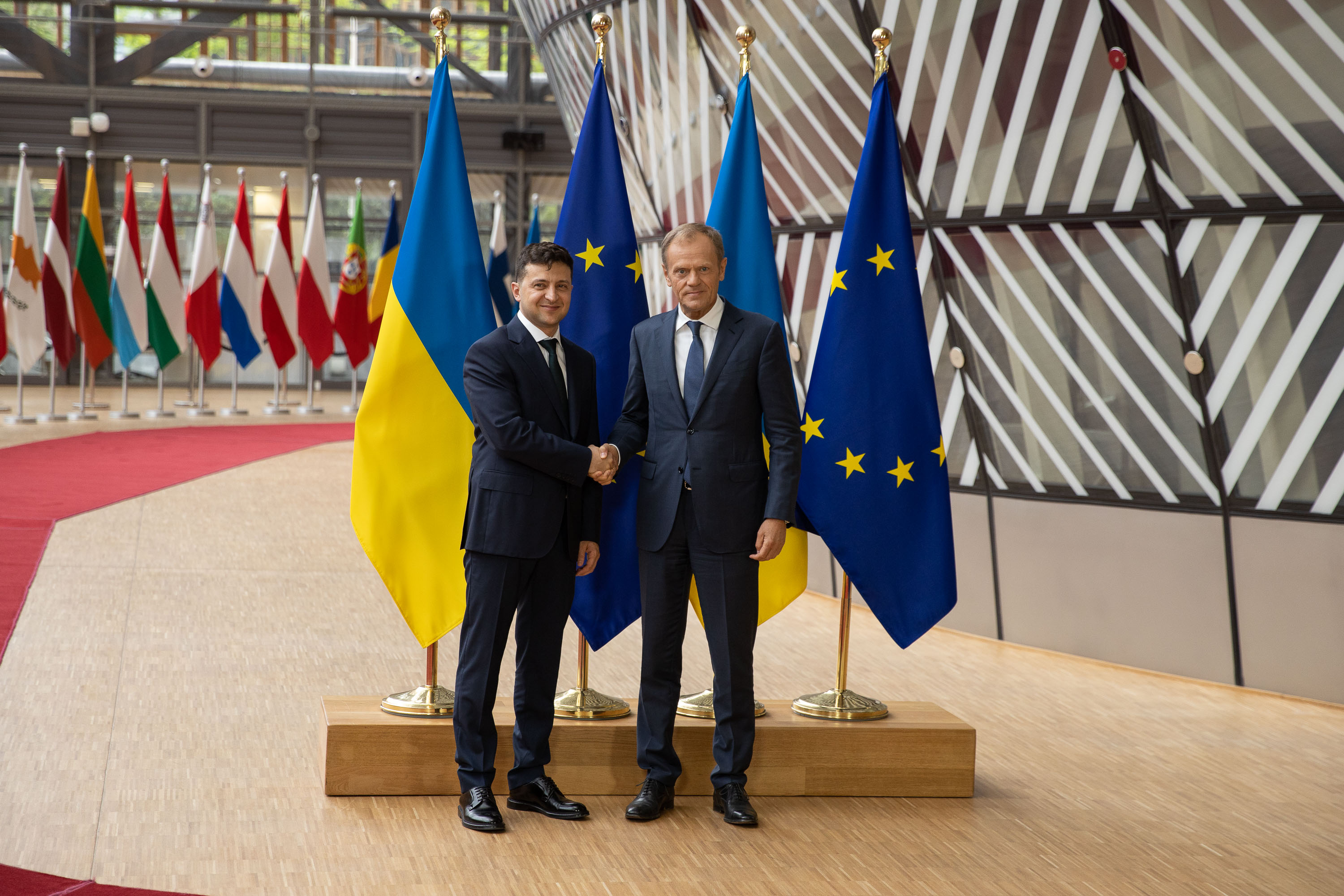
Ukrainian President Volodymyr Zelenskyy meets with President of the European Council Donald Tusk in Brussels, 5 June 2019.

=== Early relations ===
The European project has not been completed as yet. It has not been completed because there is no full-fledged participation of Ukraine. We envy Poland, but we believe that Ukraine will be in the European Union.

— PM Tymoshenko during celebrations of the 20th anniversary of the fall of communism in Poland (4 June 2009)

Ukraine's desire to join the European Union dates back to 1993 when the government declared that integration to the EU was the main foreign policy objective. The Delegation of the European Commission to Ukraine was opened in Kyiv in September 1993. In reality, little was done since Kyiv had to take into account that Russia was its major trade partner and natural gas and fossil energy supplier.

The political dialogue between the EU and Ukraine started in 1994 when the Partnership and Cooperation Agreement (PCA) was signed. That document was focused on economic and social issues and the necessity of conducting public administration reforms and guaranteeing free press and civil rights. The framework set for political discussions was a yearly meeting between EU Troika and Ukrainian leadership and some inter-ministerial consultations. The first EU–Ukraine summit took place in September 1997 in Kyiv. The Partnership and Cooperation Agreement of 1994 entered into force in 1998 and expired in 2008. During the second summit in October 1998 in Vienna, EU–Ukraine relations were defined as a strategic and unique partnership and Ukraine first declared its desire to acquire associate membership in the EU. None of the top-level meetings brought major changes to a reserved EU approach. Leaders focused chiefly on post-communism economic transition and human rights records as well as on issues connected to the Chernobyl nuclear power plant and its containment.

In 2002, EU Enlargement Commissioner Günter Verheugen said that membership within 10 to 20 years was a possibility. The same year Ukrainian President Leonid Kuchma stated that Ukraine would meet all EU membership requirements by 2007–2011.

=== Post-Orange Revolution relations ===
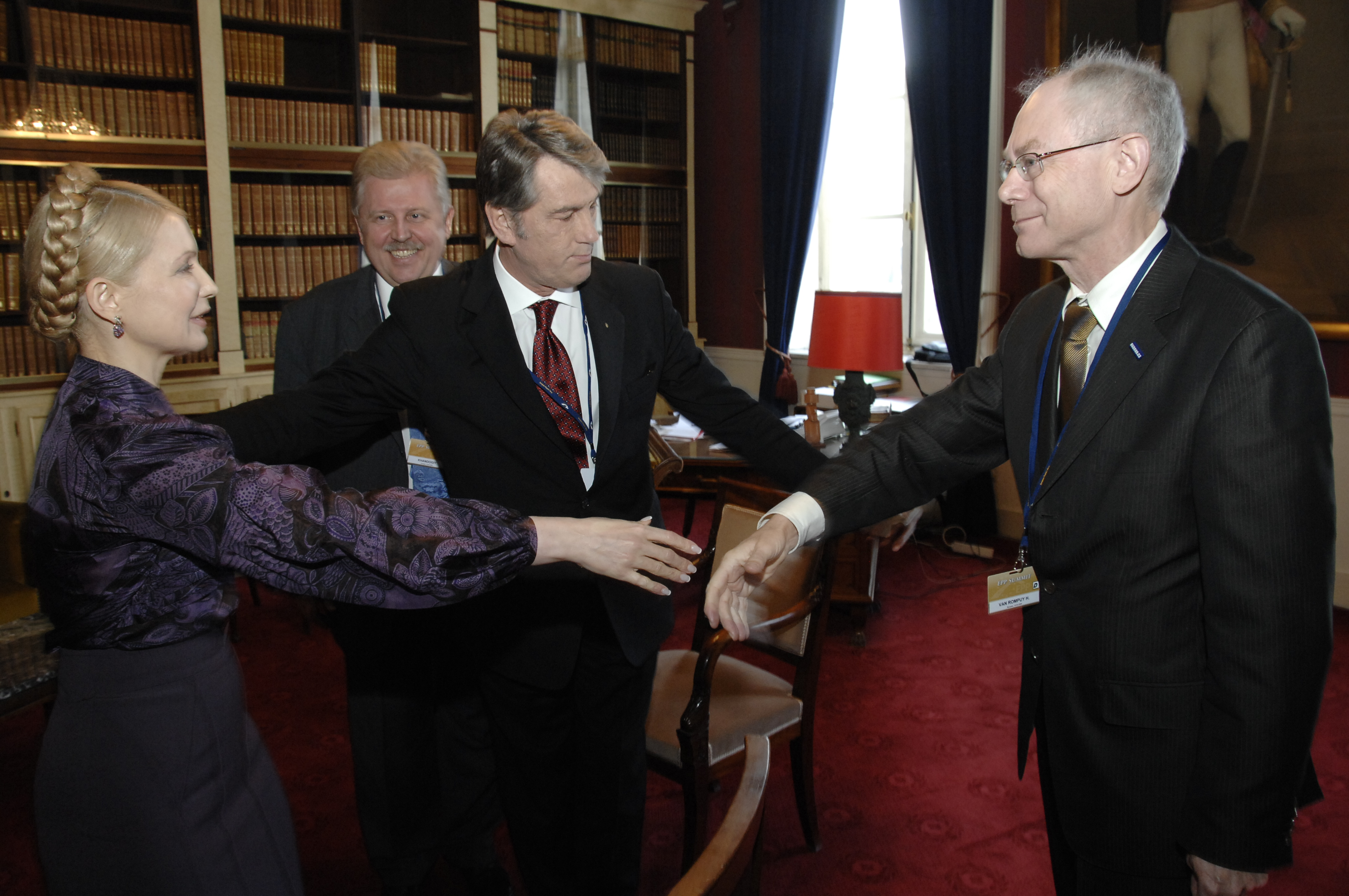
Left to right: then Ukrainian Prime Minister Yulia Tymoshenko and President Viktor Yushchenko meeting with European Council President Herman Van Rompuy in 2009

The Orange Revolution of late 2004 improved Ukraine's European prospects; the opposition leader Viktor Yushchenko hinted that he would press the EU for deeper ties and described a four-point plan: acknowledgment of Ukraine as a market economy, entry in the World Trade Organization, associate membership in the European Union, and, finally, full membership. Ukrainian President Viktor Yushchenko asked Brussels mid-December 2004 for a clearer indication of Ukraine's prospects for membership, saying that, "The approved Action Plan reflects only the level of Ukraine–EU relations that we could have reached before the presidential elections in 2004."

On 13 January 2005, the European Parliament almost unanimously (467 votes to 19 in favour) passed a motion stating the wish of the European Parliament to establish closer ties with Ukraine in view of the possibility of EU membership. The European Commission stated that future EU membership would not be ruled out. Several EU leaders stated strong support for closer economic ties with Ukraine.

On 21 March 2005, Polish Foreign Minister Adam Daniel Rotfeld noted that Poland will, in every way, promote Ukraine's desire to be integrated with the EU, achieve the status of a market-economy country, and join the World Trade Organization. He also said, "At the present moment, we should talk concrete steps in cooperation instead of engaging in empty talk about European integration." Three days later, a poll of the six largest EU nations conducted by a French research company showed that the European public would be more likely to accept Ukraine as a future EU member than any other country that is not currently an official candidate.

In October 2005, Commission president José Manuel Barroso said that the future of Ukraine is in the EU. On 9 November 2005, however, the European Commission in a new strategy paper suggested that the current enlargement agenda (Croatia and in the future the other ex-Yugoslavian countries) could block the possibility of a future accession of Ukraine, Armenia, Belarus, Georgia, and Moldova. Commissioner Olli Rehn said that the EU should avoid overexpansion, adding that the current enlargement agenda is already quite full.

According to the Ukrainian authorities, the ENP is not an adequate political instrument, since joining the EU was one of principal objectives of all governments since 1993. After the Orange Revolution of 2004 that brought to power Viktor Yushchenko, the EU commission was very slow to react: little progress was made to put the largest European country on a path to eventual membership.

==== Association negotiations ====
In March 2007, the EU and Ukraine started talks about a new "wider agreement", aiming at offering a legal framework for a closer economic cooperation and a better political dialogue. It was agreed that Ukraine and the EU would start a parallel negotiation concerning setting up a free trade area. Later in 2007, it was announced that this issue would be incorporated into the draft agreement as a separate chapter.

In our course, aimed at the full return of Ukraine into the united Europe, we do not need alternatives

— President Yushchenko at the XVI Summit of Central and East European Heads of States (19 June 2009)

Days before the summit, the Ministers of foreign affairs of Member States agreed during their meeting in Avignon (France) that association agreement to be signed with Ukraine will have nothing to do with the association agreements the EU signed with many Eastern European States (from Poland to Romania in the beginning of the 1990s, Western Balkans by the end of the 1990s). Media reported that the Netherlands, Belgium, Luxembourg and Germany were strongly opposed to including "Ukraine is a European State" into EU legally binding documents. This was considered a failure of Kuchma-era politician Mr. Roman Shpek, then Ukrainian ambassador to Brussels. He was replaced by Mr. Andriy Veselovsky, a more experienced diplomat.

A Joint EU–Ukraine Action Plan was endorsed by the European Council on 21 February 2005. It was based on the Partnership and Cooperation Agreement of 1994 and provided, according to the European Commission, a comprehensive and ambitious framework for joint of work with Ukraine in all key areas of reform.

Talks on a free trade agreement between Ukraine and the European Union started on 18 February 2008 between the Ukrainian government and the EU Trade Commissioner.

Portugal publicly stated it supports Ukraine's EU accession in July 2008.

On 22 July 2008, it was announced that a "Stabilisation and Association"-type agreement would be signed between Ukraine and the EU on 8 September 2008 in Évian-les-Bains.

=== Second Tymoshenko government ===
On 2 October 2008, Ukraine President Yushchenko announced that the Association agreement between the country and the EU would be signed "within six-eight months". On that day, he met with the King of Sweden Charles XVI Gustav, who paid a state visit to Kyiv. According to Yushchenko, "the agreement is half-ready, and he hopes that there will be a possibility to finalise and sign it under Swedish presidency in the EU." He also welcomed the initiative of Eastern Partnership suggested earlier by Polish and Swedish Foreign Ministers.

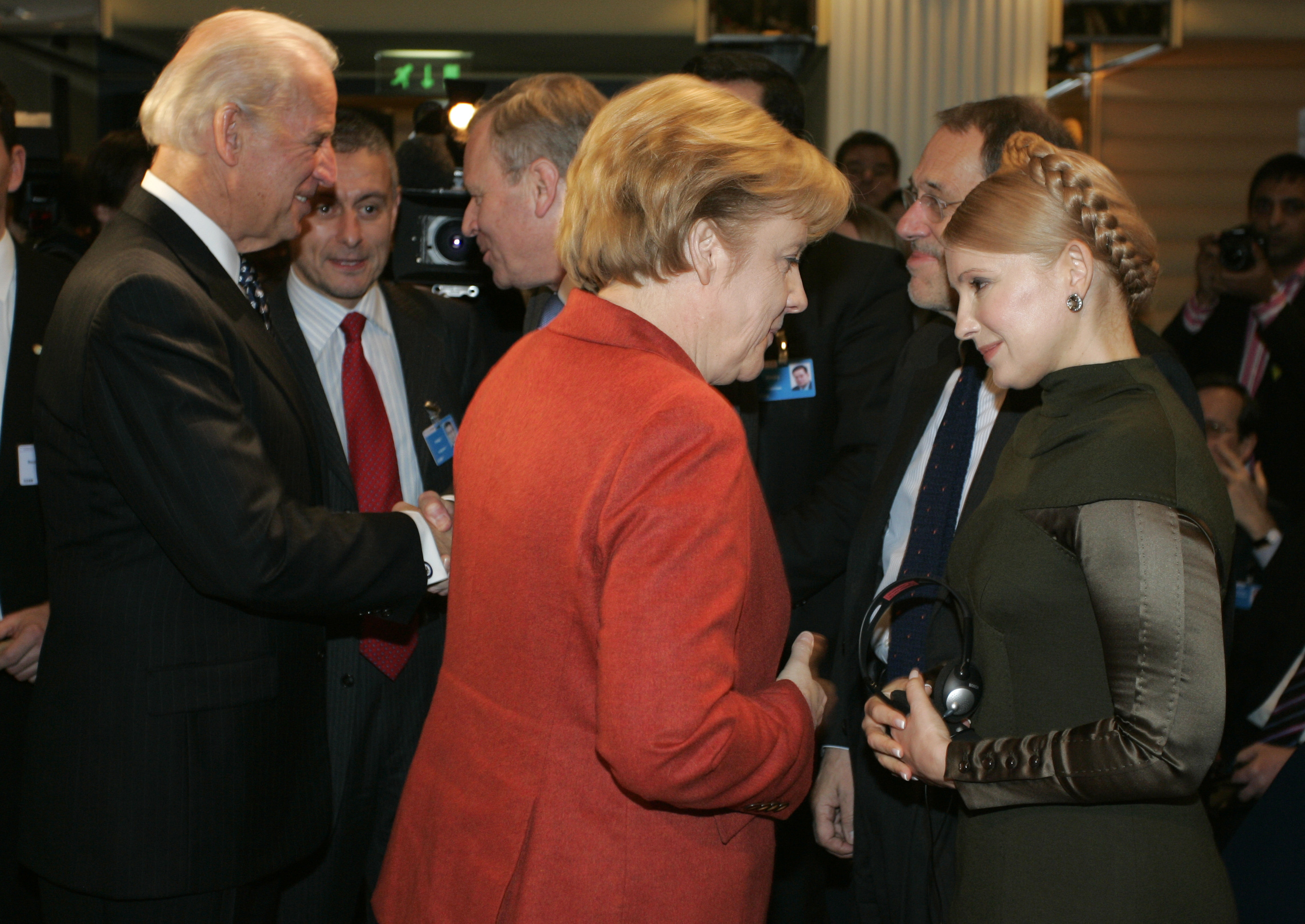
Angela Merkel (Chancellor of Germany) in Conversation with Yulia Tymoshenko (Prime Minister of Ukraine) during the 45th Munich Security Conference (7 February 2009)

On 20–24 October 2008, the EU and Ukraine held a negotiation round on the free trade area chapter of the Association agreement. According to some Ukrainian media, the "EU promised to liberalise trade relations". Ukraine's representative told that one must not "focus too much" on negotiation since there is much to be done by the Ukrainian government to meet certain criteria. He also said, that "soon, the Balkans will enter into the European trade space and therefore Ukraine might lose these markets". This was seen as a reason for Ukraine to move forward as least as soon as Balkans, the EU did not comment on that perception.

On 29 October 2008, the EU Commissioner Jacques Barrot and Ukrainian officials met in Brussels to launch negotiations on visa-free travel. Kyiv had been asking for a "road map" to visa lifting, including travel document security, irregular migration, public order and foreign relations. But the EU justice commissioner avoided to give any specific dates. Moreover, the Ukrainian side argued that the 2007 visa facilitation agreement is not fully implemented by the EU member states. The European Commission representative was quoted as saying that Brussels is ready to impose sanctions against those who do not respect the agreement. Spanish, Dutch, German and Belgian embassies were cited among the most active rule breakers. Making visa processing lengthy and expensive is one of the major agreement violations. On 28 October 2008, Belgian PM Yves Leterme told that Ukrainians need to avoid middlemen in visa procedures if they want to reduce their cost. The problem is that some consulates, including Belgian, oblige visa seekers to deal with a middleman.

According to Ukrainian President Yushchenko, some embassies of EU countries often require Ukrainians to present documents, which had not been foreseen in the agreement on simplification of visa regulations. Around five per cent of Ukrainians willing to travel to the EU are denied visas, which, according to Yushchenko, "does not meet the standards of our agreements with the EU."

On 4 June 2009, some media outlets reported that Germany's Free Democratic Party openly stated in its programme that Ukraine has the right for the EU membership in the long term. This was the first major German political party to state this.

On 16 June 2009, a new practical instrument was adopted—the EU-Ukraine Association Agenda.

In September 2009, high-ranking Ukrainian diplomats proposed that Ukraine apply for EU membership after the presidential election in January 2010, around March 2010, which would mean that the official response to the application would probably take place in early 2011 during the Polish presidency of the European Union. However, this has not happened.

On 5 October 2009, the Chairman of the Committee of the Verkhovna Rada on issues of European integration Borys Tarasiuk commented "the EU see the implementation of a free visa regime for Ukrainians travelling to member states of the European Union only as a long-term prospect". Ukrainian politicians continue to insist that the implementation of that free visa regime take place by 2012, when the European Football Championship will be held in Ukraine and Poland. According to Tarasiuk, the main obstacles to the implementation of a free visa regime between Ukraine and EU is the fact that Ukraine "hasn't finished its work on legislation concerning forming a demographic [database], which then could become a good basis for issuing biometric passports" and the fact that there is no general database on the issuing of foreign passports to Ukrainian citizens. According to Tarasiuk the EU fear that this grants the opportunity for mass falsification.

On 16 December 2009, the European Commission President Jose Manuel Barroso stated that "our Ukrainian friends need to do more if they want us to help them more". He also stated that "enlargement is not possible in the current situation".

==== Eastern Partnership (2009) ====
Members of the Eastern Partnership

Ukraine is one of six post-Soviet nations to be invited to cooperate with the EU within the new multilateral framework that the Eastern Partnership is expected to establish. However, Kyiv pointed out that it remains pessimistic about the "added value" of this initiative. Indeed, Ukraine and the EU have already started the negotiations on new, enhanced political and free-trade agreements (Association and Free-Trade Agreements). Also, there has been some progress in liberalising the visa regime despite persistent problems in the EU Member States' visa approach towards Ukrainians.

That is why Ukraine has a specific view of the Eastern Partnership project. According to the Ukrainian presidency, it should correspond, in case of his country, to the strategic foreign policy objective, i.e. the integration with the EU. Yet, the Eastern Partnership documents (the European Council Declaration of May 2009) do not confirm such priorities as political and economic integration or lifting visas.

Ukraine has expressed enthusiasm about the project. Ukraine deputy premier Hryhorii Nemyria said that the project is the way to modernise the country and that they welcome the Eastern Partnership policy, because it uses 'de facto' the same instruments as for EU candidates.

Under the Eastern Partnership, Poland and Ukraine have reached a new agreement replacing visas with simplified permits for Ukrainians residing within 30 km of the border. Up to 1.5 million people may benefit from this agreement, which took effect on 1 July 2009.

=== Viktor Yanukovych presidency ===
In May 2010, President Viktor Yanukovych promised to adopt in June 2010 the legislation necessary for creating a free trade zone between Ukraine and the European Union (EU). (Note: Late September 2013 President Yanukovych stated establishing a free trade zone between Ukraine and the EU "will have a significant positive impact on the economic situation in Europe at large and will help the process of Europe's emergence from the crisis" and that according to experts, this establishment would increase the EU market by almost 7%, the production of goods services in Europe by more than 1%, and the exports of European goods and services to the world markets by almost 1%.) Yanukovych expected visas between Ukraine and EU member states to be abolished and that a free trade zone will be created by March 2011.

The Azarov Government continued to pursue EU-integration. During May and June 2010, both Prime Minister Mykola Azarov and Ukrainian Foreign Minister Kostiantyn Hryshchenko stated that integration into Europe has been and remains the priority of domestic and foreign policy of Ukraine. The policies of the Azarov Government do not exclude EU integration, the EU Commissioner for Enlargement Štefan Füle stated on 12 May 2010.

"An action plan for Ukraine toward the establishment of a visa-free regime for short-stay travel" between the European Council and Ukraine was agreed on 22 November 2010. This roadmap requests major improvements in Ukrainian border control, migration and asylum policies.

Attempts to change the French constitution are currently being carried forward in order to remove the compulsory referendum on all EU accessions of countries with a population of more than 5% of the EU's total population; this clause would apply to Ukraine and Turkey.

==== Ukraine–European Union Association Agreement ====
The EU Association Agreement (AA) was initialed on 30 March 2012 in Brussels; but as of November 2012 the 27 EU governments and the European Parliament had yet to sign the accord. The treatment and sentencing (considered by EU leaders as a politically motivated trial) of former Prime Minister of Ukraine Yulia Tymoshenko have strained the relations between the EU and Ukraine. The European Union and several of its member states, notably Germany, have been pressuring Ukrainian President Viktor Yanukovich and his Azarov Government to halt the detention of Tymoshenko in fear of her degrading health. Several meetings with Yanukovich have been deserted by EU leaders, including the German president Joachim Gauck.

At the request of opposition politicians in Ukraine, EU government officials boycotted the UEFA Euro 2012 soccer championship in Ukraine. EU leaders have suggested that the AA, and the Deep and Comprehensive Free Trade Agreement, will not be ratified unless Ukraine addresses concerns over a "stark deterioration of democracy and the rule of law", including the imprisonment of Tymoshenko and Yurii Lutsenko in 2011 and 2012.

A 10 December 2012 statement by the EU Foreign Affairs Council "reaffirms its commitment to the signing of the already initialed Association Agreement, including a Deep and Comprehensive Free Trade Area, as soon as the Ukrainian authorities demonstrate determined action and tangible progress in the three areas mentioned above, possibly by the time of the Eastern Partnership Summit in Vilnius in November 2013". These three areas are: "Electoral, judiciary and constitutional reforms (in line with international standards are integral parts of it and commonly agreed priorities)."

Kostiantyn Yelisieiev, Ukraine's Ambassador to the EU, responded in February 2013 by rejecting any preconditions by the EU for signing the AA. However, on 22 February 2013 a resolution was approved by 315 of the 349 registered members of the Verkhovna Rada stating that "within its powers" the parliament would ensure that 10 December 2012 EU Foreign Affairs Council "recommendations" are implemented. At the 16th EU-Ukraine summit of 25 February 2013, President of the European Council Herman Van Rompuy followed up on the December 2012 EU Foreign Affairs Council statement by reiterating the EU's "call for determined action and tangible progress in these areas – at the latest by May, this year".

The same day President Yanukovych stated Ukraine will "do its best" to satisfy the EU's requirements. At the time President Yanukovych was also in negotiations with Russia to "find the right model" for cooperation with the Customs Union of Belarus, Kazakhstan and Russia. But also on 25 February 2013, President of the European Commission José Manuel Barroso made it clear that "one country cannot at the same time be a member of a customs union and be in a deep common free-trade area with the European Union".

To coordinate preparation of Ukraine for European integration, the Government of Ukraine has adopted a Plan on Priority Measures for European Integration of Ukraine for 2013. Successful implementation of the plan is assumed as one of the conditions necessary for signing of the Association Agreement, planned for 29 November 2013 during Eastern Partnership Summit in Vilnius.

In March 2013, Stefan Fuele, the EU's Commissioner for Enlargement, informed the European Parliament that while Ukrainian authorities had given their "unequivocal commitment" to address the issues raised by the EU, several "disturbing" recent incidents, including the annulment of Tymoshenko's lawyer Serhii Vlasenko's mandate in the Verkhovna Rada (Ukraine's parliament), could delay the signing of the agreements. However, the next day the Ukrainian Ministry of Foreign Affairs expressed its optimism that they would still be signed in November.

On 7 April 2013, a decree by President Yanukovych freed Lutsenko from prison and exempted him, and his fellow Minister in the second Tymoshenko Government Heorhii Filipchuk, from further punishment.

On 3 September 2013, (at the opening session of the Verkhovna Rada after the summer recess) President Yanukovych urged his parliament to adopt laws so that Ukraine will meet the EU criteria and it can sign the Association Agreement in November 2013.

On 18 September, the Ukrainian cabinet unanimously approved the draft association agreement.

On 25 September 2013, Chairman of the Verkhovna Rada Volodymyr Rybak stated that he was sure that his parliament would pass all the laws needed to fit the EU criteria for the Association Agreement since, except for the Communist Party of Ukraine, (Note: The Communist Party of Ukraine wants Ukraine to join the Customs Union of Belarus, Kazakhstan and Russia.) "The Verkhovna Rada has united around these bills."

On 20 November 2013, EU's Commissioner for Enlargement Fuele stated he expected that the Verkhovna Rada would consider and adopt the remaining bills necessary for the signing of the association agreement, planned for 29 November 2013, the next day.

==== Suspension of association agreement signature ====
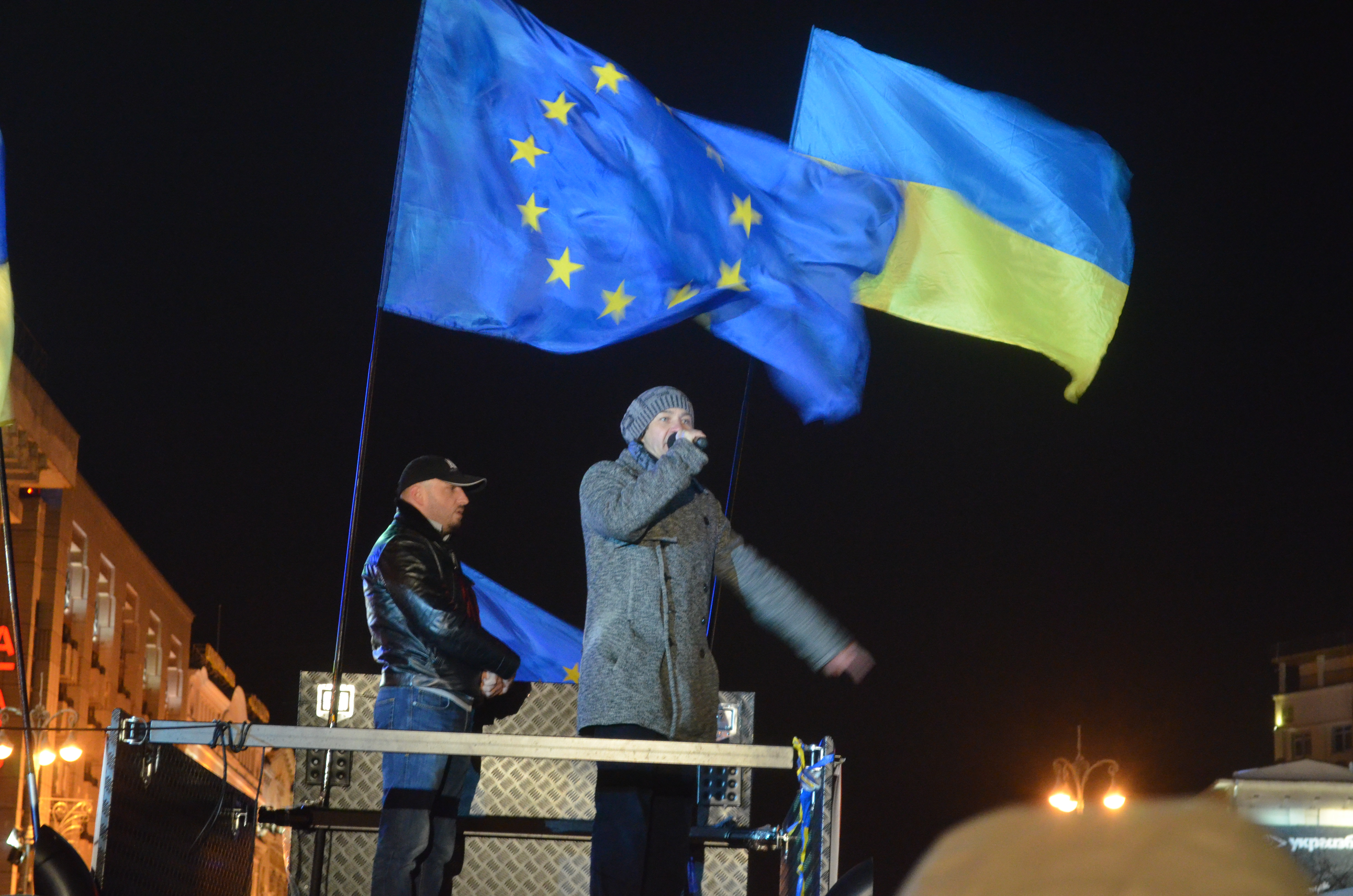
Euromaidan pro-EU protesters in Kyiv, December 2013

On 21 November 2013, the Verkhovna Rada failed to pass any of the six motions on allowing former Prime Minister Yulia Tymoshenko to receive medical treatment abroad, which was an EU demand for signing the association agreement. The same week Tymoshenko had stated that she was ready to ask the EU to drop the demand for her freedom if it meant President Viktor Yanukovych would sign the association agreement. The same day a Ukrainian government decree suspended preparations for signing of association agreement; instead it proposed the creation of a three-way trade commission between Ukraine, the European Union and Russia that would resolve trade issues between the sides. Prime Minister Mykola Azarov issued the decree in order to "ensure the national security of Ukraine" and in consideration of the possible ramifications of trade with Russia (and other CIS countries) if the agreement was signed on a 28–29 November summit in Vilnius.

The suspension of the association agreement signature initiated a wave of protests that would ultimately overthrow Viktor Yanukovych and his government.

==== Relations since suspension of association agreement till fall of Yanukovych ====
On 2 December 2013, President of the European Commission José Manuel Barroso agreed to meet with a delegation from Ukraine to discuss closer ties with the EU but stated there would be no re-opening of negotiations on the proposed Association Agreement. The same day First Vice Prime Minister of Ukraine Serhiy Arbuzov announced that Ukraine planned to sign a "roadmap" with the EU. "I'm not talking about the conditions of the association but about the conditions we planned to resolve before signing and after signing." Ukraine and the EU started "conducting technical preparations for the upcoming dialogue between Ukraine and the EU on certain aspects of the implementation of an Association Agreement" on 5 December 2013. However, on 15 December Fuele said that the Ukrainian government's negotiating position had "no grounds in reality" and that they were suspending further talks. Barroso said, "We are embarked on a long journey, helping Ukraine to become, as others, what we call now, 'new member states'. But we have to set aside short-term political calculations."

On 17 December, Ukraine signed a treaty with Russia under which Russia will buy $15 billion of Ukrainian Eurobonds and the cost of Russian natural gas supplied to Ukraine will be reduced, although Putin stated that "today we have not discussed the issue of Ukraine joining the Customs Union [of Belarus, Kazakhstan, and Russia] at all". (Note: Ukraine membership in the Customs Union of Belarus, Kazakhstan, and Russia would end the possibility for an Association Agreement according to statements made by European Commission President José Manuel Barroso in April 2011.) Three days later, high ranking EU-officials stated that the EU is still ready to sign the Association Agreement "as soon as Ukraine is ready for it", that the agreement was also beneficial for Russia and that the EU "is totally not concerned about the fact that Ukraine is signing agreements with Russia". On 23 December 2013, Russian presidential aide Yurii Ushakov stated "there is no contradiction" in Ukraine's association with the EU and their observer status in the Customs Union of Belarus, Kazakhstan, and Russia and the Eurasian Economic Union.

On 20 December 2013, Chairman of the Verkhovna Rada (Ukraine's parliament) Volodymyr Rybak did not rule out the possibility of signing an Association Agreement between Ukraine and the EU without the creation of a free trade area (FTA). On 24 December 2013, Minister of Foreign Affairs of Ukraine Leonid Kozhara stated that "at the present time" his Ministry's "and other government agencies' efforts are focused on further negotiations with the EU to provide conditions for implementing the association agreement". He added that "Ukraine will resume the negotiations on this agreement after the holidays" and that the text of the Association Agreement itself would not be changed, but that Ukraine intended to focus on the issues related to its implementation.

On 15 January 2014, Ukrainian Prime Minister Mykola Azarov gave an interagency (ministries and other agencies) working group two months to draw up a plan "on conditions of the implementation of the Association Agreement" for negotiations with the EU.

=== Euromaidan and ratification of the Association Agreement ===
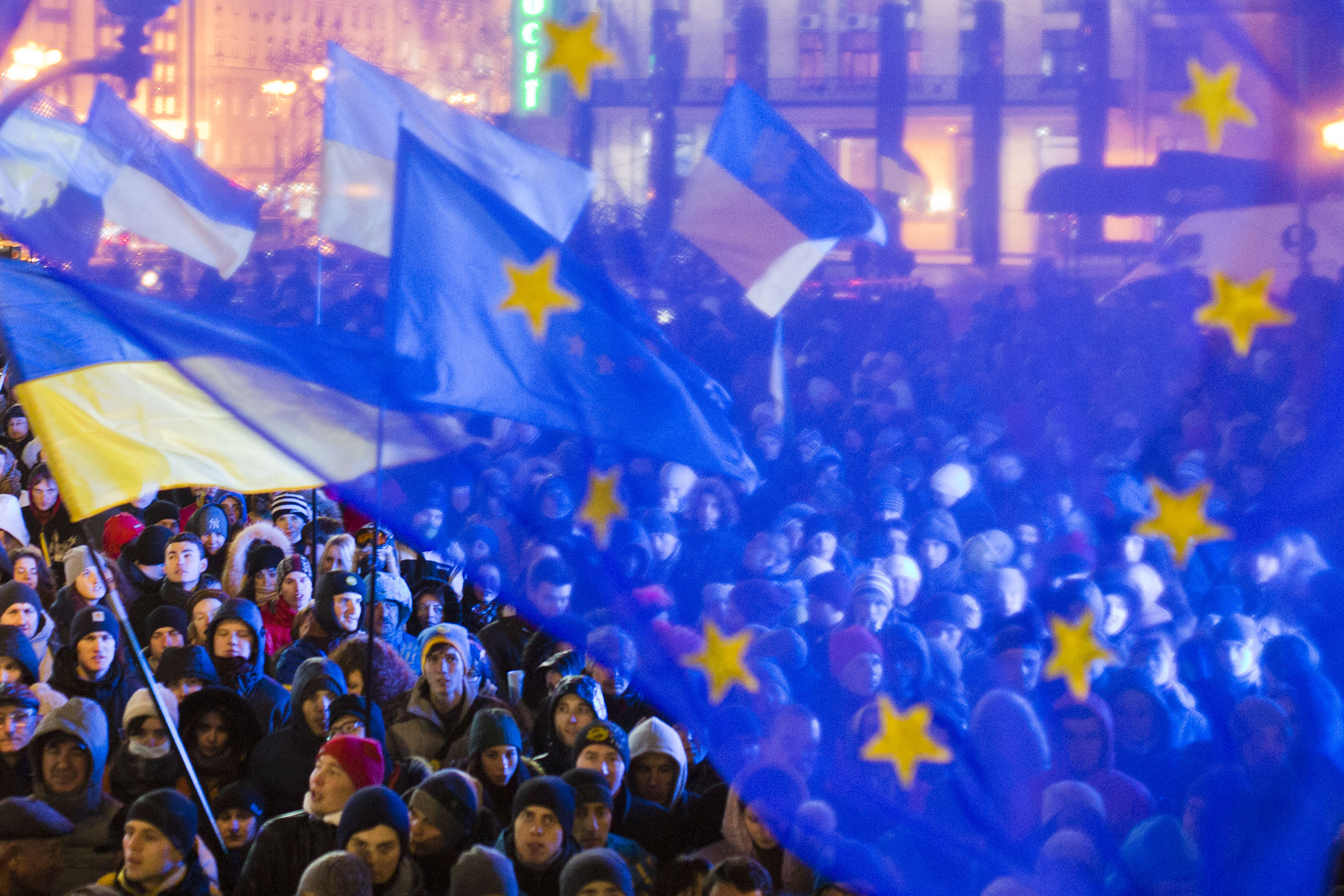
Pro-EU demonstration in Kyiv, 27 November 2013

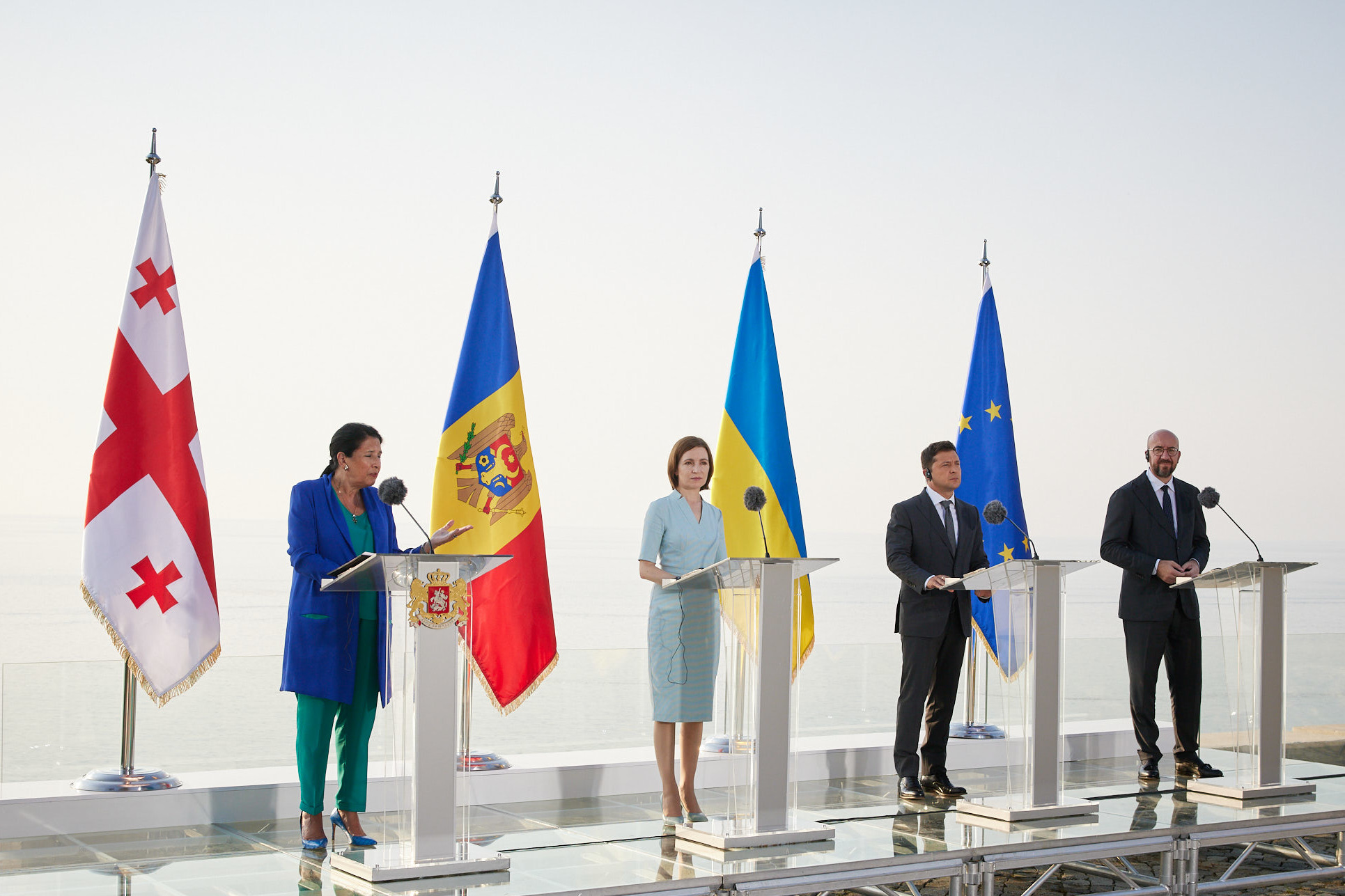
President of Georgia Salome Zourabichvili, President of Moldova Maia Sandu, President of Ukraine Volodymyr Zelenskyy and President of the European Council Charles Michel during the 2021 Batumi International Conference. In 2014, the EU signed Association Agreements with all the three states.

Viktor Yanukovych and his government were removed from their post by parliament after the Revolution of Dignity in February 2014. Following the ouster of Yanukovych, Russia invaded Crimea and the war in Donbas started. In March 2014, the EU condemned the Annexation of Crimea by Russia and Russia's "clear violation of Ukrainian sovereignty and territorial integrity by acts of aggression by the Russian armed forces". The EU also froze (and tried to recover) "misappropriated Ukrainian state funds" and froze assets and blocked entry into the EU of Russians and Ukrainians deemed responsible for the unrest in Ukraine. The political part of the Association Agreement was signed on 21 March 2014 by new Prime Minister Arsenii Yatseniuk, with the remaining parts of the agreement concerning free trade being deferred pending May elections. Customs duties for Ukrainian exports to the EU were temporarily removed in April 2014. Financial help was also promised to Ukraine. Ukraine was granted a macro-financial aid bilateral loan of one billion Euro in May 2014. Following the election, new President of Ukraine Petro Poroshenko and the European Union signed the economic part of the Association Agreement on 27 June 2014. President of the European Council Herman Van Rompuy described the signing as a "great day for Europe". Signatory (then new) President of Ukraine Petro Poroshenko called it "Ukraine is underlining its sovereign choice in favour of membership of the EU", and also described it as Ukraine's "first but most decisive step" towards EU membership. Poroshenko also set 2020 as a target for an EU membership application. As the Voice of America reported on 27 June, "Terms of the EU agreements require Georgia, Moldova and Ukraine not enter into similar free trade agreements with the Kremlin." On 16 September 2014, the Verkhovna Rada approved the draft law on ratification of the Association Agreement between Ukraine and the European Union, which was signed the same day by President Petro Poroshenko.

Same year, EU and Ukraine, upon Ukrainian Government's request, agreed to establish European Union Advisory Mission Ukraine (EUAM Ukraine), which is a civilian Common Security & Defence Policy mission of the EU for Ukraine's civilian security sector reform that formally began operating in Ukraine on 1 December 2014. EUAM Ukraine, employing over 300 personnel working in main headquarters in Kyiv, as well as in field offices in Lviv, Kharkiv and Odesa and a Mobile Unit today, provides strategic advice and practical support to Ukrainian counterparts. By working with a number of law-enforcement and rule of law agencies (Ministry of Internal Affairs, National Police, National Anti-Corruption Agency, State Border Guard Service, State Bureau of Investigations to name but a few), EUAM Ukraine aims to make civilian security sector more efficient, transparent and enjoying public trust.

The 17th EU-Ukraine summit took place on 27 April 2015 in Kyiv. During an Eastern Partnership summit in Riga in May 2015, EU agreed on a €1.8 bln loan to Ukraine. On 1 January 2016, the Deep and Comprehensive Free Trade Area between Ukraine and the EU entered into force. By April 2016, the Association Agreement had been ratified by Ukraine and all EU member states except the Netherlands, which held a referendum on approval of the treaty. Following the rejection of the agreement in the referendum, Prime Minister of the Netherlands Mark Rutte said that ratification would be put on hold during negotiations with the other parties to the treaty to find a compromise. In December 2016, a decision of the heads of state or government of the EU member states was approved which made legally binding interpretations of the agreement to address the concerns raised in the referendum. In particular, it stated that it did not commit the EU to grant Ukraine EU membership candidate status, provide security guarantees, military of financial aid, or free movement within the EU. The decision would enter into force if the Netherlands ratified the agreement, which needed to be approved by its parliament. In late January 2017, the Dutch government introduced a bill to confirm approval of the agreement. The Dutch House of Representatives approved the bill on 23 February 2017. The Senate approved the bill on 30 May 2017.

During the 23rd Ukraine-European Union Summit, on 12 October 2021, the Prime Minister of Ukraine Denys Shmyhal, the Vice President of the European Commission, the High Representative of the European Union for Foreign Affairs and Security Policy Josep Borrell and the Ambassador Extraordinary and Plenipotentiary of Slovenia to Ukraine Tomaž Mentsin signed an agreement between Ukraine and the European Union and its member states on the Common Aviation Area.

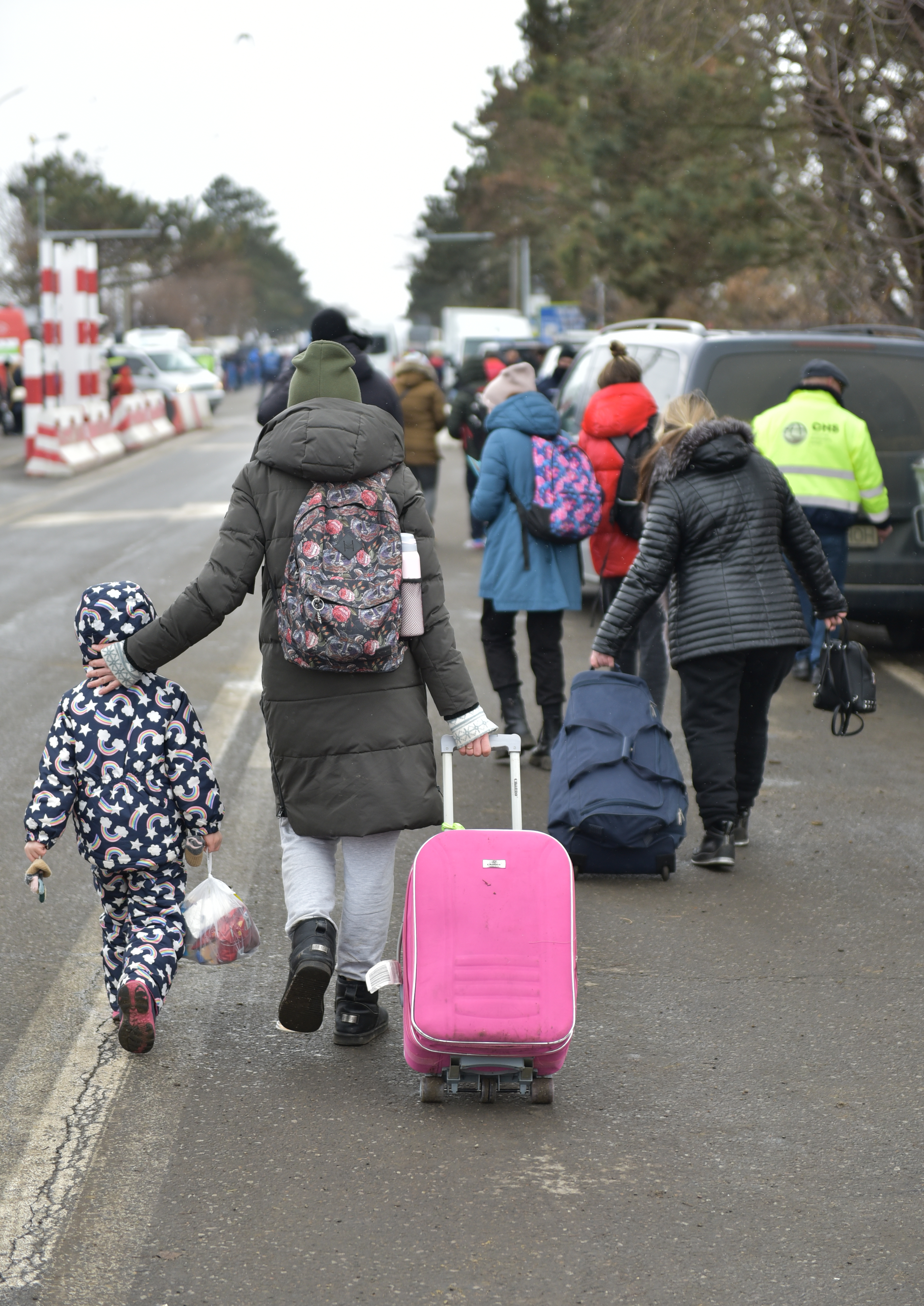
Ukrainian refugees entering Romania, 5 March 2022

In March 2022, the Council of the European Union invoked the Temporary Protection Directive for the first time in its history, in response to the refugee crisis caused by the Russian invasion of Ukraine.

On 27 April 2022, the EU Commission proposed to temporarily drop all its tariffs on imports from Ukraine to help Ukrainian industry weather Russian aggression.

On 29 May 2022, in order to support Ukraine's path to the European future, in particular to obtain the status of a candidate for membership in the European Union on 25–26 June 2022, the Government of Ukraine launched a communication campaign «Embrace Ukraine. Strengthen the Union».

On 31 March 2026, the EU's statistics agency Eurostat recorded a total of 4.33 million Ukrainians living in the bloc under temporary protection status. The countries hosting the largest numbers of refugees under this framework were Germany (nearly 1.3 million), Poland (950,000), and the Czech Republic (380,000). On 26 June 2026, the European Commission formally proposed extending the temporary protection framework for displaced Ukrainians until March 2028. At the request of Kyiv, the proposal introduced restrictions excluding newly arriving Ukrainian men of military age from receiving automatic temporary protection status.

== Legal instruments ==
=== Partnership and Cooperation Agreement (1994) ===
The political dialogue between the EU and Ukraine started in 1994 when the Partnership and Cooperation Agreement (PCA) was signed. That document was focused on economic and social issues as well as on the necessity of improving public government and guaranteeing free press and civil rights. The framework set for political discussions was modest: yearly meeting between EU Troika and Ukrainian leadership and some inter ministerial consultations. The Partnership and Cooperation Agreement of 1994 entered into force in 1998 and expired in 2008. None of the top level meetings brought any major changes to a reserved EU approach. Leaders focused chiefly on economic transition and human rights records as well as on issues connected to the Chernobyl nuclear power plant and its containment.

=== European Neighbourhood Policy (ENP) ===
| ENP partner | EU contract | FTA provisions | Country Report | Action Plan | Adoption by the EU | Adoption by the ENP partner | AP duration | CFSP invitation (Note: The EU may invite the ENP partner to align itself with EU declarations in the field of Common Foreign and Security Policy on a case-by-case basis. Currently, in addition to ENP partners the EU invites for alignment the candidate countries, SAp and EFTA states. Each states decides on a case-by-case basis if to align itself with the particular declaration it is invited to.) | EU aspiration (Note: The EU takes note of expressed European aspirations by the ENP partner.) | Sub-group |
|---|---|---|---|---|---|---|---|---|---|---|
| Ukraine (Note: Ukraine's deputy foreign affairs minister announced that with the adoption of the action plan for the association agreement between EU and Ukraine, the country effectively quits ENP in favour of stronger ties with the EU. The EU ENP website, however, still shows Ukraine as a participating country as of 21 June 2009.) | PCA, March 1998 | No | May 2004 | End 2004 | 21 February 2005 | 21 February 2005 | 3 years | Yes (Note: Not envisioned in the Action Plan, but invitations sent and accepted by Ukraine.) | Yes | East |

sources: Wayback Machine, European Commission - Press release - European Neighbourhood Policy: A year of progress, ENP official page EEAS - European External Action Service

A Joint EU–Ukraine Action Plan was endorsed by the European Council on 21 February 2005. It was based on the Partnership and Cooperation Agreement of 1994 and provided, according to the European Commission, a comprehensive and ambitious framework for joint work with Ukraine in all key areas of reform.

==== Eastern Partnership (EaP) ====
The Eastern Partnership is a forum aiming to improve the political and economic trade-relations of the six Post-Soviet states of "strategic importance"—Ukraine, Belarus, Moldova, Azerbaijan, Armenia and Georgia with the European Union. The EU draft of the EaP states that, "Shared values including democracy, the rule of law, and respect for human rights will be at its core, as well as the principles of market economy, sustainable development and good governance." The Partnership is to provide the foundation for new Association Agreements between the EU and those partners who have made sufficient progress towards the principles and values mentioned.

Ukraine is one of six post-Soviet nations to be invited to cooperate with the EU within the new multilateral framework that the Eastern partnership is expected to establish. However, Kyiv pointed out that it remains pessimistic about the "added value" of this initiative. Indeed, Ukraine and the EU have already started the negotiations on new, enhanced political and free-trade agreements (Association and Free-Trade Agreements). Also, there has been some progress in liberalising the visa regime despite persistent problems in the EU Member States' visa approach towards Ukrainians.

That is why Ukraine has a specific view of the Eastern Partnership Project. According to the Ukrainian presidency, it should correspond, in case of his country, to the strategic foreign policy objective, i.e. the integration with the EU. Yet, the Eastern Partnership documents (the European Council Declaration of May 2009) do not confirm such priorities as political and economic integration or lifting visas.

Ukraine has expressed enthusiasm about the project. Ukraine deputy premier Hryhorii Nemyria said that the project is the way to modernise the country and that they welcome the Eastern Partnership policy, because it uses 'de facto' the same instruments as for EU candidates.

Under the Eastern Partnership, Poland and Ukraine have reached a new agreement replacing visas with simplified permits for Ukrainians residing within 30 km of the border. Up to 1.5 million people may benefit from this agreement which took effect on 1 July 2009.

=== Negotiations of an Association Agreement (AA) ===
An Association agreement (AA) between Ukraine and the EU was negotiated from 2009 to 2011, and should replace the existing PCA. The AA aims for political association and economic integration, includes a "deep and comprehensive free trade area", and runs parallel to the negotiations for a visa-free regime. It does not contain a membership perspective for Ukraine, although it recalls it as "a European country with European identity" and says that "the EU acknowledged the European aspirations of Ukraine".

On 16 June 2009, a new practical instrument was adopted—the EU-Ukraine Association Agenda. 19 December 2011 EU-Ukraine summit, which was intended to lead to the signature of the Agreement, fell short due to the EU's concerns over the jailing of former premier Yulia Tymoshenko. The end of negotiations were announced, but the text of the agreement was not signed with EU leaders deciding to wait until the October 2012 Parliamentary elections as a test of the vitality of democracy and rule of law in Ukraine. The AA was initialed shortly thereafter, on 30 March 2012. Before it enters into force it must be ratified by the Ukrainian Parliament, the European Parliament, and each EU member state. However, EU leaders have suggested that the agreement will not be ratified unless Ukraine addresses concerns over a "stark deterioration of democracy and the rule of law", including the imprisonment of Yulia Tymoshenko and Yurii Lutsenko in 2011 and 2012. In November 2012, EU Commissioner for Enlargement and European Neighbourhood Policy Stefan Fule stated that the AA, and DCFTA, could be signed in November 2013 if the EU's concerns were addressed.

However, in February 2013 Fule warned Ukraine that the agreements could be abandoned if the required reforms are not made quickly. He also stated that Ukrainian membership in the Customs Union of Belarus, Kazakhstan and Russia would be incompatible with the agreements with the EU.

==== Deep and Comprehensive Free Trade Agreement (DCFTA) ====
While work on signing a deep and comprehensive free trade agreement between Ukraine and the EU first began in 1999, formal negotiations between the Ukrainian government and the EU Trade Commissioner were not launched until 18 February 2008 . As of May 2011 there remained three outstanding issues to be resolved in the free trade deal: quotas on Ukrainian grain exports, access to the EU's services market and geographical names of Ukrainian commodities. Aside from these issues, the deal was ready. Despite those outstanding issues, Ukraine was ready to sign the agreement as it stood. Although it wanted stronger wording on enlargement prospects and access to the EU market for its truckers, Ukraine had more than many other candidates at the equivalent stage of the process. The finalised agreement was initialed on 19 July 2012. Ratification of the DCFTA, like the AA, has been stalled by the EU concerns over the rule of law in Ukraine. This includes the application of selective justice, as well as amending electoral laws. As a result, the role of Ukrainian oligarchs in sanctioning the agreement was also questioned.

If Ukraine would choose the agreement, the Eurasian Economic Commission's Customs Union of Belarus, Kazakhstan and Russia would withdraw from free trade agreements with the country, according to Russian presidential advisor Sergei Glazyev. However, on 21 November 2013 a Ukrainian government decree suspended preparations for signing the agreement (Note: Ukrainian Prime Minister Mykola Azarov stated that the problem that finally blocked the EU deal were conditions proposed for an International Monetary Fund loan being negotiated at the same time, which would require big budget cuts and a 40% increase in gas bills. On 7 December 2013 the IMF clarified that it was not insisting on a single-stage increase in natural gas tariffs in Ukraine by 40%, but recommended that they be gradually raised to an economically justified level while compensating the poorest segments of the population for the losses from such an increase by strengthening targeted social assistance. The same day IMF Resident Representative in Ukraine Jerome Vacher stated that this particular IMF loan is worth 4 billion US Dollars and that it would be linked with "policy, which would remove disproportions and stimulated growth".) that was scheduled to be signed during a 28–29 November 2013 EU summit in Vilnius, and it was not signed. (Note: Ukraine and the EU started "conducting technical preparations for the upcoming dialogue between Ukraine and the EU on certain aspects of the implementation of an Association Agreement" on 5 December 2013.) The decision to put off signing the association agreement led to 2013–2014 Ukrainian revolution.

EU sanctions against Russia related to its military intervention in eastern Ukraine have been extended until July 2016. On 1 January 2016, the DCFTA entered into force.

==== Visa liberalisation dialogue and visa-free regime ====
- 2006 Readmission Agreement
- 2007 Visa Facilitation Agreement
- 2010 Visa Liberalisation Action Plan

On 22 November 2010, the European Council and Ukraine announced "an action plan for Ukraine toward the establishment of a visa-free regime for short-stay travel". This roadmap outlined major improvements in Ukrainian border control, migration and asylum policies. According to The Wall Street Journal, for the EU, "the visa-free regimes are a key tool for binding their neighbors closer and for advancing reforms in those countries." Negotiations for an amendment to the 2007 Visa Facilitation agreement, which expanded the subset of individuals eligible for simplified visa procedures to include students, NGO representatives and holders of official passports, were finalised in December 2011, and the Visa Facilitation Agreement was ratified by the Verkhovna Rada on 22 March 2013. On 18 April 2013, the European Parliament followed suit, and the European Council finalised the agreement on 13 May 2013.

In December 2011, Ukrainian President Viktor Yanukovych expected negotiations for full visa-free travel to be completed by the end of 2014. The European Commission stated in November 2013 that Ukraine must strengthen its anti-discrimination laws before the visa-free regime is established. The Verkhovna Rada (Ukraine's parliament) adopted the remaining four bills needed for the transition to the second (implementation) phase of the Visa Liberalisation Action Plan in May 2014 (including bills on improving anti-discrimination laws). When addressing MPs before the vote on these bills Verkhovna Rada Chairman and acting President Oleksandr Turchynov predicted then that "the visa-free regime will be introduced by the end of this year". However, Ukraine should have adopted bills that addresses for six conditions (Note: The six conditions are: 1. 1. Security of Documents; 2. 2. Refugee Policy; 3. 3. Fighting Against Discrimination; 4. 4. Fighting Against Drugs Dealers, Organised Crime in Ukraine and Terror Acts; 5. 5. Fight Against Corruption in Ukraine; 6. 6. Safety of Internally Displaced people and Personal Data) needed for the fulfilment of the Visa Liberalization Action Plan before 15 December 2015. On that day the EU will decide whether the country will get the visa-free regime in 2016. In December 2015, the Commission issued a progress report that found that Ukraine met all the conditions for its citizens be granted visa free travel to the Schengen Area.

The European Commission formally proposed Ukraine be granted visa free travel in April 2016. This was later delayed by the EU, postponing the possible date of an agreement to September 2016. The Committee of Permanent Representatives gave its approval in November 2016. Visa-free scheme, that will allow Ukrainians with a biometric passport to visit the Schengen Area for a period of stay of 90 days in any 180-day period, would come into force once it is agreed and formally adopted by the European Parliament and the European Council. In December, the EU agreed that European Commission or an EU state will be able to suspend the visa waiver for Ukrainians for up to nine months in case of emergencies, such as if "[Ukraine fails] to cooperate in taking back illegal migrants, there's a spike in the number of asylum applications, or a security issue arises". The visa-free regime deal was agreed by the EU Parliament and Council on 28 February 2017, approved by the MEPs on 6 April and by the European Council on 11 May. It entered into force on 11 June 2017.

=== Energy Charter Treaty and Energy Community ===
Both Ukraine and all EU member states are signatories of the Energy Charter Treaty (ECT), a legally-binding treaty negotiated following the 1991 Energy Charter political declaration of principles for international energy including trade, transit and investment. The ECT was signed in December 1994 and came into effect in April 1998. Ukraine and all EU member states are also signatories of the 1998 Trade Amendment reflecting the change from the GATT to the WTO.

After its entry into force, Ukraine held an Observer status for the Treaty establishing the Energy Community (also referred as European Energy Community), a community established between the European Union (EU) and a number of third countries in order to extend the EU internal energy market to South East Europe and beyond. The Treaty establishing the Energy Community was signed in Athens, Greece, on 25 October 2005, and entered into force on 1 July 2006. Ukraine soon expressed its interest in full membership. Mandated by the Energy Community Ministerial Council, the European Commission had the first round of formal negotiations with Ukraine in late 2008. After three negotiation rounds, the technical negotiations with Ukraine were concluded in 2009. The Ministerial Council, however, made the membership conditional on legislative amendments. In concrete, it requested Ukraine to revise its gas law so that it complies with EU's Gas Directive 2003/55/EC. Following the amendment of the gas law in July 2010, Ukraine signed the Energy Community Accession Protocol on 24 September 2010, ratified the Treaty on 15 December 2010 and officially acceded the Energy Community on 1 February 2011.

== Economic relations ==
During the 1990s, Germany, the Netherlands and Italy remained major trading partners of Ukraine. According to Eurostat, between 2000 and 2007 EU trade in goods with Ukraine more than tripled in value: exports rose from 5.5 bn Euro to 22.4 bn, while imports increased from 4.8 bn Euro to 12.4 bn. Nevertheless, this increase did not make Ukraine one of the EU's major trading partners. In 2007, Ukraine accounted for only 2% of EU exports and a mere 1% of European Union imports which is toward the bottom of the EU's top 20 trading partners (16th).

According to the European commission paper, trade with Ukraine is dominated by manufactured goods. Nearly half of the EU exports to Ukraine in 2007 were machinery and vehicles and a further quarter were other manufactured articles. A quite similar structure can be seen in imports: unspecified manufactured articles accounted for two-fifths followed by a crude metal for a further fifth. At the more detailed level, the main EU exports to Ukraine in 2007 were medicine, motor vehicles and mobile phones, while the main imports were iron and steel products, as well as sunflower seed oil, ferro-nickel, iron ores and oil.

Among the EU27 Members States, Germany (5.9 bn Euro or 26% of EU exports) was the largest exporter, followed by Poland (4.1 bn or 18%). Italy (2.4 bn or 19%) was the largest importer followed by Bulgaria (1.6 bn or 13%) and Germany (1.3 bn or 11%).

The largest surpluses in trade with Ukraine in 2007 were observed in Germany (+ 4.6 bn Euro) and Poland (+2.8 bn Euro) while Bulgaria scored the highest deficit ( -1.4 bn Euro).

=== EU Financial Assistance to Ukraine ===
For the 2000–2006 budgetary period, the financial assistance of the EU to Ukraine was framed in the Technical Assistance to the Commonwealth of Independent States (TACIS) programme. Established in 1991, TACIS is a programme of technical assistance that supports the process of transition to market economies for the 11 CIS countries and Georgia.

For the 2007–2013 budgetary period the European Neighbourhood and Partnership Instrument (ENPI) covers the ENP countries, and replacing the TACIS funds for Ukraine.

By May 2014, the EU had disbursed 11 billion Euros in aid to Ukraine.

Ukraine is eligible for horizontal instruments, that cover countries regardless of their region, such as:

- the Instrument for Stability, a new instrument to tackle crises and instability in third countries and address trans-border challenges including nuclear safety and non-proliferation, the fight against trafficking, organised crime and terrorism;
- the Macro-Financial Assistance programme. In 2023, the European Investment Bank (EIB) established the EU for Ukraine Fund to address Ukraine's urgent needs. The fund focuses on renovating municipal facilities, enhancing public services, and providing financial and advisory support to small or large businesses. EU Member States have pledged approximately €400 million to this initiative.

This Fund is a €50 billion financial aid package from the European Union, and it is set to run from 2024 to 2027.

As of 2024, more than 300 hospitals, social housing facilities, schools, and kindergartens have been renovated in 150 cities.

Under the 3E4U programme, The EU and Germany fund initiatives aligning Ukrainian law with the "Fundamentals" cluster, offering grants of up to €85,000 per project for work on Chapters 23 and 24.

=== WTO membership of Ukraine (2009) ===
Since 2009, with the accession of Ukraine to the World Trade Organization, economic relations between the EU and Ukraine have to respect the WTO normative acquis. The EU has always believed that WTO membership can play a key role in supporting Ukraine's economic reform, especially in the context of a transition economy. In joining the WTO, Ukraine benefits from secure access to the markets of all WTO members and commits to providing the kind of stable trade and investment environment that will attract further trade and investment.

== Summits ==
=== EU-Ukraine Summits ===
- 1st EU-Ukraine Summit: 5 September 1997 in Kyiv
- 2nd EU-Ukraine Summit: 16 October 1998 in Vienna
- 3rd EU-Ukraine Summit: 23 July 1999 in Kyiv
- 4th EU-Ukraine Summit: 15 September 2000 in Paris
- 5th EU-Ukraine Summit: 11 September 2001 in Yalta
- 6th EU-Ukraine Summit: 4 July 2002 in Copenhagen
- 7th EU-Ukraine Summit: 7 October 2003 in Yalta
- 8th EU-Ukraine Summit: 8 July 2004 in the Hague
- 9th EU-Ukraine Summit: 1 December 2005 in Kyiv
- 10th EU-Ukraine Summit: 10 October 2006 in Helsinki
- 11th EU-Ukraine Summit: 14 September 2007 in Kyiv
- 12th EU-Ukraine Summit: September 2008 in Paris
- 13th EU-Ukraine Summit: 4 December 2009
- 14th EU-Ukraine Summit: 22 November 2010 in Brussels
- 15th EU-Ukraine Summit: 19 December 2011
- 16th EU-Ukraine Summit: 25 February 2013 in Brussels
- 17th EU-Ukraine Summit: 27 April 2015 in Kyiv
- 18th EU-Ukraine Summit: 24 November 2016 in Brussels
- 19th EU-Ukraine Summit: 12–13 July 2017 in Kyiv
- 20th EU-Ukraine Summit: 9 July 2018 in Brussels
- 21st EU-Ukraine Summit: 8 July 2019 in Kyiv
- 22nd EU-Ukraine Summit: 6 October 2020 in Brussels
- 23rd EU-Ukraine Summit: 12 October 2021 in Kyiv
- 24th EU-Ukraine Summit: 3 February 2023 in Kyiv

=== Other EU summits with notable Ukrainian participation ===
- Eastern Partnership Summit in Prague in May 2009
- Eastern Partnership Summit in Warsaw in September 2011
- Eastern Partnership Summit in Vilnius in November 2013
- Eastern Partnership Summit in Riga in May 2015
- Eastern Partnership Summit in Brussels on 24 November 2017
- 25th EU-Ukraine Business Summit: 10–11 April 2025, in Brussels (Autoworld), co-organized by the European Commission, the Government of Ukraine, the Polish Presidency of the EU Council, and Italy.

== Embassies ==
=== Representative of Ukraine to the European Union ===
1. Volodymyr Vasylenko (1992–1995)
2. Ihor Mityukov (1995–1997)
3. Borys Hudyma (1997–2000)
4. Roman Shpek (2000–2007)
5. Andrii Veselovsky (2008–2010)
6. Kostiantyn Yelisieiev (2010–2015)
7. Liubov Nepop (interim, 2015–2016)
8. Mykola Tochytskyi (2016–present)

=== Delegation to Ukraine ===
The Delegation of the European Union to Ukraine was opened in Kyiv in September 1993, having the status of a diplomatic mission and officially represents the EU in the Republic of Ukraine.

Delegations such as the one in Ukraine exist all over the world. Altogether there are over 136.

The Delegation's mandate includes:

- Promotion of the political and economic relations between the countries of accreditation and the European Union;
- Monitoring the implementation of the Partnership and Cooperation Agreements (PCA) between the EU and Ukraine;
- Informing the public of the development of the EU and to explain and defend individual EU policies;
- Participating in the implementation of the EU's external assistance programmes (mainly TACIS, FSP, ENP), focusing on the support of democratic development and good governance, regulatory reform and administrative capacity building, poverty reduction and economic growth.

== Popular support of Ukraine's integration with the European Union ==
In a November 2014 poll by Rating joining the EU was supported by all but two Oblasts of Ukraine (provinces); in Luhansk Oblast and Donetsk Oblast (an area known as Donbas) people preferred Ukraine's accession to the Eurasian Customs Union.

Traditionally Western Ukraine is found to be generally more enthusiastic about EU membership than Eastern Ukraine. In July 2012 and in May 2014 residents of West Ukraine (74% in July 2012 and 81% in May 2014), Central Ukraine (59% and 64%) and North Ukraine (56% and 71%) were the biggest supporters for EU membership. A June 2013 poll, on behalf of Deutsche Welle, found that 52% of Eastern Ukraine was in favor of joining the EU. But in a poll by ComRes (for CNN) in May 2014 only 19% of Eastern Ukraine considered Ukraine joining the European Union "Good". The Deutsche Welle poll was limited to respondents no older than 65 years in cities with more than 50,000 people. The May 2014 ComRes poll found out that in the three most eastern Oblasts of Ukraine (provinces), Kharkiv Oblast, Donetsk Oblast and Luhansk Oblast, 37% favored an alliance with Russia, 14% backed an alliance with the European Union and 49% stated Ukraine would be better off if it did not ally with either.

Citizens aged between 20 and 39 appeared to be the strongest supporters of joining the EU in May 2010 and December 2011 (in December 2011 the opinion of the age group 18–29 did not vary from one region to another). In the May 2014 ComRes poll people aged between 36 and 55 where the strongest supporters of joining the EU.

Ukraine's EU ambassador, Kostiantyn Yelisieiev, stated in July 2011 that business tycoons and politicians from Ukraine's Russian speaking east were as much pro-EU as the Ukrainian speaking west of the country: "If any politician today in Ukraine declared himself to be against European integration, he would be politically dead."

According to a poll conducted in February 2015 in all regions of Ukraine except Crimea, 66.4% would have voted in favor of joining the EU and 33.6% against with a turnout of 76.4%.

91% of Ukrainians support joining the European Union during the 2022 Russian invasion of Ukraine, according to a poll conducted by the Rating Sociological Group on 30–31 March 2022.

Support in Ukraine for European Union and Eurasian Customs Union or Eurasian Economic Union membership

2004–2013
| Date | Integration | | | Poll agency |
| Date | EU | EACU | neither | Poll agency |
|---|---|---|---|---|
| November 2004 | 56% | | | University of Sussex |
| January 2008 | 63% | – | | BBC News |
| November 2011 | 42% | 40% | | International Republican Institute |
| November 2011 | 45% | 34% | | Razumkov Centre |
| December 2011 | 40% | 33% | | Democratic Initiatives Foundation |
| July 2012 | 54% | | | Rating |
| August 2012 | 53% | 28% | | International Republican Institute |
| December 2012 | 48% | 32% | | Democratic Initiatives & Razumkov Centre |
| March 2013 | 50% | 37% | | Rating |
| June 2013 | 59% | 24% | | IFAK Ukraine |
| October 2013 | 53% | 34% | | Rating |
| November 2013 | 39% | 37% | | Kyiv International Institute of Sociology |
| November 2013 | 58% | 31% | 11% | Brookings Institution |
| December 2013 | 46% | 36% | | Research & Branding Group |
| December 2013 | 47% | 36% | | Democratic Initiatives Foundation |
| December 2013 | 43% | 30% | 20% | Research & Branding Group |

2014-2019
| Date | Integration | | | | Poll agency |
| Date | EU | EACU | neither | undecided | Poll agency |
|---|---|---|---|---|---|
| January 2014 | 38% | 29% | 25% | | Sociopolis |
| February 2014 | 41% | 36% | | | International Republican Institute |
| February 2014 | 47% | 38% | | | Социс |
| March 2014 | 62% | 38% | | | Социс |
| March 2014 | 50% | 27% | | | GfK |
| March 2014 | 53% | 28% | | | International Republican Institute |
| March 2014 | 59% | 31% | | | Rating |
| May 2014 | 54% | – | | | ComRes, CNN |
| June 2014 | 61% | 22% | | | Razumkov Centre |
| June 2014 | 62% | – | | | Gorshenin Institute |
| October 2014 | 63.6% | 13.6% | 14.6% | 8.1% | Gorshenin Institute |
| November 2014 | 64% | 17% | | | Rating |
| December 2014 | 73% | – | | | Deutsche Welle |
| February 2015 | 47% | 12% | 27% | | Kyiv International Institute of Sociology |
| March 2015 | 51.4% | 10.5% | 24.7% | 13.3% | Kyiv International Institute of Sociology |
| March 2015 | 52% | 12.6% | 22.6% | | Razumkov Centre |
| June 2015 | 67% | 12% | | | Pew Research Center |
| January 2016 | 59% | 16% | | | Rating |
| May 2016 | 46.2% | 11.6% | 32.1% | 10.1% | Kyiv International Institute of Sociology |
| September 2016 | 49% | 25% | | 15% | Kyiv International Institute of Sociology |
| April 2017 | 53% | 18% | | 15% | International Republican Institute & Rating |
| September 2017 | 52% | 14% | | 24% | International Republican Institute & Rating |
| September 2017 | 57% | 15% | | 15% | Kyiv International Institute of Sociology |
| March 2018 | 52% | 18% | | 14% | International Republican Institute & Rating |
| June 2018 | 52% | 18% | | 14% | Rating |
| September 2018 | 58% | 23% | | 9.8% | Razumkov Centre |
| December 2018 | 53% | 13% | | 20% | International Republican Institute & Rating |
| December 2019 | 64% | 13% | | | Razumkov Centre |

2020–2024
| Date | Support of EU membership | | | Poll agency |
| Date | For | Against | undecided | Poll agency |
|---|---|---|---|---|
| January 2020 | 64% | 23% | | Ilko Kucheriv Democratic Initiatives Foundation. |
| February 2020 | 52.1% | 19% | | Kyiv International Institute of Sociology |
| June 2021 | 51.6% | 26% | | Kyiv International Institute of Sociology |
| August 2021 | 64% | 27% | | Rating |
| December 2021 | 67.1% | 21.6% | 9.4% | Kyiv International Institute of Sociology |
| April 2022 | 91% | 4% | | Rating |
| June 2022 | 87% | 4% | | Rating |
| July 2022 | 81% | 4% | | Kyiv International Institute of Sociology |
| October 2022 | 86% | 3% | | Rating |
| January 2023 | 87% | 3% | | Rating |
| January 2023 | 92% | | | National Democratic Institute |
| July 2023 | 85% | 4% | 2% | Rating |
| September 2023 | 81% | | | International Republican Institute |
| November 2023 | 78% | 5% | 14% | Rating |
| January 2024 | 84.3% | 7.4% | 8.3% | Razumkov Centre |
| September 2025 | 81.7% | 9% | 9.3% | Razumkov Centre |

== Accession of Ukraine to the European Union ==
=== 2002–2005 ===
On 12 January 2002, the European Parliament noted that Ukraine may enter the EU in the future. In 2002, EU Enlargement Commissioner Guenther Verheugen said that "the European perspective for Ukraine does not necessarily mean membership in the next 10-20 years, although it is possible". To join the European Union, the applicant state must meet the political and economic conditions commonly known as the Copenhagen Criteria (adopted at the Copenhagen Summit in 1993), namely a democratic government that recognizes the rule of law and relevant freedoms and institutions. According to the Maastricht Treaty, each current Member State, as well as the European Parliament, must agree on any enlargement.

In 2003, Finnish Institute of International Affairs (FIIA) published report under the title «Ukraine in Tomorrow's Europe» by Arkady Moshes. In paper described possible ways to help Ukraine be integrated in EU and vice versa, and how to decrease Russia's influence in Ukraine.

Obtaining the status of a full member of the EU as a strategic goal of Ukraine was first declared by President of Ukraine Viktor Yushchenko immediately after his election in early 2005. On 13 January 2005, the European Parliament almost unanimously (467 in favor, 19 against) adopted a resolution on the European Parliament's intentions to converge with Ukraine on membership. The European Commission notes that, although a certain preparatory period has yet to pass, the admission of new members is not ruled out. To which President Yushchenko responded with his intention to apply for membership "in the near future".

Several influential EU leaders at the time expressed support for improving ties with Ukraine. In particular, Polish Foreign Minister Adam Rotfeld stated on 21 March 2005 that Poland would support Ukraine's European integration aspirations under any circumstances. In particular, he said: "At this stage, we should focus on concrete steps of cooperation instead of empty talks about pan-European cooperation." Three days later, a survey in the six largest EU countries showed the commitment of EU citizens to accept Ukraine as a full member in the future.

In October 2005, European Commission President Jose Manuel Barroso said that "Ukraine's future is in the EU". However, on 9 October 2005, the European Commission, in a new version of the Development Strategy Paper, stated that the implementation of enlargement plans (Croatia and the former Yugoslav Republics) could block the accession of Ukraine, Belarus and Moldova. Enlargement Commissioner Olli Rehn said the EU should avoid "too much enlargement", stressing that the current enlargement plan looks complete.

Although Ukrainian officials and political scientists mentioned several specific dates for possible membership, only Ukraine's European Neighborhood Policy has been officially proposed to Ukraine by the EU so far. The presidential administration has been critical of the proposed status of neighborhood relations.

=== 2007–2014 ===
In March 2007, Ukraine was offered a Free Trade Agreement with the EU. Although this proposal provoked a much stronger reaction from the Ukrainian state, it did not contain specific plans for Ukraine's accession to the EU in the near future. Some Western European politicians have spoken of the temporary "fatigue of enlargement" of European institutions. Ukrainian observers identify the so-called "resistance group" of Ukraine's accession to the EU. In particular, when concluding the text of the Enhanced Agreement between Ukraine and the EU in March 2007, references to the prospect of membership were excluded from it. "Any mention of the prospect of Ukraine's accession to the European Union has been excluded from the draft enhanced Ukraine-EU agreement due to France's position", wrote the influential German newspaper Frankfurter Allgemeine Zeitung. Italy's position depends on the domestic political situation of this country. Thus, during the election campaign in this country, the government of Silvio Berlusconi gave diplomatic signals that he was ready to support Ukraine's European integration aspirations. His political opponent Romano Prodi, on the other hand, said that "Ukraine's prospects for joining the EU are the same as in New Zealand".

According to the Eastern Partnership policy, Ukraine can become a member of the European Union. On 27 February 2014 the European Parliament passed a resolution that recognized Ukraine's right to "apply to become a Member of the Union, provided that it adheres to the principles of democracy, respects fundamental freedoms and human and minority rights, and ensures the rule of law". The European Parliament notes that in accordance with Article 49 of the Treaty with the EU, Georgia, Moldova and Ukraine, like any other European country, have a European perspective and can apply for EU membership in accordance with the principles of democracy, - said in a resolution of the European Parliament in Brussels, adopted at the last session before the elections to the European Parliament, which took place on 23–25 May 2014. 27 June 2014 The President of the European Commission Jose Manuel Barroso stated that the Association Agreement is the beginning of Ukraine's accession to the EU. On the same day, EU Enlargement Commissioner Stefan Fuele stated that he believed in Ukraine's future membership in the EU.

=== 2014–2022 ===
In March 2016, President of the European Commission Jean-Claude Juncker stated that it would take at least 20–25 years for Ukraine to join the EU and NATO. In June 2018, President of Ukraine Petro Poroshenko said he expects Ukraine will join the European Union and the North Atlantic Treaty Organisation by 2030.

At the X session of the Ukraine-Poland-Lithuania Interparliamentary Assembly, which ended on 8 June 2019 in Kyiv, the parties signed a final document containing an agreement on the strategy of 2025 and 2027 as a period for Ukraine's possible accession to the EU. In 2027, when Lithuania will hold the EU presidency for the second time, the issue of Ukraine will be the main issue on the agenda. If this opportunity is not used, the next "window" will open in 2039, when Poland will preside over the EU and Lithuania will preside only in 2041.

On 23 July 2020, Poland, Lithuania and Ukraine created a tripartite platform for political, economic, cultural and social cooperation—the Lublin Triangle, which aims to support Ukraine's integration into the EU and NATO.

In February 2021, the leader of the presiding Christian Democratic Union of Germany, Armin Laschet, who was considered a likely successor to Angela Merkel as Chancellor of Germany, supported the idea of EU enlargement and giving Ukraine a European perspective:

The question of Ukraine's accession to the EU does not arise at the moment, but it will inevitably arise in the future. We must support Ukraine on its difficult path and at the same time open a European perspective.

Quite a few experts believe that in times of deteriorating relations between Russia and the EU, Ukraine has a window of opportunity to join the European Union. Pavlo Klimkin noted that Ukraine still does not meet any criteria for joining the European Union, as it does not have an established democracy, rule of law and a full-fledged market economy. According to him, the first chance was lost in early 2005, when Yushchenko was persuaded not to apply, and in 2014 it was much more difficult to do so.

On 11 February 2021, the European Parliament published a report on Ukraine's success in implementing the Association Agreement with the European Union. The document highlights both the main successes of Ukraine on this path, as well as failures or moments that hinder the reform process in the country. In general, the European Union is not yet ready to officially talk about the prospects of Ukraine's accession to the ranks of member states, but Ukraine's European perspective is recognized. In 2021, Ukraine was preparing to formally apply for EU membership in 2024, in order to join the European Union in the 2030s.

=== 2022–present ===
Countries that could join the European Union Current members Candidate countries Applicant / potential candidate countries Membership possible Membership not possible

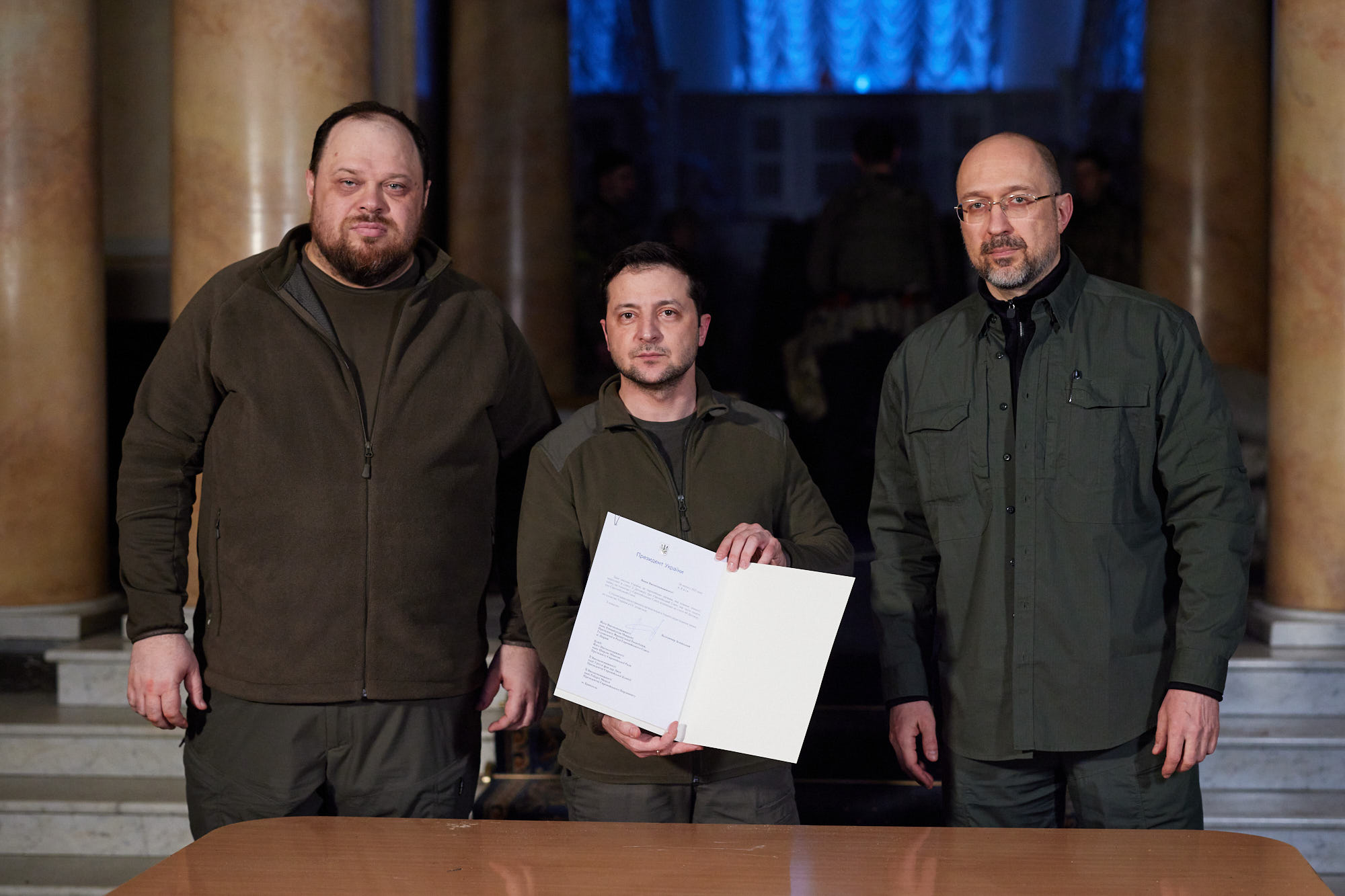
Ukrainian president Volodymyr Zelenskyy accompanied by Ruslan Stefanchuk and Denys Shmyhal, showing the application for EU membership candidacy on 28 February 2022

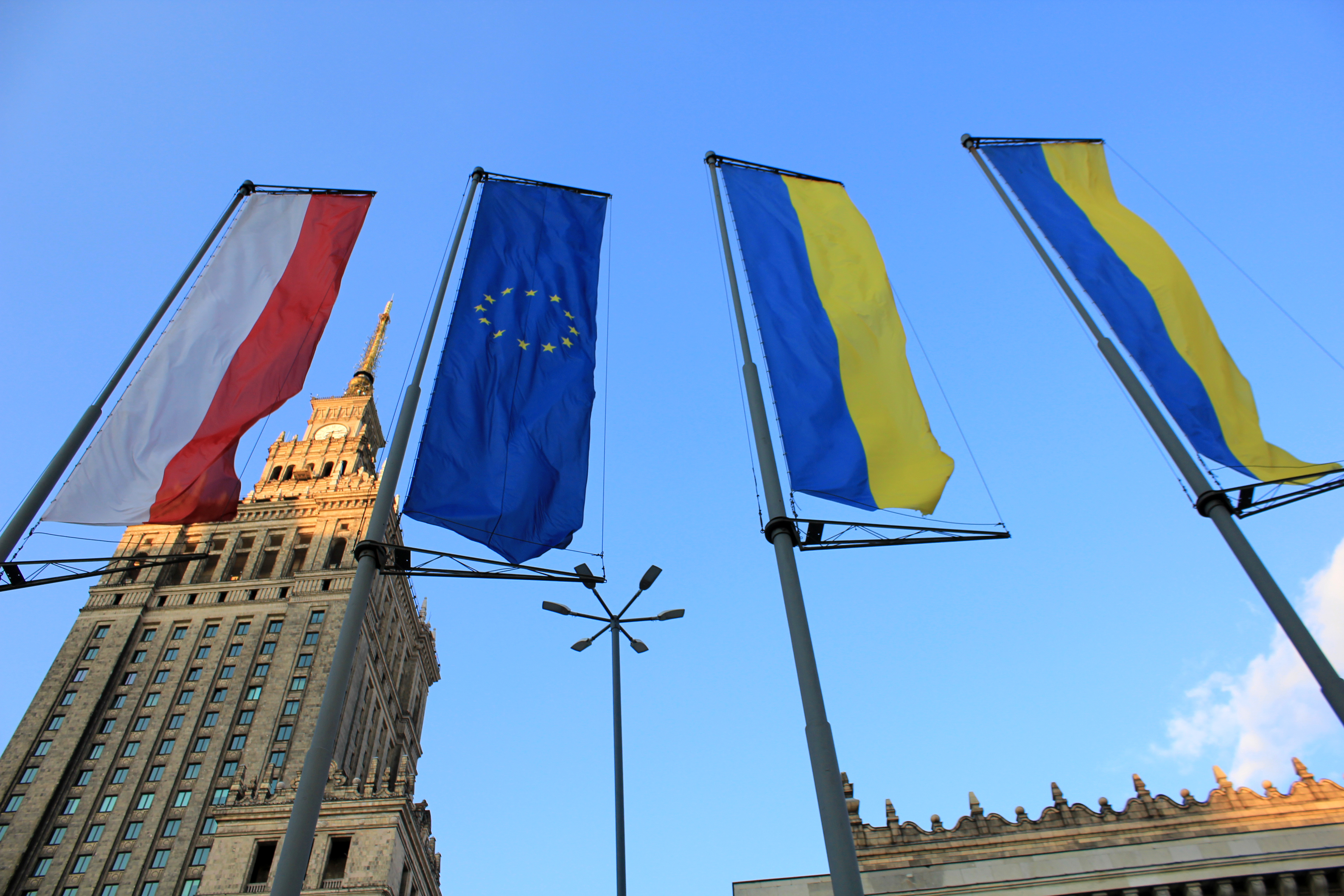
Two Ukrainian flags next to the flag of Poland and the European Union in central Warsaw, May 2022. Fot. Ivonna Nowicka.

Following the 2022 Russian invasion of Ukraine, there were additional calls to start a formal accession process. Ukraine reiterated its desire to become a member of the union, and President of the European Commission Ursula von der Leyen stated that Ukraine belongs in the European Union. Slovak prime minister Eduard Heger expressed support for an accelerated accession process.

On 28 February, Ukraine officially submitted a letter of application for membership. Due to the ongoing crisis, President Volodymyr Zelenskyy requested immediate admission to the European Union under a special procedure. Eight EU member states (Bulgaria, the Czech Republic, Estonia, Latvia, Lithuania, Poland, Slovakia and Slovenia) signed a letter supporting an accelerated accession process for Ukraine. On 1 March, Hungarian foreign minister Péter Szijjártó stated his country would also support an accelerated process.

On 1 March 2022, the European Parliament, following a debate in which the President of Ukraine addressed and received applause, recommended that Ukraine be made an official "candidate" for EU membership. The European Parliament has voted to advance Ukraine's membership with 637 voted for, with 13 voted against, and 26 abstained. On 2 March, however, Spanish foreign minister José Manuel Albares stated that "belonging to the EU is not a capricious process or one that can be done by a mere political decision", reminding that the candidate country "must meet certain social, political and economic standards".

On 7 March, the EU said it will formally assess Ukraine's application. On 8 April, European Commission president Ursula von der Leyen and EU foreign policy chief Josep Borrell visited Kyiv. Von der Leyen presented president Zelenskyy with a questionnaire for membership. Borrell announced that the EU delegation to Ukraine, headed by Matti Maasikas, will return to Kyiv after it was evacuated at the outbreak of war. On 18 April, Ukraine completed the questionnaire. On 24 May, the Council of the European Union adopted a regulation enabling for temporary trade liberalisation with Ukraine, interrupting all tariffs under Title IV of the association agreement, anti-dumping duties and the enforcement of common rules for imports.

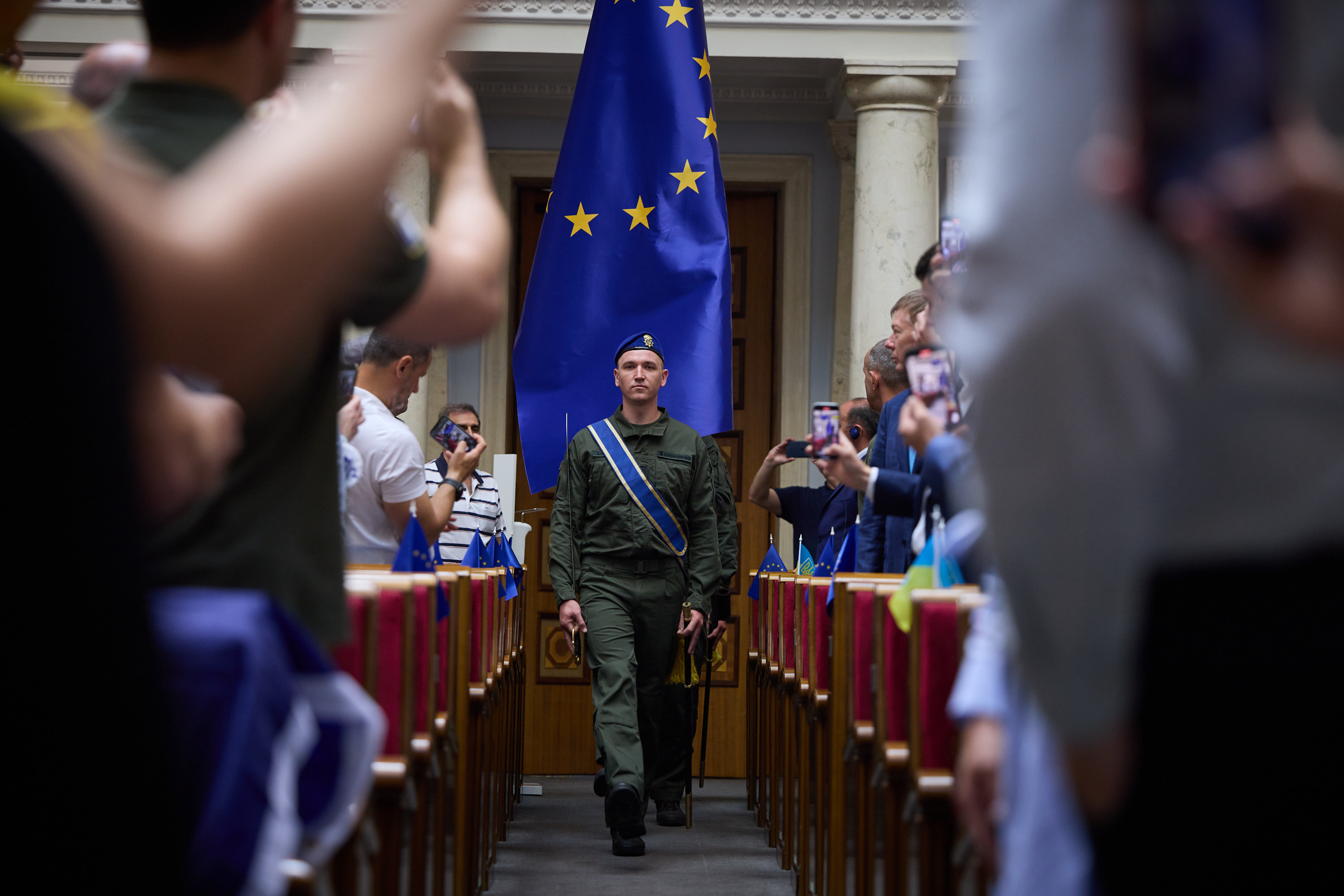
On 1 July 2022, the EU flag was solemnly brought into the hall of the Verkhovna Rada of Ukraine, where it will fly from that time on.

On 17 June 2022, the EU Commission officially announced its recommendation to grant Ukraine EU candidate status. On 23 June 2022, the European Parliament adopted a resolution calling for the immediate granting of candidate status for membership in the European Union to Ukraine. On 23 June 2022, the European Council granted Ukraine the status of a candidate for accession to the European Union. In January 2023, the prime minister of Ukraine claimed that the country would join the EU "within the next two years", however, this is seen as overly optimistic within the bloc.

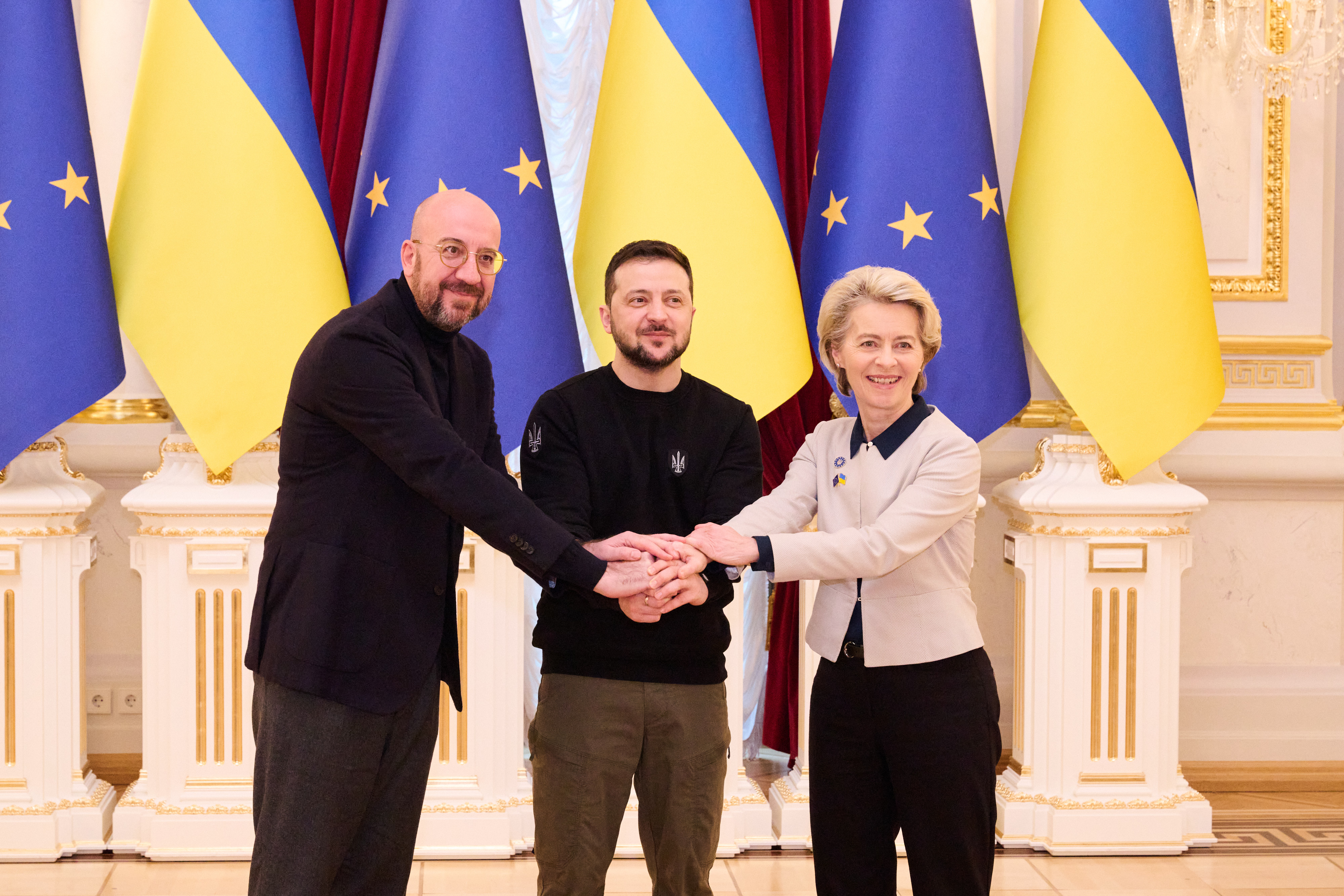
Ukrainian President Volodymyr Zelenskyy with President of the European Council Charles Michel and President of the European Commission Ursula von der Leyen at the 2023 EU–Ukraine Summit in Kyiv, 3 February 2023

On 8 May 2023, the President of Ukraine established a decree to celebrate Europe Day on 9 May, coinciding with EU member states. Representative of the European Commission Dana Spinant welcomed Ukraine's decision to start celebrating Europe Day on 9 May, noting that this decision is a reflection of the European identity of the Ukrainian people.

In October 2023, former European Commission President Jean Claude Juncker called Ukraine "massively corrupt" at all levels of society. Juncker, a most experienced expert of EU-Ukraine relations said in an article by the Augsburger Allgemeine that the admission of Ukraine to the EU "would be neither good for the EU nor for Ukraine". Juncker's statements stand in sharp contrast to the acting EU Commission President Ursula von der Leyen's drive to allow the opening of accession negotiations for Ukraine to join the EU as soon as December 2023. Membership of Ukraine in the EU is seen as a major factor to win the war against Russia as the country relies on military and economic support from other European nations.

On 8 November 2023, the European Commission recommended starting accession talks with Ukraine and Moldova. On 14 December 2023, the European Council agreed to open accession negotiations with Ukraine, as well as Moldova. Hungary long opposed talks starting accession negotiations, did not veto the move. Prime Minister Viktor Orban left the room momentarily in what officials described as a pre-agreed and constructive manner, while the other 26 leaders went ahead with the vote.

On 21 June 2024, the European Union agreed to start membership negotiations with Ukraine. Accession negotiations began on 25 June 2024, at the same time as those with Moldova. On 2 September 2025, Russian President Vladimir Putin announced that Russia did not oppose Ukraine's membership in the EU, but opposed its membership in NATO.

On 24 July 2024, despite the Donald Tusk government's positive stance towards Ukraine, Poland's deputy prime minister Władysław Kosiniak-Kamysz declared that Ukraine would not join the European Union "if the Volhynia issue is not resolved".

On 23 April 2026, the EU approved a €90 billion loan for Ukraine. On 24 April 2026, German Chancellor Friedrich Merz stated that Ukraine cannot join the EU while at war, contrary to President Zelenskyy's goal of EU membership by 2027.

Following Orban's defeat in the 2026 Hungarian parliamentary election, succeeding Hungarian prime minister Péter Magyar indicated an end to his country's veto of opening accession negotiations as well as EU defense assistance. However, Magyar remained opposed to fast-tracking Ukraine's accession, actively blocking it by claiming to have removed related clauses from a European Council summit declaration in June 2026.

== Ukraine's foreign relations with EU member states ==
- Austria
- Belgium
- Bulgaria
- Croatia
- Cyprus
- Czech Republic
- Denmark
- Estonia
- Finland
- France
- Germany
- Greece
- Hungary
- (Republic of Ireland) Ireland
- Italy
- Latvia
- Lithuania
- Luxembourg
- Malta
- Netherlands
- Poland
- Portugal
- Romania
- Slovakia
- Slovenia
- Spain
- Sweden

== See also ==
- Accession of Armenia to the European Union
- Accession of Georgia to the European Union
- Accession of Moldova to the European Union
- Accession of Ukraine to the European Union
- Armenia–European Union relations
- Azerbaijan–European Union relations
- Association Trio
- Eastern Partnership
- European Political Community
- Euronest Parliamentary Assembly
- Georgia–European Union relations
- Moldova–European Union relations
- INOGATE
- Poland–Ukraine relations
- Russia–European Union relations
- Ukraine–NATO relations
- 2022 Russian invasion of Ukraine
- Borders with EU members
  - Hungary–Ukraine border
  - Poland–Ukraine border
  - Romania–Ukraine border
  - Slovakia–Ukraine border

== Literature ==
- Anatolij Ponomarenko: "Die europäische Orientierung der Ukraine: Dekret des Präsidenten der Ukraine über die Strategie der Integration der Ukraine in die Europäische Union; Partnerschaftsabkommen zwischen der EU und der Ukraine". Zentrum für Europäische Integrationsforschung, Bonn 1999. 42 S. ISBN 3-933307-39-2 (in German)
- Dezseri, Kalman [ed.]: Economic and political relations after the EU enlargement: the Visegrad countries and Russia, Ukraine, Belarus and Moldova, Budapest 2004.
- Wolfgang Tiede and Sabina Krispenz: "Die Ukraine auf dem Weg in die Europäische Union?" ("Ukraine on the way to the European Union?" in Osteuropa-Recht (OER)) 2008 (German Law Journal), vol. 6, pp. 417–426.
- Wolfgang Tiede and Christina Schröder: Die Ukraine auf dem Weg in die NATO? ("Ukraine on the Way to NATO Membership?"), in Osteuropa-Recht (OER) 2009 (German Law Journal), vol. 3, pp. 294–304 (in German).
- Andreas Umland: "Europa und die ukrainische Misere: Weil die EU dem Land eine Mitgliedschaft gar nicht in Aussicht stellt, trägt sie zum Chaos in Kiew bei. Ein historischer Fehler", in: Frankfurter Allgemeine Sonntagszeitung, 1 November 2009, p. 15 (in German).
- Wolfgang Tiede and Jakob Schirmer: "Strategische Notwendigkeit – Die Östliche Partnerschaft der Europäischen Union" ("The EU's Eastern Partnership"), in "WeltTrends" (Zeitschrift für internationale Politik und vergleichende Studien), 71/2010, pp. 10–14 (in German).
- Dmitry Yefremenko. Life after Vilnius. A new geopolitical configuration for Ukraine. - Russia in Global Affairs. - Vol. 11, No. 3 - July – September 2013. Electronic version: Life after Vilnius Archived 2 February 2014 at the Wayback Machine
