= Portugal–Ukraine relations =

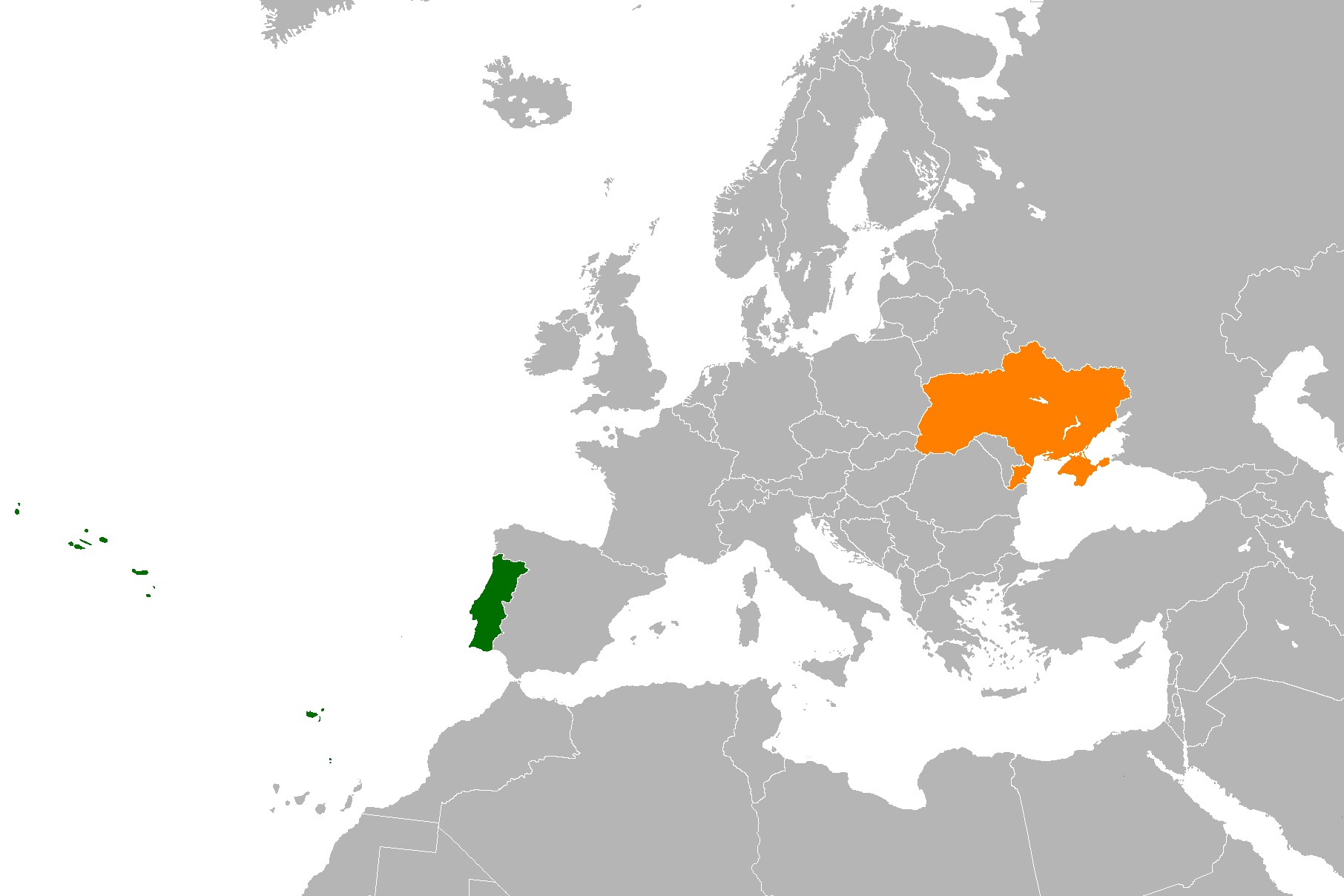
- Portugal: Ukraine

Portugal–Ukraine relations are foreign relations between Portugal and Ukraine. Portugal recognized Ukraine's independence in 1991. Diplomatic relations between both countries were established in 1992. Portugal has an embassy in Kyiv. Ukraine has an embassy and an honorary consulate in Lisbon and a consulate in Porto. Portugal is a member of NATO and the European Union, which Ukraine applied for in 2022. Both countries are full members of the Organization for Security and Co-operation in Europe and of the Council of Europe.

== History ==
In the 5th century, the Sarmatian Alans came from the Ukrainian steppes to the Portuguese lands. In alliance with the Germanic Svevi tribe, they founded the Svevi Kingdom in Galicia and Northern Portugal, as well as the Alan State in Central and Southern Portugal.

At the end of the 6th century, the Portuguese Suevi and Alans were conquered by the Visigoths. It was one of the branches of the Gothic people who, after losing their own state in Ukraine, migrated to the Mediterranean, where they founded the Italian and Spanish kingdoms.

At the beginning of the 8th century, the Portuguese territories were conquered by Muslims. Part of the army of the conquerors consisted of slaves, the so-called Sakaliba (Slavs), recruited from Eastern Europe. In the 11th century, after the collapse of the Córdoba caliphate, some slave soldiers became the leaders of the taifas in the lands of Portugal.

The Portuguese state emerged during the Reconquista. Its founder was Henry of Burgundy (1066–1112), the first Portuguese count. According to a Portuguese medieval legend, he was considered the son of the Hungarian king Andras I, the husband of Princess Anastasia of Kyiv.

During the Thirty Years' War (1618–1648), Ukrainian Cossacks took part on the side of the Catholic Spanish-Portuguese alliance against the Protestant coalition supported by the Ottomans and Muscovy.

== Sporting agreements ==
On 5 October 2022 the Portuguese Football Federation (FPF) and Royal Spanish Football Federation (RFEF) announced the addition of Ukraine to the Spain-Portugal joint bid for FIFA World Cup 2030.

== Resident diplomatic missions ==
- Portugal has an embassy in Kyiv.
- Ukraine has an embassy in Lisbon.
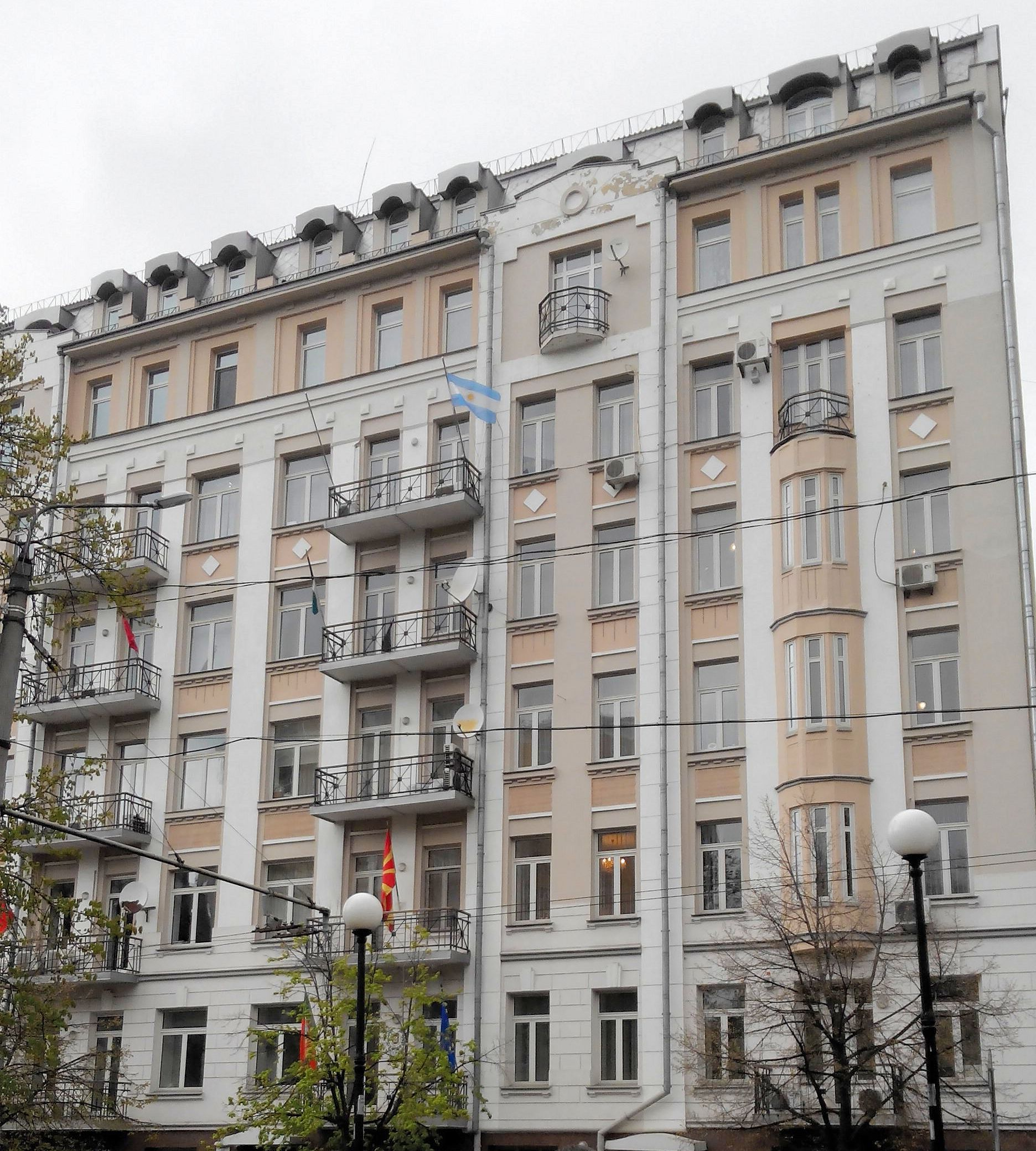
Embassy of Portugal in Kyiv

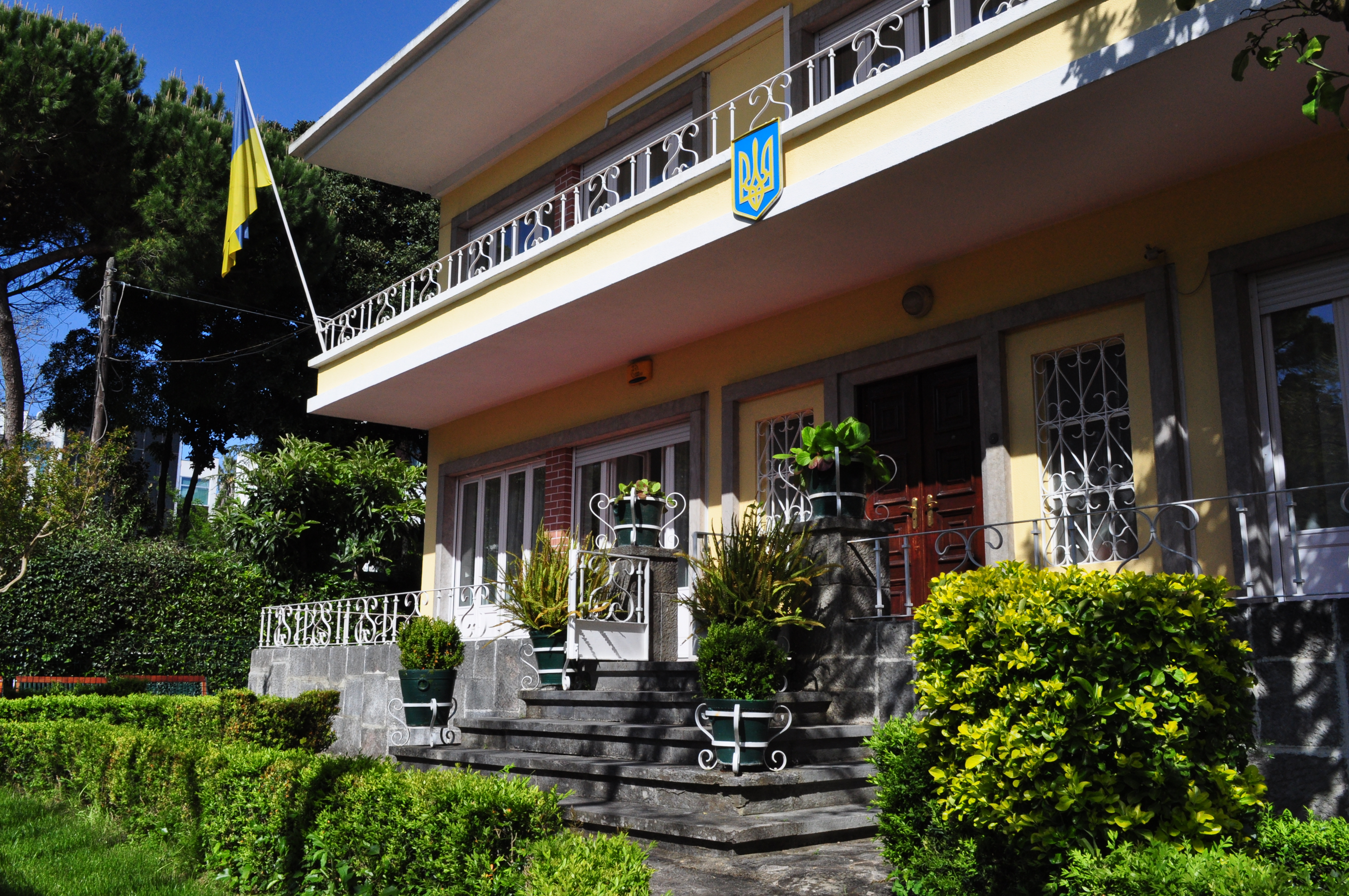
Embassy of Ukraine in Lisbon

== See also ==
- Foreign relations of Portugal
- Foreign relations of Ukraine
- Ukraine-NATO relations
- Ukraine-EU relations
  - Accession of Ukraine to the EU
- Ukrainians in Portugal
