= 2008 EU–Ukraine Summit =

The Paris summit of September 2008 was a major event in the EU-Ukraine bilateral relations. It was hosted by Nicolas Sarkozy, President of France and president-in-office of the European Council. Also, Javier Solana, the High Representative of the EU for common foreign and security policy and some other high-ranking officials from Brussels attended the event.

According to Ukraine's president, Viktor Yuschenko, "the message he received from the EU was full of hope and promise". However, most observers noticed the lack of unity among Member States as far as Ukraine's future is concerned. In fact, the EU has pledged to tighten economic and political ties with Ukraine, while refusing to put the country on a path to join the bloc

The only thing which was viewed as a substantial progress was the name of the new enhanced agreement replacing the PCA: an Association Agreement between the EU and Ukraine. However, the presidency-in-office emphasized that the issue of recognizing European aspiration of Ukraine was not on the agenda.

Also, Ukraine and the EU agreed on starting talks leading to complete lifting of visa requirements for Ukrainians. As far as economic and trade cooperation is concerned, leaders only expressed hope that the ongoing negotiation process on establishing a free-trade area between the EU and Ukraine could be finalised by the end of 2009.

However, the biggest disappointment for Ukraine was that Germany, Italy, Belgium, the Netherlands and Luxembourg opposed any explicit wording of a European perspective of Ukraine. Once again, the European Commission formula for Ukraine - "the future cannot be prejudged" - was used to resist pro-European demands of the Ukrainian leadership to recognize the country's right to join the bloc in the future. As a result, the EU official position dating back to 2004 did not change, despite numerous arguments in favor of supporting Ukraine from Poland, the Baltic States, the UK, the Czech Republic and other Member States.

Some observers underline that the so-called "Old Europe" club insisted that it was not the right time to offer such a gift to Ukraine. They were chiefly Germany and Italy where respectively F.W. Steinmeyer and Silvio Berlusconi are viewed as strong lobbyists of Russian interests in the shared neighbourhood.

The official communiqué of the summit does however state that "Ukraine's future is in Europe". The new "Association agreement" would be composed of four parts, each covering a different area. These are political dialogue and foreign and international security policy; justice and internal security issues; economic and social cooperation; and the establishment of a comprehensive free-trade area.

The diplomatic efforts of the EU aiming to pacify victorious Russia had a direct impact on the EU-Ukraine summit, prompting a last-minute change in the location of the meeting from Evian to Paris to allow to the EU leaders more time to rest after their return from Moscow and Tbilisi.

== Documents adopted ==
=== Declaration on the Association agreement ===
In a 10 paragraph text, the EU acknowledges:

1. Ukraine's progress in implementing democratic reforms as evidenced in the parliamentary elections of September 2007 was successful.
2. Ukraine's progress in economic reforms, rewarded by its accession to the World Trade Organization in early 2008.
3. the substantial progress in negotiating the new enhanced agreement since its beginning in March 2007 under the German Presidency of the Council of the EU.
4. that Ukraine, as a European country, shares a common history and common values, with the countries of the European Union.
5. that the new enhanced agreement should be an Association agreement which leaves open the way for further progressive developments in EU-Ukraine relations.
6. Ukraine's European aspirations and welcomes its European choice.
7. that gradual convergence of Ukraine with the EU in political, economic and legal areas will contribute to further progress in bilateral relations.
8. that the Association agreement will renew the common institutional framework, facilitate the deepening of relations in all areas, strengthen political association and economic integration between the EU and Ukraine by means of reciprocal rights and obligations.
9. that the Association agreement will provide a solid basis for further convergence between the EU and Ukraine on foreign policy and security issues, including promoting respect for the principles of independence, sovereignty, territorial integrity and inviolability of borders.
10. that the establishment of a deep and comprehensive free trade area with large-scale regulatory approximation of Ukraine to EU standards, will contribute to the gradual integration of Ukraine into the EU internal market.
11. that the current EU-Ukraine Action Plan is to be replaced by a new practical instrument by March 2009 with a view to preparing the implementation of the Association agreement.
12. that a visa dialogue with the long-time perspective of establishing a visa free regime should be launched; relevant conditions should be developed.

=== Declaration on cooperation ===
The document's title is "deepening EU-Ukraine cooperation" In the first chapter, the necessity to replace the Action plan by a new mechanism is underlined.

In the second chapter - Foreign and Security Policy - it was agreed on a further convergence in positions in regional and international issues within the existing framework of political consultations, Ukraine's alignments with the EU statements and positions, as well as Ukraine's participation in the EU's efforts on crisis management.

The EU welcomed the establishment and encouraged further development of regular dialogue between military bodies, namely the EU Military Committee and the General Headquarters of the Armed Forces of Ukraine. Also, it was stated that Ukraine and the European Defense Agency will establish close contacts to discuss military capability issues.

The third chapter - Cooperation in Energy sphere - underlines that the energy security needs of the EU and Ukraine are intrinsically linked. It says that the EU welcomed the imminent start of negotiations regarding the accession of Ukraine to the Energy Community treaty and the preparatory studies concerning the synchronous interconnection of the Ukrainian electricity networks with that of the Union for the Coordination of the Transmission of Energy.

In the fourth chapter - Justice, Liberty and Security - the implementation of agreements on facilitation on the issuance of visas and readmission was discussed. Also, the issues of local border traffic, joint border controls at the border crossing points on common borders were mentioned. Then, as far as visa free travel is concerned, the document points that the dialogue on the level of experts is expected to be launched before the end of 2008. The negotiation should be focused on some specific issues: document security, illegal migration, readmission, public order and security, external relations.

The fifth chapter - the Environment - shows that Ukraine has reconfirmed its commitments under Espoo, Aarus and other relevant multilateral environmental agreements.

The sixth chapter - Trade, Economy and Transport - covers Ukraine's future accession to the Charter for small enterprises. In the field of civil aviation, it welcomes the launch of Common Aviation Area negotiations which are expected to be concluded by the end of 2008. In this context adopting of a new Ukraine's Air Code is said to be compulsory. Also some other issues related to land transport infrastructure were mentioned.

In further two chapters - EURO2012 and Transnistria - the EU and Ukraine made some general statements, in particular concerning Border Assistance Mission at the Ukrainian-Moldovan border. The EU expressed the will to come back to the 5+2 format of negotiation on the Transnistria.

=== Declaration on Georgia ===
In a special declaration on Georgia, the EU and Ukraine expressed their concern over the armed conflict between Russia and Georgia. The text is a partial copy of the 1 September 2008 European Council extraordinary meeting. The EU and Ukraine confirmed the right of every nation to choose freely its foreign policy orientations and joining alliances. Besides backing the Six-points ceasefire and troop withdrawal plan, the EU and Ukraine called for a reinforced cooperation in the region and stressed that the conflict settlement should be achieved with the respect of territorial integrity of Georgia.

=== Paris summit facts and wording ===
On the visa free talks between the EU and Ukraine:

There won't be any road map for Ukraine [in this matter]. Such terms as "road map" apply to some other [partner] countries. We'd rather call it "conditions"... We succeeded in inserting [into the text] the word "conditions" [for a visa free travel]. A. Veselovsky, Ukrainian ambassador to the EU in an interview to UNIAN. [Balkan States are on a path of a visa free travel and they all got from the EU a set of specific conditions called a road map]

On the nature of the Association agreement: The Association agreement between the EU and Ukraine "neither closes any roads, nor opens them". (N. Sarkozy)

On the community of values and common history: "We have a common history and we share common values" (N. Sarkozy)

On the exceptional relationship: "We will build up our Eastern partnership in the region where Ukraine will be granted an exceptional relationship" (N. Sarkozy)

On the personal role of the president-in-office: "I speak in the name of the EU, in the name of unity. I was not allowed by the Union to make any other declarations" (N. Sarkozy on the "European perspective" issue)

On the cooperation on the preparations for 2012 European football championship: According to the final communiqué of the summit, Ukraine and the EU agreed to cooperate "within the framework of existing cooperation mechanisms" on the issue of EURO 2012. (UNIAN, EU news, 1.09.2008)

On the necessity of setting up of common border checkpoints: "The leaders call Ukraine and neighbouring Member States to consider the possibility of establishing of a common border control and setting up of common border checkpoints. This could improve and facilitate transborder traffic and commerce, respecting security standards and environmental legislation". (UNIAN, EU news, 1 September 2008)

On the Transnistria issue: "The sides voiced their mutual interest in resuming of talks in the format 5+2 in order to accelerate the conflict resolution" (UNIAN, EU news, 1 September 2008)

== Post summit developments ==
On 15 September, the Ukrainian government announced that the negotiations on various chapter of the Association agreement are continuing with political chapter being provisionally closed and the fourth round on free trade being scheduled for October 2008 . However, according to Deputy Prime Minister Hryhoriy Nemyria, due to slow dynamics, the chapter of free trade is expected to be concluded by the end of 2009. The Ukrainian side expressed that it would not agree to sign the document before the free trade settlement.

Earlier, in an interview to the BBC, Hryhoriy Nemyria stressed that some political forces in Ukraine wanted to use recent events in the Caucasus to achieve their unspecified goals. He reiterated the official stand of Ukraine's government on Georgia which is based on full respect of this country's national sovereignty within its internationally recognized borders. The Deputy Prime Minister drew attention to the fact that Ukraine had been among the first countries to provide for humanitarian and financial aid at the very beginning of the August 2008 crisis.

== See also ==
- 2023 EU–Ukraine Summit
