= Plan on Priority Measures for European Integration of Ukraine =

The Plan on Priority Measures for European Integration of Ukraine was an action plan issued by the Decision of the National Security and Defense Council of Ukraine on March 12, 2013 for integration of Ukraine with the European Union (EU), adopted by the Decree of the Cabinet of Ministers of Ukraine (of the second Azarov Government) (No. 73-р) on February 13, 2013, and entered into force by the Decree of President Viktor Yanukovych (No. 127/2013).

The plan was aimed to facilitate the process of preparation of Ukraine signing their Association Agreement with the EU, which was planned for 28 November 2013. On 21 November 2013, the Ukrainian government suspended preparations for signing an Association Agreement and Deep and Comprehensive Free Trade Agreement with the European Union, which led to the start of the Euromaidan protests in November 2013. Ukrainian Prime Minister Mykola Azarov stated that the issue that blocked the signature of the EU deal was conditions proposed for an International Monetary Fund loan being negotiated at the same time, which would require large budget cuts and a 40% increase in gas bills. On 7 December 2013, the IMF clarified that it was not insisting on a single-stage increase in natural gas tariffs in Ukraine by 40%, but recommended that they be gradually raised to an economically justified level while compensating the poorest segments of the population for the losses from such an increase by strengthening targeted social assistance. The same day, IMF Resident Representative in Ukraine Jerome Vacher stated that this particular IMF loan was worth 4 billion US Dollars and that it would be linked with "policy, which would remove disproportions and stimulated growth".

== Structure ==
The plan includes measures for implementing conditions set by the EU for signing the agreement:

- Preparation of Ukraine for the future implementation of the Association Agreement;
- Cooperation between Ukraine and the EU in the areas of justice, freedom and security;
- Reform of Ukrainian judicial system, law enforcement agencies, election system, fight on corruption;
- Trade, economic, and sectorial cooperation;
- Improvement of the business climate in the country.

== Aftermath ==
On 21 November 2013, a second Azarov Government decree suspended preparations for signing of Ukraine's Association Agreement with the EU. (Opposition to) this (21 November 2013) decree started the Euromaidan protest movement in November 2013 that eventually led to the 2014 Ukrainian revolution with the ousting as President Yanukovych and the dismissal of the second Azarov Government and the exile in Russia of Yanukovych, Prime Minister Azarov and several other second Azarov Government ministers.
