= Ukrainians in Portugal =

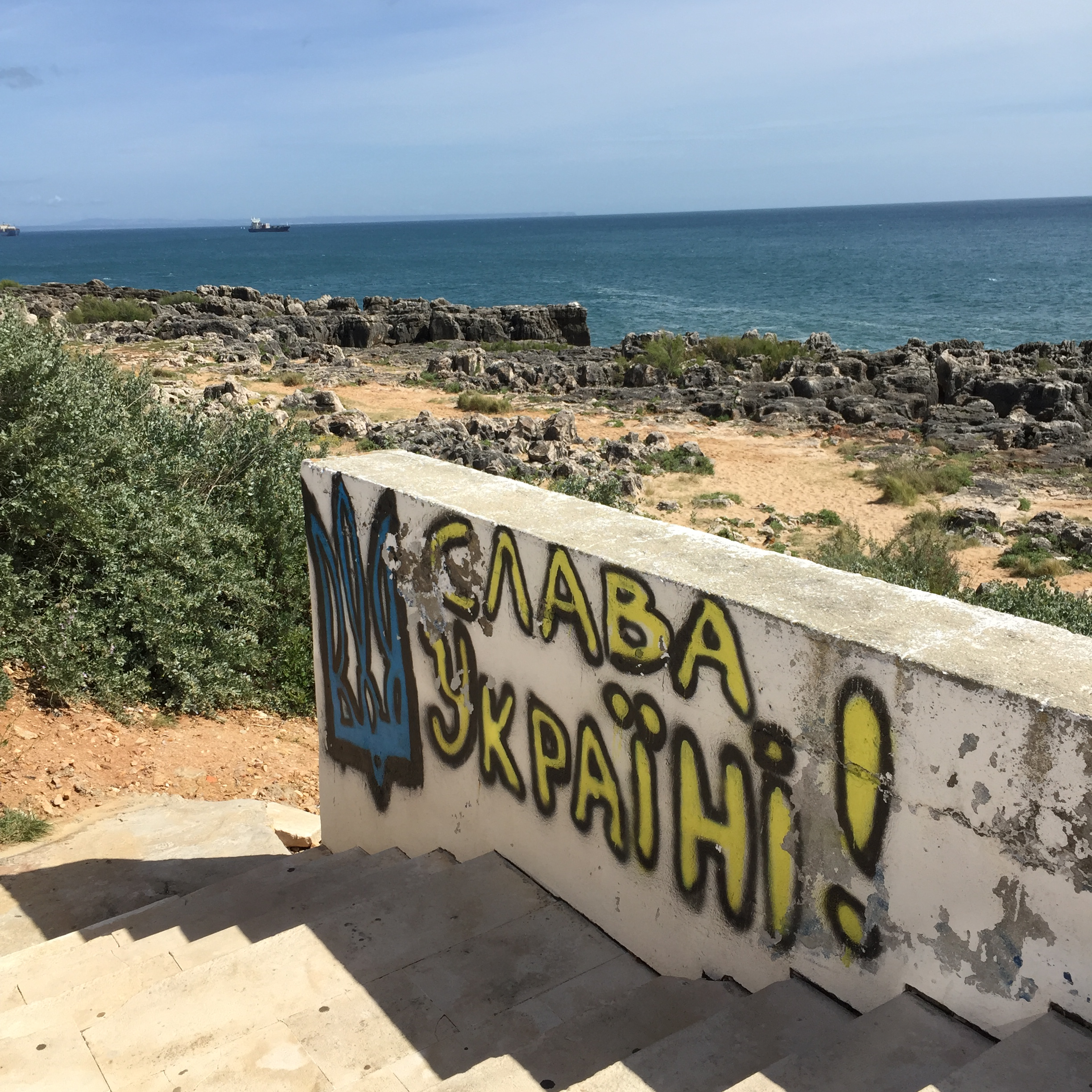
Graffiti in Lisbon.

Ukrainians constitute, since 2022, the second-largest foreign community residing in Portugal, with more than 60,000 refugees being registered in the country as a consequence of the Ukrainian Refugee Crisis. The Ukrainians retook the second place for the first time since 2012, when they numbered 44,074. Albeit contingent to the development of the 2022 Russian invasion of Ukraine, this ends a declining trend for Ukrainians residing in Portugal, from its maximum in 2002, as the largest immigrant community numbering 62,448, to fifth with 28,629 in 2020, further declining to 27,220 in 2021. Part of this decline however is due to naturalizations - from 2008 to 2021, a total of 30925 Ukrainians became Portuguese citizens.

== History of Ukrainian immigration to Portugal ==
Ukrainians began arriving in Portugal in the late 1990s, and there was a tremendous growth in the early years of the twenty-first century. In the initial phase, between 1999 and 2002, immigration was processed either in an organized manner, based on intermediaries, or through international networks of illegal recruitment of workers, disguised as travel agencies. The earliest immigrants entered the country with Schengen visas, valid throughout the Schengen Area, and remained undocumented until they were granted permanent permits.

From 2004, following the decline in investment in major public works, the economic recession and improved mechanisms for controlling illegal immigration, many Ukrainians have left the country.

Since 2009, the decline in the number of immigrants has steepened as a consequence of the economic crisis that has been occurring from 2008 on, and also due to the acquisition of Portuguese nationality by many Ukrainian citizens.

Initially, the intention of many Ukrainian immigrants was to remain in Portugal for short periods, and many of them left the country. However, many others ended up opting for a longer stay. Among these, many decided to settle permanently in Portugal, joining or forming their families in the country and seeking recognition of their academic and professional qualifications, aiming access to more skilled and better paid jobs.

== Ukrainians in Portugal today ==
Although the initial migration flow was motivated by job search and was predominantly masculine, the female component in the Ukrainian community in Portugal has increased substantially during the following years, particularly for reasons related to family reunification. According to Census 2011, women represented 49.2% of the Ukrainian population resident in Portugal, while in 2001 they were only 18.6%.

The Ukrainian population in Portugal is relatively young compared to the native Portuguese population. The average age of Ukrainians residing in Portugal is 34, lower than that of native Portuguese, which is 42.1 years.

The educational levels of individuals of working age (15–64 years) are higher than those of Portuguese nationals. According to Census 2011, 23.3% of Ukrainians in Portugal had completed college education, and only 9.7% had an academic qualification lower than the 9th grade. These values contrast with the education levels of the native Portuguese population, which were 16.6% and 40.6%, respectively.

Also, according to the 2011 Census, 71.1% of the Ukrainian population was economically active and 59.2% were employed, while 47% of the Portuguese nationals were economically active and only 41% had jobs.

Most Ukrainians in Portugal work in low-skill and low wages jobs, particularly in cleaning services, construction, manufacturing industries, transport services, hotels and restaurants. However, according to a recent survey, it was found that some Ukrainian workers have achieved jobs that are more compatible with their academic and professional qualifications.

== Support for Ukraine during the Russo-Ukrainian War ==
Following the start of Russia's full-scale invasion of Ukraine in 2022, the Ukrainian community in Portugal has regularly held solidarity events in Lisbon, Porto, and other cities, drawing attention to Russian aggression and raising funds to support Ukraine. In particular, the volunteer community With Portugal organizes weekly events in central Lisbon. As of July 2026, participants in these events had raised and transferred UAH 816,667 (approximately €16,000) to the Come Back Alive charity.

== See also ==
- Portugal–Ukraine relations
- Immigration to Portugal
- Ukrainian diaspora
