= 2023 EU–Ukraine Summit =

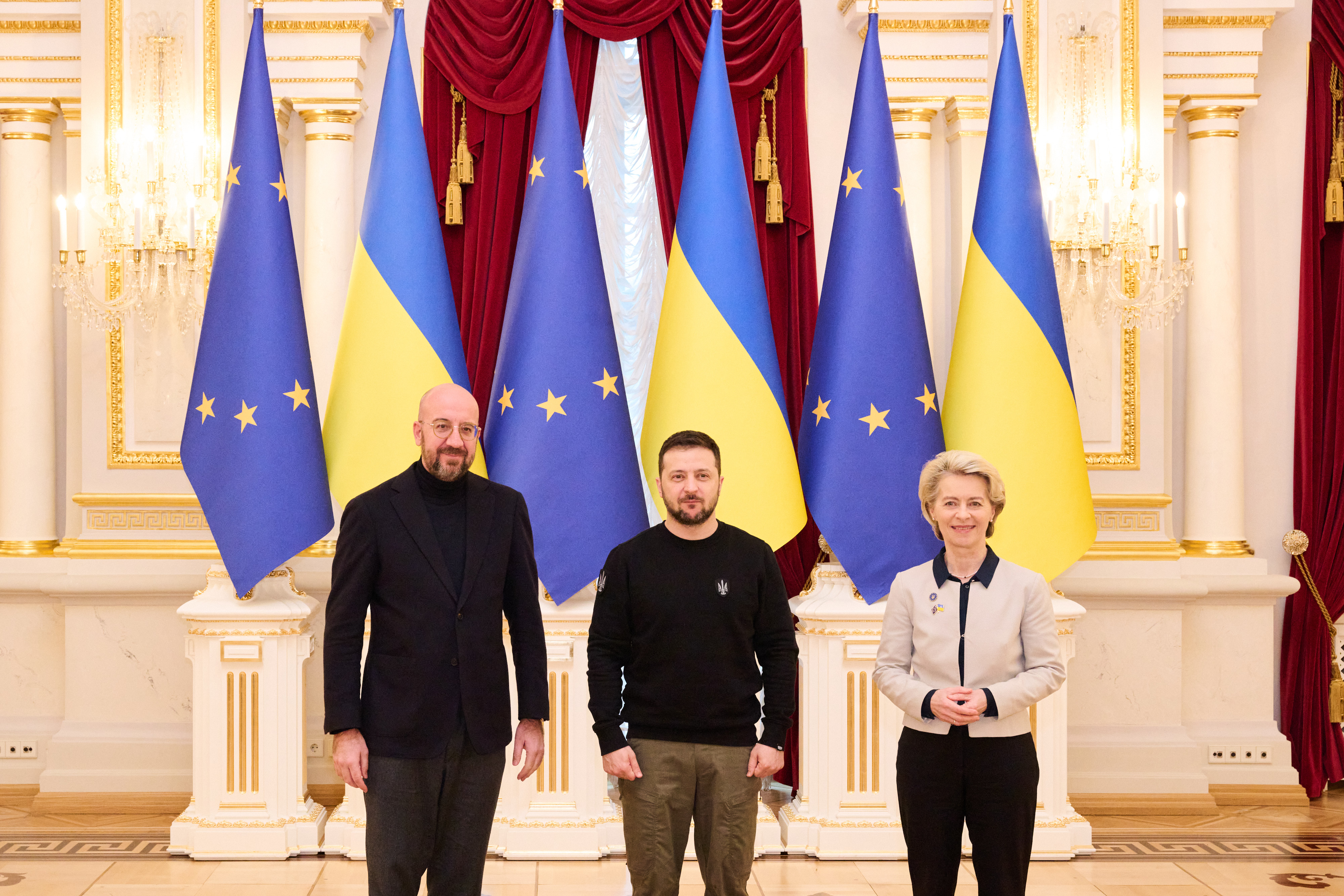
President of the European Council Charles Michel, President of the European Commission Ursula von der Leyen and President of Ukraine Volodymyr Zelenskyy on EU–Ukraine Summit in Kyiv, 3 February 2023

The 2023 EU–Ukraine Summit was a summit held in Kyiv, Ukraine on 3 February 2023. The event was dedicated to European Union–Ukraine bilateral relations in light of the Russian invasion of Ukraine in 2022. The meeting was hosted by the President of Ukraine Volodymyr Zelenskyy. The President of the European Council Charles Michel, the President of the European Commission Ursula von der Leyen and some senior EU officials also attended the event. This was the first EU-Ukraine summit since the European Council granted Ukraine the status of candidate country. The leaders issued a joint statement at the end of the summit.

== Links ==
- EU-Ukraine Summit 2023, EU Council website
