= European Union–Moldova Deep and Comprehensive Free Trade Area =

The European Union–Moldova Deep and Comprehensive Free Trade Area or EU–Moldova DCFTA is a free trade area between the European Union and Moldova. The DCFTA is a part of Moldova's EU Association Agreement. It allows Moldova access to the European Single Market in selected sectors and grants EU investors the same regulatory environment in the associated country as in the EU. The first countries to ratify the agreement with the EU were Moldova and Georgia, thus the agreement officially entered into force in July 2016, although parts of them were already provisionally applied. However, because of political instability in Ukraine, the agreement with Ukraine was provisionally applied on January 1, 2016. Only after almost one year after the agreement officially entered into force in Moldova and Georgia, the agreement finally entered into force on September 1, 2017 in Ukraine.

The main goal of DCFTA is to offer closer and stronger relations between the EU and countries that have ratified the agreement in the EU Single Market. The DCFTA is supposed to offer the free movement of goods, services, capital and people. Movement of people, however, takes the form of a visa-free regime for short stay travel, while movement of workers remains within the remit of the EU Member States. The DCFTA is an "example of the integration of a Non-EEA-Member into the EU Single Market".

== Background ==
Since 2009, the Republic of Moldova has intensified its relations with the European Union, especially after the April 7, 2009 protests triggered by the falsification of parliamentary votes by the Party of Communists of the Republic of Moldova government. This resulted to the accession of the Democrats to power. Thus, with a new parliament, Moldova started to build closer relations with the European Union. Despite the crackdown of the protests, the European Parliament announced that the Republic of Moldova would participate in the Eastern Partnership summit in Prague on May 7, 2009. This is one of the first steps to upgrade relations between Moldova and the EU. The same year, Moldova joined the EU's Eastern Partnership and the EU-Moldova Association Agreement entered into force on July 1, 2016. Through this process, the Deep and Comprehensive Freed Trade Area (DCFTA) officially took effect.

== Agreement ==
The Deep and Comprehensive Free Trade Area (DCFTA) is an arrangement between the EU and the Republic of Moldova that foresees a preferential trade relationship, based on mutually advantageous treatment, between the signatories. It gives each other better access to their respective markets, which are more comprehensive than that offered to other trading partners. This entails the elimination of the tariffs for numerous goods. It further provides for removal of obstacles to trade in services and better access for companies seeking to establish in respective markets. The DCFTA includes a number of provisions aimed at reforming the trade and trade policies of the Republic of Moldova in line with the acquis communautaire. This aims to modernise the Moldovan economy, attracting the EU investment in the country, and giving it more predictable policy environment.

Trade only obligations

- Tariff Obligations

Complete elimination of all import duties and the ban on export taxes for all EU products. Only a few agricultural goods (most of them being animal origin, sugar and grain products), which are considered sensitive in the EU, will be subject to the monitoring of trade flows. This monitoring ensures that imports of products manufactured in Moldova are in line with the country's production capacity and that there is no circumvention of taxes on products originating in other countries. In addition, a limited category of fruit and vegetables, which are subject to the EU entry price, will be liberalized (ad valorem free) under tariff quotas covering traditional trade flows.

As far as the Republic of Moldova is concerned, it is expected to eliminate all import taxes for the vast majority of products. A process liberalization phase (between 3 and 10 years, depending on the product) is foreseen for the Republic of Moldova for certain sensitive products (most agricultural, such as wine, certain processed agricultural products, meat products, fruits/vegetables, textile products). Certain products remain unaffected and are managed under tariff quotas (poultry and pig meat, certain dairy products, processed or sugar products and the like). However, the tariff quota covers traditional trade flows between the EU and the Republic of Moldova. The general liberalization of trade in agricultural products can be revised by the parties with a view to accelerating it in the third year after the entry into force of the Agreement. A possibility to resort to a general protection measure for all products (agricultural or industrial) has been requested by the Republic of Moldova for a period of 10 years. The existing mechanisms allow for a gradual liberalization of trade from Moldova, with the necessary transition periods related to the internal reform process and strengthening the competitiveness of the local industry before allowing full market opening for the EU products.

- Rules of Origin

The Republic of Moldova will apply the rules of origin that will make it possible to join the Pan-EuroMed (PEM) Convention as a cumulative manufacturing process area with the EU and other EMP countries, and favoring the regional economic integration of commodity trade. However, in order to ease the transition from the autonomous trade regime to the DCFTA by the end of 2015, the Autonomous Trade Preferences system for the Republic of Moldova will continue to be applied on the basis of the applied rules of origin (to benefit from these preferences rather than the DCFTA).

- Services and establishment

The EU and the Republic of Moldova offer each other market access for cross-border services in a wide range of areas, among other commitments included in the General Agreement on Trade in Services. In addition, the parties have agreed to widen access to the right of establishment in a wide variety of sectors, providing the right of qualified personnel to temporary work in the EU or the Republic of Moldova.

== Benefits ==
DCFTA can be advantageous on the national level or for certain companies. Theoretically, DCFTA is supposed to benefit Moldova in four ways:

1. DCFTA is beneficial for the Republic of Moldova in terms of increasing national income. In the short run, with the DCFTA contribution, an income increase of 75 million is expected for Moldova. However, in the long run the estimated increase for Moldova would be about twice as high (142 million euro). The relative changes in Moldova's national income would lead to a 5.4 percent GDP growth in the long run. Therefore, this increase will be the result of a reduction in sanitary and phytosanitary measures and trade barriers, which is 62 million euros. The second major contribution for the Republic of Moldova, in the short term, comes from the liberalization of trade in services, the value of which represents EUR 28 million.
2. It would boost trade between the EU and the Republic of Moldova. An increase in exports of 15 percent and 16 percent is expected in the short run and imports would increase by 6 percent and 8 percent in the long run. It is, therefore, expected that the DCFTA would contribute to a relative improvement of the trade balance for the Republic of Moldova in the short run. In the long run, the reduction of non-tariff measures should result in a 283-million-euro benefit to the Republic of Moldova.
3. Tightening up internal rules would improve the safety of consumer products. DCFTA, by providing a more stable and predictable trade system based on the EU law, expects to stimulate the flow of the European FDI into the country, create more businesses, and strengthen the competitiveness of the economy and its sectors.
4. Salaries in Moldova would increase by 3.1 percent in the short run and by 4.8 percent in the long run. At the same time, consumer prices are expected to fall by around 1 percent in the short run and 1.3 percent in the long run, mainly due to increased competition from imports.

== Outcome ==
Even though Moldova ratified the agreement with the EU, DCFTA does not limit Moldova's ability to export its products to other countries. Moldova also retains full sovereignty in its decisions on trade policy since it is not a member of any customs union. DCFTA is compatible with all other free trade agreements that Moldova is part. Domestic reforms in Moldova, together with the EU support, will upgrade the quality of Moldovan products and services. This will open trade opportunities well beyond the EU market and bring growth and jobs to Moldova. On 1 September 2014, the Association Agreement with the EU entered into force provisionally. Thus, just after two months since it entered into force, the Republic of Moldova starts to see good results from the Deep and Comprehensive Free Trade Area with the EU (DCFTA).

Even if the Association Agreement involves medium and long-run benefits (5-7 or even 10 years), it has already brought some tangible effects within the first two months of implementation. It is important that these benefits have been felt by the agro-industrial sector, which is considered the most sensitive to the liberalization of trade with the EU. In fact, it is remarkable that an impressive increase of 26 percent acquired in wine exports, apples increased by 2.7 times, plums by 8.1 percent, and table grapes by 5.8 percent, frozen sweetcorn over 3 times and cereals by 77 percent during the September–October 2014 time period. The increases were expressed over the previous year, thus eliminating the seasonal factor. Moreover, exports have grown so impressive despite the fact that 2014 was a less fruitful year than 2013, which posted less exports figures.

2014-2015

The total volume of Moldovan exports dropped by 14.8 percent between August 2014 and September 2015. Compared to the same period last year, the exports to the EU dropped by only 1.4 percent. Moreover, export of agricultural-food products to the EU increased by 10.8 percent, partly offsetting the decrease in exports to other destinations, especially Russia, where the fall was about 73 percent. The increase of exports exceeded expectations, and in the case of grapes, plums, and barley, the volume of exports increased by up to five times. However, the volume of exports of non-food industrial products in the EU decreased by 6.9 percent - a significantly lower rate than the decrease in exports to CIS and other countries. Thus, the EU has strengthened its main destination for exports from the Republic of Moldova, the share of which increased from 51 percent before the DCFTA to 59 percent after the first year of implementation of the agreement. In addition, Moldovan expanded its influence onto completely new markets like Spain, Sweden, Bulgaria, Czech Republic, Cyprus, Greece and Latvia.

2016–present

According to the European External Action Service (EEAS), European Union's imports from Moldova increased by 7.7 percent in 2016, to the value of €1.3 billion, an increase of 13.5 percent since 2014, the year in which the DCFTA entered into force. The European Union is Moldova's first trading partner and the first investor in the country, accounting for 66 percent of total Moldovan exports and 55 percent of total trade. The value of certain EU imports from Moldova grew more strongly, for example, agricultural imports which grew by 21 percent in 2016, worth €456 million. Data for the first half of 2017 confirms the positive trend of growth in Moldovan exports to the EU, in particular for a number of products such as sunflower seeds, nuts, grapes, dried fruits, wheat, barley, sugar, certain types of paper, textile and bedding articles. Overall, bilateral trade between the EU and Moldova has increased by 1.5 percent in 2016 to €3.3 billion. Johannes Hahn, a commissioner for European Neighbourhood Policy and Enlargement Negotiations, in a 2018 EU report, published on April 5, 2018, said :"Since the Association Agreement including the DCFTA entered into force, the EU's share in Moldova's exports has increased and accounts now for more than half of Moldova's total trade.....This is just one of many examples showing why the EU matters to the Republic of Moldova and why our partnership is beneficial to the lives of its people.

Access to the European markets and benefits from the DCFTA will further increase once Moldova has aligned its health and safety standards to those of the EU. The food safety reform will enable Moldova to export its agricultural products, notably animal products, whose safety for consumers is strictly controlled in the EU. Overall, if reforms are completed, the DCFTA is expected to boost Moldova's GDP by 5.4 percent annually.

== Brexit ==
Following the withdrawal of the United Kingdom from the European Union, the United Kingdom and Moldova signed a continuity trade agreement on 24 December 2020, based on the EU free trade agreement; the agreement entered into force on 1 January 2021. This agreement replicates the terms of the EU-Moldova DCFTA. Trade value between Moldova and the United Kingdom was worth £1,480 million in 2022.

== See also ==
- Moldova–European Union relations
- Accession of Moldova to the European Union
- Moldova–European Union Association Agreement
- Georgia–European Union Association Agreement
- Ukraine–European Union Association Agreement
- Armenia–European Union Association Agreement
- Free trade agreements of the European Union
