= Deep and Comprehensive Free Trade Area =

Free trade areas made between the EU, Georgia, Moldova, and Ukraine

European Union EFTA states participating in the EU's internal market with exceptions: Iceland, Liechtenstein, Norway, Switzerland DCFTA states with access to the EU's internal market in selected sectors: Georgia, Moldova, Ukraine

The Deep and Comprehensive Free Trade Areas (DCFTA) are three free trade areas established between the European Union, and Georgia, Moldova, and Ukraine respectively. The DCFTAs are part of each country's EU Association Agreement. They allow Georgia, Moldova, and Ukraine access to the European Single Market in selected sectors and grant EU investors in those sectors the same regulatory environment in the associated country as in the EU. The agreements with Moldova and Georgia have been ratified and officially entered into force in July 2016, although parts of them were already provisionally applied. The agreement with Ukraine was provisionally applied since 1 January 2016 and formally entered into force on 1 September 2017.

Unlike standard free trade areas, the DCFTA is aimed to offer the associated country the "four freedoms" of the EU Single Market: free movement of goods, services, capital, and people. Movement of people however, is in form of visa-free regime for short stay travel, while movement of workers remains within the remit of the EU Member States. The DCFTA is an "example of the integration of a Non-EEA-Member into the EU Single Market".

The European Parliament passed a resolution in 2014 stating that "pursuant to Article 49 of the Treaty on European Union, Georgia, Moldova and Ukraine - like any other European state - have a European perspective and may apply to become members of the Union provided that they adhere to the principles of democracy, respect fundamental freedoms and human and minority rights and ensure the rule of law", thus formally recognizing the possibility of a future EU membership of the three countries.

== DCFTA with Ukraine ==
=== Background ===
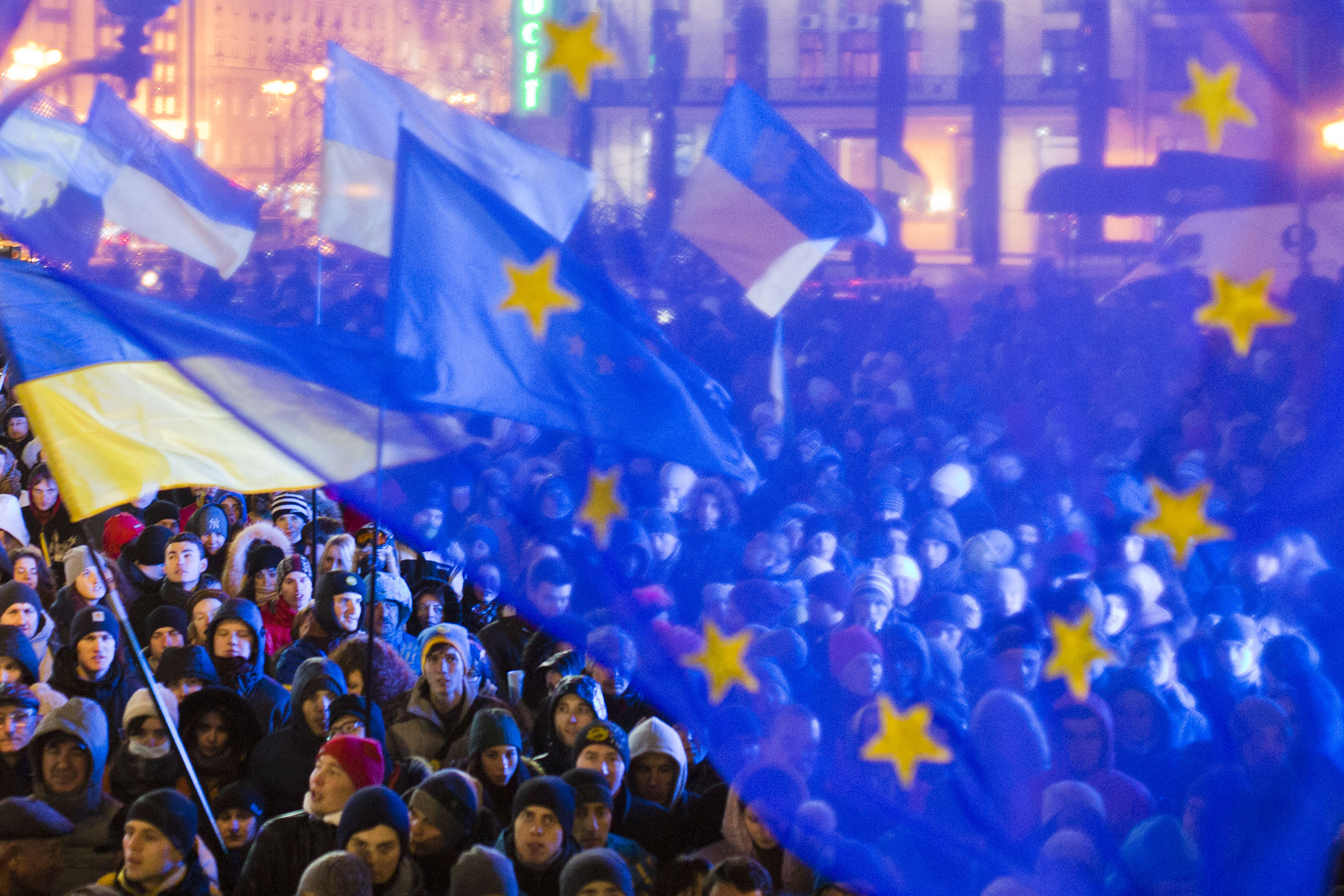
Pro-EU demonstration in Kyiv, November 27, 2013, during Euromaidan

While work on signing a deep and comprehensive free trade agreement between Ukraine and the EU first began in 1999, formal negotiations between the Ukrainian government and the EU Trade Commissioner were not launched until 18 February 2008. As of May 2011 there remained three outstanding issues to be resolved in the free trade deal: quotas on Ukrainian grain exports, access to the EU's services market and geographical names of Ukrainian commodities. Aside from these issues, the deal was ready. Despite those outstanding issues, Ukraine was ready to sign the agreement as it stood. Although it wanted stronger wording on enlargement prospects and access to the EU market for its truckers, Ukraine had more than many other candidates at the equivalent stage of the process. The finalised agreement was initialed on 19 July 2012. Ratification of the DCFTA, like the AA, has been stalled by the EU over concerns over the rule of law in Ukraine. This includes the application of selective justice, as well as amending electoral laws. As a result, the role of Ukrainian oligarchs in sanctioning the agreement was also questioned.

If Ukraine would choose the agreement, the Eurasian Economic Commission's Customs Union of Belarus, Kazakhstan and Russia would withdraw from free trade agreements with the country, according to Russian presidential advisor Sergei Glazyev. However, on 21 November 2013 a Ukrainian government decree suspended preparations for signing the agreement that was scheduled to be signed during a 28–29 November 2013 EU summit in Vilnius, and it was not signed. (Note: Ukrainian Prime Minister Mykola Azarov stated that the problem that finally blocked the EU deal were conditions proposed for an International Monetary Fund loan being negotiated at the same time, which would require big budget cuts and a 40% increase in gas bills. On 7 December 2013 the IMF clarified that it was not insisting on a single-stage increase in natural gas tariffs in Ukraine by 40%, but recommended that they be gradually raised to an economically justified level while compensating the poorest segments of the population for the losses from such an increase by strengthening targeted social assistance. The same day IMF Resident Representative in Ukraine Jerome Vacher stated that this particular IMF loan is worth 4 billion US Dollars and that it would be linked with "policy, which would remove disproportions and stimulated growth".) (Note: Ukraine and the EU started "conducting technical preparations for the upcoming dialogue between Ukraine and the EU on certain aspects of the implementation of an Association Agreement" on 5 December 2013.) The decision to put off signing the association agreement led to the 2014 Ukrainian revolution, called Euromaidan.

During the Eastern Partnership summit in Riga on 22 May 2015, the EU and its partners declared that the 'provisional application' of the DCFTA will start on 1 January 2016. However, the Riga Declaration also stated that "constructive efforts in the trilateral consultations on EU-Ukraine DCFTA implementation (...) are important", which Anders Åslund, Senior Fellow of the Atlantic Council, interpreted as meaning Russia (that has been militarily intervening in Ukraine ever since the February 2014 Revolution) would have to give consent first.

According to the EaP Civil Society Forum, the EU plans, in 2017–2020 to shift the focus of its assistance for 2017–20 to the implementation of the DCFTA to ensure legislation and parameters align with EU standards.

=== Effects ===
The EU-Ukraine DCFTA provisionally entered into force on 1 January 2016. According to European Commission, "The DCFTA will offer Ukraine a framework for modernising its trade relations and for economic development by the opening of markets via the progressive removal of customs tariffs and quotas, and by an extensive harmonisation of laws, norms and regulations in various trade-related sectors, creating the conditions for aligning key sectors of the Ukrainian economy to EU standards." "Unlike classical FTAs, it provides for both the freedom of establishment in services and non-services sectors, subject to limited reservations, and the expansion of the internal market for a set of key services sectors once Ukraine effectively implements the EU-acquis." Furthermore, Ukraine is "granted access to the EU internal market for the sectors concerned", which results in "an unprecedented level of integration".

=== Application to the United Kingdom ===
The agreement covered Ukraine–United Kingdom trade until 31 December 2020. Trade between the two countries was superseded by the Ukraine–United Kingdom Political, Free Trade and Strategic Partnership Agreement.

== Cancelled DCFTAs ==
=== Armenia ===
In addition to Georgia, Moldova and Ukraine, Armenia was also set to sign an Association Agreement with the EU, however, Armenia suddenly broke off negotiations in 2013 to pursue membership in the Eurasian Economic Union. Following a period of brief uncertainty between the EU and Armenian government, bilateral negotiations resumed on restructuring the relationship between Armenia and the EU. After extensive negotiations, Armenia and the EU finalized the Comprehensive and Enhanced Partnership Agreement (CEPA) in November 2017, deepening political and economic ties between them. The new Comprehensive and Enhanced Partnership Agreement can be seen as a "lite" version of the DCFTA, in which 96% of Armenian goods may enter the EU's single market with zero tariffs. As of 2019, the EU is Armenia's biggest export market. There are several political parties in Armenia which are opposed to Armenia's current membership in the Eurasian Economic Union. Bright Armenia, the Free Democrats and the European Party of Armenia for example, support Armenia's withdrawal from the Eurasian Economic Union and wish to begin renegotiating an Association Agreement including a DCFTA between the EU and Armenia.

On 26 March 2025, Armenia's parliament adopted a bill calling on the Armenian government to begin the process of gaining membership of the EU. This followed with renewed calls for Armenia to sign a DCFTA with the EU.

== Proposed DCFTAs ==
- In 2015, former Commissioner Cecilia Malmström proposed to start negotiations for a DCFTA with Morocco and Tunisia. Negotiations with Tunisia started in the same year.
- In December 2016, the European Commission released an assessment proposing to update and modernize the EU-Turkey Customs Union agreement. The report concludes with two options; Enhanced Commercial Framework (ECF) or Deep and Comprehensive Free Trade Agreement (DCFTA).

== Implementation timeline ==
- Armenia–European Union Association Agreement: Cancelled, 2013
- Georgia–European Union Association Agreement: 1 September 2014
- Moldova–European Union Association Agreement: 1 September 2014
- Ukraine–European Union Association Agreement: 1 January 2016

== See also ==
- Association Trio
- Eastern Partnership
- Euronest Parliamentary Assembly
- European Economic Area
- European Free Trade Association
- European Neighbourhood Policy
- EU Strategy for the South Caucasus
- Future enlargement of the European Union
- Stabilisation and Association Process
- Stability Pact for South Eastern Europe
- Ukraine–United Kingdom Political, Free Trade and Strategic Partnership Agreement
