= Moldova–European Union Association Agreement =

Association Agreement between the European Union and the European Atomic Energy Community and their Member States, of the one part, and the Republic of Moldova, of the other part
- Map of Europe with the European Union in green and Moldova in orange.
- Type: European Union Association Agreement
- Context: framework for cooperation between the EU and a non-EU country
- Signed: June 27, 2014; 11 years ago
- Location: Brussels, Belgium
- Effective: July 1, 2016; 9 years ago
- Condition: ratification by all signatories
- Signatories: European Union; European Atomic Energy Community; 28 EU member states Moldova
- Ratifiers: 31 / 31
- Depositary: General Secretariat of the Council of the European Union
- Languages: All 24 official Languages of the European Union

The Moldova–European Union Association Agreement is a treaty between the European Union (EU), Euratom, their 27 Member States and Moldova that establishes a political and economic association between the two parties.

The agreement established a Deep and Comprehensive Free Trade Area (DCFTA) between the EU and Moldova, including "the removal of import duties for most goods traded between the EU and Moldova" and "broad mutual access to trade in services for both partners".

The parties committed to co-operate and converge economic policy, legislation, and regulation across a broad range of areas, including equal rights for workers, the exchange of information and staff in the area of justice, the modernisation of Moldova's energy infrastructure, and access to the European Investment Bank. The parties committed to regular summit meetings, and meetings among ministers, other officials, and experts.

The agreement commits Moldova to economic, judicial and financial reforms to converge its policies and legislation to those of the European Union.

== History ==
The EU Association Agreement (AA) was initialed on 29 November 2013 in Brussels. It was signed on 27 June 2014 and was being provisionally applied (in particular the DCFTA) starting 1 September 2014.

On 1 July 2016, the Association Agreement (AA) between the European Union and the Republic of Moldova fully came into force, following ratification by all 31 signatories.

EU members and Moldova / States that have ratified AA

== Ratification ==
Signatory	Date	Institution	In favour	Against	AB	Deposited	Reference
Austria	8 July 2015	National Council	Approved			28 August 2015	
Austria	23 July 2015	Federal Council	Approved			28 August 2015	
Austria		Presidential Assent	Granted			28 August 2015	
Belgium
Belgium	23 April 2015	Chamber of Representatives	102	17	18	1 February 2016	
Belgium		Royal Assent (federal law)				1 February 2016	
Belgium	1 July 2015	Walloon; Parliament / (regional) (community)	63	2	4	1 February 2016	
Belgium	1 July 2015	Walloon; Parliament / (regional) (community)	61	2	4	1 February 2016	
Belgium	22 June 2015	German-speaking Community	16	2	1	1 February 2016	
Belgium	24 June 2015	French Community	71	0	8	1 February 2016	
Belgium	20 November 2015	Brussels Regional Parliament	69	3	3	1 February 2016	
Belgium	20 November 2015	Brussels United; Assembly / (FR language) (NL language)	53	3	1	1 February 2016	
Belgium	20 November 2015	Brussels United; Assembly / (FR language) (NL language)	14	0	2	1 February 2016	
Belgium	17 June 2015	Flemish; Parliament / (regional) (community)	83	18		1 February 2016	
Belgium	17 June 2015	Flemish; Parliament / (regional) (community)	88	19		1 February 2016	
Belgium	24 June 2015	COCOF Assembly	71	0	8	1 February 2016	
Bulgaria	24 July 2014	National Assembly	91	0	0	9 September 2014	
Bulgaria	28 July 2014	Presidential Assent	Granted			9 September 2014	
Croatia	12 December 2014	Parliament	119	0	0	24 March 2015	
Croatia	18 December 2014	Presidential Assent	Granted			24 March 2015	
Cyprus	7 May 2015	House of Representatives	Approved			18 August 2015	
Cyprus	22 May 2015	Presidential Assent	Granted			18 August 2015	
Czech Republic	18 March 2015	Senate	53	0	10	12 June 2015	
Czech Republic	9 April 2015	Chamber of Deputies	122	0	6	12 June 2015	
Czech Republic	19 May 2015	Presidential Assent	Granted			12 June 2015	
Denmark	18 December 2014	Parliament	101	8	0	18 February 2015	
Estonia	4 November 2014	Assembly	62	0	0	12 January 2015	
Estonia	13 November 2014	Presidential Assent	Granted			12 January 2015	
European Union and EAEC	13 November 2014	European Parliament	535	94	44	19 April 2016 (EAEC); 23 May 2016 (EU)	
European Union and EAEC		Council of the European Union				19 April 2016 (EAEC); 23 May 2016 (EU)	
Finland	10 March 2015	Parliament	Approved			6 May 2015	
Finland	24 April 2015	Presidential Assent	Granted			6 May 2015	
France	3 March 2015	Senate	Approved			3 July 2015	
France	16 April 2015	National Assembly	Approved			3 July 2015	
France	27 April 2015	Presidential Assent	Granted			3 July 2015	
Germany	8 May 2015	Bundesrat	Approved			22 July 2015	
Germany	26 March 2015	Federal Diet	Approved			22 July 2015	
Germany	27 May 2015	Presidential Assent	Granted			22 July 2015	
Greece	18 November 2015	Parliament	Approved			6 January 2016	
Greece	24 November 2015	Presidential Promulgation	Granted			6 January 2016	
Hungary	25 November 2014	National Assembly	133	0	6	7 April 2015	
Hungary	5 December 2014	Presidential Assent	Granted			7 April 2015	
(Republic of Ireland) Ireland	27 January 2015	Dáil Éireann	58	19	0	17 April 2015	
Italy	26 November 2015	Senate	151	35	11	3 February 2016	
Italy	29 July 2015	Chamber of Deputies	314	88	36	3 February 2016	
Italy	7 December 2015	Presidential Assent	Granted			3 February 2016	
Latvia	14 July 2014	Parliament	79	0	0	2 October 2014	
Latvia	18 July 2014	Presidential Assent	Granted			2 October 2014	
Lithuania	8 July 2014	Parliament	84	0	1	29 July 2014	
Lithuania	11 July 2014	Presidential Assent	Granted			29 July 2014	
Luxembourg	18 March 2015	Chamber of Deputies	55	2	0	12 May 2015	
Luxembourg	12 April 2015	Grand Ducal Promulgation	Granted			12 May 2015	
Malta	21 August 2014	House of Representatives	Approved			29 August 2014	
Moldova	2 July 2014	Parliament	59	4	0	23 July 2014	
Moldova	8 July 2014	Presidential Assent	Granted			23 July 2014	
Netherlands	7 July 2015	Senate	Adopted			21 September 2015	
Netherlands	7 April 2015	House of Representatives	Adopted			21 September 2015	
Netherlands	28 July 2015	Royal Promulgation	Granted			21 September 2015	
Poland	18 December 2014	Senate	79	0	0	24 March 2015	
Poland	5 December 2014	House of Representatives	420	0	0	24 March 2015	
Poland	29 December 2014	Presidential Assent	Granted			24 March 2015	
Portugal	20 March 2015	National Assembly	Approved			13 May 2015	
Portugal	22 April 2015	Presidential Assent	Granted			13 May 2015	
Romania	2 July 2014	Chamber of Deputies	284	1	1	14 July 2014	
Romania	3 July 2014	Senate	122	0	0	14 July 2014	
Romania	9 July 2014	Presidential Assent	Granted			14 July 2014	
Slovakia	23 September 2014	National Council	117	0	0	21 October 2014	
Slovakia	16 October 2014	Presidential Assent	Granted			21 October 2014	
Slovenia	13 May 2015	National Assembly	70	3	0	27 July 2015	
Slovenia	21 May 2015	Presidential Assent	Granted			27 July 2015	
Spain	27 May 2015	Senate	Approved			28 July 2015	
Spain	30 April 2015	Congress of Deputies	303	0	1	28 July 2015	
Spain		Royal Assent	Granted			28 July 2015	
Sweden	26 November 2014	Parliament	249	44	0	9 January 2015	
United Kingdom	9 March 2015	House of Lords	Approved			8 April 2015	
United Kingdom	23 February 2015	House of Commons	Approved			8 April 2015	
United Kingdom	19 March 2015	Royal Assent	Order Made			8 April 2015	

The 31 parties are Moldova, the EU and Euratom and the 28 EU members.

=== Ratification notes ===
Malta

The ratification was performed in accordance with article 4(2)(b) of the Maltese European Union Act, which reads that:

"Provided that with regard to treaties and international conventions which Malta may accede to as Member State of the European Union, and treaties and international conventions which Malta is bound to ratify in its own name or on behalf of the European Community by virtue of its membership within the European Union, these shall come into force one month following their being submitted in order to be discussed by the Standing Committee on Foreign and European Affairs."

As the treaty was submitted to the Standing Committee on Foreign and European Affairs on 21 July 2014, the treaty came into force as part of the Maltese legislation on 21 August 2014.

United Kingdom of Great Britain and Northern Ireland

The ratification was based on The European Union (Definition of Treaties) (Association Agreement) (Moldova) Order 2015, made in accordance with section 1(3) of the European Communities Act 1972, after having been approved by a resolution of each House of Parliament.

=== Application in the United Kingdom ===
The agreement applied to the United Kingdom as an EU-member state until Brexit on 31 January 2020. During the transition period that followed Brexit, the agreement until 31 December 2020, the agreement still applied to the UK. The UK and Moldova announced on 8 October 2020 an agreement replacing the EU-Moldova Association Agreement between them, which was provisionally applied from 1 January 2021.

== Later developments ==
In 2014 Russia imposed retaliatory trade restrictions on farming exports from Moldova in response to their signing of the Association Agreement with the EU. Amongst other measures, on August 31, Russia suspended 19 provisions of the Russia-Moldova CIS Free Trade Agreement signed in 2011.

Igor Dodon, who was elected President of Moldova in November 2016, campaigned on holding a referendum on cancelling the agreement in favour of joining the Eurasian Economic Union.

== See also ==
- European Union–Moldova Deep and Comprehensive Free Trade Area
- Moldova–European Union relations
- Accession of Moldova to the European Union
- Ukraine–European Union Association Agreement
- Georgia–European Union Association Agreement
- Armenia–European Union Association Agreement
