= Ukraine–United Kingdom relations =

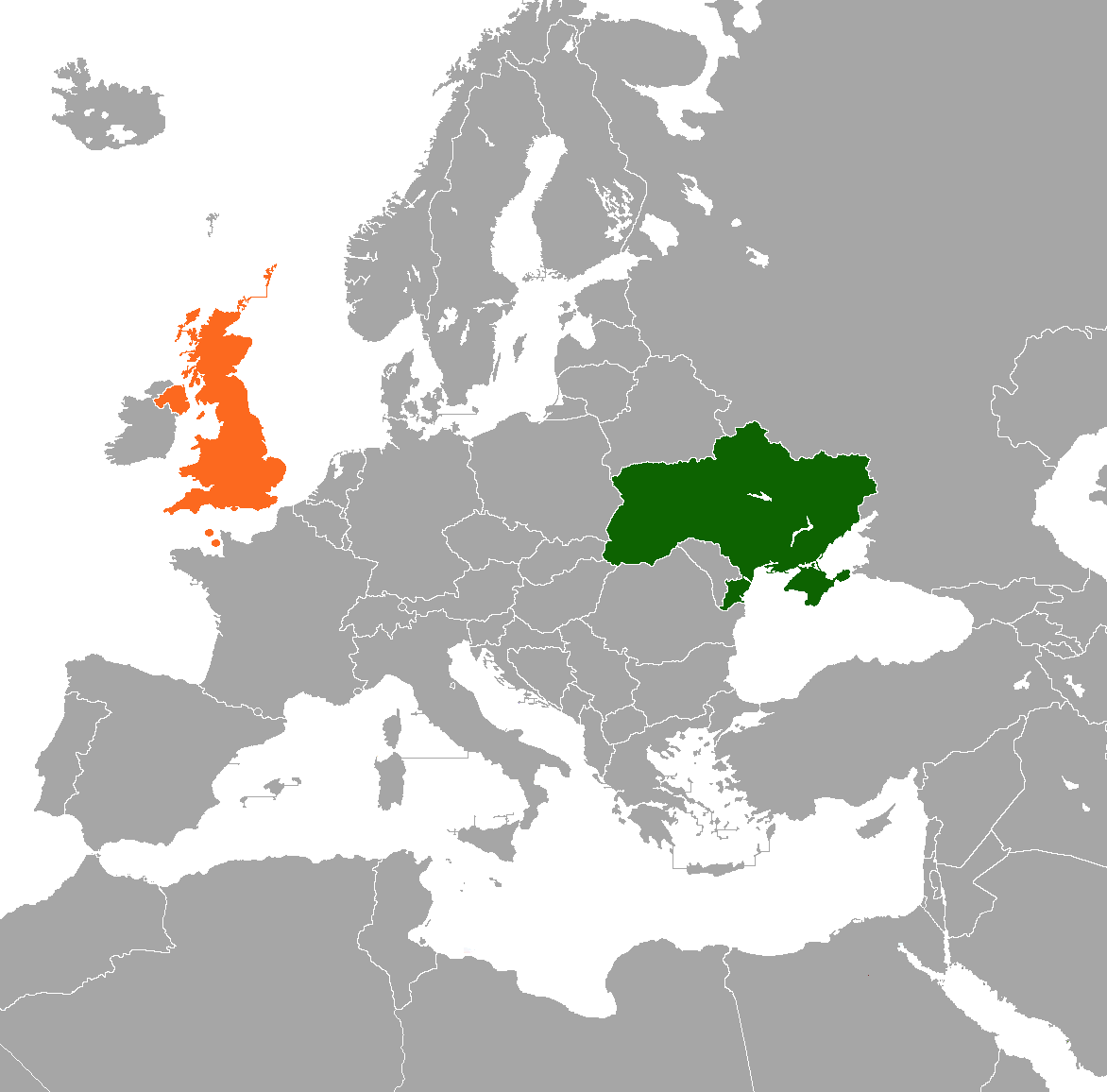

- Ukraine: United Kingdom

Diplomatic mission
- Embassy of Ukraine, London: Embassy of the United Kingdom, Kyiv

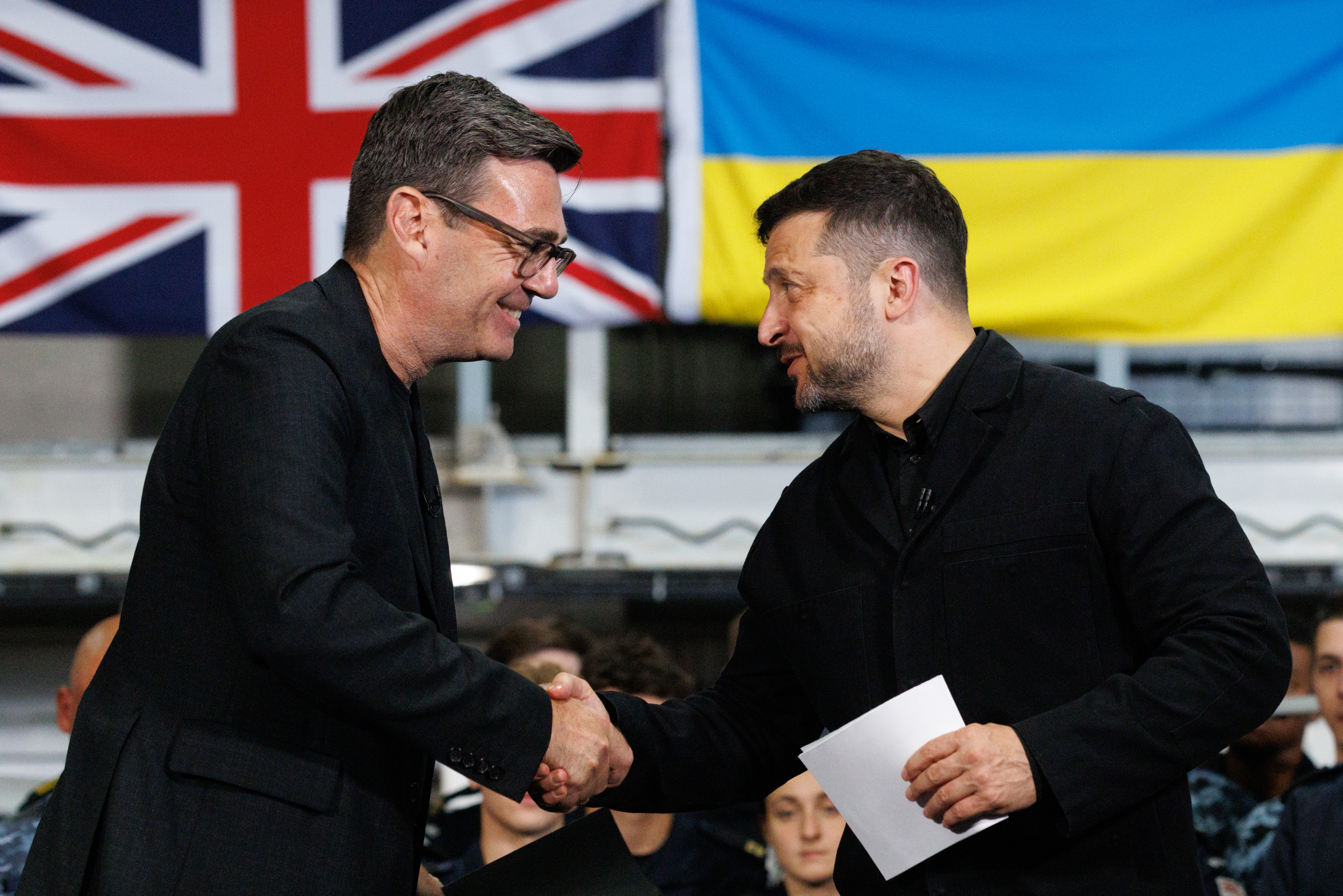
UK Prime Minister Andy Burnham and Ukrainian President Volodymyr Zelenskyy, July 2026

Relations between Ukraine and the United Kingdom have existed since Ukrainian independence from the Soviet Union in 1991. The two countries enjoy close political, military, social and economic co-operation. The UK has the sixth largest Ukrainian migrant population in Europe, with approximately 200,000 Ukrainian refugees. Since the start of the Russo-Ukrainian War, and especially following the Russian invasion of Ukraine, relations have been extremely strong as the UK has provided large amounts of military, humanitarian, financial and intelligence aid to Ukraine. Ukraine and the UK, along with Poland, agreed to form a trilateral security pact in early 2022.

Both countries share common membership of the Council of Europe, the European Court of Human Rights, the OSCE, a Trilateral Security Pact, the United Nations, and the World Trade Organization. Bilaterally the two countries have a Development Partnership, a Double Tax Convention, a Security Agreement, and a Political, Free Trade and Strategic Partnership Agreement.

== History ==
After World War II, work-permit schemes issued under the Attlee government (in office: 1945–1951) recruited Ukrainians to work in the mills of Lancashire and in the greenhouses of the Lea Valley (Middlesex/Essex). Large numbers of Ukrainians (mainly displaced persons from camps in Germany) arrived in the UK. Ukrainians were integrated into the UK as European Voluntary Workers, while Ukrainian POWs from the Polish and German armies were also demobilized and settled in the major cities of the UK.

Prime Minister Margaret Thatcher visited Ukraine in June 1990 when it was part of the Soviet Union.

=== Ukrainian independence ===
After the division of the country into republics and regions, and later in 1991 after the collapse of the country (USSR) into several countries and their independence the UK recognized the independence of Ukraine on 31 December 1991. After Ukrainian independence from the Soviet Union in August 1991, diplomatic relations between Ukraine and the United Kingdom were established on 10 January 1992. Ukraine opened an Embassy in London in October 1992 and a Consulate General in Edinburgh in February 2002. The UK Consulate-General in Kyiv opened in November 1991 and became the Embassy in January 1992.

Until 2005, the Presidents of Ukraine twice paid visits to the UK − in February 1993 and December 1995. The Prime Minister of the United Kingdom visited Ukraine in April 1996. The intensity of bilateral contacts at all levels boosted during 2008–2009. In particular, the President of Ukraine Victor Yuschenko visited the UK three times: in May, October 2008 and January 2009. As the result of the visit in May 2008, the Joint Statement that officially declared the strategic nature of Ukrainian-British relations was issued.

Since the establishment of bilateral relations in Ukrainian-British communication, a dispute over nuclear weapons has emerged as the cornerstone. Britain, as one of the permanent members of the UN Security Council and a member of the nuclear club, was extremely sensitive to Ukraine inheriting from the USSR the third-largest nuclear arsenal in the world, far exceeding Britain's arsenal. Thus the UK was one of three main initiators for signing the Budapest Memorandum on Security Assurances and one of three main security guarantors of the countries that agreed to get rid of the nuclear arsenal, in particular, Ukraine. The document refers to three identical political agreements signed at the OSCE conference in Budapest, Hungary on 5 December 1994, providing security assurances by its signatories relating to the accession of Belarus, Kazakhstan and Ukraine to the Treaty on the Non-Proliferation of Nuclear Weapons. The memorandum was originally signed by three nuclear powers, the Russian Federation, the United Kingdom, and the United States of America. China and France gave somewhat weaker individual assurances in separate documents.

=== 2014–present ===
Following the annexation of Crimea by the Russian Federation in 2014, the UK, along with other countries, stated that Russian involvement was a breach of its obligations to Ukraine under the Budapest Memorandum, a Memorandum deposited with the Secretary-General of the United Nations under the signature of Sergei Lavrov, amongst others, and in violation of Ukrainian sovereignty and territorial integrity.

Relations between the United Kingdom and Ukraine are currently very close. There are regular bilateral visits between the countries and political dialogue covers the full range of international issues.

Since the beginning of the Ukrainian revolution and Pro-Russian unrest in Ukraine, the United Kingdom has actively supported Ukraine and publicly condemned Russian actions. The UK supports Ukraine in becoming a member of the EU and NATO. In this context, London has implemented a series of sanctions and restrictive measures both in unilateral and multilateral formats against Russia, and in support of Ukrainian sovereignty.

In 2014, the following meetings took place between UK and Ukrainian politicians: a meeting between Ukrainian Prime Minister Arseniy Yatseniuk and British Foreign Secretary William Hague during the latter's visit to Ukraine (3 March); Prime Minister Arseniy Yatseniuk's meeting with UK Prime Minister David Cameron on the sidelines of the EU Summit in Brussels (6 March); meeting between the President of Ukraine Petro Poroshenko with the UK Prime Minister David Cameron during the commemorations of 70th anniversary of the Normandy landings, as well as a number of meetings at the level of foreign ministers of the two countries (3 March 7 May, 23 June).

On 12 February 2015, the second Minsk Protocol were signed. These are their proper names, but they consist of two documents: "The Package of measures for the implementation of the Minsk Agreements" and "The Declaration in Support of the Package of Measures for the Implementation of the Minsk Protocol, adopted on February 12, 2015" to prevent an armed conflict inside Ukraine between military personnel subordinate to the central government and citizens of the eastern part of Ukraine: Donetsk People's Republic and Luhansk People's Republic.

In November 2021, the UK and Ukraine signed a deal for the UK to enhance Ukraine's naval capabilities with new mine countermeasure vessels, missile boats, frigates and other naval equipment in response to a buildup of Russian forces on the Ukrainian border.

=== Military cooperation and NATO ===
The United Kingdom and Ukraine are both part of increased military cooperation and training programs as part of a long-term NATO exercise. In June 2020, NATO formally recognised Ukraine as an Enhanced Opportunities Partner, a status given to countries that have made significant contributions to NATO-led operations and missions. British Defence Secretary Ben Wallace welcomed the decision and praised current ongoing military training programs between both countries.

==== Russian invasion of Ukraine ====
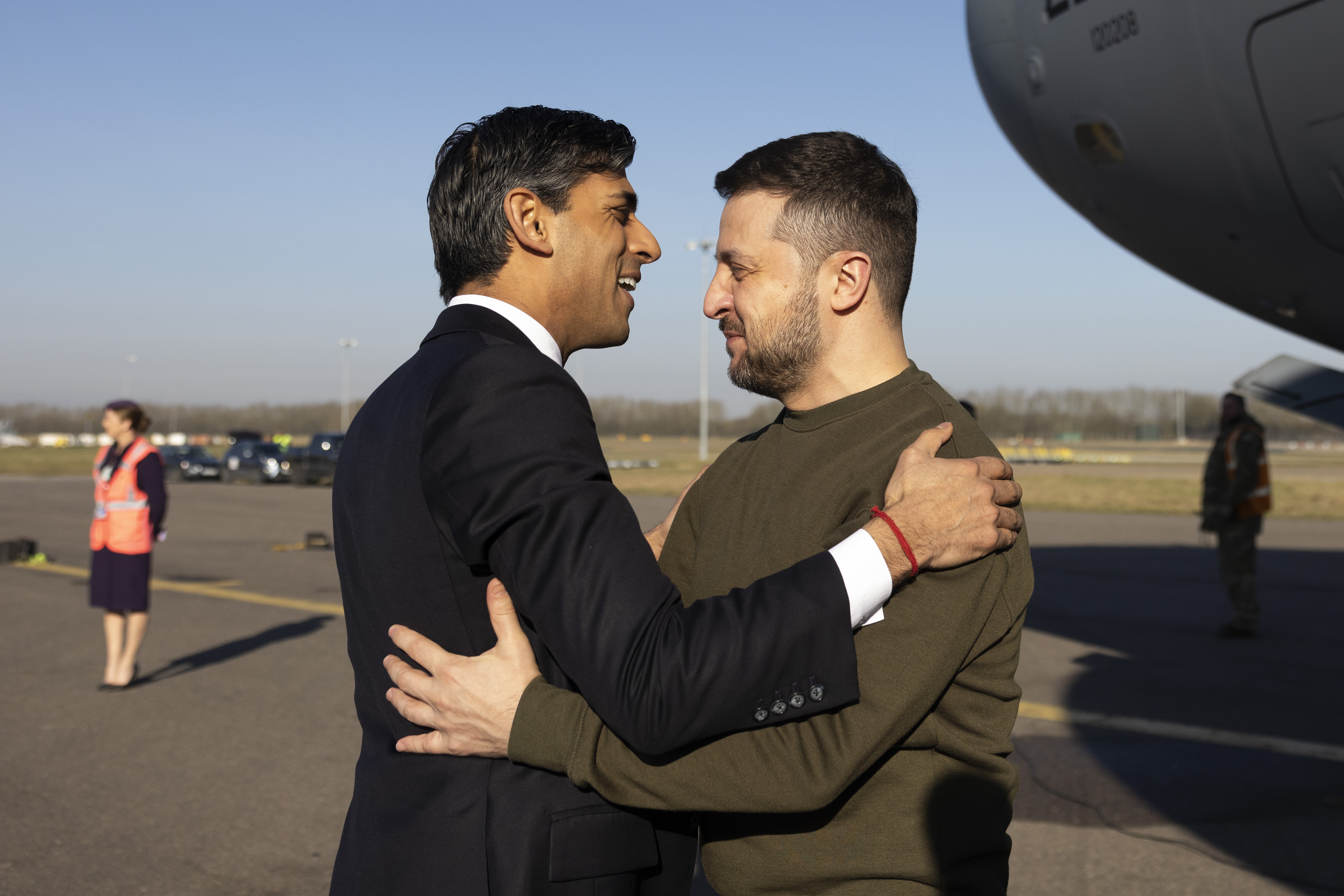
UK Prime Minister Rishi Sunak greeting Ukrainian President Volodymyr Zelenskyy at Stansted Airport.

Following the Russian invasion of Ukraine, the UK provided Ukraine substantial support in the form of defensive military aid (including around 2,000 NLAW anti-tank missile systems), humanitarian aid and retaliatory economic sanctions against Russia. Prior to this, it had trained around 22,000 Ukrainians as part of Operation Orbital. The Royal Air Force also flew surveillance aircraft to collect intelligence on Russian ground movements.

On 18 March 2022, Ukrainian respondents voted the UK the third most-supportive country to Ukraine after Poland and Lithuania in a poll carried out by Rating Group.

In response to the Russian military build-up proceeding the invasion, on 17 February 2022, the UK, Poland and Ukraine agreed a British–Polish–Ukrainian trilateral pact to strengthen strategic cooperation between the three countries. In a poll published by Rating Group, Ukrainian respondents voted in favour of closer ties to Poland and the UK as opposed to NATO membership.

Ukrainian Defence Minister Oleksii Reznikov praised the UK's efforts to support Ukraine during an official visit to the UK on 20 March 2022. He stated: "We greatly appreciate that this year, Britain was the first to provide us with serious weapons that have increased our defence capabilities. Your role is special, and your courage and your spirit are in stark contrast with the passivity of some other countries." In April that year, a road in Ukraine near Odesa was renamed by the council to 'Boris Johnson Street' (вулиця Бориса Джонсона) in honour of the UK Prime Minister's leadership in opposing the invasion.

On 7 May 2022, Britain announced that it would contribute another 1.3 billion pounds ($1.60 billion) in military and humanitarian aid to Ukraine, ahead of a planned video conversation between Group of Seven leaders and Ukrainian president Volodymyr Zelenskyy. Later in May Defence Secretary Ben Wallace said the Ministry of Defence and military attachés at British embassies were searching for Soviet and Russian manufactured defence equipment to buy and supply to Ukraine.

On 9 July 2022, the UK began leading a multinational training programme for Ukrainian forces within the UK, under Operation Interflex.

In September 2022 at the 77th UN General Debate, Prime Minister Liz Truss pledged that "we will sustain or increase our military support to Ukraine for as long as it takes", wearing a half-and-half flag pin of the Union Jack and that of Ukraine. This point was also expressed by the leader of NATO and the G7 collectively—both groups the UK is a part of—as well as British Foreign Secretary James Cleverly, adding that "when Ukraine has won this war then we will support them as they rebuild their homes, their economy, and their society."

In December 2022, Deputy Chief of the Defence Staff Lieutenant General Robert Magowan wrote that Royal Marines had supported "discreet operations" in a "hugely sensitive environment" in Ukraine, with a "high level of political and military risk". This included 350 marines from 45 Commando supporting diplomats from the British embassy and a small number of military personnel deployed in Ukraine to provide weapons and training. The Spectator had earlier reported that it had been "widely reported that British special forces were in Ukraine training local troops".

The UK was the first Western nation to pledge main battle tanks to Ukraine and the first to send long range missiles. In February 2023, British foreign secretary said in a tweet that “The UK and Ukraine are the closest of friends”.

In research published by the Munich Security Conference, Ukrainian respondents voted the UK the best performing country in response to the Russian invasion, ahead of the US, Canada and the EU.

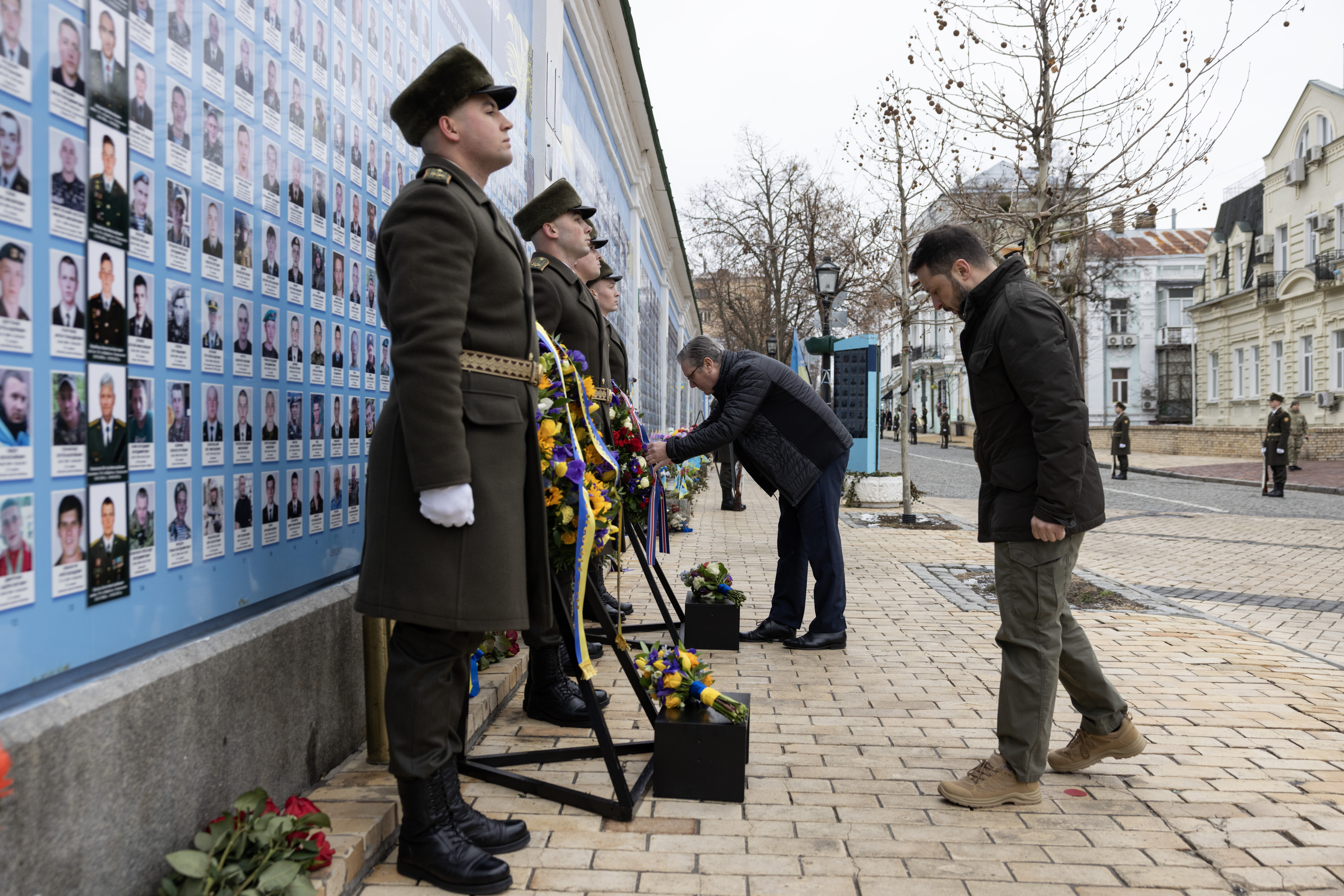
UK Prime Minister Keir Starmer and Ukrainian President Volodymyr Zelenskyy paying tribute to fallen Ukrainian soldiers at The Wall of Remembrance of the Fallen for Ukraine in Kyiv on 16 January 2025.

On 12 January 2024, Prime Minister Rishi Sunak signed the U.K.-Ukraine Agreement on Security Cooperation with President Zelenskyy and pledged a further £2.5 billion in aid to the Ukrainian government, including artillery and long-range missiles, in a move widely seen as an attempt to reaffirm Britain's support for Ukraine in the face of waning international support.

As of March 2024, the UK has pledged almost £12 billion of support to Ukraine, of which £7.1 billion is for military assistance. In each of the financial years 2022/2023 and 2023/2024 £2.3 billion was provided and £2.5 billion is planned for 2024/2025. Contributions of £500 million have also been made to the International Fund for Ukraine, and some UK military equipment supplies are funded by this fund. In addition some equipment was donated from UK defence stocks.

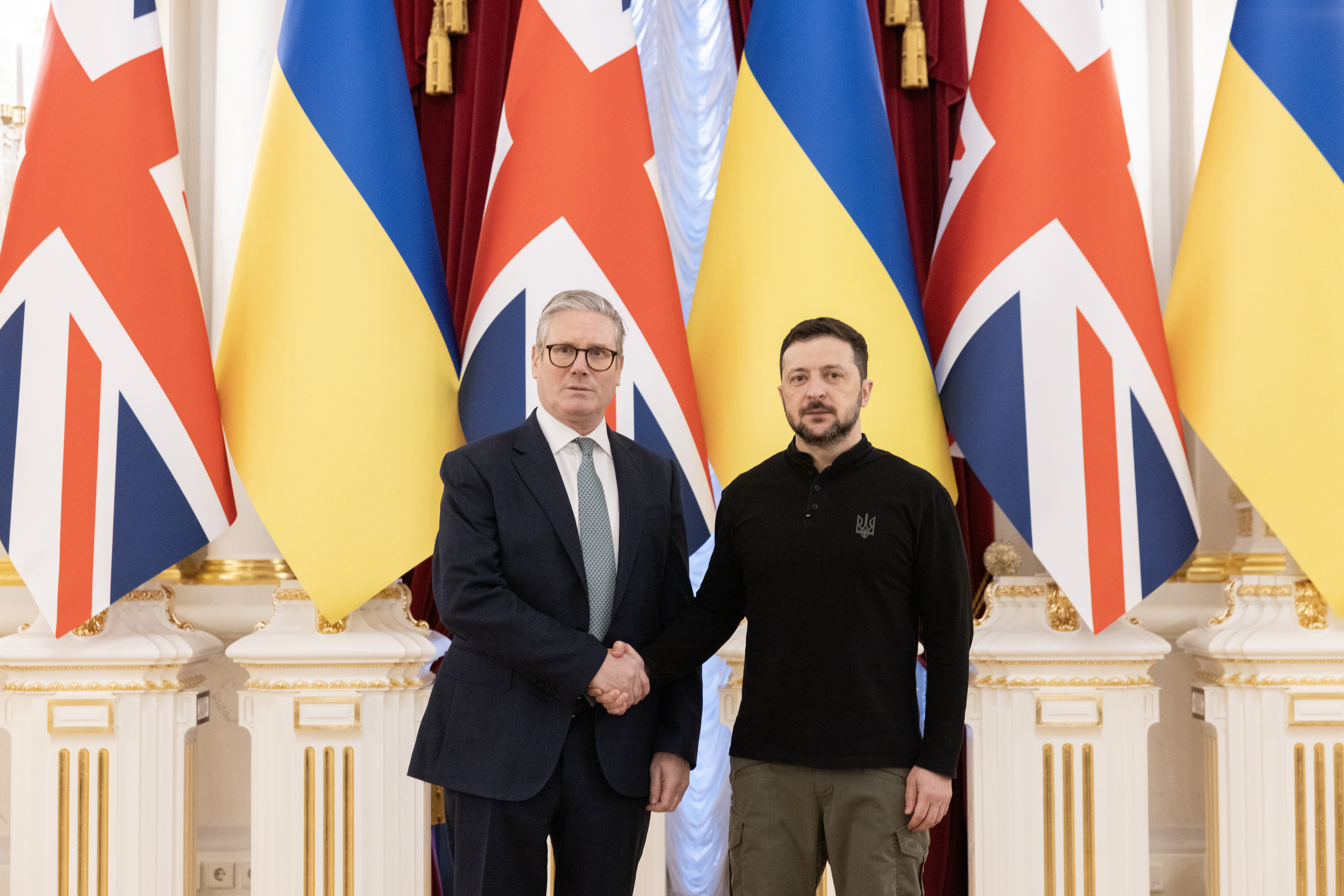
UK Prime Minister Keir Starmer with Ukrainian President Volodymyr Zelenskyy in Kyiv, January 2025.

At the 2024 NATO summit, UK Prime Minister Keir Starmer signaled that Ukraine could use Britain's donations to strike military targets inside Russia. In a meeting with Zelenskyy, Starmer called for an "irreversible" membership strategy for Ukraine to join NATO.

On 16 January 2025, British Prime Minister Keir Starmer and Ukrainian President Volodymyr Zelenskyy signed a landmark 100-year partnership agreement to deepen security ties and strengthen their countries' relationship.

In early 2025, Starmer announced that the UK would provide £4.5 billion in military support to Ukraine throughout the year, the highest annual amount ever contributed by the UK since the outbreak of the full-scale war.

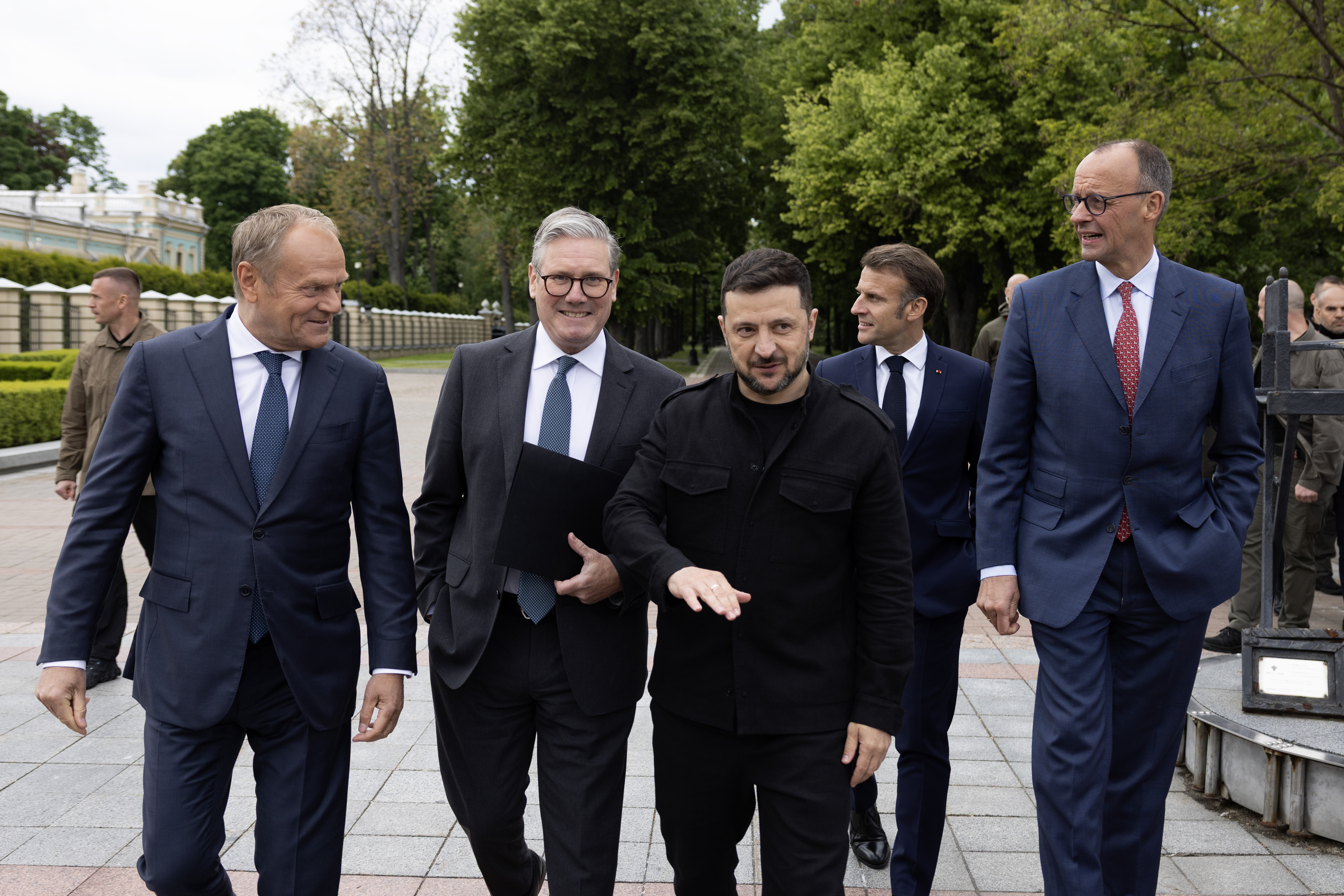
German Chancellor Friedrich Merz, French President Emmanuel Macron, UK Prime Minister Keir Starmer, and Polish Prime Minister Donald Tusk with Ukrainian President Volodymyr Zelenskyy in Ukraine in May 2025.

On 2 March 2025, British Prime Minister Keir Starmer hosted a summit in London where European leaders agreed to draft a Ukraine peace plan for the United States, aiming to secure security guarantees for Kyiv. This followed Ukrainian President Volodymyr Zelenskyy's tense meeting with U.S. President Donald Trump, raising concerns over continued American support. The UK and European nations committed to increased defense spending and potential peacekeeping roles. Starmer positioned Britain as a mediator, emphasizing Europe's need for U.S. backing while ensuring Ukraine remains central to peace talks.

On 14 October 2025, the British Ministry of Defence announced that more than 85,000 military drones had been delivered to Ukraine during the first six months of the year. This was made possible by accelerating production at British companies and investing £600 million in this sector. The drones are used for reconnaissance operations, precision strikes, and disrupting Russian activities behind the front lines.

Starmer has actively urged NATO allies to "ramp up" the provision of long-range weapons. In 2025, Starmer's government significantly expanded the UK's commitment to Storm Shadow missiles through both replenishment of national stockpiles and new supplies for Ukraine. In late 2025, he hosted the "coalition of the willing" in London to push for increased deep-strike capabilities.

As of December 2025, the UK Government had committed £21.8 billion of support for Ukraine, £13 billion in military support, up to £5.3 billion in non-military support, and £3.5 billion of UK Export Finance. In addition it has stated it will sustain £3 billion a year in military aid until 2031, and 229,900 Ukrainian refugees have been supported in the UK. The UK has also made a loan of £2.26 billion to Ukraine as its share of the G7 Extraordinary Revenue Acceleration $50 billion loan. Some UK MOD military equipment has been gifted to Ukraine, which may need to be replenished at additional cost; £2 billion to replenish ammunition stocks and improve the munitions infrastructure was announced in March 2023.

== Economic relations ==
The United Kingdom is a major trade partner of Ukraine, it is the fifth-largest investor in Ukraine.

Trade Agreements

Following Brexit, Ukraine and the United Kingdom signed a continuity (based on the EU-Ukraine trade deal) free trade agreement on 8 October 2020, which entered into force on 1 January 2021. Trade between the two countries was worth £1.4 billion in 2022.

Ukraine and the UK signed a digital trade agreement on 20 March 2023, this agreement will expand upon the existing FTA to cover digital trade between the two countries. The DTA entered into force on 1 September 2024.

On 8 February 2024, Ukraine and the UK extended tariff-free trade on majority of goods for an additional five years.

== Cultural relations ==
The 2001 Census recorded 11,913 people born in Ukraine reside in the United Kingdom. A large number of Ukrainians living in Britain are Ukrainian Catholics, under the jurisdiction of the Ukrainian Catholic Eparchy of the Holy Family of London, whilst many other Ukrainian Britons are Jews.

Ukraine won the Eurovision Song Contest 2022 but due to the 2022 Russian invasion of Ukraine, it was unable to take on hosting the next contest. The United Kingdom, which came second, hosted the contest on their behalf. The BBC announced that it would work closely with Ukrainian broadcaster UA:PBC to implement Ukrainian elements and culture into the show. The host city of Liverpool is a twin city of Odesa.

== Resident diplomatic missions ==
- Ukraine maintains an embassy in London, and a consulate in Edinburgh.
- The United Kingdom is accredited to Ukraine through its embassy in Kyiv.
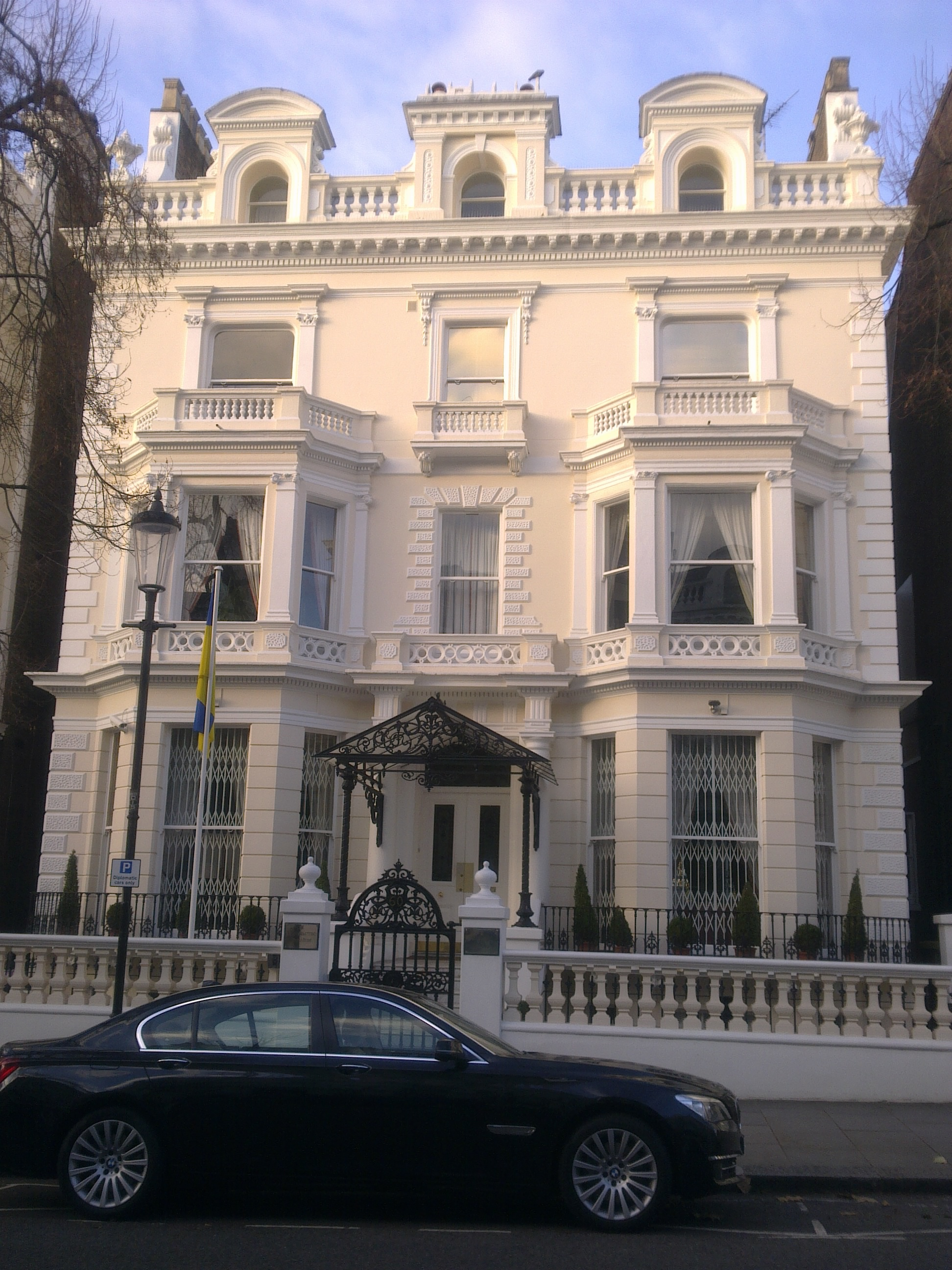
Embassy of Ukraine in London

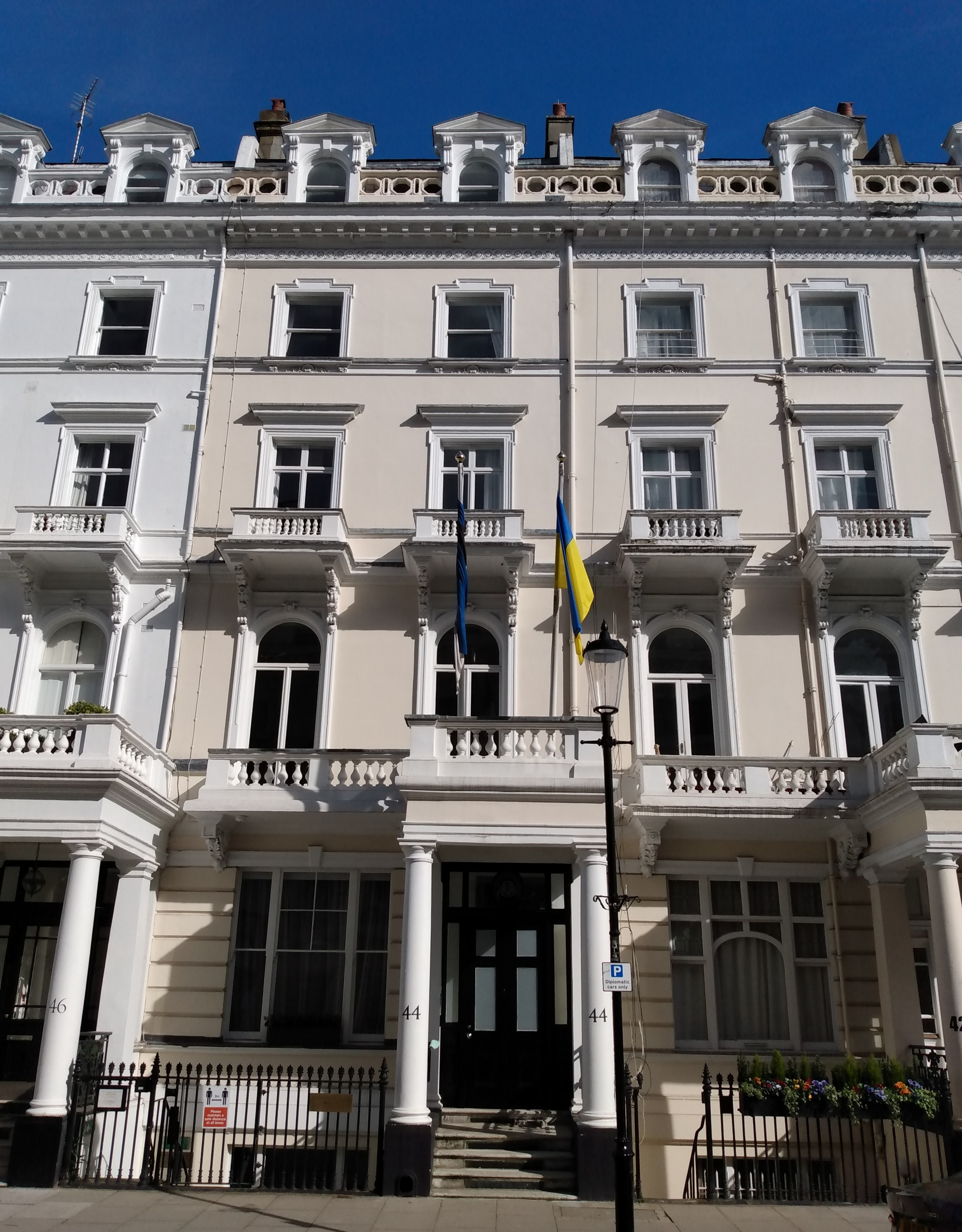
Consulate-General of Ukraine in London

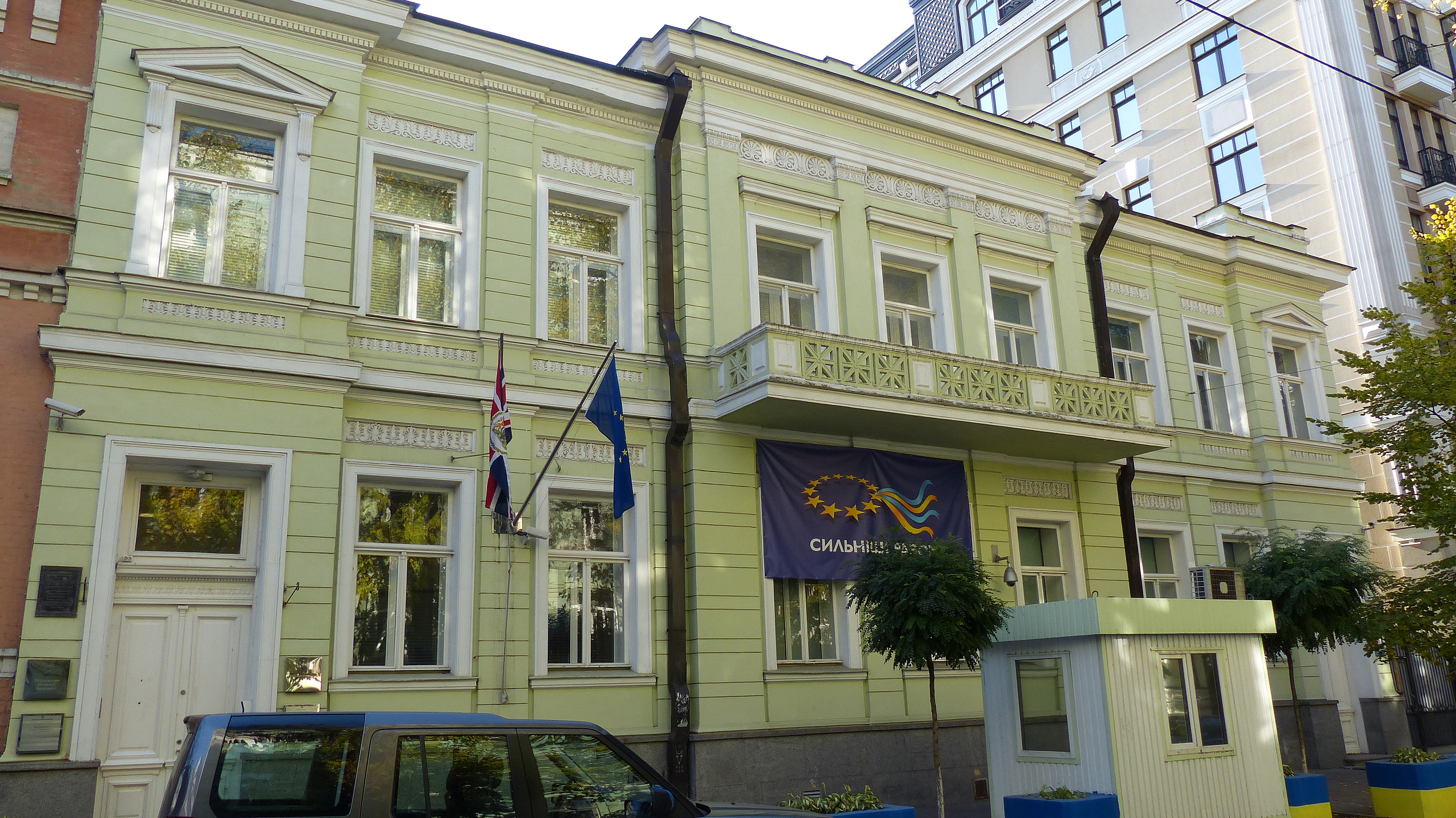
Embassy of the United Kingdom in Kyiv

== See also ==
- Foreign relations of Ukraine
- Foreign relations of the United Kingdom
- Ukraine–United Kingdom Political, Free Trade and Strategic Partnership Agreement
- Operation Interflex
- Ukrainians in the United Kingdom
