= European Union–Ukraine Association Agreement =

European Union Association Agreement

Association Agreement between the European Union and the European Atomic Energy Community and their member states, of the one part, and Ukraine, of the other part
- European Union Ukraine United Kingdom (former EU member, agreement applied until 31 December 2020)
- Type: European Union Association Agreement
- Context: Framework for cooperation between the EU and a non-EU country
- Drafted: 30 March 2012
- Signed: 21 March 2014 (Preamble, Article 1, Titles I, II & VII); 27 June 2014 (Titles III, IV, V & VI, related Annexes and Protocols)
- Location: Brussels, Belgium
- Effective: 1 September 2017
- Condition: Ratification by all signatories
- Provisional application: 1 November 2014 (Titles III, V, VI, & VII to the extent it is EU competence); 1 January 2016 (Title IV, to the extent it is EU competence)
- Signatories: European Union (and the -then- 28 EU member states); European Atomic Energy Community; Ukraine
- Ratifiers: 31 / 31
- Depositary: General Secretariat of the Council of the European Union
- Languages: All official languages of the European Union and Ukrainian

The European Union–Ukraine Association Agreement is a European Union association agreement between the European Union (EU), the European Atomic Energy Community (Euratom), Ukraine and the EU's 28 member states at the time (which are separate parties in addition to the EU and Euratom). It establishes a political and economic association between the parties. The agreement entered into force on 1 September 2017; previously parts had been provisionally applied. The parties committed to co-operate and converge economic policy, legislation, as well as regulation across a broad range of areas, including equal rights for workers, steps towards visa-free movement of people, the exchange of information and staff in the area of justice, the modernisation of Ukraine's energy infrastructure and access to the European Investment Bank (EIB). The parties committed to regular summit meetings and meetings among ministers, other officials and experts. The agreement furthermore establishes a Deep and Comprehensive Free Trade Area between the parties.

The agreement commits Ukraine to economic, judicial and financial reforms to converge its policies and legislation to those of the European Union. Ukraine commits to gradually conform to EU technical and consumer standards. The EU agrees to provide Ukraine with political and financial support, access to research and knowledge, and preferential access to EU markets. The agreement commits both parties to promote a gradual convergence toward the EU's Common Security and Defence Policy and European Defence Agency policies.

The agreement comes after more than two decades in which both parties sought to establish closer ties with each other. On the one hand, the European Union wants to ensure that its imports of grain and natural gas from Ukraine, as well as its exports of goods to Ukraine, are not threatened by instability in the region, believing that instability could eventually be reduced through sociopolitical and economic reforms in Ukraine. Ukraine, on the other hand, wants to increase its exports by benefiting from free trade with the European Union while attracting desirable external investments, as well as establishing closer ties with a sociopolitical entity to which many Ukrainians feel strong cultural connection. Western Ukraine is found to be generally more enthusiastic about EU membership than Eastern Ukraine.

The political provisions of the treaty were signed on 21 March 2014 after a series of events that had stalled its ratification culminated in a revolution in Ukraine and overthrow of the then incumbent president of Ukraine, Viktor Yanukovych. This ousting was sparked by Yanukovych's last-minute refusal to sign the agreement. Russia, Ukraine's second largest trading partner, instead presented an association with the existing Customs Union of Russia, Belarus, and Kazakhstan as an alternative. After 21 March 2014, matters relating to trade integration were temporarily set aside (awaiting the results of the 25 May 2014 Ukrainian presidential elections) until the European Union and the new Ukrainian president Petro Poroshenko signed the economic part of the Ukraine–European Union Association Agreement on 27 June 2014, and described this as Ukraine's "first but most decisive step" towards EU membership.

Titles III, V, VI and VII, and the related Annexes and Protocols of the Agreement have been provisionally applied since 1 November 2014, while Title IV has been applied from 1 January 2016, as far as the provisions concern EU competences. Provisions formally came into force on 1 September 2017 following ratification of the Agreement by all signatories.

== Provisions ==
The agreement requires regular summits between the president of the European Council and the president of Ukraine. Members of the Council of the European Union and the Cabinet of Ministers of Ukraine must also meet regularly, as well as members of the European Parliament and the Ukrainian Parliament, and other officials and experts from both parties.

The agreement also commits both parties to cooperate and converge policy, legislation, and regulation across a broad range of areas. These include: equal rights for workers, steps towards visa-free movement of people, the exchange of information and staff in the area of justice, the modernisation of Ukraine's energy infrastructure, access to the European Investment Bank, and a variety of others.

The agreement also commits Ukraine to an agenda of economic, judicial and financial reforms and to gradual approximation of its policies and legislation to those of the European Union. Ukraine has also committed to take steps to gradually conform to technical and consumer standards upheld by the European Union. In exchange, the European Union will provide Ukraine with political and financial support, access to research and knowledge, and preferential access to EU markets. The agreement also commits both parties to promote a gradual convergence in the area of foreign and security policy, specifically the EU's Common Security and Defence Policy and policies set forth by the European Defence Agency.

Ukraine will also ensure that its relevant national bodies participate fully in the European and international organisations for standardisation, legal and fundamental metrology, and conformity assessment including accreditation in accordance with its area of activity and the membership status available to it.

Ukraine will also progressively transpose the corpus of European standards (EN) as national standards, including the harmonised European standards. Simultaneously with such transposition, Ukraine will withdraw conflicting national standards, including its application of interstate standards (GOST/ГОСТ), developed before 1992. In addition, Ukraine will progressively fulfill the other conditions for membership, in line with the requirements applicable to full members of the European Standardisation Organisations.

Ukraine will approximate its sanitary and phytosanitary and animal welfare legislation to that of the EU.

=== Trade ===
The parties will progressively establish a free trade area known as the Deep and Comprehensive Free Trade Area (DCFTA) over a transitional period of a maximum of 10 years starting from the entry into force of the agreement.

Each party will reduce or eliminate customs duties on originating goods of the other party. Ukraine will eliminate customs duties on imports for certain worn clothing and other worn articles. Both parties will not institute or maintain any customs duties, taxes or other measures having an equivalent effect imposed on, or in connection with, the exportation of goods to the territory of each other. Existing customs duties or measures having equivalent effect applied by Ukraine will be phased out over a transitional period. Each party is restricted from maintaining, introducing or reintroducing export subsidies or other measures with equivalent effect on agricultural goods destined for the territory of the other party.

The parties will establish an expert-level Dialogue on Trade Remedies as a forum for cooperation in trade remedies matters. The Dialogue will seek to enhance a party's knowledge and understanding of the other party's trade remedy laws, policies and practices; improve cooperation between the parties' authorities having responsibility for trade remedies matters; discuss international developments in the area of trade defence; and to cooperate on any other trade remedies matter.

The parties will strengthen their cooperation in the field of technical regulations, standards, metrology, market surveillance, accreditation and conformity assessment procedures with a view to increase mutual understanding of their respective systems and facilitate access to their respective markets. In their cooperation, the parties will seek to identify, develop and promote trade-facilitating initiatives which may include: the reinforcement of regulatory cooperation through the exchange of information, experience and data; scientific and technical cooperation, with a view to improve the quality of their technical regulations, standards, testing, market surveillance, certification, and accreditation, and making efficient use of regulatory resources; promote and encourage cooperation between their respective organisations, public or private, responsible for metrology, standardisation, testing, market surveillance, certification and accreditation; foster the development of the quality infrastructure for standardisation, metrology, accreditation, conformity assessment and the market surveillance system in Ukraine; promote Ukrainian participation in the work of related European organisations; and seek solutions to trade barriers that may arise; coordinate their positions in international trade and regulatory organisations such as the WTO and the United Nations Economic Commission for Europe (UN-ECE).

Ukraine will take the necessary measures in order to gradually achieve conformity with EU technical regulations and EU standardisation, metrology, accreditation, conformity assessment procedures and the market surveillance system, and undertakes to follow the principles and practices laid down in relevant EU Decisions and Regulations. For this purpose Ukraine will:

- incorporate the relevant EU acquis into its legislation;
- make the administrative and institutional reforms that are necessary to implement the association agreement and the Agreement on Conformity Assessment and Acceptance of Industrial Products (ACAA); and
- provide the effective and transparent administrative system required for the implementation of these matters.

While work on signing a deep and comprehensive free trade agreement between Ukraine and the EU first began in 1999, formal negotiations between the Ukrainian government and the EU Trade Commissioner were not launched until 18 February 2008. As of May 2011 there remained three outstanding issues to be resolved in the free trade deal: quotas on Ukrainian grain exports, access to the EU's services market and geographical names of Ukrainian commodities. Aside from these issues, the deal was ready. Despite those outstanding issues, Ukraine was ready to sign the agreement as it stood. Although it wanted stronger wording on enlargement prospects and access to the EU market for its truckers, Ukraine had more than many other candidates at the equivalent stage of the process. The finalised agreement was initialed on 19 July 2012. Ratification of the DCFTA, like the AA, has been stalled by the EU over concerns over the rule of law in Ukraine. This includes the application of selective justice, as well as amending electoral laws. As a result, the role of Ukrainian oligarchs in sanctioning the agreement was also questioned.

If Ukraine were to choose the agreement, the Eurasian Economic Commission's Customs Union of Belarus, Kazakhstan and Russia would withdraw from free trade agreements with the country, according to Russian presidential advisor Sergei Glazyev. However, on 21 November 2013, a Ukrainian government decree suspended preparations for signing the agreement that was scheduled to be signed during a 28–29 November 2013 EU summit in Vilnius, and it was not signed. (Note: Ukrainian prime minister Mykola Azarov stated that the problem that finally blocked the EU deal were conditions proposed for an International Monetary Fund loan being negotiated at the same time, which would require big budget cuts and a 40% increase in gas bills. On 7 December 2013 the IMF clarified that it was not insisting on a single-stage increase in natural gas tariffs in Ukraine by 40%, but recommended that they be gradually raised to an economically justified level while compensating the poorest segments of the population for the losses from such an increase by strengthening targeted social assistance. The same day IMF Resident Representative in Ukraine Jerome Vacher stated that this particular IMF loan is worth 4 billion US Dollars and that it would be linked with "policy, which would remove disproportions and stimulated growth".) (Note: Ukraine and the EU started "conducting technical preparations for the upcoming dialogue between Ukraine and the EU on certain aspects of the implementation of an Association Agreement" on 5 December 2013.) The decision to put off signing the association agreement led to 2014 Ukrainian revolution.

== Background ==
=== Ukraine ===
Beginning in the late 18th century most of Ukraine was first part of the Russian Empire. Afterwards, Western Ukraine was part of the Austro-Hungarian Empire and then passed to the Second Polish Republic until the 1939 Soviet invasion of Poland. Ukraine then joined the Soviet Union (both the Russian SFSR and the Ukrainian SSR united into the Soviet Union from 1922) until Ukraine declared independence from the Soviet Union on 24 August 1991. Independent Ukraine (since 1991) originally maintained strong ties with Russia, and as such Ukraine's economy became integrated with the Russian economy.

Before signing the treaty, about a third of Ukraine's foreign trade was with the European Union (EU); another third was with Russia.

=== European Union ===
The European Coal and Steel Community was constituted in 1952, consisting of six Western European countries. This would lead to the European Union in 1992 as central powers increased, and membership increase reached 28 by 2013. The Union has a common market, and has amongst others the competency to conclude trade agreements. The Union only has competence transferred to it from its member states, and thus when a treaty includes areas where it has no competence, the member states become a party to the treaty alongside the Union.

== History ==
On 22 July 2008, it was announced that a "Stabilisation and Association"-type agreement would be signed between Ukraine and the European Union. However, in 2011 the European Union High Representative for Foreign Affairs, Catherine Ashton, warned Ukraine that although talks about a European Union Association Agreement with Ukraine would continue, the ratification process of the treaty "will face problems if there is no reversal in the approach of Ukrainian authorities" towards the trial of former Prime Minister of Ukraine Yulia Tymoshenko. The association agreement has to be ratified by all member states and the European Parliament for the document to take effect. The sentencing of Tymoshenko to seven years in prison on 11 October 2011 was met with national and international protest and threatened Ukraine–European Union relations. Tymoshenko herself stated that her imprisonment should not stop the European Union from establishing closer ties with Ukraine. The signing of an association agreement between Ukraine and the European Union, although finalised, was postponed on 19 December 2011. According to a joint statement by Ukraine and the EU adopted on a Ukraine-EU Summit, the ratification of the treaty depended on Ukraine's "respect for common values and the rule of law with an independent judiciary". The European Commissioner for Enlargement and European Neighbourhood Policy, Štefan Füle, stated on 27 February 2012 that he "hoped" the association agreement would be initialed within a month and he "saw" it would be signed next autumn. He also noted "the need for action in six key areas" (mainly juridical reform and democratic freedoms). On 29 February 2012 the European People's Party demanded the immediate release of Yulia Tymoshenko, Yuriy Lutsenko and other political prisoners, and insisted that the association agreement between Ukraine and the European Union should not be signed and ratified until these demands were met.

=== Initial steps ===
The EU Association Agreement (AA) was initialed on 30 March 2012 in Brussels. The treatment and sentencing (considered by EU leaders as a politically motivated trial) of former Prime Minister of Ukraine Yulia Tymoshenko had strained the relations between the EU and Ukraine. The European Union and several of its member states, notably Germany, had pressured Ukrainian president Viktor Yanukovich and his Azarov Government to halt the detention of Tymoshenko in fear of her degrading health. Several meetings with Yanukovich had been deserted by EU leaders, including the German president Joachim Gauck.

At the request of opposition politicians in Ukraine, EU government officials boycotted the UEFA Euro 2012 championship in Ukraine. EU leaders suggested that the AA, and the Deep and Comprehensive Free Trade Area, could not be ratified unless Ukraine addressed concerns over a "stark deterioration of democracy and the rule of law", including the imprisonment of Tymoshenko and Yuriy Lutsenko in 2011 and 2012.

A 10 December 2012 statement by the EU Foreign Affairs Council "reaffirms its commitment to the signing of the already initialed Association Agreement, including a Deep and Comprehensive Free Trade Area, as soon as the Ukrainian authorities demonstrate determined action and tangible progress in the three areas mentioned above, possibly by the time of the Eastern Partnership Summit in Vilnius in November 2013". These three areas are: "Electoral, judiciary and constitutional reforms (in line with international standards are integral parts of it and commonly agreed priorities)".

Kostiantyn Yelisieiev, Ukraine's ambassador to the EU, responded in February 2013 by rejecting any preconditions by the EU for signing the AA. However, on 22 February 2013, a resolution was approved by 315 of the 349 registered members of the Verkhovna Rada stating that "within its powers" the parliament would ensure that the 10 December 2012 EU Foreign Affairs Council "recommendations" are implemented. At the 16th EU-Ukraine summit of 25 February 2013, The president of the European Council, Herman Van Rompuy, followed up on the December 2012 EU Foreign Affairs Council statement by reiterating the EU's "call for determined action and tangible progress in these areas – at the latest by May, this year". The same day President Yanukovych stated Ukraine will "do its best" to satisfy the EU's requirements. At the time President Yanukovych was also in negotiations with Russia to "find the right model" for cooperation with the Customs Union of Belarus, Kazakhstan and Russia. But also on 25 February 2013 President of the European Commission José Manuel Barroso made it clear that "one country cannot at the same time be a member of a customs union and be in a deep common free-trade area with the European Union".

To coordinate preparation of Ukraine for European integration, the Government of Ukraine adopted a Plan on Priority Measures for European Integration of Ukraine for 2013. Successful implementation of the plan was assumed to be one of the conditions necessary for signing of the Association Agreement, planned for 29 November 2013 during the Eastern Partnership Summit in Vilnius.

In March 2013, Stefan Fuele, the EU's Commissioner for Enlargement, informed the European Parliament that while Ukrainian authorities had given their "unequivocal commitment" to address the issues raised by the EU, several "disturbing" recent incidents, including the annulment of Tymoshenko's lawyer Serhiy Vlasenko's mandate in the Verkhovna Rada (Ukraine's parliament), could delay the signing of the agreements. However, the next day the Ukrainian Ministry of Foreign Affairs expressed its optimism that they would still be signed in November. On 7 April 2013 a decree by President Yanukovych freed Lutsenko from prison and exempted him, and his fellow Minister in the second Tymoshenko Government Heorhiy Filipchuk, from further punishment. On 3 September 2013, at the opening session of the Verkhovna Rada after the summer recess, President Yanukovych urged his parliament to adopt laws so that Ukraine would meet the EU criteria and be able to sign the Association Agreement in November 2013. On 18 September, the Ukrainian cabinet unanimously approved the draft association agreement. On 25 September 2013 Chairman of the Verkhovna Rada Volodymyr Rybak stated that he was sure that his parliament would pass all the laws needed to fit the EU criteria for the Association Agreement since, except for the Communist Party of Ukraine, "the Verkhovna Rada has united around these bills". (Note: The Communist Party of Ukraine wants Ukraine to join the Customs Union of Belarus, Kazakhstan and Russia.) On 20 November 2013, the EU's Commissioner for Enlargement, Stefan Fuele, stated he expected that the Verkhovna Rada would the next day consider and adopt the remaining bills necessary for the signing of the association agreement, planned for 29 November 2013.

=== Stalling ===
We know how much Ukrainian people feel European, how much they care about Europe. We will, of course, now pursue our conversations with our Ukrainian partners, knowing well that we should always respect Ukraine's sovereign decisions.

— José Manuel Barroso, President of the European Commission, at the 28–29 November 2013 EU summit in Vilnius (29 November 2013)

On 21 November 2013, the Verkhovna Rada failed to pass any of the six motions on allowing the former prime minister Yulia Tymoshenko to receive medical treatment abroad, which was an EU demand for signing the association agreement. The same week Tymoshenko had stated that she was ready to ask the EU to drop the demand for her freedom if it meant President Viktor Yanukovych would sign the association agreement. The same day a Ukrainian government decree suspended preparations for signing of the association agreement; instead it proposed the creation of a three-way trade commission between Ukraine, the European Union and Russia that would resolve trade issues between the sides. Prime Minister Mykola Azarov issued the decree in order to "ensure the national security of Ukraine" and in consideration of the possible ramifications of trade with Russia (and other CIS countries) if the agreement was signed on a 28–29 November summit in Vilnius. According to Ukrainian Deputy Prime Minister Yuriy Boyko Ukraine will resume preparing the agreement "when the drop in industrial production and our relations with CIS countries are compensated by the European market, otherwise our country's economy will sustain serious damage". Some EU diplomats were more skeptical of the reasons put forward. Later on 21 November 2013, the Russian presidential press secretary, Dmitry Peskov, called the Ukrainian decree "a strictly internal and sovereign decision of the country, and we think we have no right to comment on it" and stated that Russia was prepared to have tripartite negotiations with Ukraine and the EU on trade and economic issues while at the same time numerous Russian institutions started what was described as a campaign of threats, insults and preemptive trade restrictions against Ukrainian businesses.

The European Parliament's monitoring mission in Ukraine stated (also on 21 November 2013) that there was still a possibility to sign the EU-Ukraine Association Agreement. The same day Ukrainian president Viktor Yanukovych stated "an alternative for reforms in Ukraine and an alternative for European integration do not exist...We are walking along this path and are not changing direction". (Note: The president of Lithuania, Dalia Grybauskaitė, stated on 22 November 2013 that Yanukovych had told her in a telephone conversation that he could not sign the association agreement because Russia had threatened Ukraine with restrictions on its commodities imports to Russia and he believed that this would make Ukraine suffer billions in losses.)

In the following days, Euromaidan, the biggest protests since the Orange Revolution, were being held in Kyiv by opposition parties. On 26 November 2013, the Ukrainian Government admitted that Russia had asked it to delay signing the EU association agreement and that it "wanted better terms for the EU deal". "As soon as we reach a level that is comfortable for us, when it meets our interests, when we agree on normal terms, then we will be talking about signing," President Yanukovych stated in a televised interview. The same day Russian president Vladimir Putin called for an end to the criticism of the Ukrainian decision to delay the association agreement, and that the EU deal was bad for Russia's security interests. Putin was responding to statements by the president of the European Council, Herman Van Rompuy, and the president of the European Commission, José Manuel Barroso, that had stated they "strongly disapproved" of Russia's actions. On 26 November 2013 Prime Minister Azarov stated during a government meeting "I affirm with full authority that the negotiating process over the Association Agreement is continuing, and the work on moving our country closer to European standards is not stopping for a single day". President Yanukovych still attended the 28–29 November EU summit in Vilnius but the Association Agreement was not signed. During this summit, the European Union and Ukraine initialed an Air Services Agreement. Also during the summit, President Yanukovych stated that Ukraine still wanted to sign the Association Agreement but that it needed substantial financial aid to compensate it for the threatened response from Russia, and he proposed starting three-way talks between Russia, Ukraine, and the EU. He also urged Brussels to help Ukraine soften the terms of a possible loan from the IMF. The EU rejected trilateral talks and asked Yanukovich to commit to sign the Association Agreement, which he refused to do. At the end of the summit President of the European Commission José Manuel Barroso stated that the EU will not tolerate "a veto of a third country" in their negotiations on closer integration with Ukraine. He also stated "We are embarked on a long journey, helping Ukraine to become, as others, what we call now, 'new member states'. But we have to set aside short-term political calculations."

The president of the European Council, Herman Van Rompuy, added that "we may not give in to external pressure, least of all from Russia". Barroso reiterated that the EU's offer to Ukraine in terms of signing an Association Agreement remained on the table. (Note: German chancellor Angela Merkel stated during the summit of Ukraine signing their Association Agreement, "I don't have any hope that it will happen this time but the door is open", and that "the Ukrainian president has decided that he does not want this. The door to Europe remains open. We must continue to work. A difficult path is to be walked".) Simultaneously, President Yanukovych stated that he still intends to sign the Association Agreement at a later date "once we get down to work and find solutions for economic problems, when we get the opportunity to sign a strategic partnership agreement with Russia and everything else that we need to do, so that normal relations can be established between the European Union, Russia, and Ukraine… this is our responsibility".

=== Signing ===
President Viktor Yanukovych was removed from power by Ukrainian parliament majority vote after the 2014 Ukrainian revolution and replaced by a new interim government in February 2014. At an EU summit in Brussels on 21 March 2014, the new Ukrainian prime minister, Arseniy Yatseniuk, and European Union leaders Herman Van Rompuy and José Manuel Barroso, along with the 28 national political leaders or heads of state on the European Council, signed in Brussels the political provisions of the AA, with the DCFTA to be signed after the presidential election in May 2014. The European Union and the (then) new Ukrainian president Petro Poroshenko signed the economic part of the Ukraine–European Union Association Agreement on 27 June 2014, and described this as Ukraine's "first but most decisive step" towards EU membership. President of the European Council, Herman Van Rompuy, said at the signing ceremony: "In Kyiv and elsewhere, people gave their lives for this closer link to the European Union. We will not forget this."

== Ratification ==
Titles III, V, VI and VII, and the related Annexes and Protocols of the Agreement have been provisionally applied since 1 November 2014, while Title IV has been applied from 1 January 2016, as far as the provisions concern EU competences. Provisions formally came into force on 1 September 2017 following ratification of the Agreement by all signatories.

Signatory	Date	Institution	In favour	Against	AB	Deposited	Reference
Austria	8 July 2015	National Council	134	47	0	6 August 2015	
Austria	24 July 2015	Federal Council	Approved			6 August 2015	
Austria	31 July 2015	Presidential Assent	Granted			6 August 2015	
Belgium
Belgium	23 April 2015	Chamber of Representatives	102	17	19	1 February 2016	
Belgium	13 May 2015	Royal Assent (federal law)	Granted			1 February 2016	
Belgium	1 July 2015	Walloon; Parliament / (regional) (community) (Note: Concerning issues within the competence of the French Community, delegated to the Walloon Region)	63	2	4	1 February 2016	
Belgium	1 July 2015	Walloon; Parliament / (regional) (community)	61	2	4	1 February 2016	
Belgium	22 June 2015	German-speaking Community	16	2	1	1 February 2016	
Belgium	24 June 2015	French Community	71	0	8	1 February 2016	
Belgium	20 November 2015	Brussels Regional Parliament	69	3	3	1 February 2016	
Belgium	20 November 2015	Brussels United; Assembly (Note: Approval of the Brussels United Assembly is subject to an absolute majority of both language groups of the parliament (French and Dutch) voting in favour. Failing that, a second vote can be held where only one third of each language group, and a majority of the full house, is required for adoption.) / (FR language) (NL language)	53	3	1	1 February 2016	
Belgium	20 November 2015	Brussels United; Assembly / (FR language) (NL language)	14	0	2	1 February 2016	
Belgium	17 June 2015	Flemish; Parliament / (regional) (community)	82	18		1 February 2016	
Belgium	17 June 2015	Flemish; Parliament / (regional) (community)	87	19		1 February 2016	
Belgium	24 June 2015	COCOF Assembly	71	0	8	1 February 2016	
Bulgaria	24 July 2014	National Assembly	90	2	1	9 September 2014	
Bulgaria	28 July 2014	Presidential Assent	Granted			9 September 2014	
Croatia	12 December 2014	Parliament	118	0	0	24 March 2015	
Croatia	18 December 2014	Presidential Assent	Granted			24 March 2015	
Cyprus	29 October 2015	House of Representatives	Approved			29 January 2016	
Cyprus	6 November 2015	Presidential Assent	Granted			29 January 2016	
Czech Republic	10 December 2014	Senate	52	3	12	12 November 2015	
Czech Republic	17 September 2015	Chamber of Deputies	107	29	2	12 November 2015	
Czech Republic	27 October 2015	Presidential Assent	Granted			12 November 2015	
Denmark	18 December 2014	Parliament	102	8	0	18 February 2015	
Estonia	4 November 2014	Assembly	65	1	0	12 January 2015	
Estonia	13 November 2014	Presidential Assent	Granted			12 January 2015	
European Union and EAEC	16 September 2014	European Parliament	535	127	35	11 July 2017	
European Union and EAEC	11 July 2017	Council of the European Union	Granted			11 July 2017	
Finland	10 March 2015	Parliament	Approved			6 May 2015	
Finland	24 April 2015	Presidential Assent	Granted			6 May 2015	
France	7 May 2015	Senate	Approved			10 August 2015	
France	25 June 2015	National Assembly	Approved			10 August 2015	
France	8 July 2015	Presidential Assent	Granted			10 August 2015	
Germany	8 May 2015	Bundesrat	69	0	0	22 July 2015	
Germany	26 March 2015	Bundestag	567	64	0	22 July 2015	
Germany	27 May 2015	Presidential Assent	Granted			22 July 2015	
Greece	18 November 2015	Parliament	Approved			6 January 2016	
Greece	24 November 2015	Presidential Promulgation	Granted			6 January 2016	
Hungary	25 November 2014	National Assembly	139	5	0	7 April 2015	
Hungary	5 December 2014	Presidential Assent	Granted			7 April 2015	
(Republic of Ireland) Ireland	27 January 2015	Dáil Éireann	59	19	0	17 April 2015	
Italy	10 September 2015	Senate	145	39	14	11 December 2015	
Italy	11 June 2015	Chamber of Deputies	245	112	31	11 December 2015	
Italy	29 September 2015	Presidential Assent	Granted			11 December 2015	
Latvia	14 July 2014	Parliament	79	0	0	31 July 2014	
Latvia	18 July 2014	Presidential Assent	Granted			31 July 2014	
Lithuania	8 July 2014	Parliament	87	0	1	29 July 2014	
Lithuania	11 July 2014	Presidential Assent	Granted			29 July 2014	
Luxembourg	18 March 2015	Chamber of Deputies	52	2	3	12 May 2015	
Luxembourg	12 April 2015	Grand Ducal Promulgation	Granted			12 May 2015	
Malta	21 August 2014	House of Representatives	Approved			29 August 2014	
Netherlands	7 April 2015	House of Representatives	119	31	0	15 June 2017	
Netherlands	7 July 2015	Senate	55	20	0	15 June 2017	
Netherlands	8 July 2015	Royal promulgation	Granted			15 June 2017	
Netherlands	6 April 2016	Referendum (Note: Consultative referendum, valid if turnout is above 30%: turnout was 32.1%)	38.41%	61.59%	0.8% (Note: Blank; Invalid votes are not taken into account when calculating percentages)	15 June 2017	
Netherlands	23 February 2017	House of Representatives (post-referendum)	89	55		15 June 2017	
Netherlands	30 May 2017	Senate (post-referendum)	50	25		15 June 2017	
Netherlands	31 May 2017	Royal promulgation (post-referendum)	Granted			15 June 2017	
Poland	4 December 2014	Senate	76	0	0	24 March 2015	
Poland	28 November 2014	Sejm	427	1	0	24 March 2015	
Poland	2 March 2015	Presidential Assent	Granted			24 March 2015	
Portugal	20 March 2015	National Assembly	Approved			13 May 2015	
Portugal	23 April 2015	Presidential Assent	Granted			13 May 2015	
Romania	2 July 2014	Chamber of Deputies	293	0	0	14 July 2014	
Romania	3 July 2014	Senate	113	1	1	14 July 2014	
Romania	9 July 2014	Presidential Assent	Granted			14 July 2014	
Slovakia	24 September 2014	National Council	132	0	2	21 October 2014	
Slovakia	16 October 2014	Presidential Assent	Granted			21 October 2014	
Slovenia	13 May 2015	National Assembly	68	3	1	27 July 2015	
Slovenia	21 May 2015	Presidential Assent	Granted			27 July 2015	
Spain	15 April 2015	Senate	Approved			19 May 2015	
Spain	19 February 2015	Congress of Deputies	296	1	12	19 May 2015	
Spain	5 May 2015	Royal Assent	Granted			19 May 2015	
Sweden	26 November 2014	Parliament	250	44	0	9 January 2015	
Ukraine	16 September 2014	Verkhovna Rada	355	0	0	26 September 2014	
Ukraine	16 September 2014	Presidential Assent	Granted			26 September 2014	
United Kingdom	9 March 2015	House of Lords	Approved			8 April 2015	
United Kingdom	23 February 2015	House of Commons	Approved			8 April 2015	
United Kingdom	19 March 2015	Royal Assent	Granted			8 April 2015	

=== Ratification notes ===
Signatories to the agreement / States that deposited instrument of ratification

==== Malta ====
The ratification was performed in accordance with article 4(2)(b) of the Maltese European Union Act, which reads that:

Provided that with regard to treaties and international conventions which Malta may accede to as Member State of the European Union, and treaties and international conventions which Malta is bound to ratify in its own name or on behalf of the European Community by virtue of its membership within the European Union, these shall come into force one month following their being submitted in order to be discussed by the Standing Committee on Foreign and European Affairs.

As the treaty was submitted to the Standing Committee on Foreign and European Affairs on 21 July 2014, the treaty came into force as part of the Maltese legislation on 21 August 2014.

==== Netherlands ====
Following the entry into effect of the Wet Raadgevend Referendum on 1 July 2015, an advisory referendum is to be held for any act (after its approval) that is not explicitly exempted if sufficient requests are filed. On 13 August the Kiesraad announced that 13,490 valid requests had been registered for a preliminary request for a referendum, surpassing the 10,000 threshold required. This triggered the final phase of the referendum request, requiring 300,000 requests between 18 August and 28 September. The Kiesraad announced on 14 October that 472,849 request had been received, 427,939 of which were held to be valid. As the requirement was met, an advisory referendum was held on the law on 6 April 2016. With a turnout of 32.28%, the threshold for a valid referendum was met. 61% of votes were against the Approval Act. As the Act was rejected, the States General has to enact a follow-up law to either repeal the Act or put it into effect after all.

Following the referendum, Prime Minister of the Netherlands Mark Rutte said that ratification would be put on hold during negotiations with the other parties to the treaty to find a compromise. In December 2016, a decision of the heads of state or government of the EU member states was approved which made legally binding interpretations of the agreement to address the concerns raised in the referendum. In particular, it stated that it did not commit the EU to grant Ukraine EU membership candidate status, or provide security guarantees, military or financial aid, or free movement within the EU. The decision would enter into force if the Netherlands ratified the agreement, which needed to be approved by its parliament. In late January 2017, the Dutch government introduced a bill to confirm approval of the agreement. The Dutch House of Representatives approved the bill on 23 February 2017. The Senate approved the bill on 30 May 2017.

==== United Kingdom of Great Britain and Northern Ireland ====
The ratification was based on The European Union (Definition of Treaties) (Association Agreement) (Ukraine) Order 2015, made in accordance with section 1(3) of the European Communities Act 1972, after having been approved by a resolution of each House of Parliament.

== Implementation and consequences ==
Before the final signing of the agreement on 27 June 2014, Russian officials stated Russia could very likely raise tariffs on Ukrainian imports, Russia is Ukraine's single largest export market, accounting for nearly a quarter of Ukraine's international trade. However, after the Russian aggression against Ukraine the EU has become Ukraine's largest trading partner. It is also its main source of Foreign Direct Investment (FDI).

According to BBC News Ukrainian free access to the EU internal market (the world's biggest free trade area) "is supposed to bring a boost in the long term" to the economy of Ukraine. And the fact that Ukraine has agreed in the treaty to implement EU rules and stipulations should improve Ukraine's business climate as a whole "The country will be required to introduce wide-ranging reforms - increasing transparency, reducing corruption and raising the quality of its output". But it warned that "in the short term, this will cause a great deal of pain and disruption".

As of 2016, tariff-free quotas for the export of most agricultural products to the EU were very small.

=== Implementation schedule ===
In trilateral talks in early September 2014, the European Commission, the Government of Ukraine and Russia agreed on deferring the provisional implementation of the agreement until the end of 2015. "We have agreed to postpone the application until December 31 next year," said EU - Trade Commissioner Karel De Gucht on 12 September 2014 in Brussels at the end of talks with Alexey Ulyukaev, the Russian Minister of Economic Affairs, and Pavlo Klimkin, Foreign Minister of Ukraine. According to Interfax, the president of Ukraine Petro Poroshenko had advocated this decision. Pavlo Klimkin stated Ukraine would also benefit from the postponement: "This is a very important decision and we are very grateful to the EU for offering a privileged access to the European market. This allows our companies to prepare for the further liberalization of trade." The approval of the EU countries is still pending. The unilateral trade facilitation - the abolition of import duties in the EU - will remain in force - on the condition of the approval of the EU Council of Ministers. Tariffs on EU products exported into Ukraine persist.

In the background, there are Russia's concerns about negative effects on the Russian economy, should EU-products get into the Russian market through Ukraine. Therefore, the Russian government had announced new tariffs on Ukrainian products if, as planned, the Association Agreement entered into force as planned on 1 November 2014. The damage to the Russian economy by eliminating import tariffs in Ukraine is estimated to amount to 2 billion dollars by the Russian side. On 1 September 2014, Russia had put forward a list of 2370 change requests concerning the consequences for the Russian-Ukrainian trade. The list had been requested by Karel de Gucht on 11 July 2014. According to the German newspaper Süddeutsche Zeitung there was growing belief in Brussels that "the economic ties between Moscow and Kyiv can not be ignored." Before entering into force, "thousands of exceptions are to be agreed on", informs the Süddeutsche Zeitung, referring to sources in Brussels.

=== Accession of Ukraine to the European Union ===
On 28 February 2022, Ukrainian president Volodymyr Zelenskyy officially signed and submitted a letter of application for EU membership in the midst of the ongoing Russian invasion of Ukraine. On 23 June 2022, the European Council granted Ukraine the status of a candidate for accession to the EU, contingent on meeting the seven required reforms.

=== Application in the United Kingdom ===
The agreement applied to the United Kingdom as an EU-member state until Brexit on 31 January 2020. During the transition period that followed Brexit, the agreement until 31 December 2020, the agreement still applied to the UK. The UK and Ukraine signed on 8 October 2020 an agreement replacing the EU-Ukraine Association Agreement between them, named "Ukraine–United Kingdom Political, Free Trade and Strategic Partnership Agreement"

== Reactions ==
=== European Union ===
- European Union: The president of the European Council, Herman Van Rompuy, stated, prior to the signing of the political provisions of the Association Agreement on 21 March 2014, that the agreement shows the EU's "steadfast support for the course the people of Ukraine have courageously pursued" and that the EU "stands ready to help restore macro-economic stability in the country and to remove custom duties on Ukrainian exports to the EU for a while."
- Germany: German chancellor Angela Merkel was one of the European leaders who signed the political provisions of the agreement on 21 March 2014 and stated that the agreement "is a way of assuring the Ukrainian government and the Ukrainian people more comprehensive support."
- United Kingdom: The British prime minister, David Cameron, was one of the European leaders who signed the political provisions of the agreement on 21 March 2014 and stated in a press conference that "Ukrainian success will be one of the most powerful answers to Russian aggression."

=== Russia ===
On 29 July 2013, Russia banned the import of chocolate products made by the Ukrainian company Roshen and asked Belarus and Kazakhstan to follow suit. A Russian sanitary official stated that the company had not met quality and safety standards, but critics alleged that the ban was meant as a warning against Ukraine associating more closely with the EU. At the time, the owner of Roshen (and future president of Ukraine), Petro Poroshenko, was seen as pro-European. On 14 August 2013, Federal Customs Service of Russia officials began conducting more stringent inspections of cargo arriving from Ukraine than would normally be carried out. This lasted until 20 August 2013 and was followed by statements from the Russian president's top economic advisor Sergey Glazyev arguing that the impact of Russia's response to Ukraine signing the agreement, including tariffs and trade checks, could lead to default, a decline in the standard of living and "political and social unrest" in Ukraine, and would violate the Russian-Ukrainian strategic partnership and friendship treaty. The latter, he warned, would mean that Ukraine's statehood could not be guaranteed by Russia, which might intervene in the country at the request of pro-Russian regions.

Russian president Vladimir Putin warned that members of the Customs Union of Belarus, Kazakhstan and Russia may impose what he called protective measures in the event of trade liberalization between Ukraine and the EU. (Note: The president of Belarus, Alexander Lukashenko, stated on 7 October 2013 that he "didn't see any problems" in the signing of the Association Agreement between Ukraine and the EU.) The EU condemned Russia's threats, calling them unacceptable. Ukrainian prime minister Mykola Azarov urged Russia "to accept the reality of Ukraine signing the EU agreement" and condemned any artificial barriers as pointless.

Ukrainian president Viktor Yanukovich reaffirmed his commitment to the agreement during his annual Independence Day of Ukraine speech on 24 August, and called it an incentive for Ukraine to become a modern European state. In the same speech, he also called for the preservation and deepening of ties with "...Russia, countries of the Eurasian community, other world leaders and new centers of economic development." Ukrainian pro-European opposition politicians commented that Russian actions were consistent with a leaked document outlining a Russian Government strategy to enlarge the Customs Union of Belarus, Kazakhstan and Russia to Ukraine and to prevent its further association with Euro-Atlantic structures. Among other things, the 14-page document lists efforts to promote pro-Russian rhetoric in the media dominated by anti-Russian opinions, sanctioning pro-European Ukrainian business owners, TV magnates and politicians, efforts to elect pro-Russian Viktor Medvedchuk as president in 2015 and a subsequent purge of pro-European civil servants. The paper also mentions cooperation with Belarus and Kazakhstan in this regard. Experts commenting on the "leaked document" argued that Medvedchuk had no chance of winning the 2015 Presidential election and could not seriously disrupt the signing of the Association Agreement.

On 19 September 2013, President Putin stated that Russia would impose "protectionist measures" against Ukraine once the EU Association Agreement was implemented. The next day Aleksei Pushkov, chairman of the State Duma (Russia's main parliament) committee on international affairs commented that Ukraine was entering into an EU "semi-colonial dependence". On 8 October 2013, President Putin stated the free trade agreement "may create certain problems for trade and cooperation. Certain damage may be done to the economic sphere but we will not have any problems in the political field, I am certain".

After the economic part of the Ukraine–European Union Association Agreement was signed on 27 June 2014 (by the new president Petro Poroshenko), Russian president Vladimir Putin stated that making Ukraine choose between Russia and the EU would split the country in two.

=== Other countries ===
- Canada: Minister of Foreign Affairs John Baird announced the signing of the agreement's political provisions is "a historic milestone on Ukraine's path toward a European future" and that Canada welcomes the news.

== See also ==
- Ukraine–European Union relations
- Accession of Ukraine to the European Union
- Moldova–European Union Association Agreement
- Georgia–European Union Association Agreement
- Armenia–European Union Association Agreement
- Ukraine–United Kingdom Political, Free Trade and Strategic Partnership Agreement
