= British–Polish–Ukrainian trilateral pact =

2022 military agreement

British–Polish–Ukrainian Trilateral Pact
- British-Polish-Ukrainian Trilateral countries NATO countries
- Official languages: English; Polish; Ukrainian
- Membership: Poland; Ukraine; United Kingdom
- Establishment: 17 February 2022

Area
  - Total: 1,158,739 km^{2} (447,392 sq mi)

Population
  - Estimate: ▲146,580,638 (excluding Crimea and Sevastopol)

The British–Polish–Ukrainian trilateral pact (Polish: Trójstronny pakt brytyjsko-polsko-ukraiński, Ukrainian: Британсько-польсько-український тристоронній пакт) is an agreement between Poland, Ukraine and the United Kingdom announced in Kyiv on 17 February 2022 by Dmytro Kuleba, then Minister of Foreign Affairs for Ukraine, and Liz Truss, Foreign Secretary for the United Kingdom. The pact serves to improve cyber security, increase energy security, and counter disinformation. The creation of the new London-Warsaw-Kyiv axis took place against the background of Russian military buildup before the 2022 invasion of Ukraine and the active supply of weapons by the United Kingdom and Poland to Ukraine.

Cooperation between the three countries was originally initiated by Ukraine in October 2021. The formation of an alliance was revealed on 1 February 2022. The announcement of the security pact was originally scheduled for 2 February, but it was delayed until 17 February.

This unnamed pact is a part of Ukraine's broader strategy to form small alliances: the Lublin Triangle (Ukraine–Poland–Lithuania), the Association Trio (Ukraine–Georgia–Moldova), and the Quadriga (Ukraine–Turkey).

== History ==
=== Negotiations and early disclosures ===
On 18 January 2022, the Polish Ministry of Foreign Affairs posted a message on Twitter, saying that the foreign ministers of Poland, Ukraine and the United Kingdom had discussed the prospect of trilateral cooperation.

On 21 January the British Foreign Secretary Liz Truss announced "new trilateral ties with Poland and Ukraine" at a speech at the Lowy Institute in Australia. It is considered that this format was discussed during the visit of President Volodymyr Zelenskyy to London the previous December.

According to BBC News Ukraine, the parties finalized the details of the agreement in late January 2022. It was originally planned that the agreement would be announced on 31 January, during a visit to Ukraine by Liz Truss. The announcement was however delayed because Liz Truss contracted COVID-19.

On 1 February, Boris Johnson and Mateusz Morawiecki arrived in Kyiv, where they met with Ukrainian Foreign Minister Dmytro Kuleba. On the same day, during his speech in the Verkhovna Rada of Ukraine, President of Ukraine Volodymyr Zelenskyy announced the creation of a new format of political cooperation in Europe — between Poland, Ukraine and the United Kingdom. At the same time, Foreign Minister Dmytro Kuleba revealed some additional details, stressing the importance of this pact for his country:

We cannot expect safety and prosperity somewhere in the future when we become members of the EU and NATO. We need them today.

— Dmytro Kuleba

The Prime Minister of Poland Mateusz Morawiecki stated at a briefing with the Prime Minister of Ukraine Denys Shmyhal on 1 February 2022, that the new political format between Ukraine, Poland and the United Kingdom will be cooperation to fight for security in the region. According to him, the format of political cooperation created by the Ministries of Foreign Affairs of the three countries is very important:

"The main value is, of course, security in the region. Thanks to security, economic life, trade, and culture can develop. So, we are all interested in this, and such cooperation is a struggle for security in the region."

— Mateusz Morawiecki

"We have seen the destabilisation on the eastern flank of NATO. Britain itself has seen for itself what the long arms of the Russian Federation and their secret services are. Our ministers are working for this format."

— Mateusz Morawiecki

Ministress for Reintegration of the Temporarily Occupied Territories of Ukraine Iryna Vereshchuk believes that the alliance of Ukraine, Poland and the United Kingdom can become an important format in combating Russian aggression:

"I am very optimistic about this, because I understand how important such formats are today. Both [Prime Minister of the United Kingdom Boris] Johnson and Mr. [Polish Prime Minister Mateusz] Morawiecki (we will meet with them today) are doing what the leaders of the free world should be doing - uniting and helping Ukraine to face the threat of the Russian Federation, realising that this is a common challenge and a shared responsibility. I'm not saying it's NATO for three, but I'm saying that this alliance can have a good effect, both militarily and politically"

— Iryna Vereshchuk

During a joint press conference with Boris Johnson, Volodymyr Zelenskyy stated that work on creating a pact between Ukraine, Poland and the United Kingdom had already begun. Zelenskyy added that he would be able to tell more about the union after the beginning of his work at the level of leaders, also saying he believed that it is a good platform for security and trade.

=== Announcement ===
On 17 February 2022, in Kyiv, the Minister of Foreign Affairs for Ukraine Dmytro Kuleba and the Foreign Secretary for the United Kingdom Liz Truss officially announced the pact between Poland, Ukraine and the United Kingdom. According to Dmytro Kuleba, the alliance will focus on economic, trade and energy cooperation, as well as the fight against misinformation. They plan to pay special attention to supporting the Crimean Platform.

Today we are honoured and pleased to announce the launch of a new tripartite format of cooperation between Ukraine, the United Kingdom and Poland. Unfortunately, for logistical reasons, the three of us cannot do this, and Zbigniew Rau, our Polish colleague, should be standing here (Polish Foreign Minister - ed.), But he is with us remotely and we are announcing the launch of this tripartite Ukrainian-Polish-British format.

— Dmytro Kuleba

Liz Truss, in turn, said that the purpose of her visit was to express support for Ukraine from the United Kingdom, pointing to the assistance that London is already providing to Ukraine, including defence weapons, the training of 22,000 Ukrainian servicemen and 88 million pounds of aid aimed at Ukraine's energy independence:

I am very impressed that, despite Russia's aggression against Ukraine, life here in Kyiv continues. I am impressed by the stoicism of the Ukrainian people. Today I want to announce the next component of our support - to increase the level of support for these projects to 100 million pounds. I am also glad that today we are launching a tripartite partnership with Ukraine and Poland.

— Liz Truss

== Analysts' views ==
Ambassador of Ukraine to the United Kingdom, Vadym Prystaiko, in an interview with BBC News Ukraine said that the proposed pact was "not exactly NATO for three. It is actually an attempt to find friends, partners, and assistance in this critical moment." According to Prystaiko, "Ukraine has to rely on NATO members ready to help now". He reminded that the partnership between the UK and Ukraine was growing stronger: the countries already signed the Political, Free Trade and Strategic Partnership Agreement; the UK would provide almost GBP $2 billion to Ukraine; the UK already supplied anti-tank weapons and helped the construction of ships and naval bases. Prystaiko explains Britain's motives as follows:

"The interest is part of UK's Global Britain concept developed post-Brexit. The UK needs a friend like Ukraine. Similarly, relations between Poland and the UK matter. In the eyes of British people, Ukraine is a strong state on the other side of the European continent"

— Vadym Prystaiko

Expert Oleksandr Kraiev emphasised that such an alliance is part of Britain's strategy to restore influence in the world and the region after Brexit. "Of course, these are Britain's political ambitions," he said. In addition, three countries are actively opposing the Russian threat. On the other hand, Krayev said, the three countries "have questions" and some claims to Brussels - that is, to the EU. In NATO, not all countries are ready to resolutely oppose the Russian threat, so Britain continues the tactics of small alliances to work more effectively in Eastern Europe:

"The trilateral partnership can become a new 'Little Entente', a grouping created by a number of Central and Eastern European countries in the early 20th century that shared the goals of the Triple Entente"

— Oleksandr Kraiev

Serhii Herasymchuk, deputy director of the Ukrainian Prism Foreign Policy Council, explained how Poland benefits from the alliance:

"This puts them on a par with the British, strengthens them within the European Union and demonstrates that Poland is engaging Britain in security tasks of EU interest. They need Ukraine so that there is no big border with Russia if it is occupied or Kyiv embraces Russia. In general, in this alliance, Poles indirectly represent the EU, which is also becoming a security actor in some way"

— Serhii Herasymchuk

He recalled that, in recent years, Warsaw has had conflicts with Brussels. And the recent resolution of the Russian-inspired conflict with migrants and aiding the escalation in Ukraine will be Poland's additional arguments in the debate with the EU leadership. According to experts, the involvement of London in the regional alliance is only the first step towards strengthening Britain in the region. And Ukraine should benefit greatly from this and help reduce the threat from Moscow.

== Popular opinion ==
=== Ukraine ===
According to a poll conducted by the Ukrainian sociological company Rating from 21 to 23 January 2022, Ukrainians were positive about the idea of a "Triple Alliance": 61 percent of respondents agreed with an alliance, with 21 percent against, while 12% of Ukrainians said they did not care, and 6% could not answer. Regionally, the idea of creating such an association is most supported by residents of the western and central regions, as well as Kyiv (support level from 65% to 76%). Residents of the southern regions (51% support, 31% do not support) and the eastern regions (40% support, 38% do not support) have a slightly worse attitude to this initiative. Among the supporters of political parties, outspoken opponents of such an initiative are supporters of the "Opposition Platform — For Life" (62% do not support), "Party of Shariy" (67%) and Nashi (68%). Among the voters of other parties, the number of those who support such an initiative far exceeds the number of its opponents. The greatest support for the idea of creating a military-political union of Poland, Ukraine and the United Kingdom is enjoyed by voters of the parties "European Solidarity", "Freedom" and "Strength and Honour", with all having an approval of over 80%.

== See also ==
- Intermarium
- Lublin Triangle
- Visegrád Group
- Three Seas Initiative
