= Lithuanian Presidency of the Council of the European Union =

The logo of the Lithuanian Presidency of the Council of the European Union 2013

Lithuania held the Presidency of the Council of the European Union during the second half of 2013 (July-December), and is scheduled to hold the presidency again in the first half of 2027 (January-June). Lithuania was the first of the three Baltic states to hold the Presidency since they joined the European Union in the spring of 2004.

== Priorities ==
On November 10, 2011, the Parliament of the Republic of Lithuania (the Seimas) agreed a list of possible priority areas for the Lithuanian Presidency:

- Finalization of the Multiannual Financial Framework regulations, further initiatives and actions for economic governance, financial stability and the agenda for growth;
- Energy security by implementing consolidation of energy infrastructure and strengthening the position of the EU’s common external energy policy;
- Effective support for the European Union Baltic Sea region strategy through regional co-operation;
- Increasing the involvement of the Eastern Partnership countries at the EU level through reforms and the implementation of common planned agreements with the EU;
- Effective protection of the EU borders by integrated management and intensified efforts to fight combat smuggling and fraud.

== Coordination ==
Preparations for the Lithuanian Presidency of the EU Council in 2013 were coordinated by the Ministry of Foreign Affairs of the Republic of Lithuania. A special EU Council Presidency department was designated for this task. Other ministries and governmental institutions were directly involved in the preparation process and participated in the Presidency coordination network.

== Events ==
The Ministry of Foreign Affairs of the Republic of Lithuania confirmed plans to host approximately 200 Presidency events in the capital, Vilnius. The main highlights include such events like the high-level Eastern Partnership summit and the ICT 2013 conference and exhibition.

== Criticism ==
Lithuania was criticised for the number of contract awards the country placed for activities and supplies related to the presidency which had not been let via competitive processes in accordance with government procurement legislation: over 60% of contracts were awarded without advertising. Examples included the contract for travel services for the expected visitors attending the events marking the presidency. The need to place "dozens of contracts" quickly was highlighted as a reason for the award of no-bid contracts. Critics also raised concerns that the events were all held in Vilnius, excluding Kaunas, the second-largest city, and other parts of the country.
