= Ukraine–United Kingdom Political, Free Trade and Strategic Partnership Agreement =

Free trade agreement signed in 2021

Political, Free Trade and Strategic Partnership Agreement between the United Kingdom of Great Britain and Northern Ireland and Ukraine
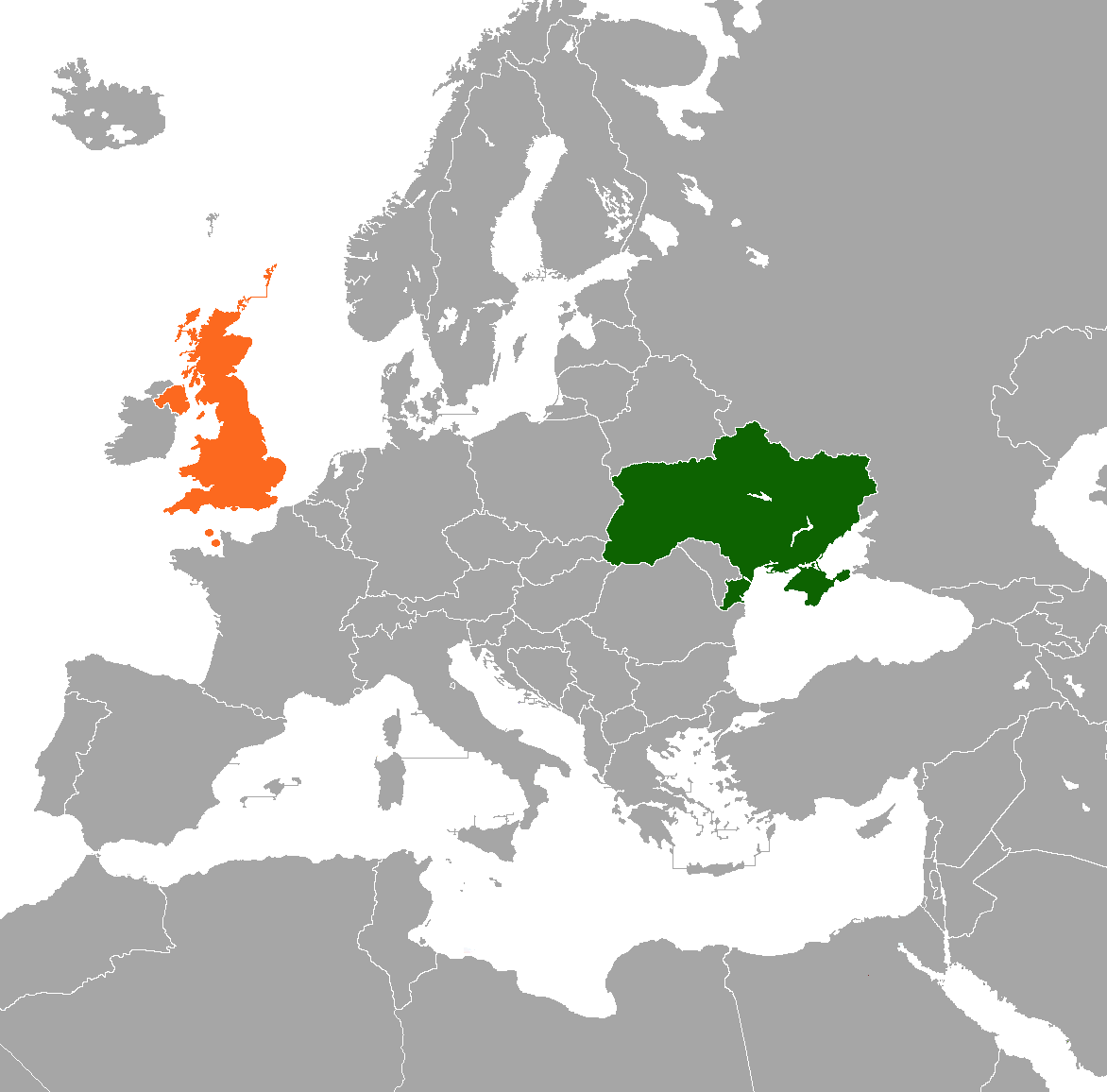
- Ukraine United Kingdom
- Type: Free Trade Agreement and Economic Integration Agreement
- Context: Trade Continuity Agreement between Ukraine and the United Kingdom
- Signed: 8 October 2020
- Location: London, England, United Kingdom
- Effective: 1 January 2021
- Negotiators: Volodymyr Zelenskyy; Boris Johnson
- Parties: Ukraine; United Kingdom
- Languages: English; Ukrainian

The Ukraine–United Kingdom Political, Free Trade and Strategic Partnership Agreement is a free trade agreement between Ukraine and the United Kingdom. The agreement is a trade continuity agreement that governs trade and broader cooperation in political, security, and cultural fields between Ukraine and the United Kingdom following the UK's withdrawal from the European Union.

Negotiations for this agreement were driven by the need to replace the arrangements previously covered by the European Union–Ukraine Association Agreement, which ceased to apply to the UK after Brexit. The new agreement closely replicates the effects of the EU-Ukraine deal, preserving preferential trade conditions and establishing a free trade area for goods, while also providing a platform for further trade liberalisation and cooperation in areas such as investment, intellectual property, and public procurement. The text of the trade part of the agreement is largely based on the provisions of the Association Agreement, adapted to the specifics of the Ukraine–UK relationship. Negotiations were aimed at replicating and expanding the cooperative provisions for trade, political dialogue, and strategic partnership. The agreement was formally signed in London on 8 October 2020 by officials from both countries. Ukraine's parliament ratified the agreement on 22 August 2023, ensuring full legal validity and the start of trade liberalisation.

== History ==
From 23 April 2014 until 30 December 2020, trade between Ukraine and the UK was governed by the European Union–Ukraine Association Agreement, while the United Kingdom was a member of the European Union.

Following the withdrawal of the United Kingdom from the European Union, Ukraine and the UK signed the Ukraine–United Kingdom Political, Free Trade and Strategic Partnership Agreement on 8 October 2020. The Political, Free Trade and Strategic Partnership Agreement is a continuity trade agreement, based on the EU free trade agreement, which entered into force on 20 May 2021.

== Agreement ==
The agreement establishes a strategic partnership aimed at developing political and economic cooperation built upon common values such as democracy, rule of law, human rights, and respect for sovereignty and international law. Its principal objectives include the promotion of economic and political stability, security, and prosperity in the region, support for Ukrainian sovereignty and territorial integrity, and cooperation in response to regional and global challenges, notably Russian aggression and related geopolitical issues.

=== Political and Strategic Partnership ===
The treaty creates an annual Strategic Partnership Dialogue, providing a formal structure for high-level discussions on bilateral, international, and security issues. The United Kingdom and Ukraine commit to:

- Supporting democratic institutions and reforms in Ukraine.
- Advocating for Ukraine’s territorial integrity, including non-recognition of Russia’s annexation of the Autonomous Republic of Crimea.
- Coordinating efforts for post-conflict recovery in areas affected by Russian aggression, especially in the Donbas region.
- Bilateral defence engagement, including military assistance, development of joint defence capability projects, and coordination in crisis response mechanisms.

The partnership also encompasses joint efforts in foreign policy, including alignment on United Nations and European security architecture, and facilitating Ukraine’s ambitions for further integration with NATO and the European Union.

=== Trade and Economic Provisions ===
The agreement establishes a Free Trade Area, gradually removing tariffs and quotas on goods traded between the two countries. Following ratification in August 2023, the agreement enabled full trade liberalisation for a five-year period, until 31 March 2029, with the exception of certain agricultural goods such as eggs and poultry, which received an extension until 1 April 2026. Key Ukrainian exports benefiting from the agreement include grain, flour, dairy, poultry, tomato paste, honey, corn, wheat, juices, and sugar.

== Digital Trade Agreement ==
Ukraine–United Kingdom Digital Trade Agreement
Digital Trade Agreement between the United Kingdom of Great Britain and Northern Ireland and Ukraine
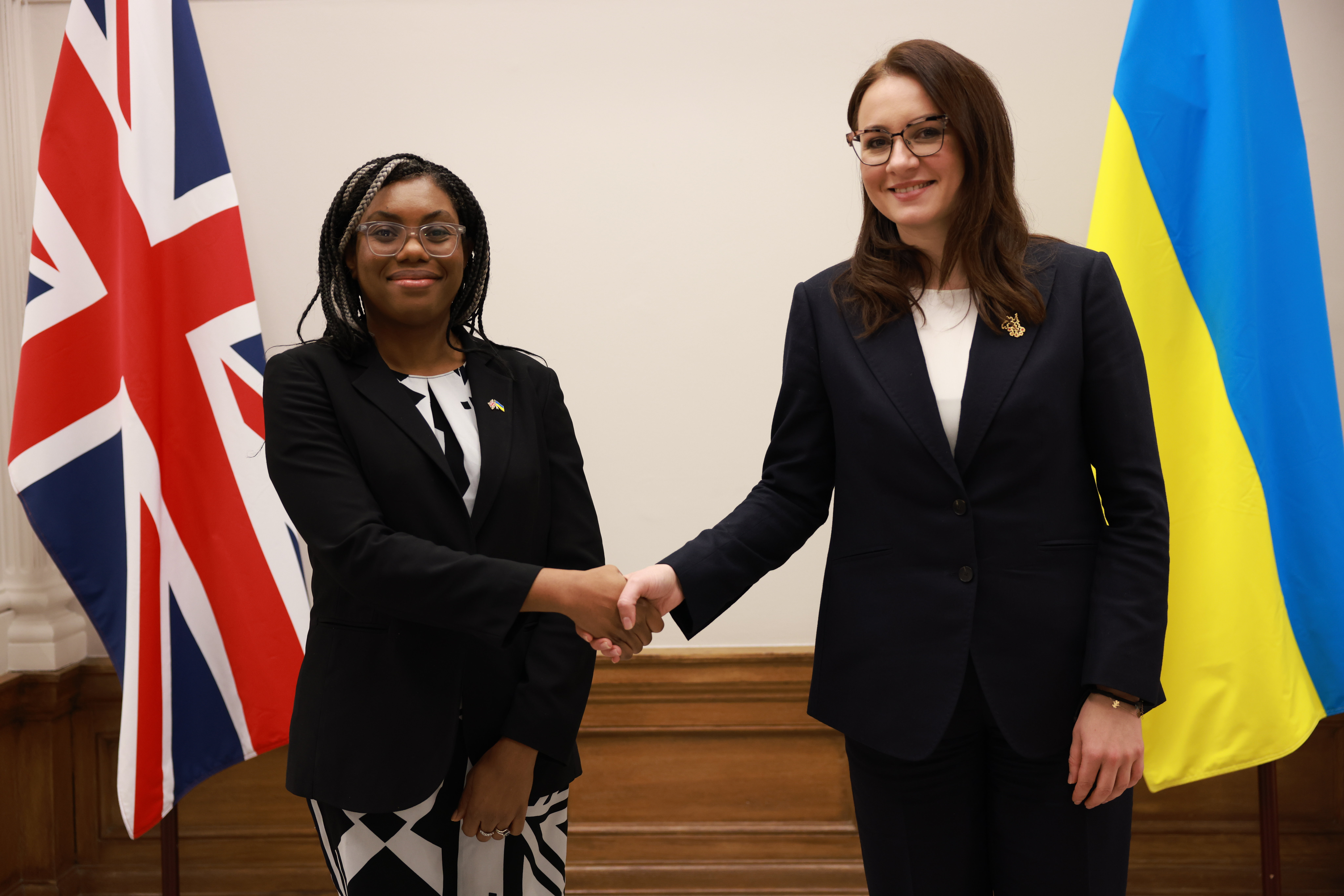
- Ukraine United Kingdom
- Context: The DTA forms an annex/amendment to the broader agreement, updating and expanding the provisions related to digital trade and services.
- Drafted: 20 November 2022
- Signed: 20 March 2023
- Location: London, England, United Kingdom
- Effective: 1 September 2024
- Condition: The DTA entered into force after both countries completed their domestic legal procedures.
- Negotiators: Yulia Svyrydenko; Kemi Badenoch
- Parties: Ukraine; United Kingdom
- Languages: English; Ukrainian

Ukraine and the United Kingdom signed a Digital Trade Agreement on 20 March 2023, the agreement expands the Political, Free Trade and Strategic Partnership Agreement to cover digital trade. The Ukraine–United Kingdom Digital Trade Agreement entered into force on 1 September 2024.

The parties extended the Political, Free Trade and Strategic Partnership Agreement’s trade-related provisions through the Digital Trade Agreement, focusing on open digital markets, regulatory standards, and cybersecurityi collaboration. This addition facilitates trade in digital services, improves consumer protections, and addresses the challenges of traditional trade exacerbated by the ongoing conflict in Ukraine.

== See also ==
- Economy of Ukraine
- Economy of the United Kingdom
- European Union–Ukraine Association Agreement
- Free trade agreements of the European Union
- Free trade agreements of the United Kingdom
- Foreign relations of Ukraine
- Foreign relations of the United Kingdom
- Ukraine–United Kingdom relations
