= Mission of Ukraine to the European Union =

Diplomatic mission of Ukraine to the European Union

Mission of Ukraine to the EU
- Location: (Belgium) Brussels
- Address: European Union 99-101, avenue Louis Lepoutre, 1050, Brussels, Belgium
- Coordinates: 50°49′05″N 4°21′19″E
- Ambassador: Mykola Tochytskyi since 2016
- Website: Official Website

The Diplomatic mission of Ukraine to the European Union is the diplomatic mission of Ukraine to the European Union and European Atomic Energy Community; it is based in Brussels, Belgium.

== History ==
Diplomatic relations between the EU and Ukraine were established in December 1991. Next year Ukraine designated its first representative to the EU - Ambassador Volodymyr Vasylenko.

The fully-fledged Mission of Ukraine to the European Union was established in Brussels in 1996.

== Heads of the Mission ==
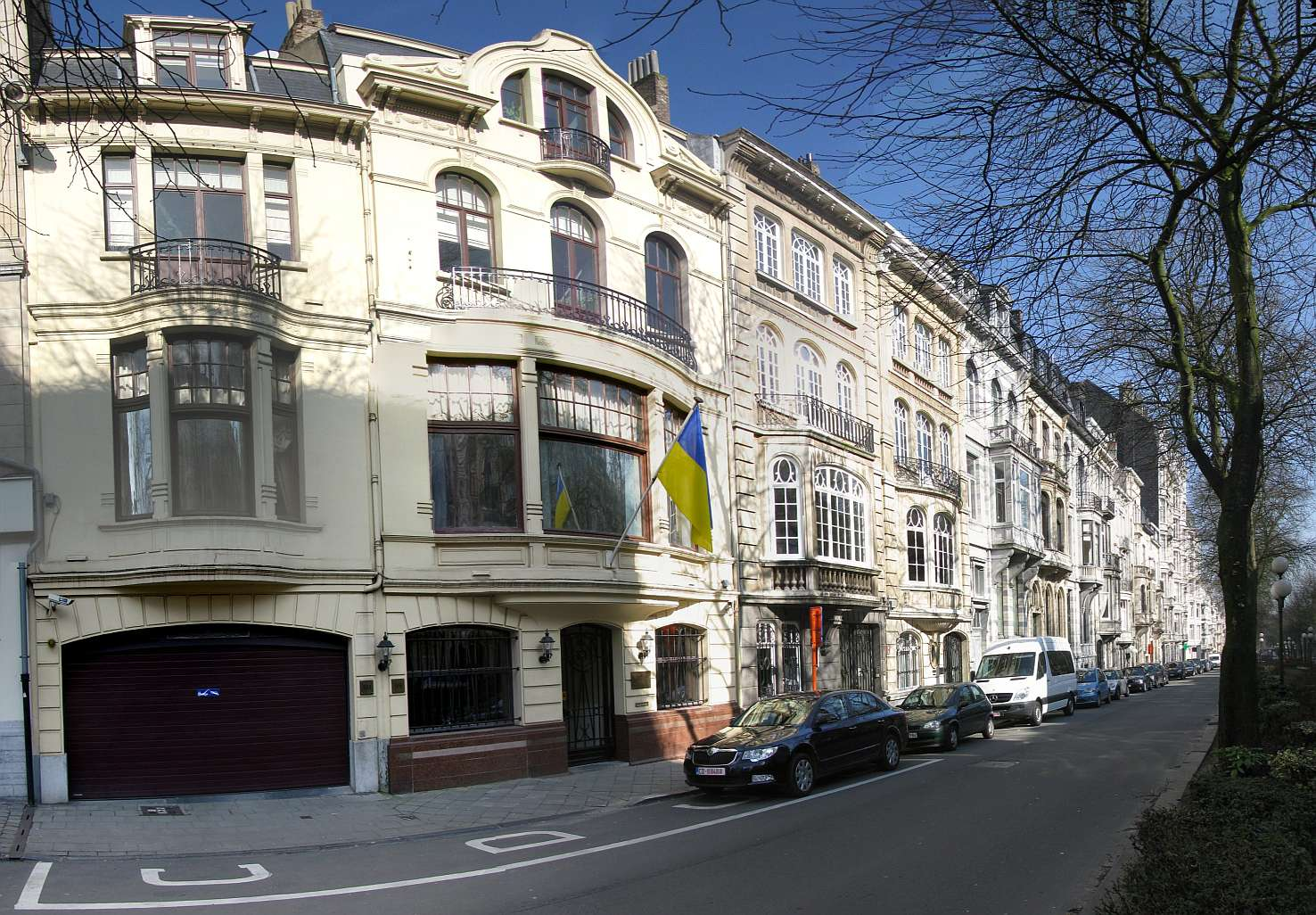
Mission of Ukraine at Avenue Louis Lepoutre/Louis Lepoutrelaan 99–101 in Brussels

- Volodymyr Vasylenko (1996–1998), Ukrainian diplomat. Ambassador Extraordinary and Plenipotentiary of Ukraine;
- Ihor Mityukov (1996–1998), former Deputy Prime-Minister of Ukraine;
- Borys Hudyma (1998–2000), career diplomat, former Deputy Minister of Foreign Affairs responsible for the relations with the European Union institutions;
- Roman Shpek (2000–2008), former Deputy Prime Minister and Head of the National Agency for Development and European integration;
- Andriy Veselovsky (2008–May 2010), career diplomat, former Deputy Minister of Foreign Affairs responsible for the relations with the European Union institutions;
- Kostiantyn Yelisieiev (July 2010-July 2015), career diplomat, former Deputy Minister of Foreign Affairs responsible for the relations with the European Union institutions;
- Mykola Tochytskyi (2016–2021), Ukrainian diplomat. Ambassador Extraordinary and Plenipotentiary of Ukraine to the Kingdom of Belgium and to the Grand Duchy of Luxembourg.
- Vsevolod Chentsov (2021–present)

== Comparison ==
	European Union	Ukraine
Population	447,206,135	42,539,010
Area	4,232,147 km^{2} (1,634,041 sq mi)	603,500 km² (6,592,800 sq mi)
Population Density	115/km² (300 /sq mi)	73.8/km^{2} (191/sq mi)
Capital	Brussels (de facto)	Kyiv
Global Cities	Paris, Rome, Berlin, Warsaw, Vienna, Madrid, Amsterdam, Lisbon, Stockholm, Prague, Helsinki, Athens etc.	Kyiv
Government	Supranational parliamentary democracy based on the European treaties	Unitary semi-presidential constitutional republic
First Leader	High Authority President Jean Monnet	President Leonid Kravchuk
Current Leader	Council President Charles Michel; Commission President Ursula von der Leyen	President Volodymyr Zelenskyy; Prime Minister Denys Shmyhal
Official languages	Languages of the EU	Ukrainian
GDP (nominal)	$16.033 trillion ($35,851 per capita)	$122.875 billion ($2915.484 per capita)
GDP (PPP)	$20.366 trillion ($45,541 per capita)	$426.791 billion ($10126.589 per capita)

== See also ==
- Delegation of the European Union to Ukraine
- Ukraine–European Union relations
- Mykola Tochytskyi
- Foreign relations of Ukraine
