= Potential accession of Ukraine to the European Union =

Ongoing process of Ukraine joining the EU

Process of potential accession of Ukraine to the European Union
- Status: Candidate negotiating (screening complete)
Application
| European perspective | 18 April 2014 |
| Membership application | 28 February 2022 |
| Candidate status | 23 June 2022 |
| Screened & negotiations commence | 30 September 2025 |
Negotiations
| Clusters unopen | 2 |
| Chapters unopen | 9 |
| Clusters open | 4 |
| Chapters open | 24 |
| Clusters closed | 0 |
| Chapters closed | 0 0% complete |
Memberships & Treaties
Association Agreement
Economic and monetary policy
| World Trade Organization (WTO) | Member since 16 May 2008 |
Travel
Energy
Foreign and military policy
| North Atlantic Treaty Organization (NATO) | Partnership for Peace since 8 February 1994; Ukraine applied for membership to NATO on 30 September 2022. Main article: Ukraine–NATO relations |
| Organization for Security and Co-operation in Europe (OSCE) | Member since 30 January 1992 |
Human rights and international courts
| Council of Europe (CoE) | Member since 9 November 1995 |
| International Criminal Court (ICC) | Member since 1 February 2025 |
| International Court of Justice (ICJ) |
Impact (27+1)
| Population | 446,828,803 | 480,261,258 |
| Area | 4,233,262 km^{2} 1,634,472 mi^{2} | 4,717,762 km^{2} 1,867,534 mi^{2} |
| HDI | 0.896 |
| GDP (PPP) | $25.399 trillion |
| GDP per capita (PPP) | $56,928 |
| GDP | $17.818 trillion | $20.477 trillion (Note: as of 2024 IMF estimate) |
| GDP per capita | $39,940 |
| Gini | 30.0 |
| Official Languages | 24 | Ukrainian ▲1 |

The potential accession of Ukraine to the European Union (EU) is on the agenda for future enlargement of the EU.

On 28 February 2022, four days after it was invaded by Russia, Ukraine applied for membership of the European Union (EU). Ukrainian president Volodymyr Zelenskyy requested immediate admission under a "new special procedure", and the presidents of eight EU states called for an accelerated accession process. European Commission president Ursula von der Leyen stated that she supports Ukrainian accession, but that the process would take time. On 10 March 2022, the Council of the European Union asked the commission for its opinion on the application. On 8 April 2022, von der Leyen presented Zelenskyy with a legislative questionnaire, which Ukraine responded to on 9 May.

On 17 June 2022, the European Commission recommended that the European Council grant Ukraine candidate status for accession to the EU. On 23 June 2022, the European Parliament adopted a resolution calling for the immediate granting of candidate status for EU membership to Ukraine. On the same day, the European Council granted Ukraine the status of a candidate for accession to the EU. It is one of nine current EU candidate countries, together with Albania, Bosnia and Herzegovina, Georgia, Moldova, Montenegro, North Macedonia, Serbia, and Turkey.

On 14 December 2023, the European Council decided to open accession negotiations with Ukraine. Accession negotiations officially opened on 25 June 2024, at the same time as those with Moldova. This signified another milestone in this country's ongoing efforts to align more closely with Western nations and diminish Russia's influence. If Ukraine becomes a member of the EU, it will be another former Soviet country after Estonia, Latvia and Lithuania, which all joined the EU in 2004.

In June 2025, Hungary blocked the opening of EU accession talks. Then-Hungarian prime minister Viktor Orbán says it would mean "integrating war" into the European Union. German chancellor Friedrich Merz cast doubt on the possibility of Ukraine joining the European Union by 2034. Russian president Vladimir Putin announced that Russia did not oppose Ukraine's membership in the EU, but opposed its membership in NATO. Nonetheless, a June 2026 report published by the EU and Ukraine found that Russia was carrying out foreign influence operations to erode support for Ukraine's accession into the union.

== Chronology of relations ==
The flag used by activists in the Euromaidan protests

The European Union–Ukraine Association Agreement was signed in 2014 after a series of events that had stalled its ratification culminated in a revolution in Ukraine and overthrow of the then incumbent president of Ukraine, Viktor Yanukovych. The Deep and Comprehensive Free Trade Area with Ukraine came into force on 1 September 2017 after being provisionally applied since 1 January 2016, and the Association Agreement fully came into force on 1 September 2017. On 24 February 2022, Russia invaded Ukraine, leading to the membership application.

Timeline
| Date | Event |
|---|---|
| 1991 | Declaration of the European Union on Ukraine. |
| 1992 | The first Ukraine-EU summit. |
| 1993 | An agreement was signed between the European Communities and Ukraine on trade in textile products, the opening of a representative office of the Commission of the European Communities in Ukraine. |
| 1994 | The Verkhovna Rada of Ukraine ratified the Partnership and Cooperation Agreement between Ukraine and the EU. |
| 1995 | The first meeting of the Joint Committee Ukraine - EU, the establishment of the Representation of Ukraine to the European Communities. |
| 1996 | The European Union has recognized Ukraine's status as a country in transition. The Council of the European Union has adopted an action plan for Ukraine. |
| 1997 | An agreement on trade in steel products was signed between the European Coal and Steel Community and the Government of Ukraine. |
| 1998 | Entry into force of the Partnership and Cooperation Agreement between Ukraine and the EU, Ukraine has officially declared its desire to become an associate member of the EU, adopted a resolution of the Cabinet of Ministers of Ukraine "On the introduction of a mechanism for adapting Ukrainian legislation to European Union." |
| 1999 | The EU has reaffirmed its intention to facilitate Ukraine's accession to the World Trade Organization and the launch of a free trade area between Ukraine and the EU. |
| 2005 | The Council of the European Union has granted Ukraine the status of a market economy country, another summit. |
| 5 March 2007 | Negotiations have begun to conclude a new enhanced agreement to replace the Partnership and Cooperation Agreement. |
| 2008 | Entry into force of visa facilitation and readmission agreements between Ukraine and the EU. |
| 7 May 2009 | Ukraine became a member of the EU's Eastern Partnership initiative |
| 16 June 2009 | During the meeting of the EU-Ukraine Cooperation Council, the "EU-Ukraine Association Agenda" was politically approved. |
| 25 February 2010 | The European Parliament has approved a resolution on the situation in Ukraine, which, in particular, recognizes Ukraine's right to join the European Union. The European Commission is also given a mandate to work on a "road map" for visa-free travel between Ukraine and EU countries. |
| 2013 | A joint statement was adopted at the Brussels summit stating that Ukraine is "determined to comply" with EU conditions so that the parties can sign the Association Agreement and the Free Trade Area. |
| 21 November 2013 | The Cabinet of Ministers of Ukraine has decided to suspend the process of preparation for the signing of the Association Agreement with the European Union, as a result of which mass demonstrations began across the country against the suspension of the European integration process — Euromaidan. On November 24, a mass protest took place in Kyiv, attended by more than a million people. |
| 21 March 2014 | The political part of the European Union–Ukraine Association Agreement was signed in Brussels with the participation of Prime Minister Arsenii Yatseniuk. |
| 27 June 2014 | The fifth president of Ukraine Petro Poroshenko signed the second (economic) part of the Association Agreement with the European Union. |
| 16 September 2014 | The European Parliament ratified the Association Agreement between Ukraine and the European Union simultaneously with the Verkhovna Rada of Ukraine (via a teleconference via Skype). |
| 1 November 2014 | The provisional application of the Association Agreement between Ukraine and the European Union has entered into force. |
| 13 February 2017 | The Verkhovna Rada of Ukraine ratified the Agreement between the Government of Ukraine and the European Union on Ukraine's participation in the COSME program. |
| 13 July 2017 | The Ukraine-EU summit in Kyiv completed the ratification process of the Association Agreement between Ukraine and the European Union and the entry into force of the visa-free regime between Ukraine and the European Union. |
| 9 July 2018 | The 20th anniversary Ukraine-EU Summit took place. |
| 12 October 2021 | An agreement on the Common Aviation Area was signed at the Ukraine-EU summit in Kyiv. |
| 28 February 2022 | The sixth president of Ukraine Volodymyr Zelenskyy signed an application for Ukraine's accession to the European Union under the "accelerated procedure". |
| 1 March 2022 | The European Parliament almost unanimously voted in favor of the resolution, which called on the European Union institutions to work to give Ukraine candidate status for membership in the European Union. |
| 16 March 2022 | NPC Ukrenergo, the system operator of the power grid of Ukraine, together with its European colleagues completed the integration with the Synchronous grid of Continental Europe and became part of ENTSO-E. |
| 25 March 2022 | During the informal summit of the European Union, Member States supported Ukraine's European aspirations and invited the European Commission to provide its conclusions on the application for EU membership. |
| 8 April 2022 | The President of the European Commission handed over a questionnaire to Ukraine to obtain candidate status. |
| 17 April 2022 | Ukraine responded to the first part of the questionnaire. |
| 9 May 2022 | Ukraine responded to the second and final part of the questionnaire. |
| 17 June 2022 | The European Commission recommended granting candidate status to Ukraine. |
| 23 June 2022 | The European Council granted Ukraine the status of a candidate for accession to the European Union. |
| 8 November 2023 | The European Commission recommended opening accession negotiations with Ukraine. |
| 14 December 2023 | The European Council has decided to open accession negotiations with Ukraine. |
| 25 January 2024 | Start of screening |
| 21 June 2024 | The European Union has decided to start membership negotiations with Ukraine. |
| 25 June 2024 | Start of membership negotiations |
| 15 June 2026 | First 5 chapters (Fundamentals Cluster) open in the 2nd Intergovenmental Conference. Substantial negotiations start. |

=== 2002–2005 ===
On 12 January 2002, the European Parliament noted that Ukraine may enter the EU in the future. In 2002, EU Enlargement Commissioner Guenther Verheugen said that "the European perspective for Ukraine does not necessarily mean membership in the next 10-20 years, although it is possible." To join the European Union, the applicant state must meet the political and economic conditions commonly known as the Copenhagen Criteria (adopted at the Copenhagen Summit in 1993), namely a democratic government that recognizes the rule of law and relevant freedoms and institutions. According to the Maastricht Treaty, each current Member State, as well as the European Parliament, must agree on any enlargement.

Obtaining the status of a full member of the EU as a strategic goal of Ukraine was first declared by president of Ukraine Viktor Yushchenko immediately after his election in early 2005. On 13 January 2005, the European Parliament almost unanimously (467 in favor, 19 against) adopted a resolution on the European Parliament's intentions to converge with Ukraine on membership. The European Commission notes that, although a certain preparatory period has yet to pass, the admission of new members is not ruled out, to which President Yushchenko responded with his intention to apply for membership "in the near future."

Several influential EU leaders at the time expressed support for improving ties with Ukraine. In particular, Polish Foreign Minister Adam Rotfeld stated on 21 March 2005 that Poland would support Ukraine's European integration aspirations under any circumstances. In particular, he said: "At this stage, we should focus on concrete steps of cooperation instead of empty talks about pan-European cooperation." Three days later, a survey in the six largest EU countries showed the commitment of EU citizens to accept Ukraine as a full member in the future.

In October 2005, European Commission president Jose Manuel Barroso said that "Ukraine's future is in the EU." However, on 9 October 2005, the European Commission, in a new version of the Development Strategy Paper, stated that the implementation of enlargement plans (Croatia and the former Yugoslav Republics) could block the accession of Ukraine, Belarus and Moldova. Enlargement Commissioner Olli Rehn said the EU should avoid "too much enlargement", stressing that the current enlargement plan looks complete.

Although Ukrainian officials and political scientists mentioned several specific dates for possible membership, only Ukraine's European Neighborhood Policy has been officially proposed to Ukraine by the EU so far. The presidential administration has been critical of the proposed status of neighborhood relations.

=== 2007–2014 ===
In March 2007, Ukraine was offered a Free Trade Agreement with the EU. Although this proposal provoked a much stronger reaction from the Ukrainian state, it did not contain specific plans for Ukraine's accession to the EU in the near future. Some Western European politicians have spoken of the temporary "fatigue of enlargement" of European institutions. Ukrainian observers identify the so-called "resistance group" of Ukraine's accession to the EU. In particular, when concluding the text of the Enhanced Agreement between Ukraine and the EU in March 2007, references to the prospect of membership were excluded from it. "Any mention of the prospect of Ukraine's accession to the European Union has been excluded from the draft enhanced Ukraine-EU agreement due to France's position." wrote the influential German newspaper Frankfurter Allgemeine Zeitung. Italy's position depends on the domestic political situation of this country. Thus, during the election campaign in this country, the government of Silvio Berlusconi gave diplomatic signals that he was ready to support Ukraine's European integration aspirations. His political opponent Romano Prodi, on the other hand, said that "Ukraine's prospects for joining the EU are the same as in New Zealand."

According to the Eastern Partnership policy, Ukraine can become a member of the European Union. On 27 February 2014, the European Parliament passed a resolution that recognized Ukraine's right to "apply to become a Member of the Union, provided that it adheres to the principles of democracy, respects fundamental freedoms and human and minority rights, and ensures the rule of law". The European Parliament notes that in accordance with Article 49 of the Treaty with the EU, Georgia, Moldova and Ukraine, like any other European country, have a European perspective and can apply for EU membership in accordance with the principles of democracy, - said in a resolution of the European Parliament in Brussels, adopted at the last session before the elections to the European Parliament, which took place on 23–25 May 2014. On 27 June 2014, President Jose Manuel Barroso of the European Commission stated that the Association Agreement is the beginning of Ukraine's accession to the EU. On the same day, EU Enlargement Commissioner Stefan Fuele stated that he believed in Ukraine's future membership in the EU.

=== 2014–2025 ===
In March 2016, President of the European Commission Jean-Claude Juncker stated that it would take at least 20–25 years for Ukraine to join the EU and NATO. In June 2018, President of Ukraine Petro Poroshenko said he expects Ukraine will join the European Union and the North Atlantic Treaty Organisation by 2030.

On 21 February 2019, the Constitution of Ukraine was amended to enshrine the norms on the strategic course of Ukraine for membership in the European Union and NATO in the preamble of the Basic Law, three articles and transitional provisions.

At the X session of the Ukraine–Poland–Lithuania Interparliamentary Assembly, which ended on 8 June 2019 in Kyiv, the parties signed a final document containing an agreement on the strategy of 2025 and 2027 as a period for Ukraine's possible accession to the EU. In 2027, when Lithuania will hold the EU presidency for the second time, the issue of Ukraine will be the main issue on the agenda. If this opportunity is not used, the next "window" will open in 2039, when Poland will preside over the EU and Lithuania will preside only in 2041.

On 23 July 2020, Poland, Lithuania and Ukraine created a tripartite platform for political, economic, cultural and social cooperation – the Lublin Triangle, which aims to support Ukraine's integration into the EU and NATO.

In February 2021, the leader of the presiding Christian Democratic Union of Germany, Armin Laschet, who was considered a likely successor to Angela Merkel as Chancellor of Germany, supported the idea of EU enlargement and giving Ukraine a European perspective:

"The question of Ukraine's accession to the EU does not arise at the moment, but it will inevitably arise in the future. We must support Ukraine on its difficult path and at the same time open a European perspective."

Quite a few experts believe that in times of deteriorating relations between Russia and the EU, Ukraine has a window of opportunity to join the European Union. Pavlo Klimkin noted that Ukraine still does not meet any criteria for joining the European Union, as it does not have an established democracy, rule of law and a full-fledged market economy. According to him, the first chance was lost in early 2005, when Yushchenko was persuaded not to apply, and in 2014, it was much more difficult to do so.

On 11 February 2021, the European Parliament published a report on Ukraine's success in implementing the Association Agreement with the European Union. The document highlights both the main successes of Ukraine on this path, as well as failures or moments that hinder the reform process in the country. In general, the European Union is not yet ready to officially talk about the prospects of Ukraine's accession to the ranks of member states, but Ukraine's European perspective is recognized. In 2021, Ukraine was preparing to formally apply for EU membership in 2024, in order to join the European Union in the 2030s.

On 13 September 2023, during her State of the European Union address, President of the European Commission, Ursula von der Leyen, stated that the future of Ukraine was "in our Union".

On 14 December 2023, the European Council decided to open accession negotiations with Ukraine. Hungary long opposed talks starting accession negotiations, did not veto the move. Prime Minister Viktor Orban left the room momentarily in what officials described as a pre-agreed and constructive manner, while the other 26 leaders went ahead with the vote.

On 21 June 2024, the European Union agreed to start membership negotiations with Ukraine.

In 2025, deputy prime minister for European and Euro-Atlantic integration Olha Stefanishyna announced a roadmap to Ukraine's accession.

In July 2025, Ukrainian lawmakers voted to scuttle the independence of anti-corruption agencies in the country. The European Commission warned Ukraine that this move will have consequences for EU accession. On 31 July, President Volodymyr Zelenskyy restored the independence of Ukraine's two main anti-corruption agencies hours after lawmakers approved the bill 331 to 0, saying the legislation "guarantees the absence of any kind of outside influence (or) interference".

== Application ==
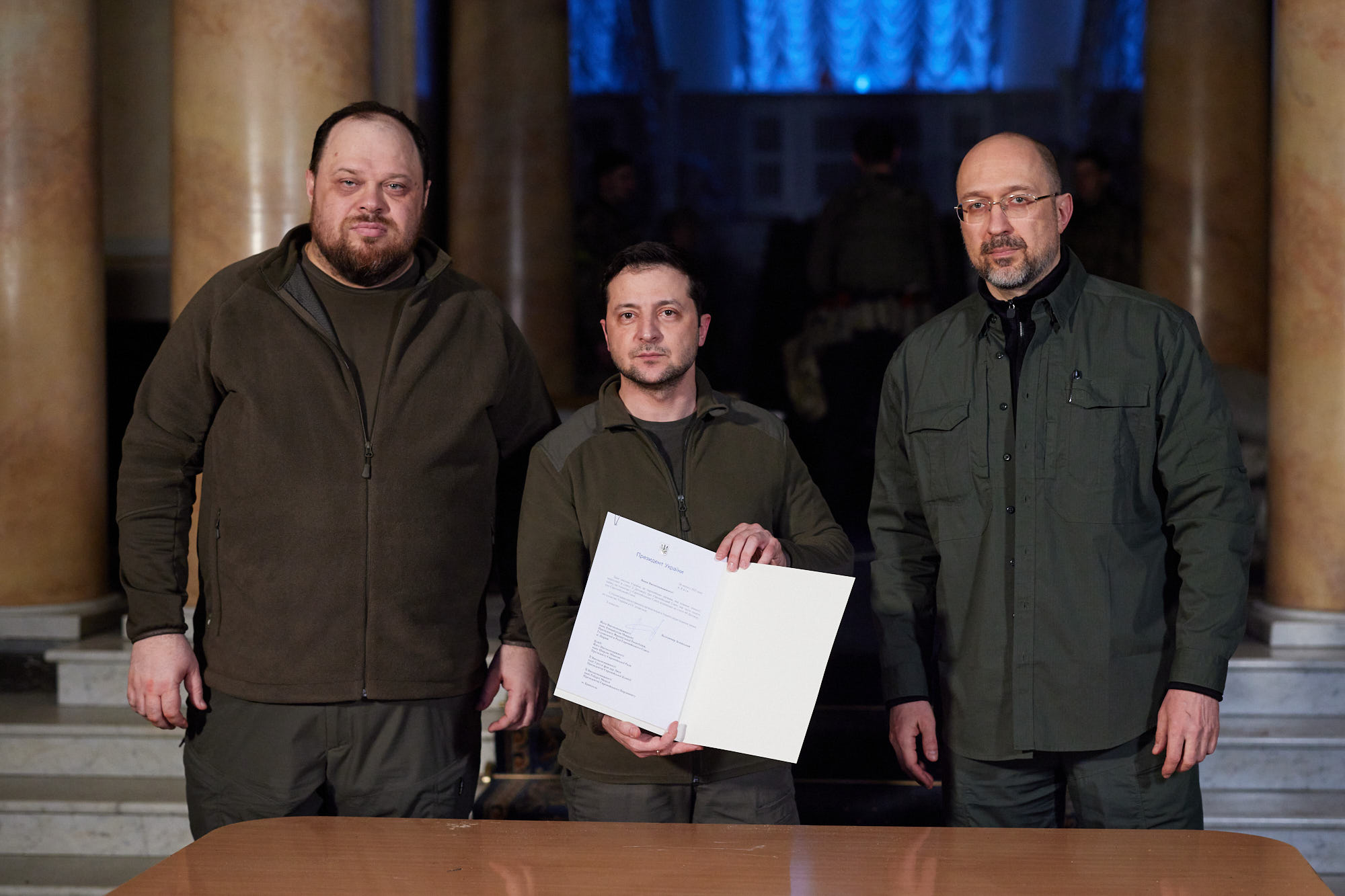
Signing of the application for accession to the EU, 28 February 2022

Following the Russian invasion of Ukraine in 2022, there were additional calls to start a formal accession process: Ukraine reiterated its desire to become a member of the union, and European Commission president von der Leyen stated that Ukraine belongs in the European Union. Slovak prime minister Eduard Heger expressed support for an accelerated accession process.

On 26 February 2022, Polish president Andrzej Duda called for Ukraine's accelerated accession to the EU. On 27 February, Slovenian prime minister Janez Janša, together with Polish prime minister Mateusz Morawiecki, proposed a plan for Ukraine's rapid integration into the EU by 2030 in a letter to European Council president Charles Michel. Slovak prime minister Eduard Heger also proposed to the EU to create a new special procedure for Ukrainian accession, in order to help Ukraine get back on its feet and recover from the war in the future.

On 28 February, Ukraine officially submitted a letter of application for membership. Due to the ongoing crisis, President Zelenskyy requested immediate admission to the European Union under a special procedure. On the same day, eight EU states signed a letter supporting an accelerated accession process for Ukraine, and on 1 March, Hungarian foreign minister Péter Szijjártó stated his country would also support an accelerated process. On 1 March, the European Parliament, following a debate in which the president of Ukraine addressed and received applause, recommended that Ukraine be made an official candidate for EU membership. The European Parliament voted to advance Ukraine's membership with 637 in favour, 13 against, and 26 abstained.

On 1 March, the presidents of eight EU member states (Bulgaria, the Czech Republic, Estonia, Latvia, Lithuania, Poland, Slovakia and Slovenia) signed an open letter calling on Ukraine to be given the prospect of EU membership and start the process of negotiations immediately. On the same day, Hungarian foreign minister Péter Szijjártó called for Ukraine's accelerated accession to the European Union.

On 2 March, Spanish foreign minister José Manuel Albares stated that "belonging to the EU is not a capricious process or one that can be done by a mere political decision", reminding that the candidate country "must meet certain social, political and economic standards".

On 7 March, the EU said it will formally assess Ukraine's application and on 10 March, the Council of the European Union asked the commission for its opinion on the application.

On 9 March, the Polish Senate adopted a resolution calling on the countries of the European Union to support the accelerated process of Ukraine's accession to the EU with 93 votes in favor. "Ukrainian society has undoubtedly proved that it is ready to be part of a united Europe and ready to pay with blood for devotion to European values. Ukrainian soldiers, defending the borders of their country, protect the whole of Europe," the document reads.

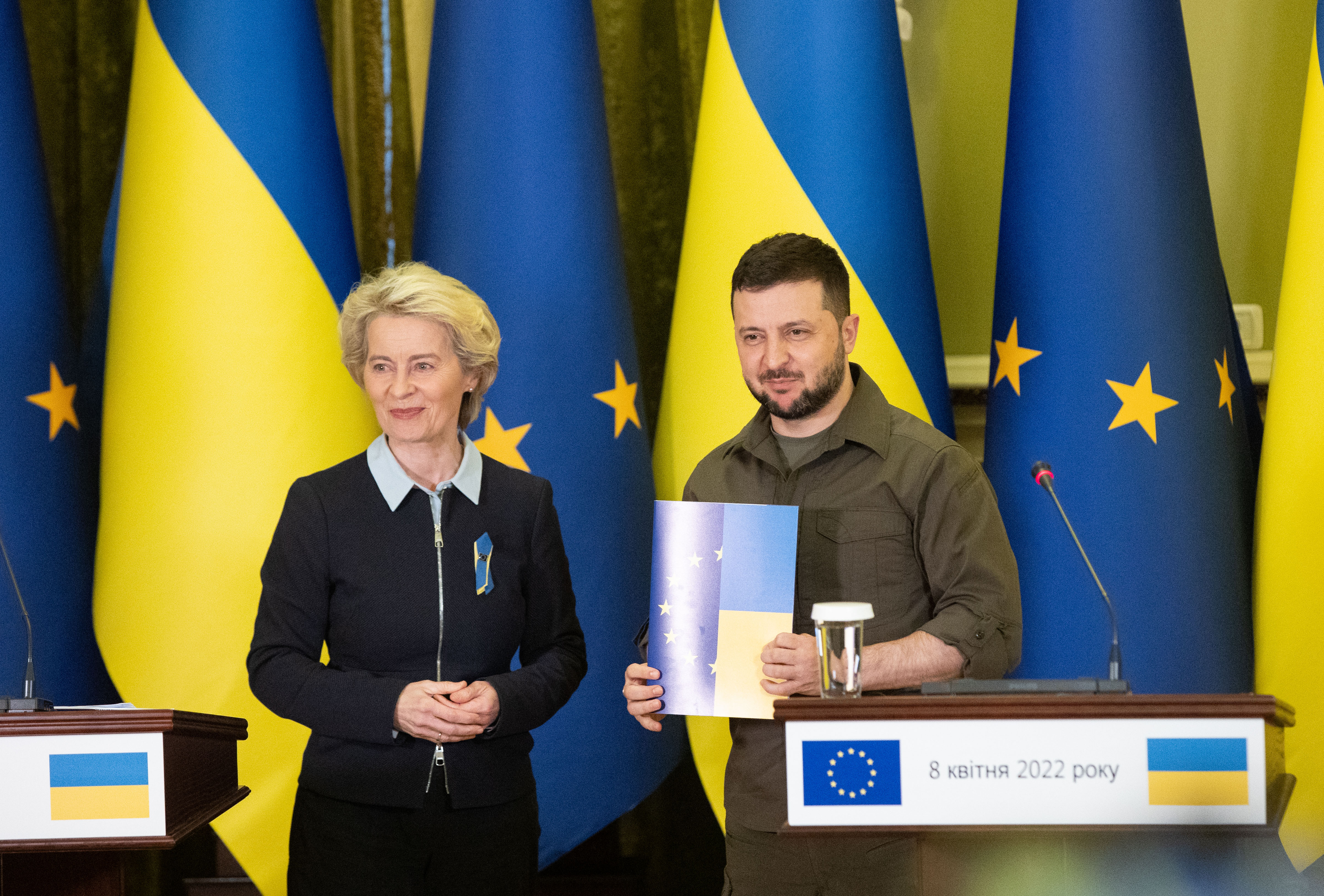
Presentation of the EU membership questionnaire on 8 April 2022, by the President of the European Commission von der Leyen and the President of Ukraine Volodymyr Zelenskyy.

On 8 April, Commission president von der Leyen, after visiting Bucha in the aftermath of a massacre there, visited Kyiv and met with President Zelenskyy. Von der Leyen presented Zelenskyy with the legislative questionnaire to begin Ukraine's application and offered to fast-track the process. Borrell announced that the EU delegation to Ukraine, headed by Matti Maasikas, will return to Kyiv after it was evacuated at the outbreak of war. On 17 April, Ukraine responded to the first part of the legislative questionnaire, while it responded to the second and final part on 9 May.

=== Candidacy ===
According to Olha Stefanishyna, the Ukrainian deputy prime minister for European and Euro-Atlantic integration, three EU countries opposed granting candidate status to Ukraine; according to Bloomberg, the Netherlands and Denmark were two of them. Germany offered to give Ukraine a conditional status, under promises to fulfill certain requirements.

On 29 May, in order to support Ukraine's accession to the EU, in particular to obtain the status of a candidate for membership in the European Union, the Government of Ukraine launched a communication campaign "Embrace Ukraine. Strengthen the Union" set for 25–26 June.

After a meeting with Volodymyr Zelenskyy on 16 June in Kyiv, the leaders of Germany, Italy, Romania and France called for immediate candidate status for EU membership for Ukraine. Federal Chancellor of Germany Olaf Scholz noted that Ukraine's further movement into the EU, if all countries agree to grant it candidate status, depends on its own efforts. Separately, French president Emmanuel Macron explained that the visit to Ukraine of the leaders of the three largest EU economies - Germany, Italy and France, as well as the president of Romania was aimed at creating unanimity in the European Union regarding Ukraine's first step towards accession, which is the granting of candidate status: it was accepted the decision to grant Ukraine candidate status without additional conditions, but then to impose conditions on reforms at all subsequent stages.

On 17 June, Foreign Minister Jeppe Kofod said that the Danish government is ready to support granting Ukraine candidate status for EU accession if the European Commission provides a positive recommendation. The Netherlands on the same day appealed to the European Commission with a call to carefully prescribe the conditions for Ukraine's further approach to EU membership. In particular, the European Commission is called upon to prescribe in its conclusion what reforms Ukraine will have to implement in the future. The Netherlands provided a detailed description of what they consider to be the essential criteria.

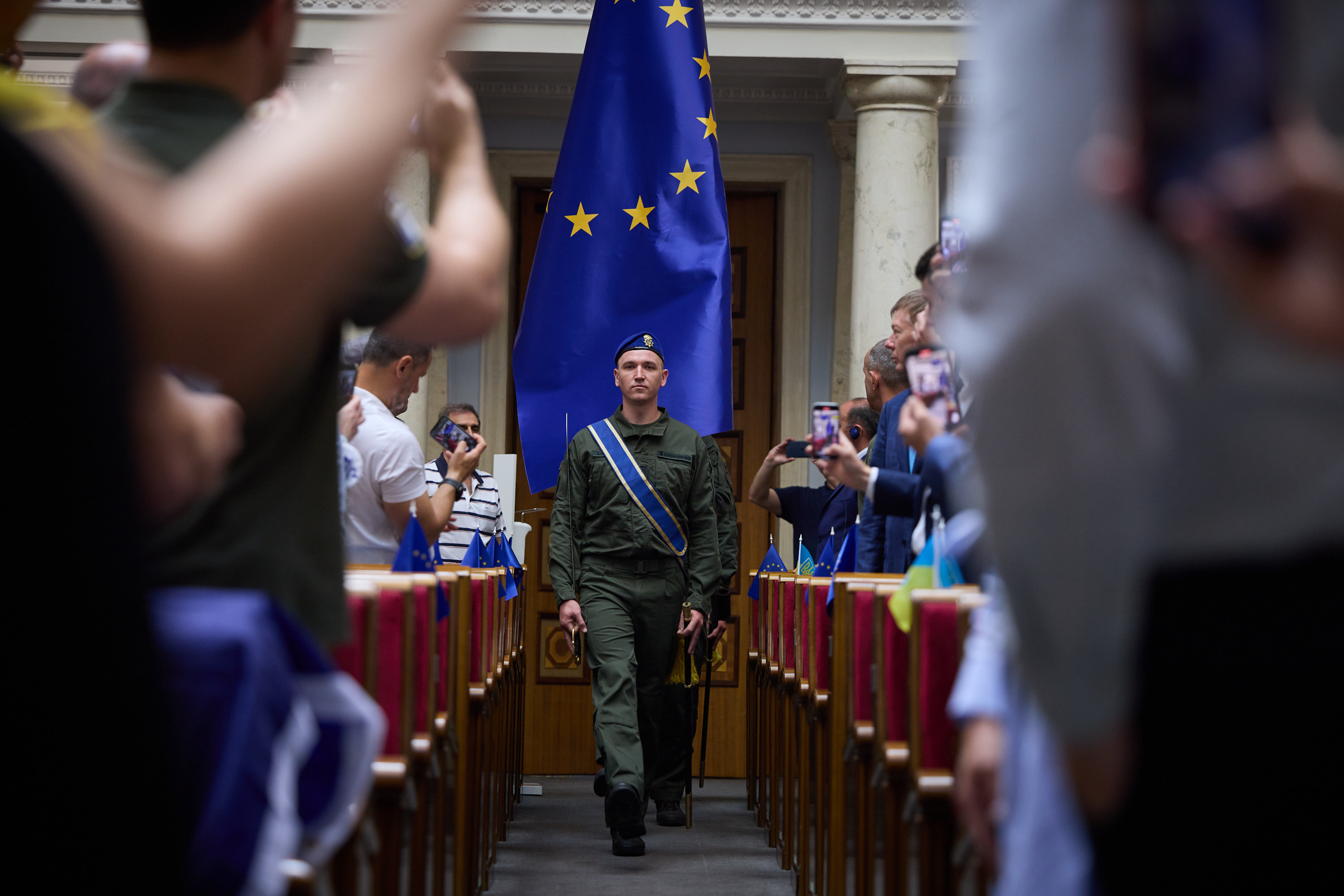
The flag of Europe being brought into the hall of the Verkhovna Rada on 1 July 2022. The event shares similar connotations with the introduction of the flag of Ukraine after the country's declaration of independence.

Also on 17 June, the European Commission recommended that the European Council grant Ukraine the perspective to become a member of the European Union and candidate status for accession. Simultaneously with the recommendation to approve the candidate status, the Commission listed seven required reforms to be implemented by Ukraine:

1. Reform of the Constitutional Court;
2. Continuation of judicial reform;
3. Anti-corruption, including the appointment of the head of the SAPO;
4. Anti-money laundering;
5. Implementation of the anti-oligarchic law, including recommendations of the Venice Commission;
6. Harmonization of audio-visual media legislation with that of the European Union;
7. Change in legislation on national minorities.

On 23 June, the European Parliament adopted a resolution calling for the immediate granting of candidate status for membership of the European Union to Ukraine and Moldova, as well as to support the European perspective for Georgia. On the same day, the European Council granted Ukraine the status of a candidate for accession to the European Union, contingent on meeting the seven required reforms.

Progress on seven required reforms
| Criterion | Jun 2023 | Nov 2023 | Nov 2024 |
|---|---|---|---|
| 1. Constitutional Court | Good progress | Completed | Completed |
| 2. Judicial governance | Completed | Completed | Completed |
| 3. Anti-corruption | Some progress | Good progress | Completed |
| 4. Anti-money laundering | Some progress | Completed | Completed |
| 5. De-oligarchisation | Some progress | Good progress | Completed |
| 6. Media legislation | Completed | Completed | Completed |
| 7. National minorities | Some progress | Good progress | Completed |

At first, the European Commission committed to assess completion of the seven criteria at the end of 2022, after which the next steps will be defined. The Ukrainian government pledged that it would complete the seven requirements by the end of autumn 2022. However, the European Council indicated this assessment would be considered at the next annual enlargement package in October 2023. By November 2022, the commission had still not started its assessment of the criteria. The second independent Candidate Check assessment, by a group including the New Europe Center and European Pravda, assessed progress at 4.7/10. In December, the Commission agreed to present a "preliminary assessment" of the seven requirements by spring 2023.

In his speech in Moldova on 28 March 2023, Charles Michel, president of the European Council, stated that he hoped they would be able to open accession negotiations with Ukraine and Moldova by the end of the year.

On 22 June, EU Neighbourhood and Enlargement Commissioner Olivér Várhelyi provided an oral update on Ukraine's progress toward the seven reforms. On 22 September, the fifth Candidate Check assessment was released, rating Ukraine's progress on the seven reforms at 8.1/10. The 2023 enlargement package report, released by the European Commission on 8 November, provided another update on Ukraine's progress towards these reforms, with four of the seven criteria assessed as having been completed. The 2024 enlargement package report, released on 30 October, provided 'some progress' assessment on Ukraine's progress towards these reforms with only one completed.

== Negotiations ==
On 2 February 2023, the European Commission published an analytical report on Ukraine's alignment with the EU acquis, "complet[ing] the Commission's Opinion on Ukraine's application for membership of the EU adopted on 17 June 2022".

On 8 November 2023, the European Commission recommended opening accession negotiations with Ukraine. On 14 December 2023, the European Council decided to open accession negotiations with Ukraine. On 21 June 2024, the European Union agreed to start membership negotiations with Ukraine. Accession negotiations began on 25 June 2024, at the same time as those with Moldova.

On 13 November 2024, the Ukrainian Government announced the completion of the screening of the first cluster of negotiation chapters.

On 16 January 2025, the European Commission submitted its first screening report to the European Council. European Pravda also reported that the screening process will last until autumn 2025, according to a European Commission spokesperson.

On 13 March 2025, the Ukrainian Government announced the completion of the screening of the second cluster of negotiation chapters.

On 30 September 2025, the European Commission announced that Ukraine completed bilateral screening in all chapters, however, further efforts to formally proceed with negotiations were being blocked by Hungary over concerns about minority language rights of ethnic Hungarians in Ukraine. Despite this veto, Ukraine received a Draft Common Position (DCP) on clusters 1, 2 and 6 during the informal meeting of EU Ministers for European Affairs with Ukraine on 11 December 2025, allowing technical work on negotiations to begin. This marked the first time in EU history that an official negotiations position was revealed to a candidate country prior to the official opening of its respective cluster.

At the COREPER meeting on 12 June 2026 the 27 EU member ambassadors gave a positive assessement on the opening of the Fundamentals cluster with both Ukraine and Moldova. Formal opening of the 5 chapters inside the Fundamentals cluster took place during the Second Accession Conference with Ukraine on 15 June 2026.

During the Third Accession Conference with Ukraine on 14 July 2026, Cluster 6 (External Relations) was formally opened along with the two chapters inside of it: Chapter 30 (External Relations) and Chapter 31 (Foreign, Security & Defence Policy).

During the COREPER meeting on 7 October 2026, the 27 EU ambassadors approved the screening letters for both Ukraine and Moldova for Cluster 2 (Internal Market) and Cluster 3 (Competitiveness and Inclusive Growth) after Hungary dropped its opposition amid the approval of legislation on the rights of ethnic minorities by the Ukrainian parliament. Clusters 2 and 3 were formally opened during the 4th Accession Conference with Ukraine on 13 October 2026.

The next step for Ukraine and Moldova is to open the two remaining clusters by December 2026 - Cluster 4 (Green Agenda and Sustainable Connectivity) and Cluster 5 (Resources, Agriculture and Cohesion).

According to Politico, which has obtained a draft accession roadmap for Ukraine ahead of its planned publication on 4 November 2026, Ukraine could provisionally close seven chapters during 2027. In the first half of the year Chapter 26 (Education & Culture) could be provisionally closed. In the second half of the year Chapter 7 (Intellectual Property Law), Chapter 19 (Social Policy & Employment), Chapter 20 (Enterprise & Industrial Policy), Chapter 25 (Science & Research), Chapter 30 (External Relations) and Chapter 31 (Foreign, Security & Defence Policy) could be provisionally closed. The report states IBAR requirements would have to be met in the first half of 2027 before any chapters could be closed.

=== Chapters ===
Chapter and screening dates
| Cluster | Acquis chapter | 33 / 33 100% complete | 33 / 33 100% complete | 24 / 33 72.7% complete | 0 / 33 0% complete |
| Cluster | Acquis chapter | Screening started | Screening completed | Chapter opened | Chapter closed |
|---|---|---|---|---|---|
| 1. Fundamentals | 23. Judiciary & Fundamental Rights | 2024-09-17 | 2024-09-17 | 2026-06-15 | |
| 1. Fundamentals | 24. Justice, Freedom & Security | 2024-10-23 | 2024-10-25 | 2026-06-15 | |
| 1. Fundamentals | 5. Public Procurement | 2024-07-08 | 2024-07-09 | 2026-06-15 | |
| 1. Fundamentals | 18. Statistics | 2024-11-11 | 2024-11-12 | 2026-06-15 | |
| 1. Fundamentals | 32. Financial Control | 2024-10-08 | 2024-10-10 | 2026-06-15 | |
| 2. Internal Market | 1. Free Movement of Goods | 2025-03-03 | 2025-03-06 | 2026-10-13 | |
| 2. Internal Market | 2. Freedom of Movement For Workers | 2024-11-19 | 2024-11-19 | 2026-10-13 | |
| 2. Internal Market | 3. Right of Establishment & Freedom To Provide Services | 2024-11-21 | 2024-11-22 | 2026-10-13 | |
| 2. Internal Market | 4. Free Movement of Capital | 2024-11-20 | 2024-11-20 | 2026-10-13 | |
| 2. Internal Market | 6. Company Law | 2025-03-13 | 2025-03-13 | 2026-10-13 | |
| 2. Internal Market | 7. Intellectual Property Law | 2024-12-10 | 2024-12-11 | 2026-10-13 | |
| 2. Internal Market | 8. Competition Policy | 2025-01-27 | 2025-01-29 | 2026-10-13 | |
| 2. Internal Market | 9. Financial Services | 2025-02-13 | 2025-02-14 | 2026-10-13 | |
| 2. Internal Market | 28. Consumer & Health Protection | 2025-02-10 | 2025-02-12 | 2026-10-13 | |
| 3. Competitiveness; and inclusive growth | 10. Digital transformation & Media | 2025-03-31 | 2025-04-01 | 2026-10-13 | |
| 3. Competitiveness; and inclusive growth | 16. Taxation | 2025-06-05 | 2025-06-06 | 2026-10-13 | |
| 3. Competitiveness; and inclusive growth | 17. Economic & Monetary Policy | 2025-06-04 | 2025-06-04 | 2026-10-13 | |
| 3. Competitiveness; and inclusive growth | 19. Social Policy & Employment | 2025-03-24 | 2025-03-25 | 2026-10-13 | |
| 3. Competitiveness; and inclusive growth | 20. Enterprise & Industrial Policy | 2025-04-28 | 2025-04-29 | 2026-10-13 | |
| 3. Competitiveness; and inclusive growth | 25. Science & Research | 2025-03-14 | 2025-03-14 | 2026-10-13 | |
| 3. Competitiveness; and inclusive growth | 26. Education & Culture | 2025-04-30 | 2025-04-30 | 2026-10-13 | |
| 3. Competitiveness; and inclusive growth | 29. Customs Union | 2025-04-10 | 2025-04-11 | 2026-10-13 | |
| 4. Green agenda and; sustainable connectivity | 14. Transport | 2025-06-24 | 2025-06-27 | | |
| 4. Green agenda and; sustainable connectivity | 15. Energy | 2025-07-08 | 2025-07-09 | | |
| 4. Green agenda and; sustainable connectivity | 21. Trans-European Networks | 2025-06-24 | 2025-07-09 | | |
| 4. Green agenda and; sustainable connectivity | 27. Environment & Climate Change | 2025-06-16 | 2025-06-20 | | |
| 5. Resources, agriculture; and cohesion | 11. Agriculture & Rural Development | 2025-09-08 | 2025-09-10 | | |
| 5. Resources, agriculture; and cohesion | 12. Food Safety, Veterinary & Phytosanitary Policy | 2025-09-15 | 2025-09-19 | | |
| 5. Resources, agriculture; and cohesion | 13. Fisheries | 2025-09-25 | 2025-09-26 | | |
| 5. Resources, agriculture; and cohesion | 22. Regional Policy & Coordination of Structural Instruments | 2025-09-29 | 2025-09-30 | | |
| 5. Resources, agriculture; and cohesion | 33. Financial & Budgetary Provisions | 2025-09-11 | 2025-09-11 | | |
| 6. External relations | 30. External Relations | 2025-01-30 | 2025-01-30 | 2026-07-14 | |
| 6. External relations | 31. Foreign, Security & Defence Policy | 2025-03-07 | 2025-03-07 | 2026-07-14 | |

November 2026 European Commission Report
| Acquis chapter | Status as of Nov 2026 | Chapter Status as of October 2026 |
|---|---|---|
| Overview | 3 chapters in early stage, 12 chapters with some level of preparation, 8 chapters with some/moderate preparation, 4 chapters with a moderate level of preparation, 1 chapter with moderate/good preparation 5 chapters with a good level of preparation | 9 chapters unopened, 24 chapters open. |
| 1. Free Movement of Goods | Moderate / Good | Chapter open |
| 2. Freedom of Movement For Workers | Early stage | Chapter open |
| 3. Right of Establishment & Freedom To Provide Services | Some level of preparation | Chapter open |
| 4. Free Movement of Capital | Some / Moderate | Chapter open |
| 5. Public Procurement | Some / Moderate | Chapter open |
| 6. Company Law | Some level of preparation | Chapter open |
| 7. Intellectual Property Law | Some level of preparation | Chapter open |
| 8. Competition Policy | Some level of preparation | Chapter open |
| 9. Financial Services | Some / Moderate | Chapter open |
| 10. Information Society & Media | Good level of preparation | Chapter open |
| 11. Agriculture & Rural Development | Some level of preparation | Chapter unopened |
| 12. Food Safety, Veterinary & Phytosanitary Policy | Moderately prepared | Chapter unopened |
| 13. Fisheries | Some level of preparation | Chapter unopened |
| 14. Transport Policy | Some level of preparation | Chapter unopened |
| 15. Energy | Good level of preparation | Chapter unopened |
| 16. Taxation | Some / Moderate | Chapter open |
| 17. Economic & Monetary Policy | Moderately prepared | Chapter open |
| 18. Statistics | Some level of preparation | Chapter open |
| 19. Social Policy & Employment | Early stage | Chapter open |
| 20. Enterprise & Industrial Policy | Some / Moderate | Chapter open |
| 21. Trans-European Networks | Some level of preparation | Chapter unopened |
| 22. Regional Policy & Coordination of Structural Instruments | Some level of preparation | Chapter unopened |
| 23. Judiciary & Fundamental Rights | Some / Moderate | Chapter open |
| 24. Justice, Freedom & Security | Some / Moderate | Chapter open |
| 25. Science & Research | Moderately prepared | Chapter open |
| 26. Education & Culture | Moderately prepared | Chapter open |
| 27. Environment & Climate Change | Some level of preparation | Chapter unopened |
| 28. Consumer & Health Protection | Some / Moderate | Chapter open |
| 29. Customs Union | Good level of preparation | Chapter open |
| 30. External Relations | Good level of preparation | Chapter open |
| 31. Foreign, Security & Defence Policy | Good level of preparation | Chapter open |
| 32. Financial Control | Some level of preparation | Chapter open |
| 33. Financial & Budgetary Provisions | Early stage | Chapter unopened |
| 34. Institutions | Nothing to adopt | Nothing to adopt |
| 35. Other Issues | Nothing to adopt | Nothing to adopt |
Legend: Well advanced Good / Well advanced Good level of preparation Moderate / Good Moderately prepared Some / Moderate Some level of preparation Early stage / Some Early stage

Report history
| Cluster | Chapter | Level of preparation | | | | |
| Cluster | Chapter | 2022 (Note: Published February 2023.) | 2023 | 2024 (Note: Level of progress on 'some level' of preparation clusters criteria assessed as 'some'.) | 2025 | 2026 |
|---|---|---|---|---|---|---|
| 1. Fundamentals | Public administration reform | — | Some level of preparation | Some level of preparation | Some / Moderate | Moderately prepared |
| 1. Fundamentals | 23. Judiciary & Fundamental Rights | — (Note: "The substance of this chapter was covered in the Commission Opinion.") | Some level of preparation | Some level of preparation | Some level of preparation | Some / Moderate |
| 1. Fundamentals | 24. Justice, Freedom & Security | Some level of preparation | Some level of preparation | Some level of preparation | Some level of preparation | Some / Moderate |
| 1. Fundamentals | The existence of a functioning market economy | — | Early stage / Some | Early stage / Some | Some level of preparation | Some level of preparation |
| 1. Fundamentals | The capacity to cope with competitive pressure and market forces within the Union | — | Early stage | Early stage | Early stage / Some | Some level of preparation |
| 1. Fundamentals | 5. Public Procurement | Some level of preparation | Some level of preparation | Some level of preparation | Some level of preparation | Some / Moderate |
| 1. Fundamentals | 18. Statistics | Some level of preparation | Some level of preparation | Some level of preparation | Some level of preparation | Some level of preparation |
| 1. Fundamentals | 32. Financial Control | Early stage | Early stage | Early stage | Some level of preparation | Some level of preparation |
| 2. Internal Market | 1. Free Movement of Goods | Moderately prepared | Moderately prepared | Moderately prepared | Moderately prepared | Moderate / Good |
| 2. Internal Market | 2. Freedom of Movement For Workers | Early stage | Early stage | Early stage | Early stage | Early stage |
| 2. Internal Market | 3. Right of Establishment & Freedom To Provide Services | Some level of preparation | Some level of preparation | Some level of preparation | Some level of preparation | Some level of preparation |
| 2. Internal Market | 4. Free Movement of Capital | Some level of preparation | Some / Moderate | Some / Moderate | Some / Moderate | Some / Moderate |
| 2. Internal Market | 6. Company Law | Some level of preparation | Some level of preparation | Some level of preparation | Some level of preparation | Some level of preparation |
| 2. Internal Market | 7. Intellectual Property Law | Early stage | Some level of preparation | Some level of preparation | Some level of preparation | Some level of preparation |
| 2. Internal Market | 8. Competition Policy | Some level of preparation | Some level of preparation | Some level of preparation | Some level of preparation | Some level of preparation |
| 2. Internal Market | 9. Financial Services | Some level of preparation | Some level of preparation | Some level of preparation | Some level of preparation | Some / Moderate |
| 2. Internal Market | 28. Consumer & Health Protection | Some level of preparation | Some level of preparation | Some level of preparation | Some / Moderate | Some / Moderate |
| 3. Competitiveness; and inclusive growth | 10. Digital transformation & Media | Moderately prepared | Moderate / Good | Moderate / Good | Moderate / Good | Good level of preparation |
| 3. Competitiveness; and inclusive growth | 16. Taxation | Some level of preparation | Some level of preparation | Some level of preparation | Some level of preparation | Some / Moderate |
| 3. Competitiveness; and inclusive growth | 17. Economic & Monetary Policy | Moderately prepared | Moderately prepared | Moderately prepared | Moderately prepared | Moderately prepared |
| 3. Competitiveness; and inclusive growth | 19. Social Policy & Employment | Early stage | Early stage | Early stage | Early stage | Early stage |
| 3. Competitiveness; and inclusive growth | 20. Enterprise & Industrial Policy | Some level of preparation | Some level of preparation | Some / Moderate | Some / Moderate | Some / Moderate |
| 3. Competitiveness; and inclusive growth | 25. Science & Research | Moderately prepared | Moderately prepared | Moderately prepared | Moderately prepared | Moderately prepared |
| 3. Competitiveness; and inclusive growth | 26. Education & Culture | Some level of preparation | Some level of preparation | Some level of preparation | Some / Moderate | Moderately prepared |
| 3. Competitiveness; and inclusive growth | 29. Customs Union | Good level of preparation | Good level of preparation | Good level of preparation | Good level of preparation | Good level of preparation |
| 4. Green agenda and; sustainable connectivity | 14. Transport | Some level of preparation | Some level of preparation | Some level of preparation | Some level of preparation | Some level of preparation |
| 4. Green agenda and; sustainable connectivity | 15. Energy | Good level of preparation | Good level of preparation | Good level of preparation | Good level of preparation | Good level of preparation |
| 4. Green agenda and; sustainable connectivity | 21. Trans-European Networks | Some level of preparation | Some level of preparation | Some level of preparation | Some level of preparation | Some level of preparation |
| 4. Green agenda and; sustainable connectivity | 27. Environment & Climate Change | Early stage | Some level of preparation | Some level of preparation | Some level of preparation | Some level of preparation |
| 5. Resources, agriculture; and cohesion | 11. Agriculture & Rural Development | Early stage | Early stage | Early stage | Early stage / Some | Some level of preparation |
| 5. Resources, agriculture; and cohesion | 12. Food Safety, Veterinary & Phytosanitary Policy | Moderately prepared | Moderately prepared | Moderately prepared | Moderately prepared | Moderately prepared |
| 5. Resources, agriculture; and cohesion | 13. Fisheries | Early stage | Some level of preparation | Some level of preparation | Some level of preparation | Some level of preparation |
| 5. Resources, agriculture; and cohesion | 22. Regional Policy & Coordination of Structural Instruments | Some level of preparation | Some level of preparation | Some level of preparation | Some level of preparation | Some level of preparation |
| 5. Resources, agriculture; and cohesion | 33. Financial & Budgetary Provisions | Early stage | Early stage | Early stage | Early stage | Early stage |
| 6. External relations | 30. External Relations | Good level of preparation | Good level of preparation | Good level of preparation | Good level of preparation | Good level of preparation |
| 6. External relations | 31. Foreign, Security & Defence Policy | Good level of preparation | Good level of preparation | Good level of preparation | Good level of preparation | Good level of preparation |
Legend: Well advanced Good / Well advanced Good level of preparation Moderate / Good Moderately prepared Some / Moderate Some level of preparation Early stage / Some Early stage Notes:

Chapter progress by report year
| Clusters | Acquis Chapter | November 2023 Report | October 2024 Report | November 2025 Report | November 2026 Report |
|---|---|---|---|---|---|
| 1. Fundamentals | Public administration reform | Limited progress | Some progress | Good progress | Good progress |
| 1. Fundamentals | 23. Judiciary & Fundamental Rights | Good progress | Some progress | Some progress | Some progress |
| 1. Fundamentals | 24. Justice, Freedom & Security | Limited progress | Some progress | Some progress | Some progress |
| 1. Fundamentals | The existence of a functioning market economy | - | Some progress | Good progress | Some progress |
| 1. Fundamentals | The capacity to cope with competitive pressure and market forces within the Union | - | Limited progress | Good progress | Good progress |
| 1. Fundamentals | 5. Public Procurement | Limited progress | Limited progress | Limited progress | Some progress |
| 1. Fundamentals | 18. Statistics | Limited progress | Some progress | Some progress | Some progress |
| 1. Fundamentals | 32. Financial Control | Limited progress | Limited progress | Good progress | Some progress |
| 2. Internal Market | 1. Free Movement of Goods | Some progress | Some progress | Some progress | Good progress |
| 2. Internal Market | 2. Freedom of Movement For Workers | No progress | No progress | Limited progress | Limited progress |
| 2. Internal Market | 3. Right of Establishment & Freedom To Provide Services | Some progress | Limited progress | Limited progress | Limited progress |
| 2. Internal Market | 4. Free Movement of Capital | Some/good progress | Some progress | Some progress | Limited progress |
| 2. Internal Market | 6. Company Law | Some progress | Some progress | Limited progress | Limited progress |
| 2. Internal Market | 7. Intellectual Property Law | Good progress | Limited progress | Some progress | Limited progress |
| 2. Internal Market | 8. Competition Policy | Limited progress | Limited progress | Limited progress | Limited progress |
| 2. Internal Market | 9. Financial Services | Some progress | Some progress | Some progress | Good progress |
| 2. Internal Market | 28. Consumer & Health Protection | Limited progress | Some progress | Good progress | Some progress |
| 3. Competitiveness; and inclusive growth | 10. Digital transformation & Media | Good progress | Some progress | Some progress | Good progress |
| 3. Competitiveness; and inclusive growth | 16. Taxation | Some progress | Good progress | Good progress | Good progress |
| 3. Competitiveness; and inclusive growth | 17. Economic & Monetary Policy | No progress | Good progress | Some progress | Some progress |
| 3. Competitiveness; and inclusive growth | 19. Social Policy & Employment | Limited progress | Limited progress | Some progress | Some progress |
| 3. Competitiveness; and inclusive growth | 20. Enterprise & Industrial Policy | Limited progress | Good progress | Some progress | Some progress |
| 3. Competitiveness; and inclusive growth | 25. Science & Research | Limited progress | Some progress | Good progress | Good progress |
| 3. Competitiveness; and inclusive growth | 26. Education & Culture | Some progress | Some progress | Good progress | Good progress |
| 3. Competitiveness; and inclusive growth | 29. Customs Union | Good progress | Good progress | Good progress | Good progress |
| 4. Green agenda; and sustainable connectivity | 14. Transport | Limited progress | Limited progress | Some progress | Some progress |
| 4. Green agenda; and sustainable connectivity | 15. Energy | Some progress | Some progress | Some progress | Good progress |
| 4. Green agenda; and sustainable connectivity | 21. Trans-European Networks | Some progress | Some progress | Some progress | Some progress |
| 4. Green agenda; and sustainable connectivity | 27. Environment & Climate Change | Good progress | Some progress | Good progress | Some progress |
| 5. Resources, agriculture; and cohesion | 11. Agriculture & Rural Development | Some progress | Some progress | Good progress | Good progress |
| 5. Resources, agriculture; and cohesion | 12. Food Safety, Veterinary & Phytosanitary Policy | Some progress | Some progress | Some progress | Some progress |
| 5. Resources, agriculture; and cohesion | 13. Fisheries | Some progress | Good progress | Some progress | Some progress |
| 5. Resources, agriculture; and cohesion | 22. Regional Policy & Coordination of Structural Instruments | Limited progress | Limited progress | Some progress | Limited progress |
| 5. Resources, agriculture; and cohesion | 33. Financial & Budgetary Provisions | Limited progress | Limited progress | Some progress | Limited progress |
| 6. External relations | 30. External Relations | Limited progress | Limited progress | Limited progress | Limited progress |
| 6. External relations | 31. Foreign, Security & Defence Policy | Good progress | Good progress | Good progress | Very good progress |
| | 34. Institutions | N/A | N/A | N/A | N/A |
| | 35. Other Issues | N/A | N/A | N/A | N/A |
| | Average progress | 1.66 | 1.81 | 2.17 | 2.11 |
Legend: Chapter progress ratings are assigned scores from -4 to 4 to calculate the "Average progress" row. 4 Very good progress 3 Good progress 2.5 Some/good progress 2 Some progress 1 Limited progress 0 No progress -4 Backsliding

== Public opinion ==
=== In Ukraine ===
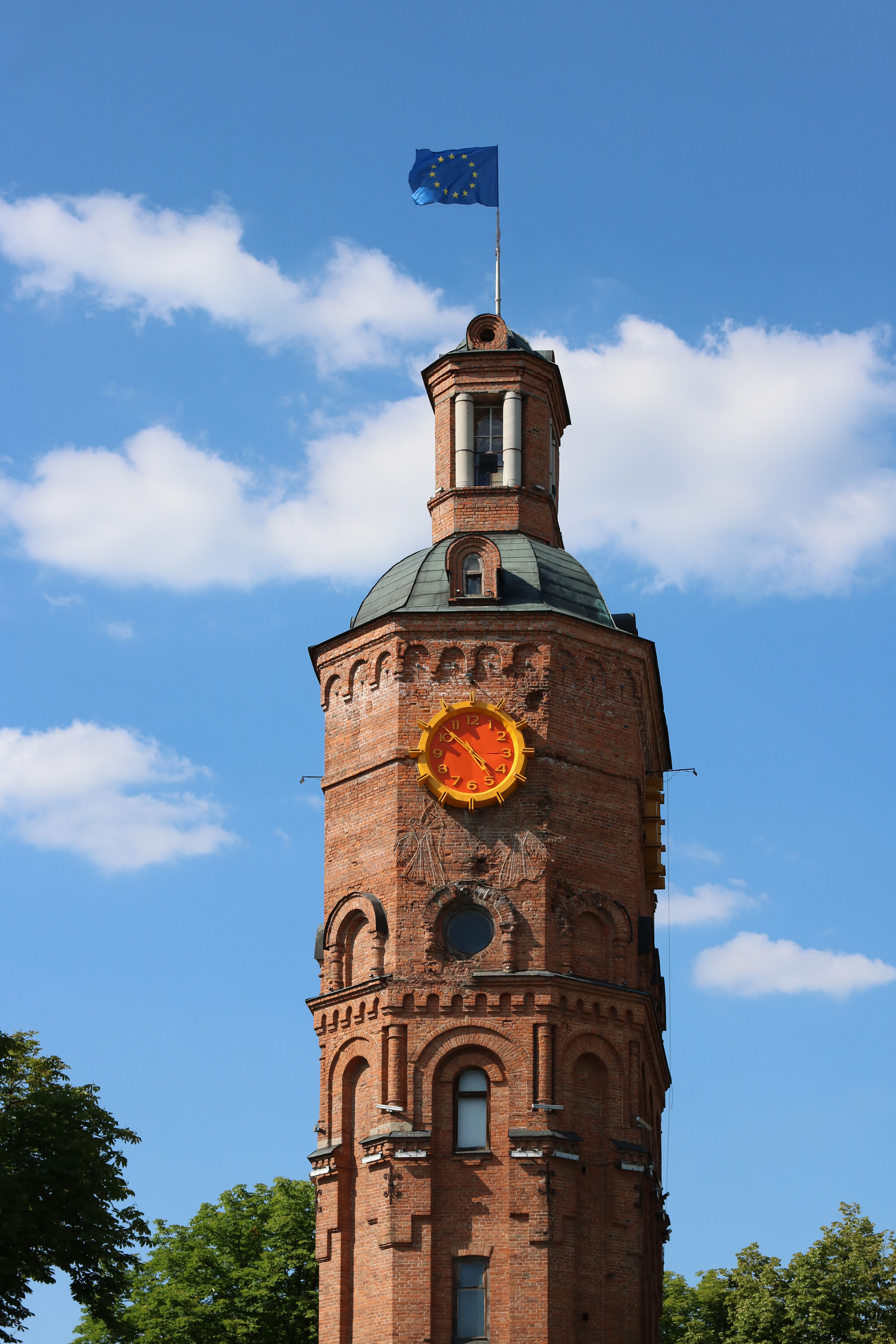
The flag of Europe flying on the tower in Vinnytsia

==== 2010s ====
Traditionally, Western Ukraine is found to be generally more enthusiastic about EU membership than Eastern Ukraine. In July 2012 and in May 2014, residents of West Ukraine (74% in July 2012 and 81% in May 2014), Central Ukraine (59% and 64%) and North Ukraine (56% and 71%) were the biggest supporters for EU membership. A June 2013 poll, on behalf of Deutsche Welle, found that 52% of Eastern Ukraine was in favor of joining the EU. But in a poll by ComRes (for CNN) in May 2014 only 19% of Eastern Ukraine considered Ukraine joining the European Union "Good". The May 2014 ComRes poll found out that in the three easternmost oblasts of Ukraine, Kharkiv Oblast, Donetsk Oblast and Luhansk Oblast, 37% favored an alliance with Russia, 14% backed an alliance with the European Union and 49% stated Ukraine would be better off if it did not ally with either.

Citizens aged between 20 and 39 appeared to be the strongest supporters of joining the EU in May 2010 and December 2011 (in December 2011 the opinion of the age group 18–29 did not vary from one region to another). In the May 2014 ComRes poll, people aged between 36 and 55 were the strongest supporters of joining the EU. Ukraine's EU ambassador, Kostiantyn Yelisieiev, stated in July 2011 that business tycoons and politicians from Ukraine's Russian speaking east were as much pro-EU as the Ukrainian speaking west of the country: "If any politician today in Ukraine declared himself to be against European integration, he would be politically dead."

==== 2020s ====
91% of Ukrainians support joining the European Union during the Russian invasion of Ukraine, according to a poll conducted by the Rating Sociological Group on 30–31 March 2022, up from 66.4% in February 2015.

According to the 2025 annual survey of opinion in Ukraine, 82% of Ukrainians say their country has good relations with the European Union (21 points up since 2016), and 70% would vote to join the EU in a referendum, with 9% opposed. The latest poll found that trust in the EU now stands at 76% – the highest since 2017 (+18 points). Half of those asked (49%) have a positive view of the European Union, compared to just 7% with a negative view. Over three-quarters (76%) believe EU membership would bring more advantages than disadvantages for Ukraine.

=== In the EU ===
==== 2020s ====
According to a survey conducted by Ifop commissioned by the Yalta European Strategy and the Fondation Jean-Jaurès from 3–7 March 2022, Ukraine's accession to the EU is supported by 92% of respondents in Poland, 71% in Italy, 68% in Germany, and 62% in France.

The Flash Eurobarometer survey conducted in April in all EU countries shows the greatest support for Ukraine's accession to the EU in Portugal, where 87% of respondents supported it. This is followed by Estonia (83%), Lithuania (82%), Poland (81%) and Ireland (79%). Hungarians are the most skeptical about Ukraine's accession, with only 48% of respondents supporting the idea and 37% against it. At the same time, Hungary has the highest share of the population who is undecided on this issue - 16% (the same in France and Belgium).

According to a poll commissioned by the New Europe Center, which has European Pravda, among those who have decided on their position, 68% of Germans, 65% of French, and 65% of Dutch people were in favor of granting Ukraine a candidacy. At the same time, 32% of Germans and 35% of the French and the Dutch each oppose such a decision. In general, 46% of German residents support granting Ukraine the status of a candidate for EU membership, 22% are against it, another 25% found it difficult to answer, and 7% found it difficult to answer the question. Among French residents, 42% support granting Ukraine candidate status, 24% do not support it, 26% do not have a clear position, another 9% found it difficult to answer. In the Netherlands, 45% of respondents support Ukraine's candidacy, 24% are opposed, 21% found it difficult to choose an answer, and 10% do not know.

In June 2025, Hungary held a public consultation in which, of the 2 million people who participated, 95% voted against Ukraine joining the EU, while only 5% supported the bid. On the other hand, in a major poll conducted in March-April 2025 by Hungary's main opposition party Tisza which included a question on Ukraine's accession, 58.2% (about 662,000 out of 1,137,266 voters) supported Ukraine's future EU membership.

A June 2025, a poll in Poland found that support for Ukraine's accession to the EU was at 35% while 42% opposed.

== Impact ==
| Member countries | Population | Area (km^{2}) | Population density (/km^{2}) | GDP (billion US$) | GDP per capita (US$) | Languages | Scripts |
| Ukraine | 32,862,000 | 603,628 | 55.4 | 190 | $6,717.82 | Ukrainian | Cyrillic |
| EU27 | 450,380,320 | 4,225,104 | 106.32 | 20,287 | 45,163 | 24 | 3 |
| EU27+1 | 483,242,320 (▲7.44%) | 4,828,732 (▲14.29%) | 99.95 (▼5.99%) | 20,477 (▲0.94%) | $42,374 (▼6.18%) | 25 (▲1) | 3 |

== See also ==
- 2016 Dutch Ukraine–European Union Association Agreement referendum
- Accession of Armenia to the European Union
- Accession of Georgia to the European Union
- Accession of Moldova to the European Union
- Enlargement of the European Union
- Potential enlargement of the European Union
- Ukraine–European Union relations
- Ukraine–NATO relations
