= Delegation of the European Union to Ukraine =

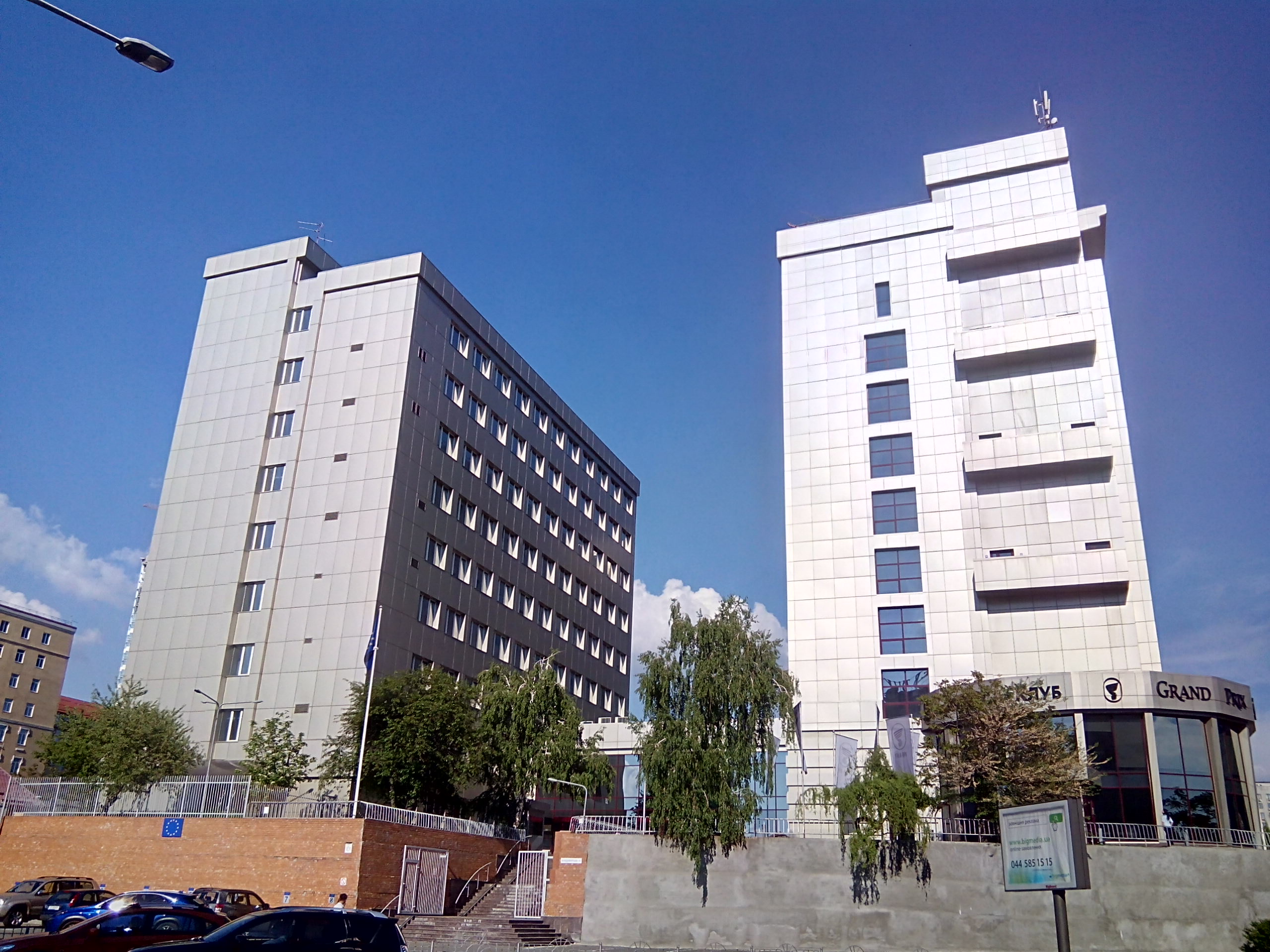
- Address: 101 Volodymyrska Street, Kyiv 01033, Ukraine
- Coordinates: 50.4328°N 30.5088°E
- Opened: September 1993 (as Delegation of the European Commission); 1 December 2009 (as Delegation of the EU)
- Ambassador: Katarína Mathernová
- Jurisdiction: Ukraine
- Website: Official website

The Delegation of the European Union to Ukraine (specifically the Representative of the European Commission and the Representative of the European Parliament) in Kyiv are the diplomatic missions of the European Commission and the European Parliament in Ukraine. It is located at 101 Volodymyrska Street in the Holosiivskyi District. The current EU ambassador to Ukraine is Slovak citizen Katarína Mathernová.

== History ==
The delegation office was first opened in September 1993 as the Delegation of the European Commission to Ukraine, and was located at 10 Kruglouniversitytetska Street in a mansion which was built in 1892 by architect Andreas Ferdinand Krauss in the neoclassical style. The delegation assumed its current name following the entering of the Treaty of Lisbon into force on 1 December 2009, and relocated to 101 Volodymyrska Street in 2013.

On 9 April 2022, Josep Borrell announced that the EU delegation to Ukraine, headed by Matti Maasikas, would return to Kyiv after it was evacuated at the outbreak of the Russian invasion of Ukraine. The delegation building was damaged by a Russian drone strike on 28 August 2025 which hit a five-story residential building nearby and killed 23 civilians. On 17 September 2025, European Parliament President Roberta Metsola opened the Parliament's antenna office co-located inside the delegation office, the third liaison office of the Parliament outside of the European Union, partly to further Ukraine's accession.

== List of representatives ==
Name	Term begin	Term end	President of the European Commission	Notes
Luis Moreno Abati	September 1993	1997	Jacques Delors	
(Belgium) André van Haeverbeke	1997	2001	Jacques Santer/ Romano Prodi	
(Belgium) Norbert Jousten	2001	2004	Romano Prodi	
(United Kingdom) Ian Boag	2004	September 2008	José Manuel Barroso	
(Portugal) José Manuel Pinto-Teixeira	September 2008	September 2012	José Manuel Barroso	
(Poland) Jan Tombiński	2012	July 2016	José Manuel Barroso/ Jean-Claude Juncker	
(France) Hugues Mingarelli	July 2016	2019	Jean-Claude Juncker	
(Estonia) Matti Maasikas	September 2019	2023	Jean-Claude Juncker/ Ursula von der Leyen	
(Slovakia) Katarína Mathernová	September 2024	present	Ursula von der Leyen	

== See also ==
- Mission of Ukraine to the European Union
- Accession of Ukraine to the European Union
- Ukraine–European Union relations
