= Andriy Veselovsky =

Ukrainian diplomat

Andriy Veselovsky Андрій Іванович Веселовський
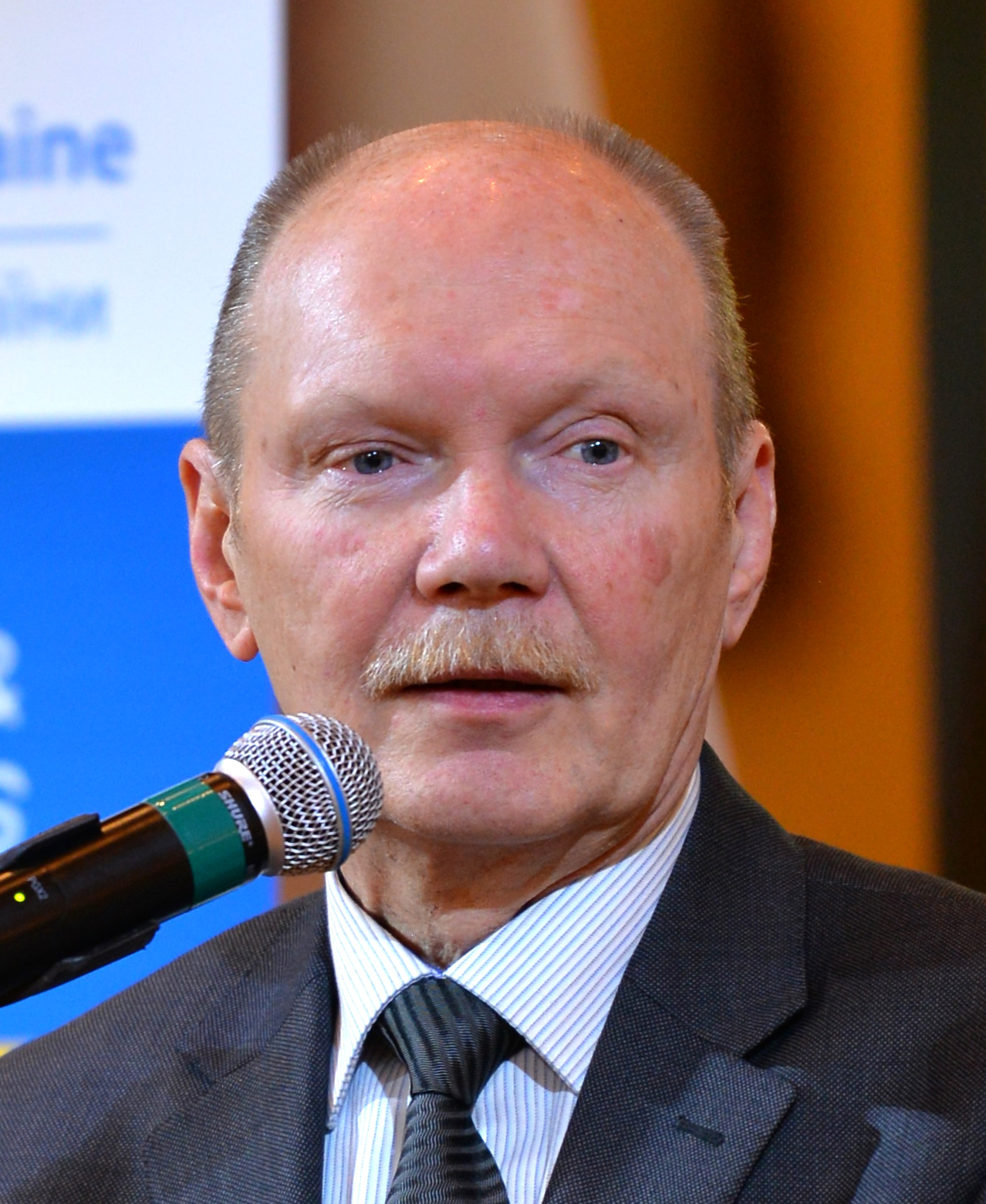

Ambassador of Ukraine to the European Union
- In office 2008–2010
- President: Viktor Yushchenko
- Preceded by: Roman Shpek
- Succeeded by: Kostiantyn Yelisieiev

Ambassador of Ukraine to Egypt
- In office 2001–2005
- President: Leonid Kuchma
- Preceded by: Ivan Kuleba
- Succeeded by: Yevhen Mykytenko

Personal details
- Born: 28 July 1951 (age 75) Lviv
- Education: Kyiv University

Andriy Ivanovych Veselovsky (birth: 28 July 1951, Lviv) is a Ukrainian diplomat. Ambassador Extraordinary and Plenipotentiary of Ukraine. Permanent Representative of Ukraine to the European Union in 2008–2010.

== Education ==
Andrei Veselovsky graduated from Institute of International relations of Taras Shevchenko National University of Kyiv in 1974. Fluent in French and English.

== Career ==
From 1974 to 1975 – he was a senior laboratory preparatory department of Kyiv Institute of Civil Engineering.

From 1975 to 1977 – he worked as an editor, senior editor, columnist graduating edition for advanced wireless telegraphy Ukrainian foreign newspaper agency in Ukraine (RATAU).

Since 1978 – Member of the Union of Journalists of Ukraine.

From 1977 to 1983 – Editor, Senior Editor of Press and Information Society of the Ukrainian cultural ties abroad.

From 1983 to 1986 – he was a translator of French in Algeria.

From 1986 to 1992 – he worked as a 2nd secretary, 1st secretary, counselor of Information Ministry of Foreign Affairs of Ukraine.

From 1992 to 1996 – Counselor of the Embassy of Ukraine in Canada.

Since July 1996 – Deputy Head of Policy Analysis and Planning

Since August 1997 – Acting Head of Policy Analysis and Planning

From January 1998 to January 2001 – he was Head of Policy Analysis and Planning, member of the board of the Ministry of Foreign Affairs of Ukraine.

From January 2001 to 5 August 2005 – Ambassador Extraordinary and Plenipotentiary of Ukraine to the Arab Republic of Egypt.

From March 2002 to October 2003 – Ambassador Extraordinary and Plenipotentiary of Ukraine to the Republic of Kenya in combination.

From April 2002 to 5 August 2005 – Ambassador Extraordinary and Plenipotentiary of Ukraine to the Republic of Sudan in combination.

27 December 2005 – 19 March 2008 – Deputy Minister of Foreign Affairs of Ukraine.

From 17 March 2008 to 12 May 2010 – Permanent Representative of Ukraine to the European Union.
