= European Pravda =

Ukrainian online newspaper

- Website type: Online newspaper
- Available in: Ukrainian; Russian; English
- Headquarters: Ukraine
- Website: www.eurointegration.com.ua
- Commercial: No
- Registration: Not required
- Launched: June 2014

European Pravda (Ukrainian: Європейська правда, romanized: Yevropeiska pravda, lit. 'European Truth') is a Ukrainian online newspaper dedicated to covering Europe, NATO and reforms in Ukraine. The "EP" website was launched in early June 2014. The publication was created by journalists and is run by Serhii Sydorenko and Yurii Panchenko.

== History ==
The idea to establish European Pravda belongs to journalists Serhii Sydorenko and Yurii Panchenko, who lost their jobs after the Kommersant Ukraine newspaper closed. It was planned that European Pravda would become a division of Ukrainska Pravda, but it became independent and was only a partner of Ukrainska Pravda.

The site was launched in early June 2014. The English version was officially launched on January 21, 2022.

== Funding ==
International donors support the project financially, on the proviso that they do not interfere in editorial policy. Financial support was provided by the European Endowment for Democracy, International Renaissance Foundation, Council of Europe, and NATO Public Diplomacy Division (PDD).

Since June 2016, European Pravda has been co-financed by the European Union. Partial co-financing is provided from the NATO PDD and from advertising revenues. From 2018, the main co-donor of the project is the National Endowment for Democracy (NED), funded from the US Congress budget.

According to the editor, Serhii Sidorenko, "EP" is a non-profit organization, as of February 2021.

== Rating ==
According to a survey of 103 experts in 2021, the online publication covered foreign policy issues the best among Ukrainian mass media.

In December 2021, Serhii Sydorenko won the National Award "High Standards of Journalism – 2021" in the category "For a sustainable, high-quality media project / product."

== See also ==
- List of newspapers in Ukraine
