= Matti Maasikas =

Estonian diplomat

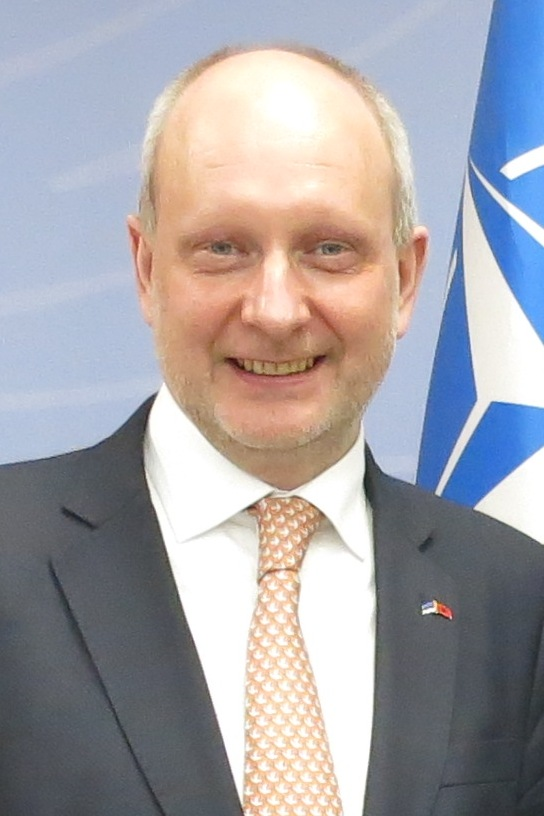

Personal details
- Born: 12 June 1967 (age 59) Tallinn, Estonia
- Education: University of Tartu (BA)

Matti Maasikas (born 12 June 1967) is an Estonian diplomat. He was the Head of the Delegation of the European Union to Ukraine (from September 2019 until summer 2023). Since 1 November 2024 he serves as the managing director for Europe at the EU External Action Service (EEAS).

== Biography ==
Maasikas was born on 12 June 1967 in Tallinn. In 1985, he graduated from the 4th Tallinn High School, and in 1993 from the Faculty of History of the University of Tartu.

From 1993 to 1994, he worked as the executive director of the National Museum of Estonia, and later as a consultant to the Estonian Ministry of Defence.

Since 2001, he has been working as a diplomat at the Estonian Foreign Ministry.

From 2001 to 2005, he was the Ambassador of Estonia to Finland.

From 2005 to 2008, he was Secretary General of the Estonian Ministry of Foreign Affairs.

Since August 2010, he has been on the team of advisers to the President of the Commission, José Manuel Barroso.

From 2011 to 2016, he was Permanent Representative of Estonia to the European Union. During Estonia's presidency of the Council of Europe, Maasikas was appointed as Estonia's Special Representative to the European Union.

From 2016 to 2019, he was the Deputy Minister of Foreign Affairs of Estonia for European Affairs. Matti Maasikas' personal signature is under one of the most important documents for Ukraine: in 2017, during the Estonian presidency of the EU Council, he, as a representative of the presidency, signed a decision to grant trade preferences to Ukraine.

In September 2019, he started to head the European Union Delegation to Ukraine, replacing Hugues Mingarelli, until resigning in the summer of 2023.

On 7 November 2019, he presented credentials to the President of Ukraine Volodymyr Zelenskyy.

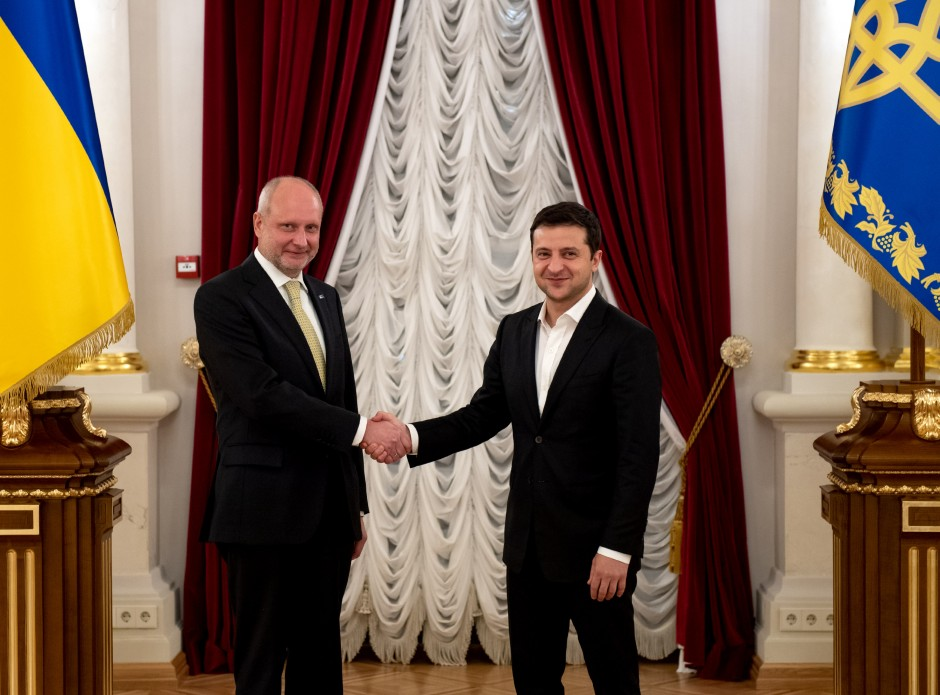
On November 7, 2019, EU Ambassador Matti Maasikas presented his credentials to President of Ukraine Volodymyr Zelenskyy

== Family ==
His father is Uno Maasikas, an Estonian journalist.

== Awards and honours ==
- 2016: Order of the White Star III class
- 2016: European of the Year

== See also ==
- List of ambassadors of the European Union
