= Kostiantyn Yelisieiev =

Ukrainian diplomat

Kostiantyn Yelisieiev Костянтин Петрович Єлісєєв
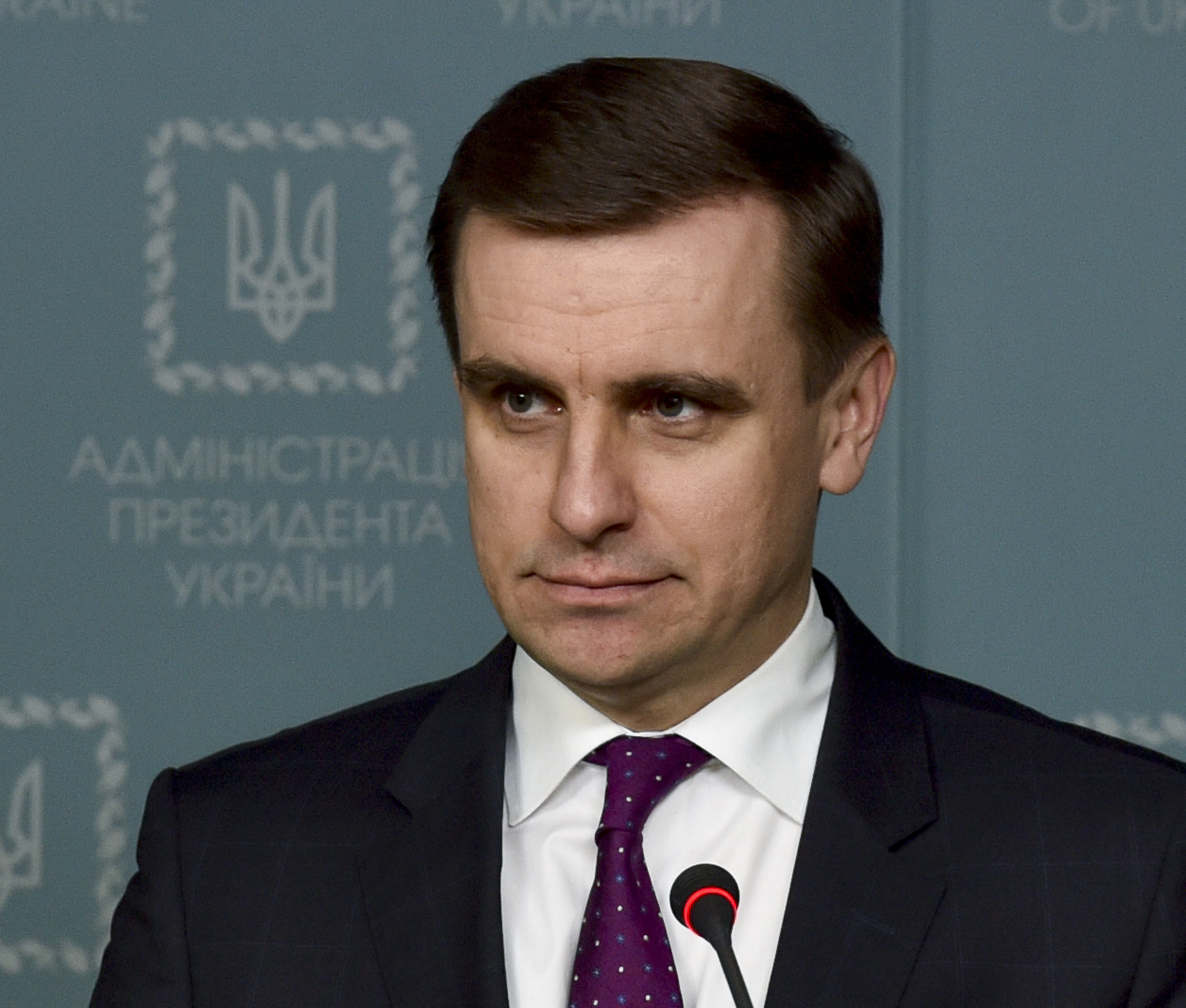

Ambassador of Ukraine to the European Union
- In office 2010–2015
- President: Viktor Yushchenko
- Preceded by: Andriy Veselovsky

Personal details
- Born: 14 September 1970 (age 56) Krasnoarmiysk, Donetsk region
- Education: Taras Shevchenko National University

Kostiantyn Yelisieiev (Ukrainian: Костянтин Петрович Єлісєєв; born September 14, 1970, Krasnoarmiysk, Donetsk region) is a Ukrainian diplomat. Ambassador Extraordinary and Plenipotentiary of Ukraine. He was deputy of head of Presidential Administration of Ukraine (2015).

== Education ==
Kostiantyn Yelisieiev graduated from Institute of International relations of Taras Shevchenko National University of Kyiv in 1992. He is fluent in French and English.

== Career ==
From 03.1992 to 01.1993 – He was Attaché of the Collegium Group of the Minister for Foreign Affairs of Ukraine.

From 01.1993 to 08.1993 – Attaché, Third Secretary, Directorate General for International Organizations of the Minister for Foreign Affairs of Ukraine.

From 08.1993 to 06.1994 – Third Secretary, Department for the United Nations political issuesand special bodies, Directorate General for International Organizations of the Minister for Foreign Affairs of Ukraine.

From 06.1994 to 09.1997 – Third, Second Secretary, Permanent Mission of Ukraine to the United Nations, New York City

From 09.1997 to 03.1999 – Second, First Secretary, Embassy of Ukraine, Paris.

From 03.1999 to 11.2000 – Senior Counselor, Directorate General for Foreign Policy, Administration of the President of Ukraine.

From 11.2000 to 01.2004 – director of the Cabinet of the Minister for Foreign Affairs of Ukraine.

From 01.2004 to 10.2007 – Deputy Representative of Ukraine to the European Union, Brussels

From 10.2007 to 06.2010 – Deputy Minister for Foreign Affairs of Ukraine.

From November 2007 – Appointed Head of the Ukrainian delegation to the negotiations with the European Union on the Associated Agreement

June 29, 2010-July 15, 2015 – Appointed to the post of Representative of Ukraine to the European Union.

May 13, 2013 - appointed Commissioner of Ukraine on foreign policy and integration processes

From July 15, 2015 - he was deputy of head of Presidential Administration of Ukraine.
