= Lublin Triangle =

Trilateral partnership in Eastern Europe

- Coat of arms

- Lublin Triangle countries EU or NATO countries
- Official languages: Lithuanian; Polish; Ukrainian
- Membership: Lithuania; Poland; Ukraine
- Establishment: 28 July 2020

Area
  - Total: 981,607 km^{2} (379,001 sq mi)

Population
  - 2022 estimate: ▲80,600,000
  - Density: 84/km^{2} (217.6/sq mi)
- GDP (PPP): 2022 estimate
  - Total: ▲$2.3 trillion
  - Per capita: ▲$28,000
- GDP (nominal): 2022 estimate
  - Total: ▲$1.0 trillion
  - Per capita: ▲$12,000
- Website; Official Website

The Lublin Triangle (Lithuanian: Liublino trikampis; Polish: Trójkąt Lubelski; Ukrainian: Люблінський трикутник, romanized: Liublinskyi trykutnyk) is a regional alliance of three European countries – Lithuania, Poland, and Ukraine – for the purposes of strengthening mutual military, cultural, economic and political cooperation and supporting Ukraine's integration into the European Union and NATO. The Lublin Triangle initiative invokes the integrative heritage of the 1569 Union of Lublin.

The Lublin Triangle countries declare their support for restoring Ukraine's territorial integrity within internationally recognized borders and call for an end to Russian aggression against Ukraine. The Lublin Triangle supports granting Ukraine the status of NATO enhanced partner and considers a NATO Membership Action Plan for Ukraine to be the next necessary step in that direction.

The tripartite format draws on the traditions and historic ties of the three countries. The pertinent joint declaration was adopted by the several ministers on 28 July 2020 in Lublin, Poland. Lublin was chosen in deliberate reference to the 1569 Union of Lublin that created the Polish–Lithuanian Commonwealth, then one of the largest countries in Europe.

== History ==
A joint declaration by the Foreign Ministers of Lithuania, Poland and Ukraine, Linas Linkevičius, Jacek Czaputowicz and Dmytro Kuleba, on the creation of the format was signed on 28 July 2020 in Lublin, Poland.

On 1 August 2020 the Minister for Foreign Affairs of Ukraine Dmytro Kuleba invited the Minister of Foreign Affairs of Belarus Vladimir Makei to the second meeting, which is to take place in Kyiv. During the Economic Forum in Karpacz, Poland, on 10 September 2020, Jan Hofmokl, Director of the Eastern Department of the Polish Foreign Ministry, stated that the Lublin Triangle should in fact be a square with Belarus. According to him, at the initial stage Minsk was interested in this political project, but later changed its mind.

On 17 September 2020 the first meeting (in the format of a video conference) of the national coordinators of the Lublin Triangle, created by the Foreign Ministers of Ukraine, Poland and Lithuania in July 2020, took place. Vasyl Bodnar (Ukraine), Marcin Przydacz (Poland) and Dalius Čekuolis (Lithuania), Deputy Foreign Ministers, have been appointed coordinators of this tripartite cooperation mechanism. The parties discussed preparations for the next meeting of the Foreign Ministers of the Lublin Triangle, which is to take place in Kyiv on the initiative of Minister Dmytro Kuleba. One of the main tasks of the Lublin Triangle should be to coordinate the actions of Ukraine, Poland and Lithuania to effectively counter the challenges and threats to common security, among which the priority is to counter hybrid threats from Russia.

On 29 January 2021, during the first online meeting of the Lublin Triangle, Ukrainian Foreign Minister Dmytro Kuleba stated at a briefing that Ukraine, Lithuania and Poland are in favor of Belarus joining the Lublin Triangle, but the time has not yet come.

"Of course, without Belarus, the Lublin Triangle is a bit incomplete. We would like, in the end, democratic Belarus to join and turn the "Lublin Triangle" into the Lublin "square". But the time for this has not yet come. At the same time, we all understand that the situation in Belarus has an impact not only on the country's bilateral relations with its neighbors, but also on the situation in the region as a whole." - Kuleba said, summing up the first meeting of the Lublin Triangle.

On 4 March 2021 the President of the Coordination Council of Belarus, Sviatlana Tsikhanouskaya, stated that she had received an invitation from Dmytro Kuleba to a meeting of the Lublin Triangle and was waiting for an invitation to an offline meeting with Kuleba and the Verkhovna Rada. Tsikhanouskaya noted that she wanted the "Lublin Triangle" to become the "Lublin Four".

On 5 October 2021, in the format of a round table within the framework of the Warsaw Security Forum, a meeting of the Foreign Ministers of the Lublin Triangle took place, in particular, Dmytro Kuleba stressed that the Lublin Triangle is a vivid example of a new trend in international politics for the creation of regional alliances:

The international agenda has been shaped by large international organizations and alliances for decades. The OSCE, the Council of Europe, NATO, the EU and the UN have structured the world order. Today, primarily as a result of Russia's aggressive actions, it is increasingly difficult for major alliances to maintain international peace and security. Therefore, flexible regional formats, such as the Lublin Triangle, are becoming increasingly important. This important regional format of cooperation already reveals the potential of our three countries, brings us closer and strengthens the security of Ukraine, Poland and Lithuania against the background of growing challenges in the region. The Weimar Triangle once helped Poland return to European politics. Today, the Lublin Triangle returns Ukraine to the space of Central Europe, to which it has always belonged historically.

Dmytro Kuleba stressed that the Lublin Triangle is enshrined in the recently approved Strategy of Ukraine's Foreign Policy as one of the important new international formats of cooperation between Ukraine. Together with the Association Trio, the Quadriga and the Crimea Platform, these new formats reflect Ukraine's new proactive foreign policy and aim to create a zone of security and prosperity for Ukraine and the Baltic and Black Sea region.

On 2 December 2021 the presidents of the Lublin Triangle held the first joint talks and adopted a statement calling on the international community to strengthen sanctions against the Russian Federation due to its ongoing aggression against Ukraine. The heads of state also demanded that the Kremlin withdraw Russian troops from Ukraine's borders and temporarily occupied territories. In a statement, the presidents reaffirmed their commitment to strengthening Europe's energy security and expressed concern over the Nord Stream 2 project. The leaders agreed to work together to counter Russia's attempts to monopolize the European gas market and use energy as a geopolitical weapon. The presidents also expressed mutual support amid the migration crisis on the EU's borders, artificially created by the Lukashenko regime.

On the eve of the large-scale Russian invasion of Ukraine, on 23 February 2022, the heads of states of the Lublin Triangle met in Kyiv, where they signed a joint declaration. It condemns the decision of the Russian Federation to recognize the temporarily occupied territories of Donetsk and Luhansk Oblasts as "independent", and also supports granting Ukraine the status of a candidate for EU membership.

On 26 November 2022 the prime ministers of the Lublin Triangle signed a joint statement based on the results of the meeting within the framework of the "Lublin Triangle" in Kyiv, in which they called on the international community to recognize the common goal of liberating the entire temporarily occupied territory of Ukraine. The document also talks about intensifying the process of negotiations regarding Ukraine's accession to NATO.

On 6 December 2022, during the EU - Ukraine Forum on Countering Disinformation held in Brussels, three non-governmental organisations from Lithuania, Poland, and Ukraine (the Civic Resilience Initiative, Kościuszko Institute and Detector Media respectively), presented a joint in-depth report highlighting the challenges resulting from Russian disinformation and propaganda activities in the Lublin Triangle countries. This report is the embodiment of the direct and close cooperation between the three partner states.

On 11 January 2023 the presidents of the states of the Lublin Triangle held a second summit in Lviv and signed a joint declaration. Polish President Andrzej Duda announced that Ukraine will receive a company of Leopard tanks as part of the creation of an international coalition.

On 28 June 2023, the Presidents of Poland, Lithuania, and Ukraine held a meeting in Kyiv to discuss strengthening NATO's presence on the Eastern Flank and support Ukraine's potential membership. President Duda emphasized “We are doing everything to make the Vilnius summit rich in decisions so that it causes improvement of the security in our part of Europe and a reliable perspective of Ukraine’s membership in the (North Atlantic) Alliance”. The leaders have previously met multiple times to affirm Ukraine's sovereignty and address concerns about the conflict.

== Mechanisms of co-operation ==
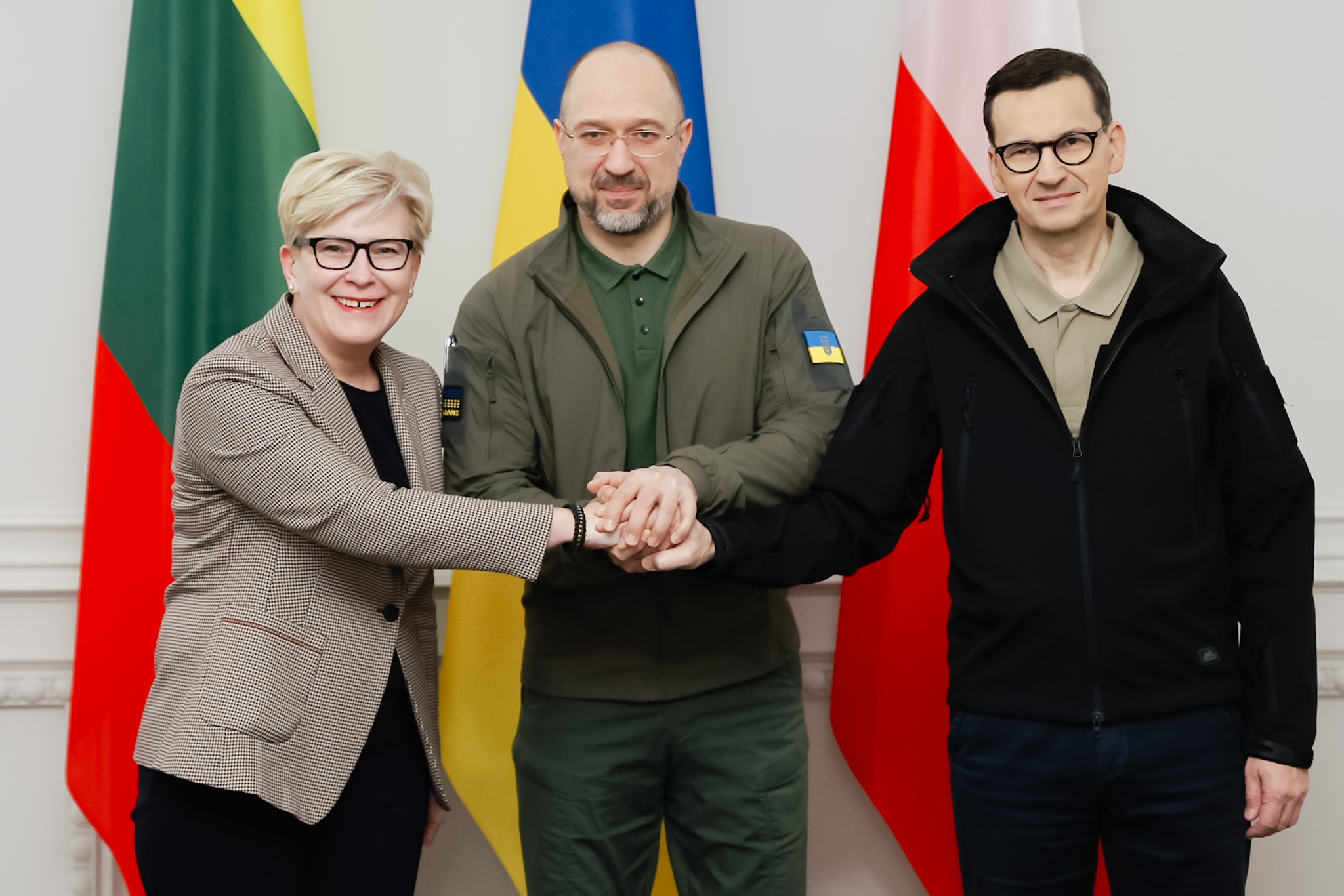
Meeting of prime ministers of Lublin Triangle in Kyiv, 26 November 2022

According to this Joint Declaration of Lithuania, Poland and Ukraine, the foreign ministers of the parties should hold regular meetings, in particular in the fields of multilateral activities, and with the participation of selected partners. They will also organize consultations at the level of the leadership of the Ministries of Foreign Affairs of their countries and create positions in these ministries on cooperation issues within the framework of the Lublin Triangle.

During the first videoconference meeting on 17 September 2020, the national coordinators identified the main activities of the Lublin Triangle and agreed to ensure sustainable interaction of the format at different working levels. During the meeting, they agreed on the basic principles of the Lublin Triangle and outlined plans for cooperation in the near future. One of the main tasks should be to coordinate the actions of the three states to effectively address the current challenges and threats to our common security. Among the priority topics in the cooperation is joint counteraction to hybrid threats from Russia, in particular in the fight against misinformation. The importance of maintaining close cooperation within international organizations was emphasized.

"We are united not only by common values and interests, but also by a common responsibility for the future of our countries and the region in which we live and which has been at the center of global politics in recent years." - Vasyl Bodnar said.

The Deputy Ministers also agreed to launch tripartite thematic consultations at the level of directors of the foreign ministries of the three countries. The coordinators paid important attention to the situation in Belarus and some other countries in the region. Vasyl Bodnar expressed his gratitude to the partners for their constant support for the territorial integrity and sovereignty of our state and support in counteracting Russian aggression. He also informed his colleagues about the main goals of the Crimean Platform and invited Poland and Lithuania to actively cooperate within the framework of the platform, which aims to deoccupy Crimea.

On 12 October 2020 the Prime Minister of Ukraine, Denys Shmygal, noted the importance of the newly created "Lublin Triangle" and invited Polish President Andrzej Duda to expand its format, namely to discuss the possibility of meeting of heads of government in the "Lublin Triangle" format during his visit to Ukraine.

On 27 February 2021, Lithuanian Foreign Minister Gabrielius Landsbergis told Ukrainian Radio Liberty that the Lublin Triangle initiative, which unites Ukraine, Lithuania and Poland, brings Ukraine closer to European integration:

"I think this format is very useful. And I'm sure that this format can be expanded, not just about politics. We could also discuss common history, geopolitics, economics and many other things. Such communication allows to structure our cooperation to a certain extent... It is, of course, very useful and brings Ukraine's European integration closer." - he said.

He also believes that the Crimean Platform initiative is "extremely useful not only for finding concrete solutions, but also to remind about the problem of the occupation of Crimea."

On 2 December 2021 Deputy Minister for Foreign Affairs of Ukraine, Mykola Tochytskyi, stated that although Ukraine and Poland demonstrate a high level of strategic partnership, Kyiv and Warsaw plan to further actively develop the Lublin Triangle. According to Tochytskyi, during the political consultations in Warsaw, the parties discussed a wide range of issues, including a complex history.

== Initiatives ==
Lithuanian–Polish–Ukrainian Brigade emblem

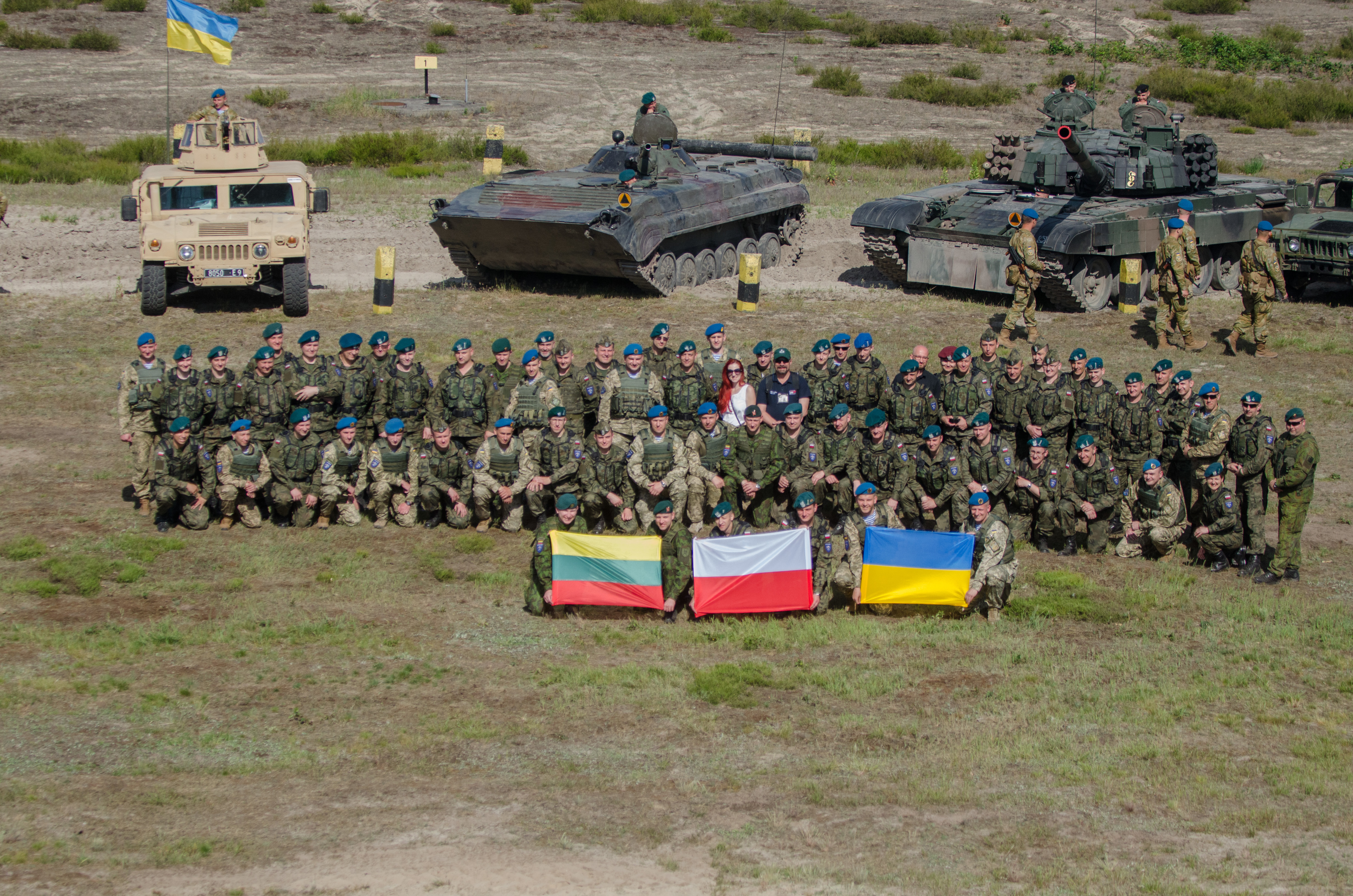
Soldiers of the LITPOLUKRBRIG at the opening ceremony of the "Anaconda-2016" exercise at the Nowa Dęba training ground in Poland, June 2016.

=== Interparliamentary Assembly ===
The Interparliamentary Assembly of the Verkhovna Rada of Ukraine, the Sejm and the Senate of the Republic of Poland and the Seimas of the Republic of Lithuania were established in 2005 to establish a dialogue between the three countries in the parliamentary dimension. The inaugural meeting of the Assembly took place on 16 June 2008 in Kyiv, Ukraine. Within the framework of the Assembly there are committees on European and Euro-Atlantic integration of Ukraine, humanitarian and cultural cooperation.

=== Lithuanian–Polish–Ukrainian Brigade ===
Lithuanian–Polish–Ukrainian Brigade is a multinational unit with capabilities of a general military brigade, designed for conducting independent military operations in accordance with international law or participating in such actions. It is composed of the three countries’ special military units selected from the 21st Podhale Rifleman Brigade (Poland), the 80th Airborne Assault Brigade (Ukraine), and the Grand Duchess Birute Uhlan Battalion (Lithuania).

Since 2016, LITPOLUKRBRIG has been an important element of NATO actions aimed at implementing NATO standards in Armed Forces of Ukraine. The brigade's main activities include training Ukrainian officers and military units in these standards, planning and conducting operational tasks, and maintaining operational readiness.

=== Youth Lublin Triangle ===
The Youth Lublin Triangle is an institutionalised platform for cooperation between the youth of Lithuania, Poland, and Ukraine. Initiated by the youth NGO Public Diplomacy Platform, the Youth Lublin Triangle has already received support from the Ministries of Foreign Affairs of Lithuania, Poland, and Ukraine.

The initiative is inspired by the study of the potential of youth cooperation under the auspices of the Lublin Triangle conducted by the Public Diplomacy Platform and funded by the Konrad Adenauer Stiftung.

The groundwork for the project was laid at the online forum held on 9–10 April 2021. The forum featured representatives of the youth councils of Lithuania, Ukraine, Poland, and Belarus, as well high-profile officials from Lithuania and Ukraine.

Based on close historical and cultural ties between the member states, the Youth Lublin Triangle has been created to ensure synergy between young people and prepare them for life in a prosperous and safe single European space. The areas of cooperation will include, among others, historical and cultural dialogue as well as professional and academic development.

== Country comparison ==
Name	Lithuania	Poland	Ukraine
Official name	Republic of Lithuania (Lietuvos Respublika)	Republic of Poland (Rzeczpospolita Polska)	Ukraine (Україна)
Coat of arms			
Flag	Lithuania	Poland	Ukraine
Population	▲2,794,329	▼38,383,000	▼41,660,982 (excluding Crimea and Sevastopol)
Area	65,300 km^{2} (25,200 sq mi)	312,696 km^{2} (120,733 sq mi)	603,628 km^{2} (233,062 sq mi)
Population Density	43/km^{2} (111.4/sq mi)	123/km^{2} (318.6/sq mi)	73.8/km^{2} (191.1/sq mi)
Government	Unitary semi-presidential constitutional republic	Unitary parliamentary constitutional republic	Unitary semi-presidential constitutional republic
Formation	16 February 1918 (Independence declared); 11 March 1990 (Independence restored)	11 November 1918 (Independence declared)	22 January 1918 (Independence declared); 24 August 1991 (Independence restored)
Capital	Vilnius – 588,412 (829,759 Metro)	Warsaw – 1,863,056 (3,100,844 Metro)	Kyiv – 2,950,800 (3,375,000 Metro)
Largest City	Vilnius – 588,412 (829,759 Metro)	Warsaw – 1,863,056 (3,100,844 Metro)	Kyiv – 2,950,800 (3,375,000 Metro)
Official language	Lithuanian (de facto and de jure)	Polish (de facto and de jure)	Ukrainian (de facto and de jure)
Current Head of Government	Prime Minister Mindaugas Sinkevičius (Social Democratic; 2026–present)	Prime Minister Donald Tusk (Civic Platform; 2023–present)	Prime Minister Serhii Koretskyi (Independent; 2026–present)
Current Head of State	President Gitanas Nausėda (Independent; 2019–present)	President Karol Nawrocki (Law and Justice; 2025–present)	President Volodymyr Zelenskyy (Servant of the People; 2019–present)
Main religions	77.2% Roman Catholic, 4.1% Eastern Orthodox, 0.8% Old Believers, 0.6% Lutheran, 0.2% Reformed, 0.9% others	87.58% Roman Catholic, 7.10% Opting out of answer, 1.28% Other faiths, 2.41% Irreligious, 1.63% Not stated	67.3% Eastern Orthodox, 9.4% Greek Catholic, 0.8% Roman Catholic, 7.7% unspecified Christian, 2.2% Protestant, 1.0% Muslim, 0.4% Jewish, 0.1% Buddhist, 11.0% unaffiliated
Ethnic groups	84.2% Lithuanians, 7.1% Poles, 5.8% Russians, 1.2% Belarusians, 0.5% Ukrainians, 1.7% other	98% Poles, 2% other or undeclared	77.8% Ukrainians, 17.3% Russians, 0.8% Romanians and Moldovans, 0.6% Belarusians, 0.5% Crimean Tatars, 0.4% Bulgarians, 0.3% Hungarians, 0.3% Poles, 0.2% Greeks, 1.7% other
GDP (nominal)	▲$68,031 billion (2022) (86th); ▲$24,032 per capita (2022) (41st)	▲$716,305 billion (2022) (23rd); ▲$19,023 per capita (2022) (52nd)	▲$164.593 billion (2021) (57th); ▲$3,984 per capita (2021) (116th)
External debt (nominal)	47.3 % of GDP (2020)	57.5 % of GDP (2020)	60.8 % of GDP (2020)
GDP (PPP)	▲$130,670 billion (2022) (86th); ▲$46,159 (2022) (38th)	▲$1,599,249 trillion (2022) (22nd); ▲$42,466 per capita (2022) (41st)	▲$576.106 billion (2021) (40th); ▲$13,943 per capita (2021) (96th)
Currency	Euro (€) – EUR	Polish złoty (zł) – PLN	Ukrainian hryvnia (₴) – UAH
Human Development Index	0.882 very high 34th: 0.791 very high IHDI 31st	0.880 very high 35th: 0.813 very high IHDI 26th	0.779 high 74th: 0.728 high IHDI 45th

== See also ==
- Accession of Ukraine to the European Union
- Association Trio
- British–Polish–Ukrainian trilateral pact
- Community of Democratic Choice
- GUAM Organization for Democracy and Economic Development
- Intermarium
- Intermarium (region)
- Odesa Triangle
- Polish–Lithuanian–Ruthenian Commonwealth
- Post-Soviet states
- Three Seas Initiative
- Visegrád Group
