= Association Trio =

International organization

- Eastern Partnership (EaP): Association Trio; European Union; not part of Association Trio or EU Belarus suspended its EaP membership
- Membership: Georgia; Moldova; Ukraine
- Establishment: 17 May 2021

Area
  - Total: 707,091 km^{2} (273,009 sq mi)

Population
  - 2021 estimate: 50,537,490^{[a]} 47,493,009^{[b]}
- 1. Data including Russian-occupied territories.; 2. Data excluding Russian-occupied territories.

The Association Trio (Georgian: ასოცირებული ტრიო, romanized: asotsirebuli trio; Romanian: Trio Asociat; Ukrainian: Асоційоване тріо, romanized: asotsiiovane trio), also known as the Associated Trio, is a tripartite format for the enhanced cooperation, coordination, and dialogue between the Ministries of Foreign Affairs of Georgia, Moldova and Ukraine with the European Union on issues of common interest related to European integration, enhancing cooperation within the framework of the Eastern Partnership, and committing to the prospect of joining the European Union.

The participants of the format have expressed a clear position to obtain eventual membership in the European Union and reaffirm their commitment to further implement their respective Association Agreements with the EU. In this context, they recall that under Article 49 of the TEU, the countries of Georgia, Moldova, and Ukraine have a European perspective and can apply for membership in the European Union, provided that all the necessary criteria for EU membership are met.

Coordinating their actions, Georgia, Moldova and Ukraine seek to expand the possibilities of their Association Agreements, promote sectoral convergence with the EU (integration into the Digital Single Market, energy and customs union, ENTSO-E, and with the Schengen Area; transport cooperation, green course, justice and home affairs, strategic communications, health, security and defense) and gradually integrate into the European Single Market.

All three members of the Association Trio currently maintain free trade agreements with the EU through the Deep and Comprehensive Free Trade Area and are members of the Euronest Parliamentary Assembly.

In February–March 2022, in reaction to the 2022 Russian invasion of Ukraine, all three states submitted applications to join the EU within days of each other.

== History ==
A joint memorandum between the Foreign Ministers of Georgia, Moldova, and Ukraine (David Zalkaliani, Aureliu Ciocoi, and Dmytro Kuleba), initiated the creation of the format. It was signed on 17 May 2021, in Kyiv.

The Minister of Foreign Affairs of Ukraine, Dmytro Kuleba, stated that this initiative will help the three countries to move forward more effectively together through European integration:

The Associated Trio is our message that there is no alternative to European integration for our three partner countries, and there is no alternative for Europe either, because they must see our three countries as a serious project to ensure peace and prosperity in Europe. Ukraine, Georgia and Moldova have a special status of associate partners in our relations with the EU. We have all made our European choice, signed the Association Agreement, and we would, of course, like to become members of the EU in the future. Today we agreed to formalize this status and together continue to move towards European integration. We also demonstrate in this memorandum that Ukraine, Georgia and Moldova will actively work towards European integration, and together we will move towards successful solutions in this direction. Given that our countries are currently facing serious security challenges, we have agreed to develop the security direction in our joint work in order to maintain stability in our region.

According to him, the Associated Trio includes three main elements: structuring consultations on European integration between the three foreign ministries, engaging in dialogue with European institutions and EU members, and coordinating the positions of countries within the Eastern Partnership.

In turn, the Minister of Foreign Affairs of Georgia, David Zalkaliani, said that Ukraine, Georgia and Moldova have a common goal of future EU membership and would like to restore unity with European countries:

Our priorities include expanding the Associated Trio's dialogue with the European Commission on cooperation in the digital transformation, the green economy, the transport sector and achieving maximum integration into the EU market through an in-depth Association Agreement, as well as deepening our cooperation with the EU.

While the Minister of Foreign Affairs and European Integration of the Republic of Moldova, Aureliu Ciocoi, said that by signing the memorandum the three countries reaffirmed their European intentions, great interest in the ambitious goals of the Eastern Partnership and are ready to contribute.

On 18 May 2021, in Brussels, the representative of the EU diplomatic service, Peter Stano, stated that the European Union respects and shares the commitment to the European integration of Ukraine, Georgia and Moldova, which created the so-called "Associated Trio":

The European Union recognizes the European aspirations and European choice of associate partners - Georgia, the Republic of Moldova and Ukraine. These countries are close neighbors of the EU and partners in the Eastern Partnership. All our neighbors are sovereign and independent. We respect their choice, foreign policy priorities and strategic goals, including the signing of a memorandum between them on strengthening cooperation in the field of European integration. The European Union is supporting each of these countries in their reform and transformation processes, investing significant time, financial and technical assistance to deliver tangible benefits and improve the lives of their citizens. We are focused on the full implementation of our respective association agreements in order to take full advantage of their opportunities.

== Members ==
Members of the Eastern Partnership

Members of the Eastern Partnership belonging to the Association Trio:

- Georgia
- Moldova
- Ukraine

Other members of the Eastern Partnership not belonging to the Association Trio:

- Armenia
- Azerbaijan
- Belarus (Belarus announced a suspension of its participation in the Eastern Partnership on 28 June 2021)

== Mechanisms of cooperation ==
In accordance with the common interests of their European integration, the participants will cooperate to enhance their political association and economic integration with the EU, as stipulated by the three respective Association Agreements, and promote new opportunities within the Eastern Partnership. The participants believe that the significant potential of further development of their states' integration with the EU requires that the tools and areas of cooperation correspond to the needs and capabilities of the "Association Trio", providing them with more opportunities of enhanced political dialogue, as well as, greater economic integration.

The participants are confident that the process of their European integration will further benefit from the incentive-based approach ("more for more") aimed to set progressive benchmarks of the integration process and provide for tangible achievements for their societies. The participants' contribution to the cooperation within the Eastern Partnership will be without prejudice to their bilateral cooperation with the EU, in line with their European aspirations. The participants underline the importance of EU support to the partners' sovereignty and territorial integrity within their internationally recognized borders, as well as, to strengthening their resilience and countering security challenges. The participants will continue working towards strengthening the EU's role in advancing peaceful resolution of conflicts within relevant formats and platforms.

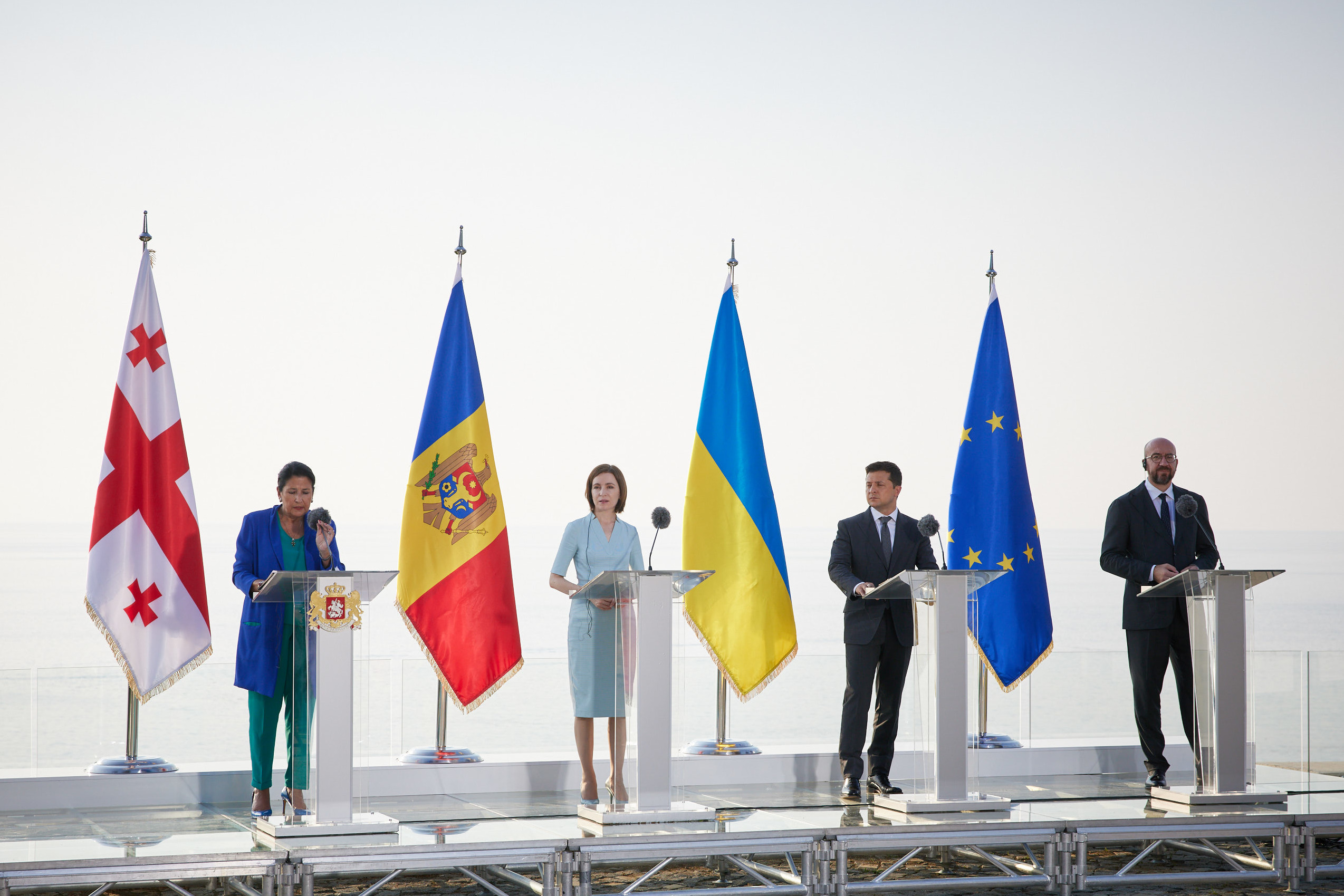
President of Georgia Salome Zourabichvili, President of Moldova Maia Sandu, President of Ukraine Volodymyr Zelenskyy and President of the European Council Charles Michel during the 2021 Batumi International Conference.

Taking into account ambitious and complex European-oriented reform agenda of the "Association Trio", the participants recognize the crucial role of EU assistance, in particular through dedicated financial instruments, corresponding to the level of their commitments and goals and in line with the principle of conditionality in relation to the progress in reforms.

=== Initiatives ===
Guided by the goal of deepening their European integration process, as well as, willing to ensure further strategic development of the Eastern Partnership, the participants agreed to promote joint dialogues with EU institutions and EU members states, in the following areas:

- Expanding the agenda of the dialogues between the European Commission and the "Association Trio", in addition to the DCFTA related issues, to new thematic areas for enhanced cooperation, such as transport, energy, digital transformation, green economy, justice and home affairs, strategic communications, healthcare;
- Looking beyond the DCFTA framework and allocating additional tools to facilitate the integration of the "Association Trio" into the EU Internal Market;
- Enhancing security and defense cooperation with the EU with special focus on countering hybrid threats, strengthening cyber resilience, developing cooperation platforms with the EU Hybrid Fusion Cell and EU Cyber Security Agency, participation in CSDP missions and operations, as well as, participation in the EU Permanent Structured Cooperation (PESCO) projects;
- Promoting further engagement of the "Association Trio" in the EU framework programs and agencies;
- Supporting mobilization of the EU robust assistance to uphold complex reforms by the "Association Trio" and ensuring their access to alternative funds and resources at the EU's disposal, including for implementation of the projects of common interest;
- Coordinating joint efforts within the Eastern Partnership, based on European aspirations and common needs of the Association Trio.

=== Methods of cooperation ===
As per the present memorandum, the participants agree to strengthen their cooperation by the following means:

- Conducting regular and/or ad-hoc trilateral consultations to review ongoing developments or discuss specific issues in the framework of their integration with the EU;
- Establishing "Association Trio" coordinators within the respective Ministries of Foreign Affairs;
- Holding "Association Trio" coordination meetings on expert, senior official, and ministerial levels ahead of important events of the Eastern Partnership;
- Undertaking joint diplomatic demarches to the EU institutions and the EU member states on jointly agreed issues related to their European aspirations, common initiatives of their European integration, as well as, cooperation within the Eastern Partnership;
- Conducting coordinated public communication on the common approaches related to the European aspirations of the "Association Trio", including expert events and publications;
- Developing new dialogue platforms with regional initiatives involving EU member states, aimed at mobilization of support to the Trio's European aspirations.

== Trio + 1 ==
In December 2019, following the eighth plenary meeting of the Euronest Parliamentary Assembly, a resolution was passed by all members outlining various EU integration goals to be achieved by 2030. The resolution highlights the importance of the Eastern Partnership program and how the initiative supports the six EU associated countries in letting them move more rapidly with reform implementation and deeper political and economic integration with the EU. The resolution coined the term "Trio + 1" which represents the three Association Agreements established with Georgia, Moldova and Ukraine, and the CEPA established with Armenia. The resolution calls for promoting further integration efforts between the EU and the "Trio + 1" group over the next decade.

== Prospect of EU membership ==
Current members Candidates negotiating Candidates Applicants Candidates with frozen negotiations

As of January 2021, Georgia and Ukraine were preparing to formally apply for EU membership in 2024 to join the European Union in the 2030s. However, the 2022 Russian Invasion of Ukraine sped up this timetable and led Ukraine, Georgia, and Moldova, to all apply for membership in February–March 2022.

In April 2014, the European Parliament noted that in accordance with Article 49 of the Treaty on European Union, Georgia, Moldova and Ukraine, like any other European country, have a European perspective and can apply for EU membership in accordance with the principles of democracy. In March 2024, the European Parliament also confirmed that Armenia (which belongs to the broader Trio+1 group of countries) met the Article 49 requirements, and could apply for EU membership.

== See also ==
- Community for Democracy and Rights of Nations
- Community of Democratic Choice
- Eastern Partnership
- Euronest Parliamentary Assembly
- European Neighbourhood Policy
- EU Strategy for the South Caucasus
- Georgia–European Union relations
- GUAM Organization for Democracy and Economic Development
- Lublin Triangle
- Moldova–European Union relations
- Odesa Triangle
- Politics of Europe
- Potential enlargement of the European Union
- Three Seas Initiative
- Ukraine–European Union relations
