= Black Sea Forum for Partnership and Dialogue =

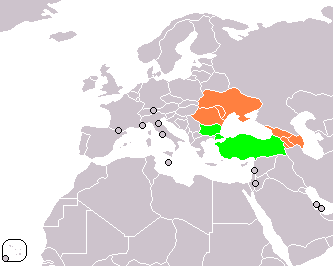
Black Sea Forum member states members observers

The inaugural session of the Black Sea Forum for Partnership and Dialogue (BSF) was held on June 4–6, 2006 in Bucharest. The Forum is a Romanian initiative, initially meant to hold annual presidential-level summits (the venues rotating among participant countries) and thematic or sectoral-cooperation meeting during those annual intervals. The Forum is not meant to create new regional institutions, but rather to turn into a regular consultative process among countries of the extended Black Sea region (defined as including the South Caucasus to the Caspian Sea) and between this group of countries and international organizations such as the European Union. After the inaugural summit, no other summits were planned.

After Romania and Bulgaria joined the EU, the Forum may become an EU initiative for cooperation with the Black and Caspian Sea states similar to the Northern Dimension initiative for the Nordic countries and Baltic Sea states.

== Membership ==
Presidents Traian Băsescu of Romania, Vladimir Voronin of Moldova, Viktor Yushchenko of Ukraine, Mikheil Saakashvili of Georgia, Robert Kocharyan of Armenia, Ilham Aliyev of Azerbaijan, a State Minister from Turkey and a representative of Bulgaria signed a Joint Declaration at the inaugural session of the BSF. They were joined by senior officials from the United States, NATO, and the EU.

Members

- Armenia
- Azerbaijan
- Georgia
- Moldova
- Romania
- Ukraine

Observers

- Bulgaria
- Turkey

== History ==
The Black Sea Forum for Dialogue and Partnership is an inclusive and transparent process of reflection about the region, its identity and its future, bringing together all contributing actors with a view to fostering synergy, enhance confidence building and facilitate achievable regional projects that address genuine regional needs. Such a process is based upon an active and open-ended dialogue among state bureaucracies and civil societies of regional countries, as well as with institutions, governments and academia of the Euro-Atlantic community. The Black Sea Forum is not just another seminar about the Black Sea region, but rather a process of refined interaction at various levels, led and owned by the countries in the region with the support and contribution of the European and Euro-Atlantic community.

The aim of the Forum is to create an overarching platform of engagement within and with the region, in order to forge a regional vision and a common mind-set and to shape coordinating structures based on that common vision. The ultimate aim is to transform the entire region into a zone of secure sovereign countries, sharing viable market economies, enjoying open and responsive systems of government, and to maintain strong links and interdependencies with the Euro-Atlantic community, with the prospect of further extending and consolidating the area of freedom, security and stability on the whole shore of the Black Sea and beyond.

On 5 June 2006, Bucharest hosted the summit launching the Black Sea Forum for Dialogue and Partnership that brought together Heads of State and Government, Ministers and other high representatives of the Black Sea countries, as well as senior officials of the European Union and NATO, European countries and the United States, regional and international organisations. The Forum was also attended by representatives of NGOs, think-tanks, academic and research institutions, the civil society and business associations and companies from the region and the Euro-Atlantic community.

== Joint Declaration of the Black Sea Forum for Dialogue and Partnership ==
Adopted at the Bucharest Summit, 5 June 2006

We, Heads of State or Their Representatives from the Black Sea region: Republic of Armenia, Republic of Azerbaijan, Republic of Bulgaria, Georgia, Hellenic Republic, Republic of Moldova, Romania, Turkey and Ukraine;

Considering the far-reaching democratic transformation process currently under way in the Black Sea Region, and its growing relevance in a globalised world, where increasing interdependence requires a new impetus to be given to regional cooperation, in line with the UN principles;

Recalling the experience acquired from regional cooperation in South Eastern and Central Europe, the Baltic Sea and Northern Europe, which generated enhanced confidence among participating countries;

Acknowledging that existing regional initiatives, processes and structures have so far fostered closer cooperation in the region and encouraged the participating countries to seek regional answers to their common challenges;

Affirming the conviction that the States in the Black Sea Region should continue to uphold their responsibility for maintaining peace, stability, prosperity and good neighbourly relations in the Black Sea area, by utilizing effectively and efficiently all available organisations (BSEC), initiatives and processes in the area, contributing to democratic transformation and sustainable development;

Emphasising that the evolving common security challenges in the region, such as those pertaining to energy, terrorism and WMD proliferation, environmental degradation, natural disasters, illegal trafficking, organised crime require correlated and cooperative responses of the countries in the region;

Stressing that unresolved conflicts in some Black Sea states represent a challenge to security and stability in the region;

Recognising that a reinforced strategy of an action-oriented nature, which will build upon the existing regional cooperation initiatives and make use of all other relevant mechanisms and programmes, as well as the contribution of interested parties in a complementary fashion, is needed to effectively deal with these common challenges;

I. Hereby announce the launching of the Black Sea Forum for Dialogue and Partnership, a process that will serve as a regional platform designed primarily to define a common vision of democratic and sustainable development. The Forum will thus help consolidate regional commonalities, through providing new ideas and proposals for an intensified dialogue and cooperation within the Black Sea region, based on good neighbourly relations and effective partnerships, while taking full account of the existing regional and international endeavours that can be of assistance in the pursuit of this fundamental objective. The Forum will therefore provide an inclusive, flexible and open framework for generating new ideas, channeling and mobilising governmental and nongovernmental, regional and international efforts and resources in the pursuit of these goals.

II. Agree that, in order to achieve the objectives of the Forum, the following areas of cooperation will be given priority:

a) Fostering greater synergy among international and regional organisations to create political preconditions for the success of regional cooperation projects; shaping a common vision and setting a common agenda;

b) Promoting good governance, strengthening of tolerance and non-discrimination, civil society capacity-building, empowerment of the youth through provision of better education and research opportunities, with a view to creating a regional environment conducive to the promotion of democracy and fundamental rights and freedoms;

c) Identifying regional means and capabilities that can be mobilised to ensure sustainable development through a more effective regional cooperation, and highlighting the role and active involvement of the business community to this end;

d) Encouraging regional cooperation by pooling relevant national experiences and best practices, in crisis management, civil emergency planning, post-conflict reconstruction and environmental protection, putting regional priorities in conjunction with European and Euro-Atlantic developments in these areas;

III. Agree that, in the future, we may decide on the inclusion of further priority areas for consideration within the context of the Black Sea Forum;

IV. Welcome the increasing interest of the EU in the Black Sea region and take note with appreciation of the recent initiatives undertaken by EU member states, resulting in the undergoing efforts within the EU to elaborate a comprehensive regional approach for the Black Sea, which should significantly contribute towards achieving the goals we all share. In this context, we encourage the EU member states and the European Commission to make full use of their policy and financial instruments available for the region from 2007 onwards, including the European Neighbourhood Policy, the European Neighbourhood Policy Instrument (ENPI) and the Instrument for Pre-Accession (IPA). We also welcome the involvement of development, financial and cultural partners in the Black Sea region.

V. Decide on the following principles and guidelines of the Forum:

a) The Forum will have no permanent structures or bodies and it will not duplicate the activities of the existing mechanisms of cooperation in the region. The operational framework will be flexible and minimal, based notably on networks and partnerships. The envisaged cooperation among the participating countries will stem from intergovernmental interaction, public–private partnerships, cross-national projects and interdisciplinary academic expertise.

b) Consultations will continue, as and when required, in an effort to explore ways and means of further enhancing the contribution of the Forum to the regional cooperation including through the existing mechanisms.

c) The Forum is open to the participation of every state in the region, as well as other interested partner organisations and states. Particular attention shall be given to engaging the representatives of regional and sub regional organisations and initiatives. The Forum will facilitate increased communication and interaction among regional stakeholders, state and non-governmental actors alike.

d) Cooperation with the EU institutions for the implementation of proposals discussed within the Forum would be sought and based on the added value of these proposed projects to existing and future EU instruments, bearing in mind wider regional needs and considerations.

e) The responsibility for the implementation of agreed projects (coordination, format of meetings, identification of donors and facilitators, etc.) that are not funded by the EU in the framework of the Forum lies mainly with the initiating country/countries.

== See also ==
- Black Sea Economic Co-operation (BSEC)
- Black Sea trade and economy
- Community for Democracy and Rights of Nations
- Community of Democratic Choice (CDC)
- Eastern Partnership
- Euronest Parliamentary Assembly
- GUAM Organization for Democracy and Economic Development (GUAM)
- Politics of Europe
- Southeast European Cooperation Process (SEECP)
