= Moldova–Ukraine relations =

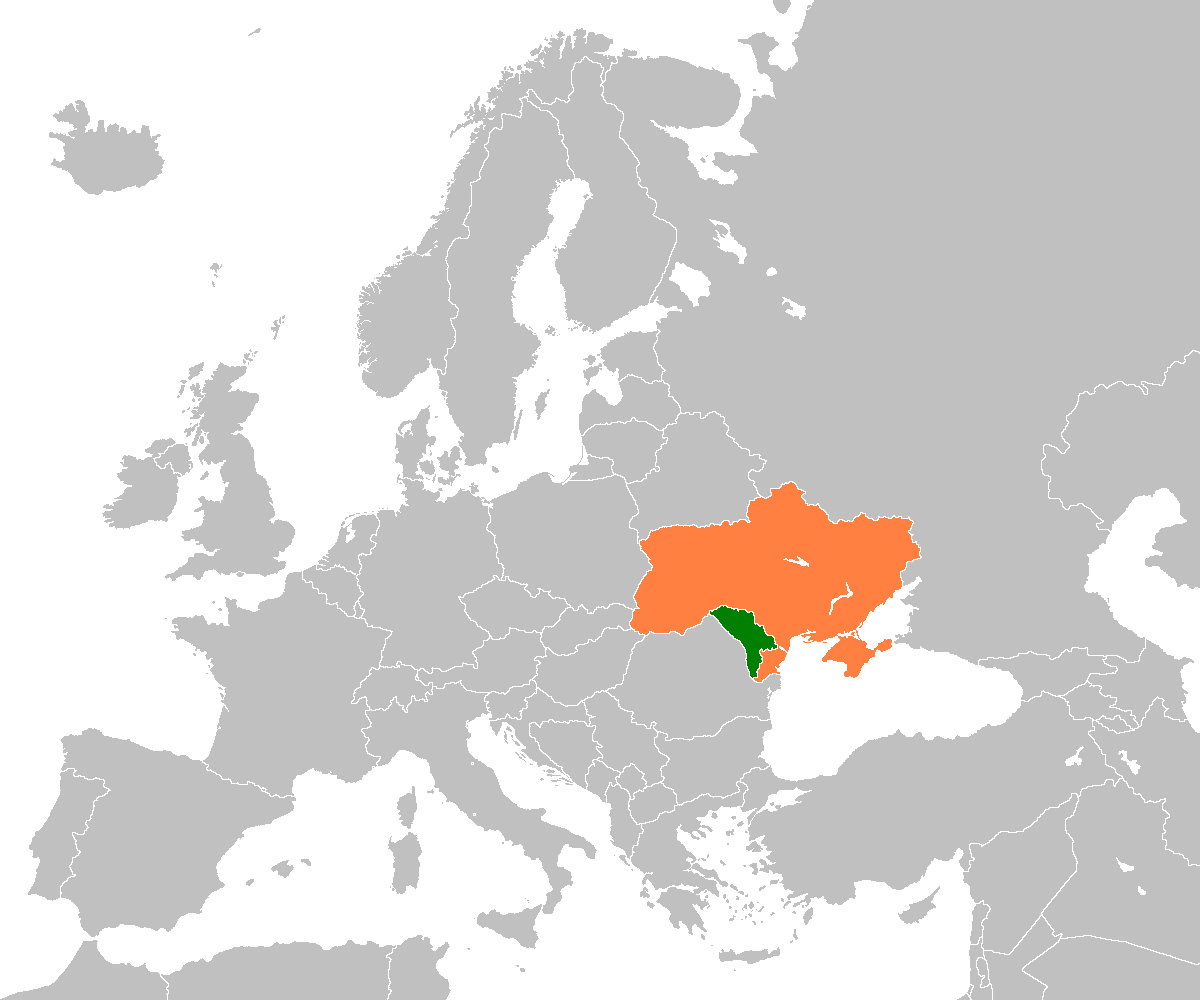

- Moldova: Ukraine

Moldova–Ukraine relations are the bilateral/diplomatic/foreign relations between the sovereign states of Moldova and Ukraine. The Moldova–Ukraine border is 985 kilometers (612 miles). Ukrainians are the third largest ethnic group in Moldova, behind Moldovans and Romanians. Both countries were former republics of the Soviet Union and are also the poorest countries in Europe. Both countries have applied for membership to join the European Union in 2022.

== History ==
=== Early contacts ===
Close cooperation between the Central Rada of the Ukrainian People's Republic and the Sfatul Țării of the Moldavian Democratic Republic in November–December 1917 was evidenced by the fact that the first meeting of the Moldovan Parliament was held on November 21, 1917 in Chișinău under the protection of "national Moldavian and Ukrainian troops." After the declaration of the independent Ukrainian People's Republic, its government, defining the state borders, paid special attention to that with Moldova.

=== Soviet era ===
Moldavian SSR–Ukrainian SSR relations
- Moldavian SSR: Ukrainian SSR

Ukrainian-Moldovan scientific relations reached a new level after the creation in 1946 of the Academy of Sciences of Moldova, as it was during this period that the connection between the Academy of Sciences of the Ukrainian SSR, allowed for the strengthening of Moldovan-Ukrainian cultural and scientific ties. In the 1980s, the efforts of Moldovan and Ukrainian ethnologists prepared the scientific collection "Ukrainian-Moldovan Relations in the Period of Socialism", which included developments in the history of Moldovans in Ukraine and Ukrainians in Moldova.

=== Post-independence ===
Ukraine recognized the independence of the Republic of Moldova on December 21, 1991. Diplomatic relations between the Republic of Moldova and Ukraine were established on March 10, 1992. The first official visit of the President Leonid Kravchuk to Moldova took place on October 23, 1992. During the visit of the "Treaty of Good Neighborliness, Friendship and Cooperation between Ukraine and the Republic of Moldova" was signed.

In 2001, the two countries founded the Organization for Democracy and Economic Development (GUAM), along with Georgia and Azerbaijan.

=== 21st century and Transnistria conflict ===
Ukraine, step by step after 2005, conceded several important economic privileges to Moldova. Kyiv accepted gas delivery to Moldova for the account of the Ukrainian share in the beginning of 2006 and electricity delivery at low tariffs. Ukraine has also accepted the introduction of the monitoring commission of the European Union at the Ukrainian-Moldovan border, as well as implementation of the unified customs procedure for the Transnistrian part of the Moldovan border. Ukraine opened its alcohol market for Moldovan production when Russia imposed a ban on it.

Nevertheless, certain areas remain with unsolved problems. Since 2006 Moldovan authorities have not delivered to Aerosvit the authorisation to operate daily flights to Chișinău. The rail transport remains an important issue, as Ukraine is constructing a new railway line to deviate from the problematic Transnistrian sector, with its frequent blocks of railway transportation. Moldova has not yet transferred to Ukraine the Odesa–Reni highway section, as well as bordering property in the region of Palanca.

Palanca is a marshy area that could become a Vennbahn-type enclave of Moldova surrounded by Ukraine. Under a 2001 treaty between the two nations, Moldova is to transfer to Ukraine not only the asphalt (as it has already done), but also the real property under 7.7 kilometers (4¾ miles) of road (which is a portion of the 300 km; 200 mile road between Odesa and Reni), and to clarify the sovereignty of that land, which under that treaty is to be transferred to Ukraine.

The situation remains unresolved with one block of the Cuciurgan power station, as it considered to be on Moldovan territory today for unclear reasons, or at least contested by Ukraine. The construction of the oil terminal in Giurgiulesti is strongly contested by Ukraine for the ecological threat it represents to the Danubian region of Ukraine. Ukraine had transferred 400 meters (yards) of the Ukrainian bank of the Danube to Moldova in 1997, in order to make the construction of the terminal possible.

=== Relations under Dodon ===
Moldovan–Ukrainian relations deteriorated under Moldovan President Igor Dodon due to his pro-Russian policies. Despite this, the government maintained cordial relations with Kyiv, with Prime Minister of Moldova Pavel Filip holding a phone call with his Ukrainian counterpart Volodymyr Groysman a month after Dodon's election, during which he confirmed that Moldova stands for the preservation of the sovereignty of Ukraine.

In January 2017, Dodon stated that Moldova would not officially recognize the annexation of Crimea by Russia as legal, reneging on statements he made to the contrary in October 2016 on the issue, stressing his position that "we need to build friendships with Ukraine". Despite this, in September of that year, Ukrainian Ambassador Ivan Hnatyshyn stated that he does not expect a visit to (Ukrainian capital) Kyiv by Dodon because he "doesn’t respect the territorial integrity of my country", and President Petro Poroshenko declared that he would only agree to meet with Dodon only after he officially recognizes that the Crimea is Ukrainian territory.

=== Election of Maia Sandu and warming of ties ===
This changed with the election of pro-European Maia Sandu in 2020.

She visited Kyiv in January 2021 in her first foreign trip as president, meeting with President Volodymyr Zelenskyy, where they agreed to create a Presidential Council to address issues of bilateral relations.

On 24 February 2022, President Sandu condemned the Russian invasion of Ukraine as a "a blatant breach of international law and of Ukrainian sovereignty and territorial integrity", adding that "we will help people who need our help and support."

On 26 June 2026, Andrii Sybiha, the Minister of Foreign Affairs of Ukraine, announced that Ukraine had included Moldova in its list of countries from which it accepted dual citizenship. Sybiha described this move as "a strategic step of Ukraine towards the Republic of Moldova". With this change, ethnic Ukrainians from Moldova would become able to become Ukrainian citizens through a simplified procedure. Romania had been included on this list earlier on 8 May that year.

== State and official visits ==
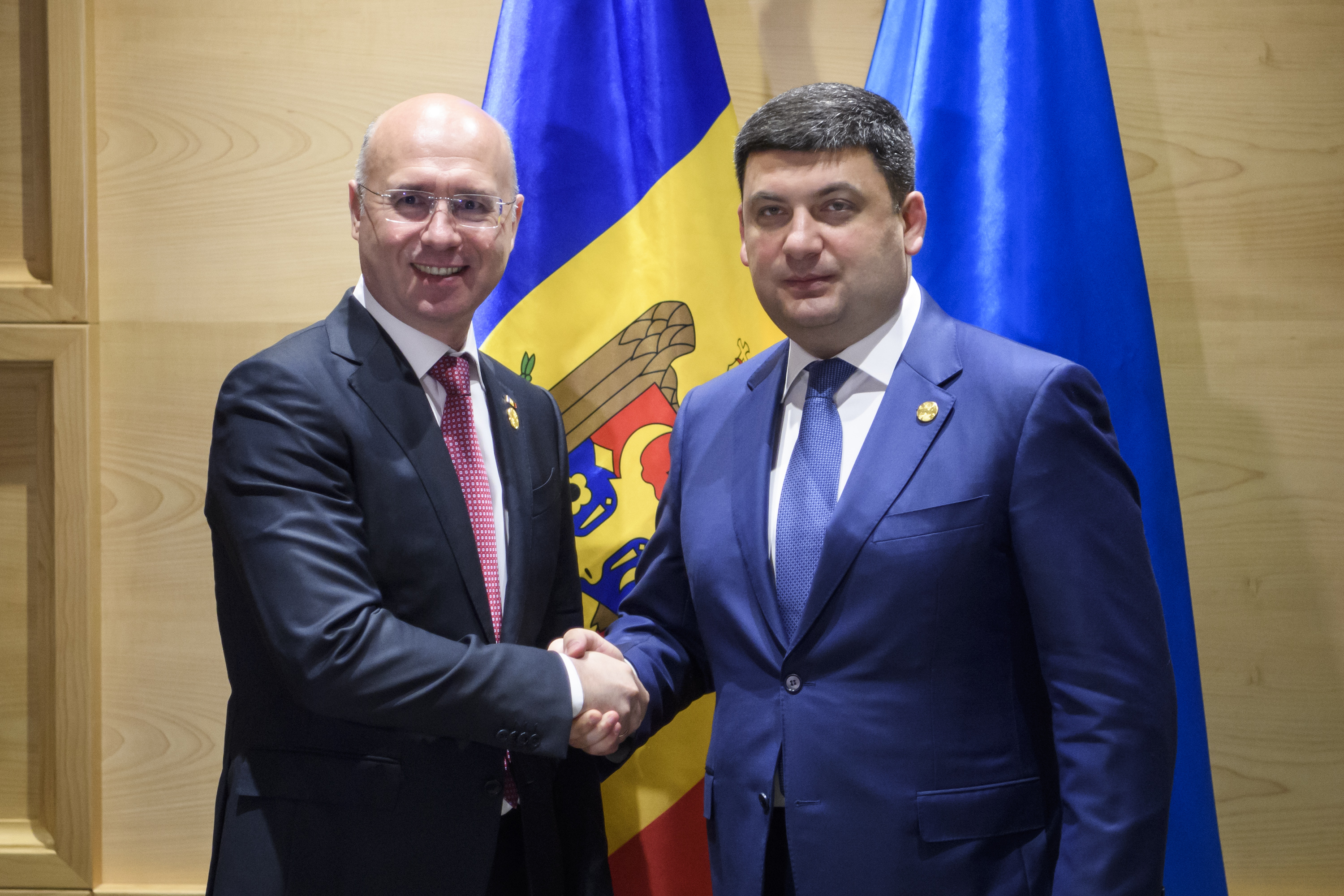
Pavel Filip and Volodymyr Groysman, 2018

Guest	Host	Place of visit	Date of visit	Notes
(Ukraine) President Leonid Kravchuk	(Moldova) President Mircea Snegur	Chișinău	October 23, 1992	
(Moldova) President Mircea Snegur	(Ukraine) President Leonid Kravchuk	Kyiv	December 13–14, 1993	
(Moldova) President Vladimir Voronin	(Ukraine) President Leonid Kuchma	Kyiv	May 2001	
(Moldova) President Nicolae Timofti	(Ukraine) President Viktor Yanukovych	Kyiv	July 2013	
(Ukraine) President Petro Poroshenko	(Moldova) President Nicolae Timofti	Chișinău and Bălți	November 2014	
(Moldova) President Maia Sandu	(Ukraine) President Volodymyr Zelenskyy	Kyiv	January 2021	
(Moldova) President Maia Sandu	(Ukraine) President Volodymyr Zelenskyy	Kyiv	August 24, 2021	Took part in Independence Day celebrations.
(Ukraine) President Volodymyr Zelenskyy	(Moldova) President Maia Sandu	Chișinău	August 27, 2021	Took part in Independence Day celebrations.
(Moldova) President Maia Sandu	(Ukraine) President Volodymyr Zelenskyy	Kyiv, Bucha, and Irpin	June 27, 2022	First meeting after the start of 2022 Russian invasion of Ukraine.
(Moldova) President Maia Sandu	(Ukraine) President Volodymyr Zelenskyy	Bucha	February 2023	Attended the 2023 Bucha Summit.
(Ukraine) President Volodymyr Zelenskyy	(Moldova) President Maia Sandu	Bulboaca, Anenii Noi	June 1, 2023	Met at the 2nd European Political Community Summit

== Resident diplomatic mission ==
- Moldova has an embassy in Kyiv and a consulate-general in Odesa.
- Ukraine has an embassy in Chișinău and a consulate in Bălți.
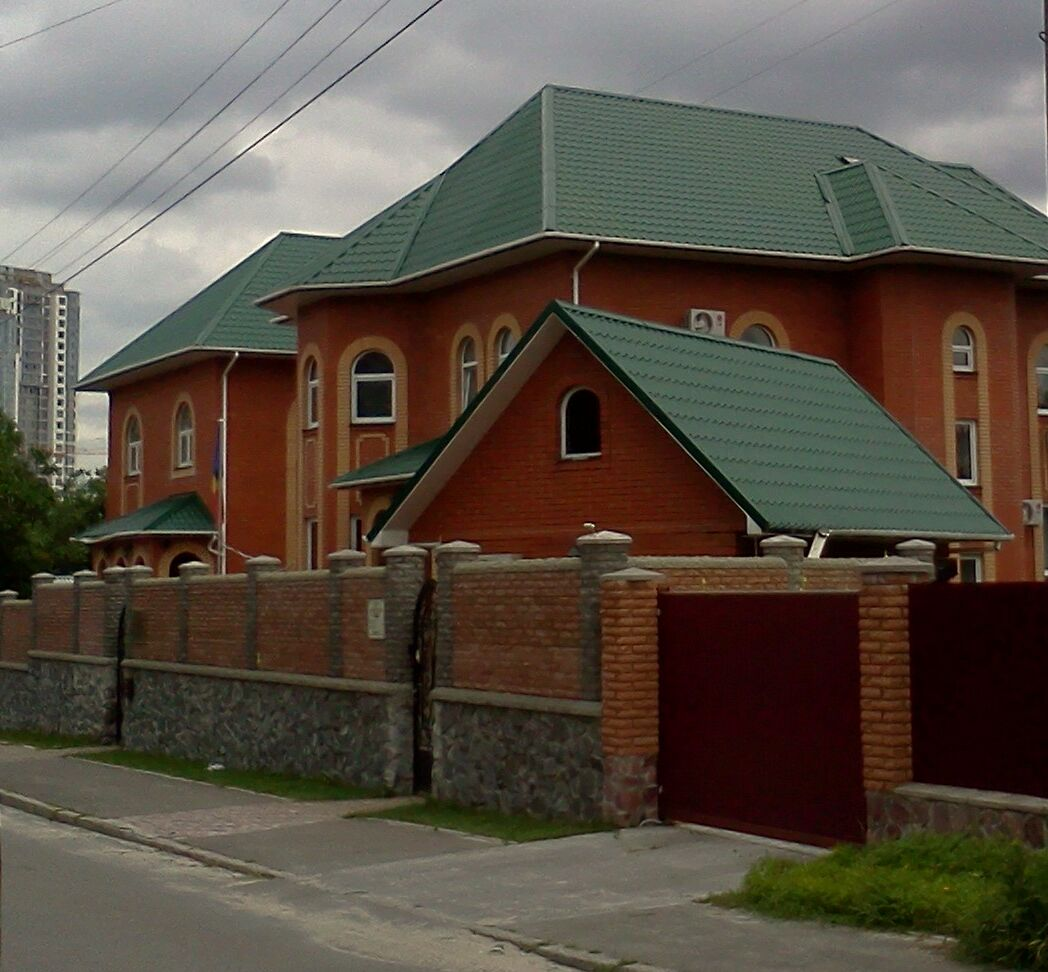
Embassy of Moldova in Kyiv

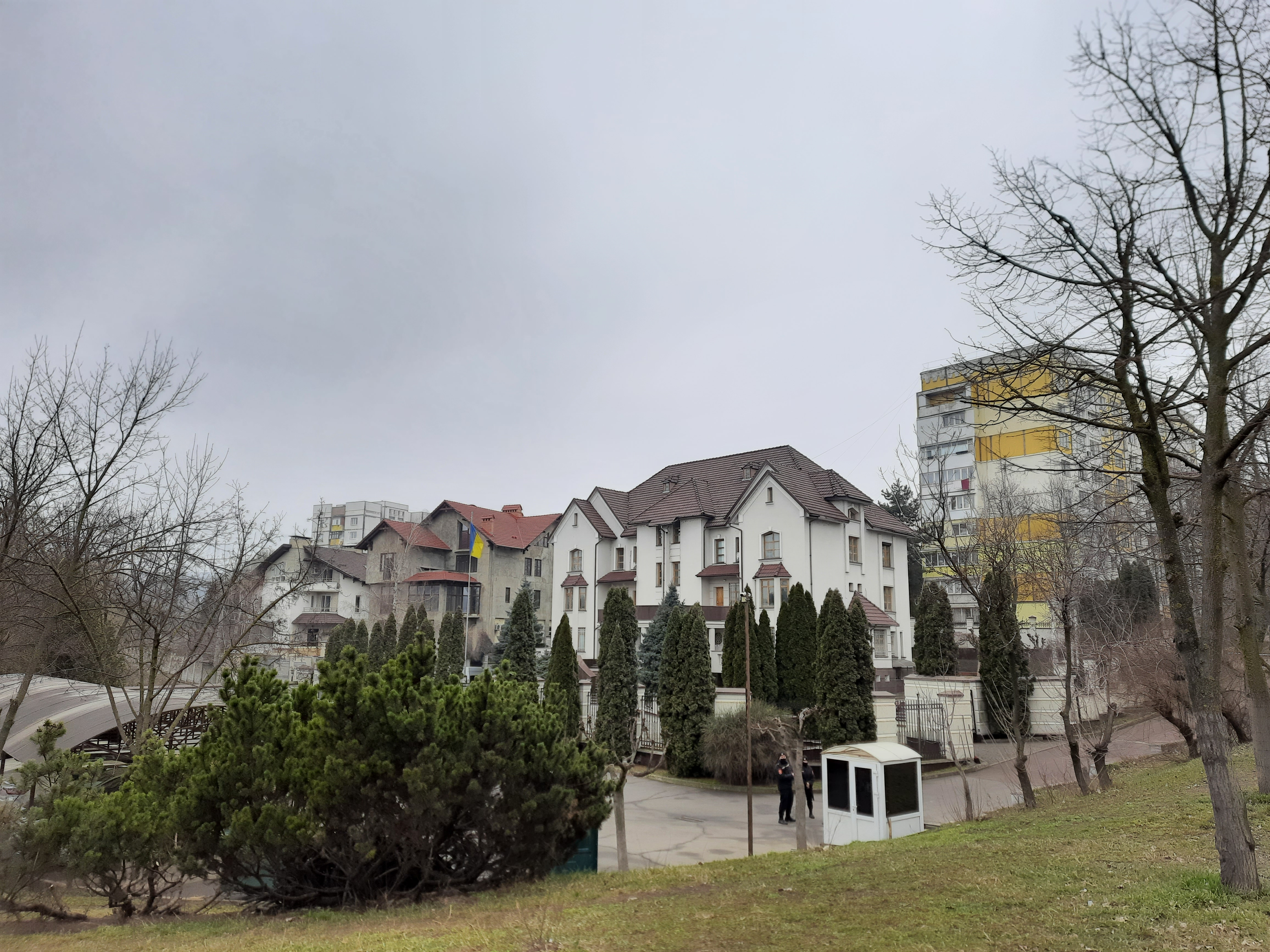
Embassy of Ukraine in Chișinău

== See also ==
- Foreign relations of Moldova
- Foreign relations of Ukraine
- Moldova–Ukraine border
- Transnistria–Ukraine relations
- Moldovans in Ukraine
- Ukrainians in Moldova
- Embassy of Ukraine in Moldova
- Moldova in the Eurovision Song Contest 2015
- Moldova–Russia relations
- Moldova–European Union relations
- Accession of Moldova to the European Union
- Ukraine–European Union relations
- Accession of Ukraine to the European Union
- Moldova–NATO relations
- Ukraine–NATO relations
- Odesa Triangle
