= Transnistria–Ukraine relations =

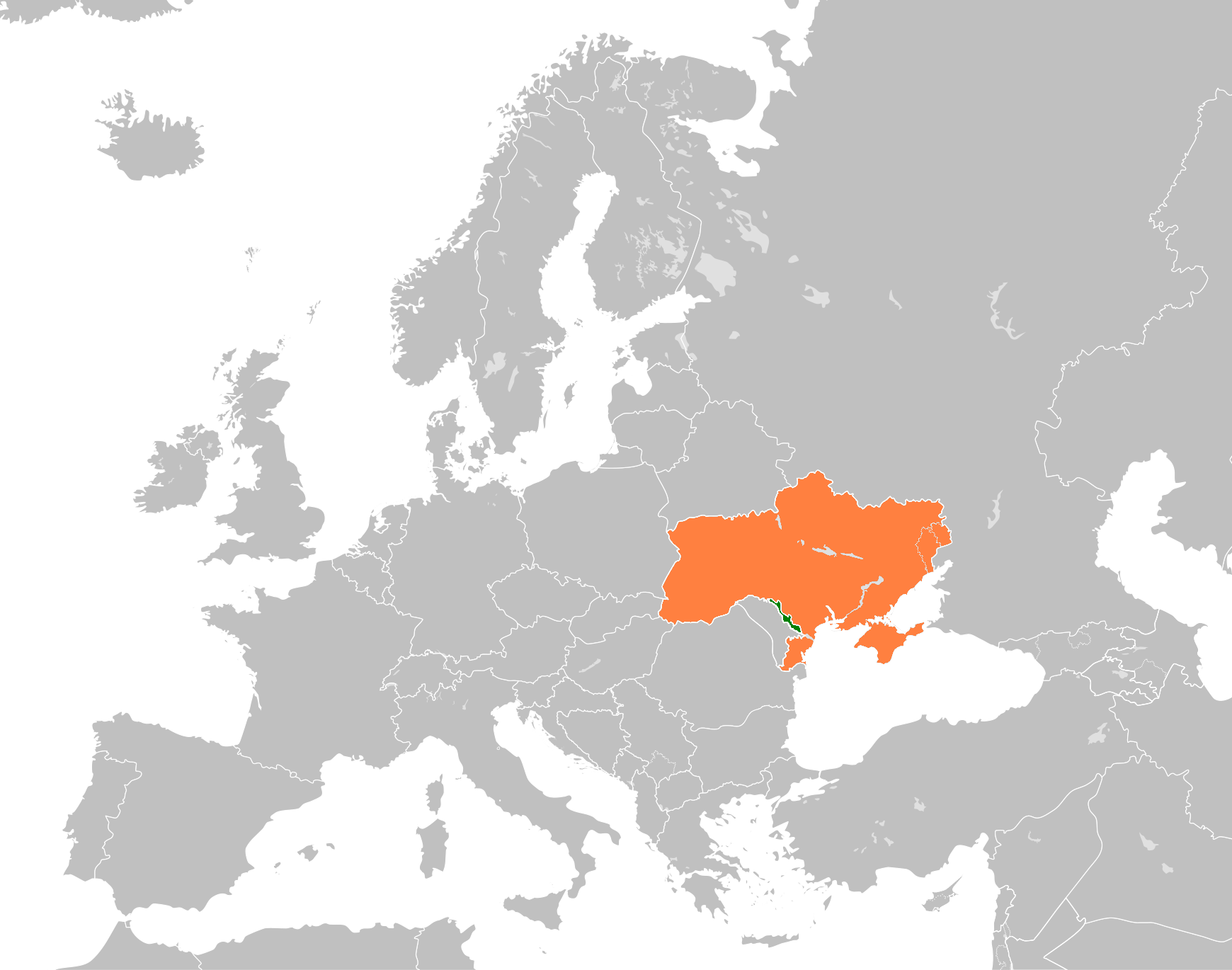

- Transnistria: Ukraine

Transnistria–Ukraine relations is the bilateral relationship between the Pridnestrovian Moldovan Republic (commonly known as Transnistria) and Ukraine. Ukraine does not officially recognize the independence of Transnistria. Nevertheless, it maintains special relations with Transnistria in the political, cultural and economic spheres.

== History ==
In 1924, the Moldavian Autonomous Soviet Socialist Republic within the Ukrainian Soviet Socialist Republic was formed. Until 1940, the territory which in the present is Transnistria was part of the Ukrainian SSR.

== Economy ==
The most influential Transnistrian company is Sheriff. This corporation has extensive foreign contacts and a well-developed network of partners, especially in Russia, Ukraine and Belarus.

== Modern relations ==
The relations between Transnistria and Ukraine have changed on several times, depending on the foreign policy orientation of the government in Kyiv. In 2012, Marcin Kosienkowski defined Ukraine as Transnistria's "main window to the outside world" as a result of Transnistria being in conflict with its parent state Moldova. Currently, about 29% of the Transnistrian population is ethnically Ukrainian.

In June 1992, then Ukrainian President Leonid Kravchuk said that Ukraine would guarantee the independence of Transnistria in case of a Moldovan-Romanian union. In secret, Ukrainian authorities negotiated with the government of Transnistria with the goal of Transnistria joining Ukraine.

In 2001, representatives of the European Union asked the Ukrainian government to close the Transnistrian–Ukrainian border. The Ukrainian government under Leonid Kuchma ignored these requests.

Between late 2004 and early 2005, the Orange Revolution changed the government in Ukraine, with Viktor Yushchenko becoming the new president. In 2006, Yushchenko's government began co-operating with the EU and the central government in Moldova in order to control the cross-border traffic from and to Transnistria. Already in 2005, the European Union Border Assistance Mission to Moldova and Ukraine had begun. In early 2006, the Ukrainian government allowed cross-border traffic that crossed the border without being inspected by the EUBAM mission. In 2005, Petro Poroshenko was the Secretary of the Ukrainian National Security and Defense Council. Within the Orange government, he was accused of lobbying for Transnistria within the pro-Western Ukrainian camp.

In the summer of 2006, Ukrainian foreign minister Borys Tarasyuk visited Transnistria, but did not meet with Transnistrian officials. He however visited the grave of Ivan Mazepa in Bender. His visit was disrupted by anti-NATO demonstrators.

As of 2009, Ukrainian entrepreneurs held about one third of the Transnistrian economy. This included shares of Moldova Steel Works held by Hryhoriy Surkis, Ihor Kolomoyskyi, Alisher Usmanov, Vadym Novynskyi and Rinat Akhmetov.

During the presidency of Viktor Yanukovych, Ukraine supported the Russian stance towards Transnistria. In the course of the presidency, Ukraine supported a tactic of "small steps" in the 5+2 talks on the settlement of the Transnistria conflict.

The 2014 Ukrainian Crisis had mostly economic repercussions on Transnistria. In the aftermath of the 2014 Odesa clashes Ukrainian officials claimed that Russian nationals from Transnistria were involved in those clashes.

In 2014, Ukrainian president Petro Poroshenko has said that Transnistria is not a sovereign state, but rather, the name of a region along the Ukraine–Moldova border.

In 2017, Transnistrian president Vadim Krasnoselsky said that Transnistria had "traditionally good relations with (Ukraine), we want to maintain them" and "we must build our relations with Ukraine – this is an objective necessity".

After winning the 2019 Ukrainian presidential election, the new Ukrainian president Volodymyr Zelenskyy held a press conference with then-Moldovan prime-minister (and now Moldovan president) Maia Sandu and assured his support of the territorial integrity of Moldova.

Relations were strained during the 2022 Russian invasion of Ukraine. Early in the war, Yuriy Vernydub, manager of the famous FC Sheriff Tiraspol quit his job in order to fight for the Ukrainian Armed Forces. In early March, Ukrainian troops blew up a bridge that connects Transnistria to the country. The Transnistrian president and other officials refrained from publicly endorsing a faction in the Russian invasion of Ukraine. On 27 April 2022, Oleksii Arestovych, an adviser to the head of Ukraine's presidential office, stated his country could "take control" of Transnistria should the Moldovan government request it. In early 2023, it was rumoured that the government of Ukraine might be interested in occupying Transnistria.

In March 2023, security services in Transnistria accused the Ukrainian government of attempting to assassinate top Transnistrian officials, including Vadim Krasnoselsky. The Ukrainian government rejected the allegations.

== See also ==
- Moldova–Ukraine relations
