= Odesa Triangle =

Trilateral cooperation format

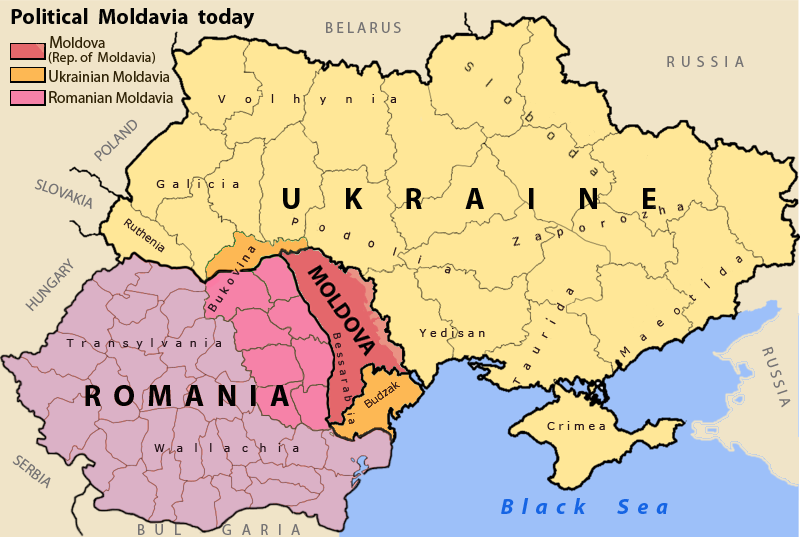
Map of the modern states of Moldova, Romania, and Ukraine, with the former Principality of Moldavia highlighted

The Odesa Triangle, (Note: Romanian: Triunghiul Odesa. Ukrainian: Одеський трикутник, romanized: Odesjkyj Trykutnyk.) also known as Moldova–Romania–Ukraine trilateral cooperation, (Note: Romanian: cooperarea trilaterală Moldova–România–Ucraina or Romanian: Trilaterala România – Ucraina – Republica Moldova. Ukrainian: тристороннє співробітництво Молдова–Румунія–Україна, romanized: trystoronnje spisrobitnyctvo Moldova–Rumunija–Ukrajina.) the trilateral format, or trilateral forum, is a joint cooperation format between the Eastern European countries of Moldova, Romania and Ukraine since 2022. The trilateral cooperation format began with a 15 September 2022 ministerial meeting in Odesa in response to the February 2022 full-scale Russian invasion of Ukraine, consisting of a loose set of trilateral agreements and intergovernmental negotiations between the three countries that gradually became more permanent, until it was officially named the "Odesa Triangle" at the 8 August 2025 summit in Chernivtsi.

Some earlier intergovernmental forms of trilateral cooperation were established starting from the independence of Ukraine and Moldova from the Soviet Union in 1991. The mid-2020s format of trilateral cooperation between Ukraine, Moldova, and Romania, has been described by their respective governments and outside observers as Romania serving as a "bridge" to the European Union (EU) and membership for the former two, as well as NATO membership for Ukraine.

== History ==
=== Transnistrian War and aftermath (1990s) and the 5+2 format (2005–2022) ===
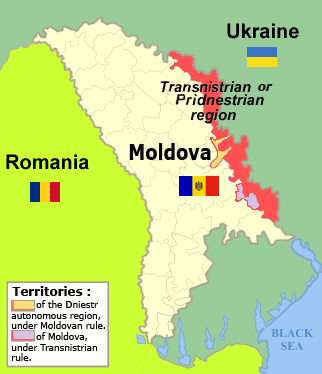
Territorial control after the end of the Transnistrian War

The 5+2 format, also known as the 5+2 talks, the 5+2 negotiations and the 5+2 process, is a diplomatic negotiation platform aimed at finding a solution to the Transnistria conflict between Moldova and the unrecognized state of Transnistria. It is composed of the latter two, which are designated as "parties to the conflict", and Russia, Ukraine and the Organization for Security and Co-operation in Europe (OSCE), "mediators" of the negotiations. The European Union (EU) and the United States act as "observers".

The inclusion of Romania into the 5+2 format has been proposed. Initially, negotiations to resolve the Transnistria conflict took place in a "4" format, including Moldova, Russia, Ukraine and Romania. However, after the signing of the Transnistria War ceasefire agreement on 21 July 1992 by Moldovan president Mircea Snegur and Russian president Boris Yeltsin, Romania was excluded from the negotiation process in 1993.

The 5+2 format started in 2005, but due to the notice sent by Ukraine to the European Union Border Assistance Mission to Moldova and Ukraine (EUBAM) regarding the great amount of Transnistrian smuggling on Ukrainian territory, Transnistria and Russia suspended formal negotiations in 2006, with them only being formally resumed in 2012.

In June 2016, through 5+2 format negotiations, eight points to work on during negotiations were agreed upon between Moldova and Transnistria, these points being collectively known as the Berlin Plus package. By April 2018, six of these points had been implemented, after which negotiations stalled due to domestic and global changes.

In 2022, 5+2 format negotiations were rendered impossible as a result of the Russian invasion of Ukraine, as both Russia and Ukraine are members of the format.

=== First trilateral initiatives (late 1990s) ===
At the first trilateral presidential summit in Izmail of 3–4 July 1997, the Trilateral cooperation between the three countries was formally established with the signing of three documents:

1. Protocol of Trilateral Collaboration between the Governments of Romania, the Republic of Moldova and Ukraine;
2. Declaration of the Presidents of Romania, the Republic of Moldova and Ukraine on trilateral cooperation; and
3. Declaration of the Presidents of Romania, the Republic of Moldova and Ukraine on collaboration in combating organised crime.

On 22 October 1998, the second trilateral summit in Chișinău, the Memorandum of Understanding on cooperation in the field of combating organised crime was signed. On 6 July 1999, the Trilateral Agreement on Collaboration in the Field of Combating Organised Crime was signed in Kyiv by the countries' three Interior Ministers (entering into force on 4 April 2001).

=== Upper Prut Euroregion (2000–present) ===
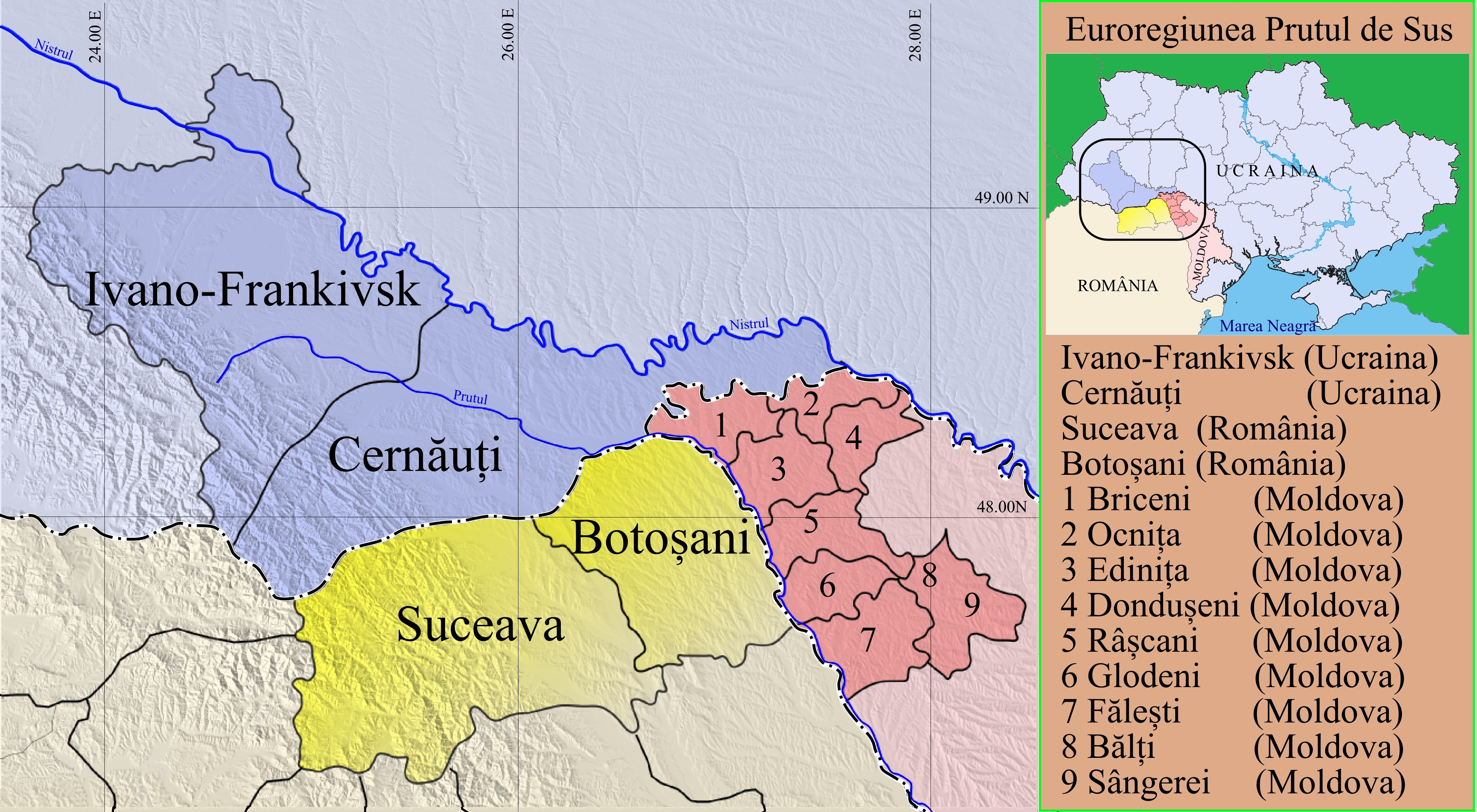
The Upper Prut Euroregion, a cross-border initiative established between Ukraine, Romania and Moldova in 2000

The Upper Prut Euroregion was established by the agreement of 22 September 2000. It is an administrative structure of cross-border cooperation between Romania, the Republic of Moldova and Ukraine. The Euroregion encompasses Chernivtsi Oblast and Ivano-Frankivsk Oblast of Ukraine, the Botoșani County and Suceava County of Romania, and 9 districts in northwestern Moldova. The motive for its creation is related both to the interest of the European Union to get involved in its own border area, located in the vicinity of areas of instability, and to that of the participating states. Its evolution led to the initiation of cultural and social exchanges as well as the implementation of cooperation projects regarding economic development, infrastructure and environmental protection.

=== Odesa Triangle (2022–present) ===
On 15 September 2022, the first (informal) trilateral ministerial-level meeting between the Ukrainian, Moldovan and Romanian ministers of foreign affairs and energy was held in Odesa. It focused on strongly condemning the Russian full-scale invasion of Ukraine, the need for restoring (energy) stability and security in the region, and intensive cooperation on helping Ukraine and Moldova integrate into the European Union. At the second (formal) trilateral ministerial meeting in Bucharest on 13 April 2023, the ministers of foreign affairs and defence discussed the same issues plus a stronger emphasis on military security, stating in a joint declaration: "We have underlined the importance of the Romania-Republic of Moldova-Ukraine trilateral format of dialogue and cooperation in bringing our countries closer and reiterated our strong engagement to continue our coordination in this format."

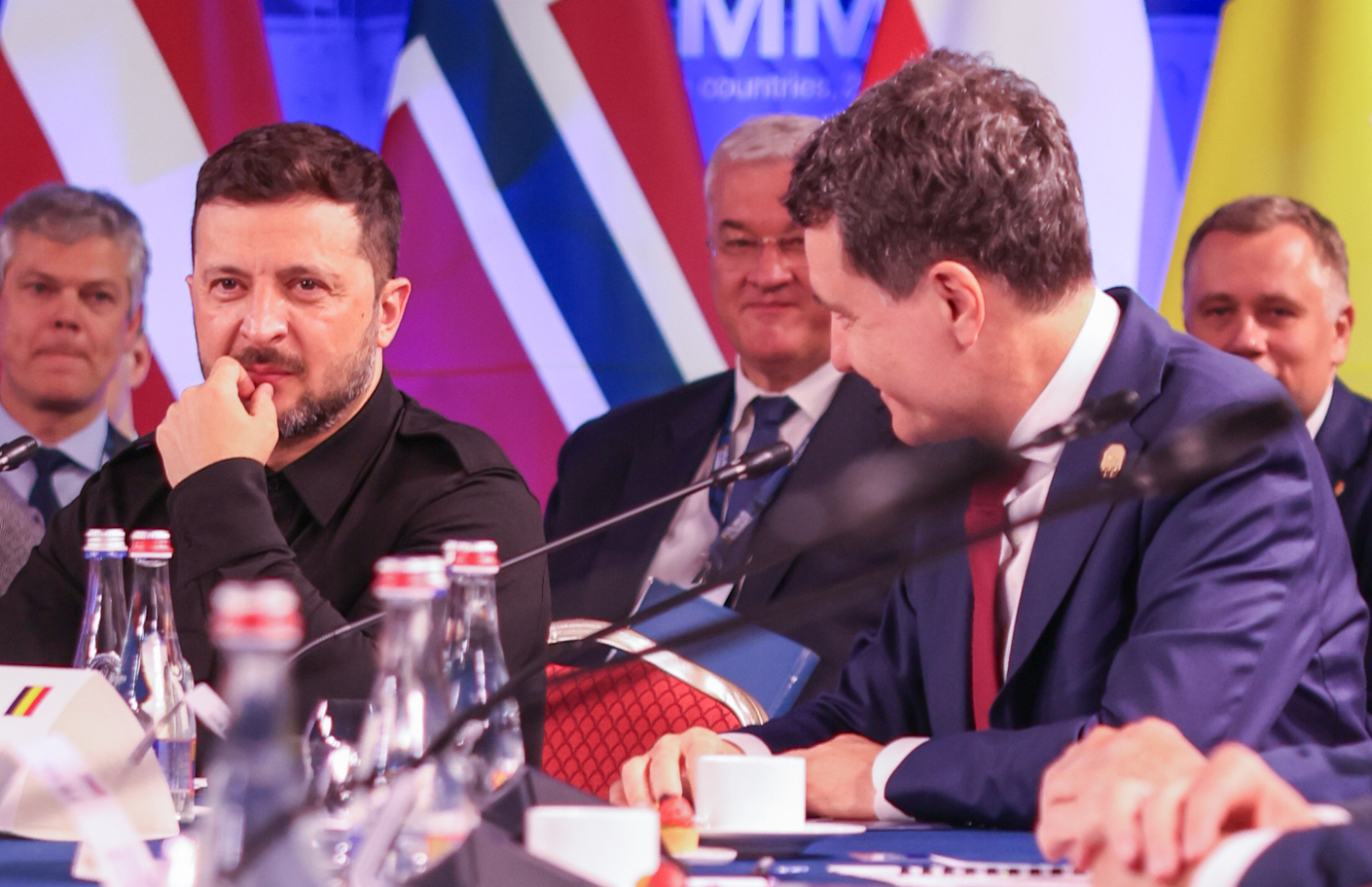
Zelenskyy and Dan at the 2 June 2025 Bucharest Nine Summit in Vilnius

On 6 November 2022, a direct passenger rail service between Kyiv and Chișinău was re-established after 20 years of having no immediate train route between the capitals of Ukraine and Moldova. The EU proposed in August 2023 that their Trans-European Transport Network (TEN-T) be extended to Moldova and onwards to Ukraine with a standard gauge (1435mm) rail line, to assist in the integration of Moldova with EU rail networks. Starting with the Ungheni, on the border with Romania, to Chișinău, by laying a new line alongside the existing 1520mm track, to avoid disruption to existing traffic.

In July 2023, the Trilateral Business Forum was held in Chernivtsi. In April 2024, the customs authorities of Moldova, Romania and Ukraine signed a Memorandum of Understanding on the eCustoms pilot programme within the EU4Digital Initiative. On 5 July 2024 in Chișinău, at the third trilateral meeting of the three ministers of foreign affairs, they signed a cooperation agreement to counter Russian disinformation campaigns. That meeting also involved discussing cross-border infrastructure projects with representatives of the respective energy and transport ministries.

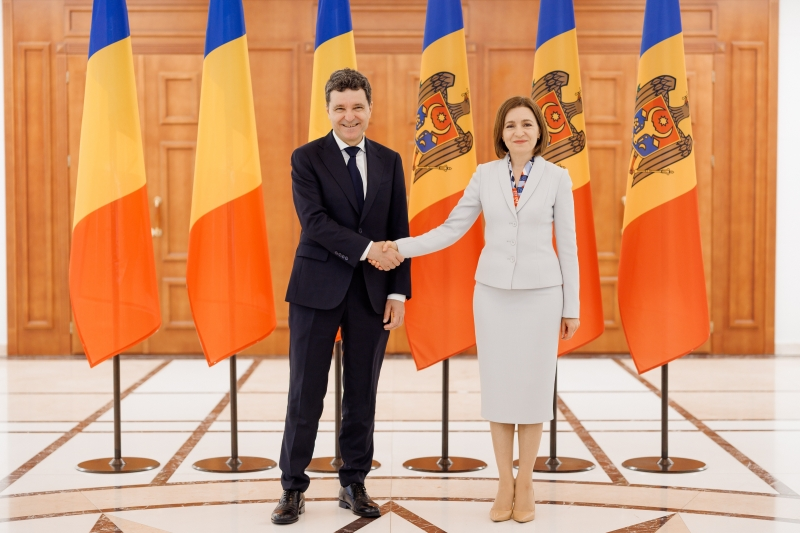
Romanian President Dan and Moldovan President Sandu shaking hands in Chișinău on 10 June 2025, one day before their historic trilateral presidential summit with Ukrainian President Zelenskyy in Odesa

On 11 June 2025, the first trilateral summit of the three countries' presidents Maia Sandu, Nicușor Dan, and Volodymyr Zelenskyy was held in Odesa. Here, the three countries announced a "permanent coordination mechanism between the Ministries of Foreign Affairs". By June 2025, the trilateral framework had come to include common policy approaches and joint agreements on issues such as energy and transport infrastructure projects, business, border customs, combating Russian disinformation, and strengthening sanctions against Russia. The trilateral was described by GMFUS as a "mini-alliance of political and economic cooperation", although agreements on (military) security issues had remained rather informal so far.

In late July and early August 2025, the three countries agreed to establish a Trilateral Cyber Alliance for cybersecurity, in order to counter cyber threats by Russia. At a 8 August 2025 summit in Chernivtsi, the trilateral cooperation format between Moldova, Romania and Ukraine was officially named the "Odesa Triangle".

On 10 October 2025, the foreign ministers of the Odesa Triangle officially opened a new direct railway connection, dubbed the "friendship train" (Prietenia), from Kyiv via Chișinău to Bucharest (with the bogie exchange taking place at the break of gauge at Ungheni). A previous railway between Kyiv and Bucharest via the Vicșani–Vadul Siret route, bypassing Moldova, had been closed for 5 years. But after successful trilateral negotiations for resumption in Darabani in August 2025, and a test run finding no technical problems, train passenger services via the new route through Ungheni and Chișinău began in September 2025.

During the 19–20 January 2026 trilateral conference in Chișinău, while Moldova stated it was finalising its formal legal withdrawal from the Commonwealth of Independent States (CIS), the three states jointly announced the establishment of the Romania–Ukraine–Moldova Trilateral Chamber of Commerce (CCTRUM) in Iași. This concept was first proposed by the Institute for Project Development and Expertise (IDEP) Moldova at the 4 June 2025 conference at the European Parliament, and later included in the strategic document of the Alliance of Members of the European Parliament from Eastern Europe for the Reconstruction of Ukraine. Over 400 institutions from all three countries have reportedly endorsed the CCTRUM, which is also supported by the European Parliament and Commission; a working group including EU officials was created in order to implement the agreements. On 8 April 2026, Moldova enacted its withdrawal from the CIS, which will take effect 12 months later, in April 2027.

== Policy areas ==
=== Overview ===
Maia Sandu receiving Volodymyr Zelenskyy at the 2023 2nd European Political Community Summit in Moldova

- Energy and transport infrastructure projects and security, including the EU Solidarity Lanes to Ukraine and energy security in Moldova following the 2025 Moldovan energy crisis (due to the discontinuation of Russian gas supplies to Transnistria through Ukrainian territory in 2025), and cross-border connectivity through railways (Bucharest–Ungheni–Chișinău–Kyiv), motorways (Ungheni–Chișinău–Odesa), and maritime infrastructure;
- Business, including the establishment of a joint Chamber of Commerce and Industry in Iași (January 2026), and Romania and Moldova's involvement in Ukraine's post-war reconstruction and economic development;
- Border customs, including eCustoms and Black Sea coastguard operations, the Moldova–Ukraine–Romania Customs Working Group (established in 2023), and the UA–MD–RO Customs Training Platform (established in September 2025);
- Cooperation on the integration of Moldova and Ukraine into the European Union;
- Alignment and cooperation in foreign policy and diplomacy;
- Joint cybersecurity and combating Russian disinformation, including in Russia's war against Ukraine, and Russia's hybrid warfare against Moldova and Romania;
- Strengthening sanctions against Russia, and ensuring a just and lasting peace in the region;
- Military and technical cooperation on defence-related challenges.

=== Dynamics ===
While Moldova, Romania and Ukraine do not have a formal trilateral security agreement (as of January 2026), Moldova and Ukraine have been closely cooperating (increasingly with the help of EU member Romania) in their efforts to accede to the European Union, to fend off hybrid Russian threats, or pro-Russian threats from the breakaway region of Transnistria. The EU has signed bilateral security agreements with both Ukraine (27 June 2024) and Moldova (21 May 2024), while Romania signed a bilateral security agreement with Ukraine (11 July 2024). Moldova has a constitutionally enshrined policy of neutrality, and unlike Ukraine, it does not seek membership of NATO. Yet, it has applied for full EU membership (just like Ukraine), which would bring it into a quasi-defensive alliance with both of its neighbours, and potentially in direct conflict with the Russian Federation's military forces stationed in Transnistria.

Due to Russia's naval aggression in the Black Sea, Moldova lost practical access to Ukraine's ports, while the latter country's capacity has been severely limited due to security constraints. Romania sought to assist by granting access to the Port of Constanța (covered by the EU and NATO alliance umbrellas), which both Ukraine and Moldova benefited from. But by June 2025, the Port of Constanța had become overcrowded and highly expensive, requiring the EU, Bulgaria and Turkey to become involved in ensuring freedom of navigation along the western Black Sea coast.

== See also ==
- Moldova–Romania relations
- Moldova–Ukraine relations
- Romania–Ukraine relations
- Moldova–European Union relations
- Accession of Moldova to the European Union
- Ukraine–European Union relations
- Accession of Ukraine to the European Union
- 5+2 format: negotiations (2005–2022) on the Transnistria conflict between 2 parties (Transnistria and Moldova); 3 mediators (Ukraine, Russia, and the OSCE); and 2 observers (the European Union and the United States)
- Association Trio: Georgia, Moldova, and Ukraine (since 2021)
- Balkan Battlegroup: EU Battlegroup since 2007 involving Romania and Ukraine, amongst others
- Lublin Triangle: Lithuania, Poland, and Ukraine (since 2020)
- GUAM Organization for Democracy and Economic Development: Ukraine, Moldova, Georgia, and Azerbaijan (since 1997)
- Three Seas Initiative: forum of 13 EU states including Romania and 4 non-EU partner-participants including Ukraine (since 2022) and Moldova (since 2023)
- Unification of Moldova and Romania, frequently discussed political idea
- Violations of non-combatant airspace during the Russo-Ukrainian war (2022–present), including over Moldova and Romania
  - Operation Eastern Sentry: NATO operation (including Romania) in response to the 2025 Russian drone incursion into Poland
