= GUAM Organization for Democracy and Economic Development =

Regional organization of post-Soviet states

(in state languages)
Azerbaijani	GUAM Demokratiya və İqtisadi İnkişaf naminə Təşkilat
Georgian	დემოკრატიისა და ეკონომიკური განვითარების ორგანიზაცია სუამი
Romanian	GUAM Organizația pentru Democrație și Dezvoltare Economică
Ukrainian	ГУАМ Організація за демократію та економічний розвиток
- Logo

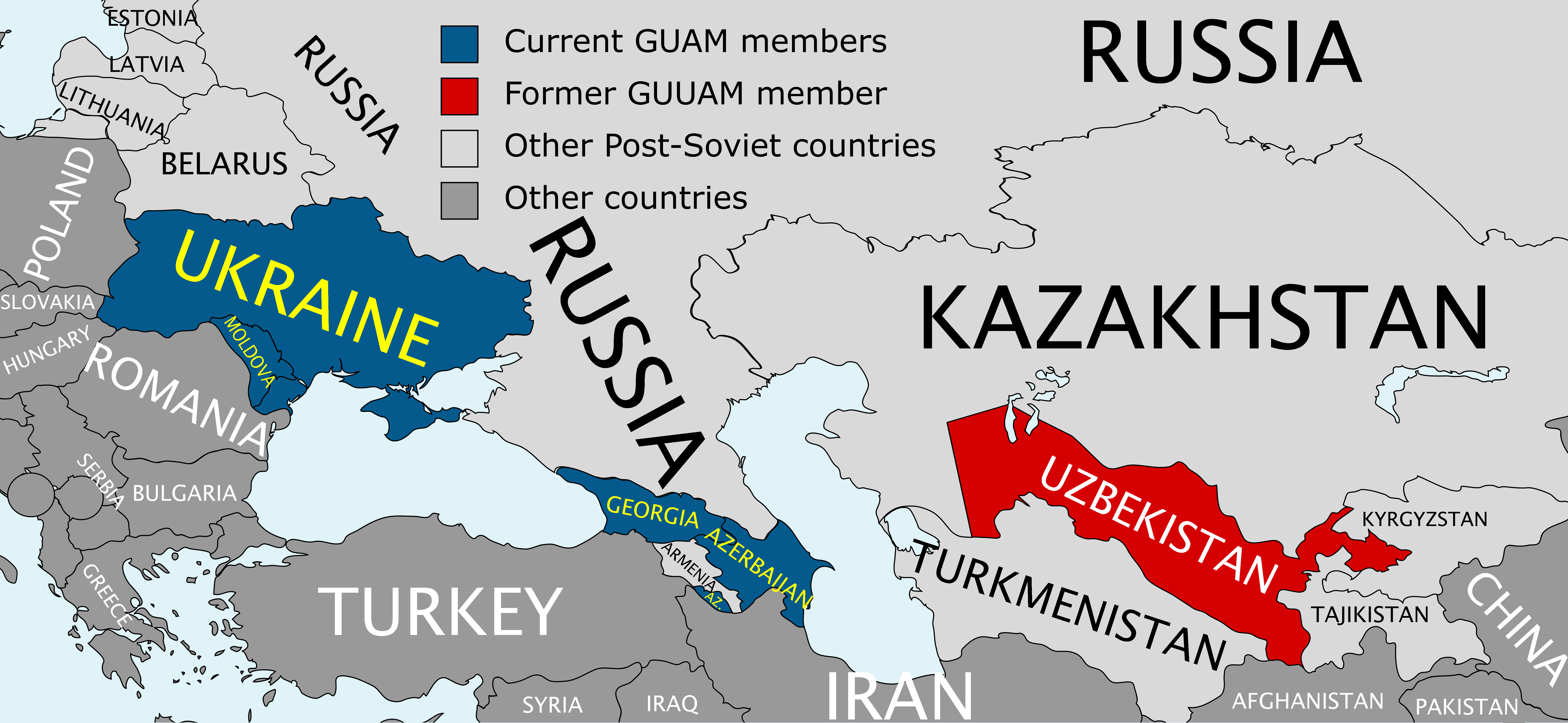
- GUAM members in blue; former member in red
- Headquarters: Kyiv, Ukraine
- Official language: Russian (1997−2014); English (2014−)
- Member states: Georgia; Ukraine; Azerbaijan; Moldova

Establishment
  - GUAM consultative forum: 10 October 1997
  - Uzbekistan membership, GUUAM established: 1999
  - Charter signed: June 2001
  - Uzbekistan withdrew, GUAM reestablished: May 2005

Area
  - Total: 810,506 km^{2} (312,938 sq mi)

Population
  - 2025 estimate: ▼45,273,327 (Note: Excludes the Autonomous Republic of Crimea and the city of Sevastopol, Ukraine's de jure territory which is occupied by Russia (however, includes the Donbas region, partly occupied by Russia).)
  - Density: 55.85/km^{2} (144.7/sq mi)
- GDP (PPP): 2026 estimate
  - Total: ▲$1.180 trillion
  - Per capita: ▲$20,784
- GDP (nominal): 2026 estimate
  - Total: ▲$372.383 billion
  - Per capita: ▲$6,561
- Website https://guam-organization.org/

The GUAM Organization for Democracy and Economic Development is a regional organization of four post-Soviet states: Georgia, Ukraine, Azerbaijan, and Moldova.

Conceived in 1997 to harmonize and integrate commercial, diplomatic and democratic relations among its member states, the GUAM treaty charter was signed in 2001 and today covers a population of over 49.8 million people. Uzbekistan was also a member of GUAM in the 1999–2005 period. In 2003, GUAM became an observer in the UN General Assembly. In 2007, GUAM also established a military peacekeeping force and organized joint military exercises. Such increasingly deepened integration and relationships led to GUAM playing an important role in the region's diplomatic and commercial affairs.

The agreement on a Free Trade Area was signed in 2002. In 2017, additional agreements on a free-trade area were announced, but as of 2022 reportedly the FTA has not been ratified and has not entered into force. The WTO was notified only in 2017 and the Agreement is designated as "Plurilateral" and "In Force". According to the WTO database, the GUAM FTA agreement was signed in 2002 and entered into force in 2003. International Trade Centre says there is no free trade area in operation with distinct rules from an Agreement on Creation of CIS Free Trade Area, was signed on 15 April 1994 by 12 CIS countries.

The database of agreements of the International Trade Centre does not indicate that a GUAM FTA agreement has been concluded, but it does indicate that the 1994 Agreement on CIS FTA is in force for Georgia, Ukraine, Azerbaijan and Moldova. and the 1999 Agreement on CIS FTA version is listed as the current text of the FTA agreement.

The official negotiating language of GUAM was Russian, but it was scrapped in favor of English in 2014.

Election monitoring by GUAM has been described as "low-quality", as observers from the group validate flawed elections.

== History ==
=== Origins and foundation, Uzbek membership (1997–2005) ===
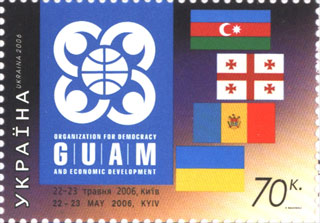
70-kopeck Ukrainian postage stamp commemorating the GUAM Summit held in Kyiv, 22–23 May 2006

Cooperation between Georgia, Ukraine, Azerbaijan, and Moldova started with the "GUAM consultative forum", established on 10 October 1997, in Strasbourg and named after the initial letters of each of those countries. In 1999, the organization adopted the name GUUAM due to the membership of Uzbekistan. A summit in Yalta on 6 and 7 June 2001 was accompanied by the signing of GUUAM's charter, which formalized the organization. According to the former Ukrainian President Viktor Yushchenko, the charter set objectives for cooperation, such as promoting democratic values, ensuring stable development, enhancing international and regional security, and stepping up European integration.

In 2002, Uzbekistan announced that it planned to withdraw from the organization and following this announcement started to ignore GUUAM summits and meetings. In May 2005, shortly after the Andijan massacre, Uzbekistan finally gave official notice of withdrawal from the organization to the Moldovan presidency, thus changing the group's name back to GUAM.

A summit of GUUAM took place in Chișinău, Moldova, on 22 April 2005. The US Department of State special representative for Eurasian conflicts, Steven Mann, and the OSCE Secretary General, Ján Kubiš, participated in the summit. The Russian ambassador in Chișinău criticized the fact that Russia was not invited to attend. Ilham Aliyev, the president of Azerbaijan, said after the summit: "Our organization is emerging as a powerful force, participating in resolving problems in the Caspian-Black Sea region" while the president of Ukraine, Viktor Yushchenko, said that a new page had been written in the history of the organization.

=== Deepening of relations and integration (2006–2013) ===
Given the growth of its influence in the region, and the existence of the Russian-led Commonwealth of Independent States (CIS), GUAM was seen in Russia as a way of countering the Russian influence in the area and as part of a strategy backed by the United States. However, GUAM leaders repeatedly and officially dismiss such claims and declare their strong willingness to develop close friendly relations with Russia. Moreover, Azerbaijan, the group's main energy power, has managed to avoid any conflicts with Russia in recent years.

In April 2006, three GUAM nations supported Ukraine's proposal to condemn the Holodomor, the 1930s famine in Ukraine which killed millions of people, as a genocide.

In May 2006, Ukraine and Azerbaijan announced plans to further increase the GUAM member relations by renaming the organization GUAM Organization for Democracy and Economic Development and establishing its headquarters in the Ukrainian capital. The other members said this was a remarkable step and development. The summit participants were also expected to adopt GUAM by-laws, a declaration and a communique. Also in May 2006 the Ukrainian Defense Ministry announced plans to establish GUAM peacekeeping forces. The following year, GUAM nations agreed to form a 500-personnel joint peacekeeping force to battle separatism.

In June 2007, presidents of Lithuania, Poland and Romania joined the leaders of GUAM member states at the GUAM summit in Baku, Azerbaijan. Also participating at the summit were the vice-president of Bulgaria, the vice-speaker of the Estonian parliament, the minister of economy of Latvia, and the high-level representatives of the United States, Japan, the Organization for Security and Co-operation in Europe (OSCE), the Organization of the Black Sea Economic Cooperation (BSEC), UNESCO, and heads of diplomatic missions accredited in Azerbaijan.

=== After Russian invasion and annexation of Crimea (2014–present) ===
In December 2014, then-Ukrainian Foreign Minister Pavlo Klimkin proposed that GUAM should use English during meetings, instead of Russian, which was also the main language used in official gatherings in the Soviet Union. GUAM representatives agreed.

In March 2017, GUAM officially established agreements on a free-trade area and harmonization of customs procedures among its member states.

In May 2021, three of the four members, Ukraine, Moldova, and Georgia, joined the Association Trio in order to jointly facilitate further European integration.

A clickable Euler diagram showing the relationships among various supranational organisations in the territory of the former Soviet Union

== Free trade area negotiations ==
An agreement on Establishment of Free Trade Area between the GUUAM Participating States was signed on 20 July 2002.

In 2017 Ukraine announced agreements on a free-trade area and harmonization of customs procedures among its member states.

At the 77th Session of the United Nations (UN) General Assembly held in New York on 20 September 2022, the Foreign Ministers of the Organization for Democracy and Economic Development (GUAM) members came together on the sidelines and held the 39th Cabinet meeting of GUAM. After the meeting, the Ministers of Foreign Affairs of Georgia, Ukraine, Azerbaijan and Moldova signed a protocol on the determination of the country of origin of the goods. In addition, it was announced by the Ministry of Foreign Affairs of Ukraine that a free trade zone was established between the GUAM countries.

The Free Trade Area has not been ratified and has not entered into force. It is too soon to be sure whether GUAM member states will ratify the free trade area soon, or if the project will be placed on hiatus. There is also the question about to what extent an FTA could help financially GUAM countries compared to other projects, such as European Union membership or the Middle Corridor. GUAM is a regional bloc that has not demonstrated its usefulness to its member states compared to other organizations or projects that GUAM member states are part of.

== Members ==
Current

- Georgia (1997)
- Ukraine (1997)
- Azerbaijan (1997)
- Moldova (1997)

Former

- Uzbekistan (1999–2002)

== See also ==
- Association Trio
- Black Sea Forum
- Commonwealth of Independent States
- Community for Democracy and Rights of Nations
- Community of Democratic Choice
- Euronest Parliamentary Assembly
- Military of Azerbaijan
- Military of Georgia
- Military of Moldova
- Military of Ukraine
- Odesa Triangle
- Politics of Europe
- Post-Soviet states
- Shanghai Cooperation Organisation
- TRACECA

== Sources ==
- "Ukraine suggests setting up GUAM peacekeeping unit". Today.az. 31 May 2006.
- "Azerbaijan-GUAM". Ministry of Foreign Affairs of Azerbaijan. Archived from the original on 16 April 2007.
- GUAM News (subscribers only)
- Baku Today
- "The GUUAM Group: History and Principles". guuam.org. Archived from the original on 28 July 2007.
- "Welcome to TRACECA". TRACECA (Transport Corridor Europe Caucasus Asia) IGC.
- "GUAM Group". Eurasian Home. Archived from the original on 1 September 2007.
