= Community of Democratic Choice =

European intergovernmental organization

- Formation: 2005
- Type: Political cooperation organization
- Location: Europe
- Members: 18

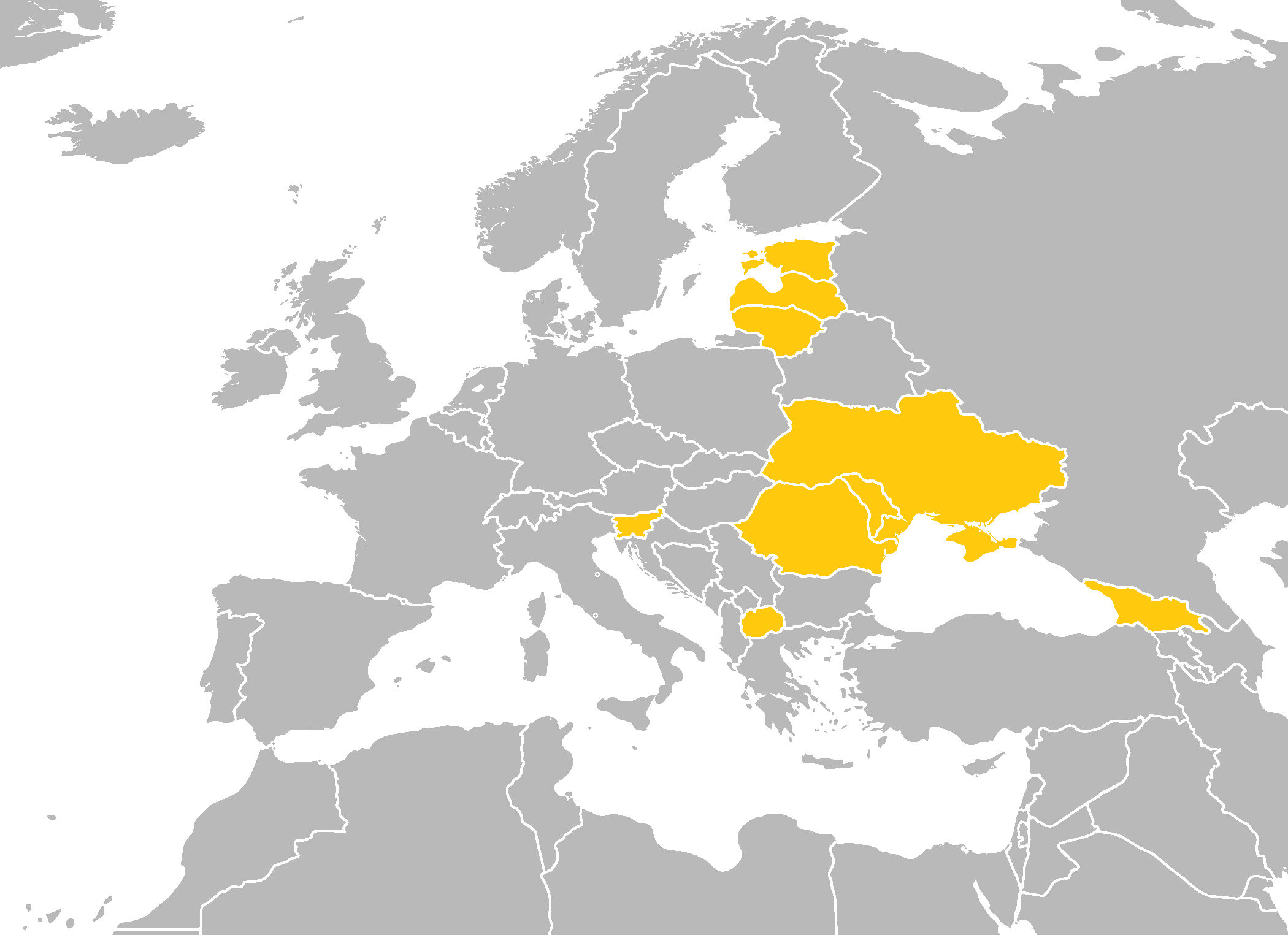
Members of the Community of Democratic Choice

The Community of Democratic Choice is an intergovernmental organization established on 2 December 2005, by nine states of Northern, Central and Eastern Europe in Kyiv, Ukraine. It was mainly signed by countries from the region between the Baltic, Black Sea and Caspian Sea ("The three Seas"). Its main task is to promote democracy, human rights, and the rule of law throughout the region.

== Membership ==
- Founding member states:
  - Estonia
  - Georgia
  - Lithuania
  - Latvia
  - Moldova
  - North Macedonia
  - Romania
  - Slovenia
  - Ukraine
- Observer countries/organizations:
  - Armenia
  - Azerbaijan
  - Bulgaria
  - Czech Republic
  - Hungary
  - Poland
  - United States
  - European Union
  - Organization for Security and Co-operation in Europe (OSCE)

== History ==
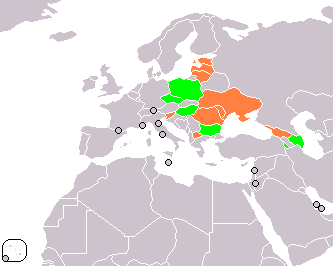
Community of Democratic Choice (CDC) members observers

The creation of the Community of Democratic Choice was foreshadowed by the Borjomi Declaration of August 2005, a joint statement signed by the Presidents of Georgia and Ukraine, Mikheil Saakashvili and Viktor Yushchenko, which envisioned the Community as a "powerful instrument for removing the remaining divisions in the region, tackling human rights violations, and any type of confrontation, or frozen conflicts".

The Community of Democratic Choice was subsequently established in Kyiv during a two-day forum aimed at promoting democracy and human rights in the wider region of the Baltic-Black-Caspian Seas. Besides the presidents of the nine founding states, there were delegations from Armenia, Azerbaijan, Bulgaria, the Czech Republic, Hungary, and Poland, as well as observers from the United States, the European Union and the Organization for Security and Cooperation in Europe.

== Purpose ==
The Ukrainian Foreign Minister Borys Tarasyuk, said that the community is not a project against anybody, but rather a project in favor of democracy, stability and prosperity. Likewise, President Viktor Yushchenko said that the initiative was not directed against any third countries or institutions and that its purpose was not "to befriend anyone against someone else", but that it must rather be seen as "dialogue between friends, adherents of ideas for promoting democracy and the supremacy of law".

On the other hand, Giorgi Arveladze, presidential administration head of Georgia, said that the community would in essence be "an axis of democratic countries that do not wish to remain in Russia's orbit".

Temuri Yakobashvili, the vice-president of the Georgian Foundation for Strategic and International Studies said that he saw the Community of Democratic Choice as something in between the two main "poles of attraction" in the region (the EU and the Shanghai Cooperation Organisation), saying that "the idea of creating a Community of Democratic Choice may appeal to those countries that are caught between those two blocs, but lean toward democracy and the West."

Besides the question of its character, the membership of the community is still not clear. At the Vilnius Conference in 2006, the two founding members Macedonia and Slovenia did not take part with representatives but one of the hosts was Poland. Further the Prime Minister of Sweden, Göran Persson stated his country's intention to join the organization that was welcomed by Saakashvilli, saying that Sweden's entry would provide additional impetus to the CDC forum. So up till now there the question of membership in the CDC is not answered.

Nevertheless, the President of Moldova, Vladimir Voronin, urged the Community to develop its own institutions, including its own parliamentary assembly, saying that it offered a possibility to integrate those countries that have chosen a European orientation. The Vilnius Conference already gave a hint to what that means by including an Intellectuals, an NGO and a Youth Forum.

== Youth Forum ==
The Community of Democratic Choice Youth Forum (CDC Youth Forum) is an international organization registered in Riga, Latvia. It aims to promote partnership and dialogue among youth from the region of the CDC. Founded under the name Youth Forum of Europe's New Democracies, it arose from a youth forum that was part of the Vilnius Conference 2006 of the Community of Democratic Choice. The youth forum consists of members from Armenia, Azerbaijan, Belarus, Slovenia, Bulgaria, Estonia, Germany, Georgia, Latvia, Lithuania, Moldova, Poland, Romania, Russia, Ukraine and United Kingdom. The main task of the forum is the promotion of democracy, human rights and the rule of law. In March 2007, delegates of the forum met in Tallinn, Estonia to institutionalize the forum and it was renamed into Community of Democratic Choice Youth Forum.

For their meeting in Vilnius, Lithuania the head of states of the Community of Democratic Choice (CDC) added an intellectuals' forum, an NGO forum and a youth forum to their summit. The youth forum was composed by 27 young Europeans from 13 countries. In its resolution it declared the foundation of the "Youth Forum of Europe's New Democracies". Nine month after the first meeting delegates of the forum met in Tallinn, Estonia to institutionalize the forum and give it a legal basis. By this the forum changed its name to CDC Youth Forum to stress out the ties to the Community of Democratic Choice. The Forum wants to inform about the CDC, its values and goals among a broader public. Thus it tries to promote and strengthen democratic values, human rights and civil society in the region of the CDC. Under the label of "Your Voice" it seeks comprehensive discussions about democracy and its values among youth via a dialogue among youth.

== Meetings ==
- December 1–2, 2005: Kyiv, Ukraine
- March 9–10, 2006: Tbilisi, Georgia
- May, 2006: Vilnius, Lithuania
- March 2007: Tallinn, Estonia
- April 2007: Lviv, Ukraine
- March 2008: Nottingham, United Kingdom

== See also ==
- Black Sea Forum for Partnership and Dialogue
- Community for Democracy and Rights of Nations
- Community of Democracies
- Community of Democratic Choice Youth Forum
- Eastern Partnership
- Euronest Parliamentary Assembly
- European Integration
- Eurasian Economic Union
- Eurosphere
- Eurovoc
- GUAM Organization for Democracy and Economic Development
- Organization of the Black Sea Economic Cooperation
- Politics of Europe
