= Euronest Parliamentary Assembly =

European inter-parliamentary forum

EuroNest Parliamentary Assembly

- European Union member states Non-EU members Suspended members
- Formation: 2011; 15 years ago
- Type: Economic and political cooperation organization
- Headquarters: Brussels, Belgium
- Location: Europe
- Members: 5 plus 27 European Parliament members
- Website: www.europarl.europa.eu

The EuroNest Parliamentary Assembly is the inter-parliamentary forum in which members of the European Parliament and the national parliaments of Ukraine, Moldova, Armenia, Azerbaijan and Georgia participate and forge closer political and economic ties with the European Union. It was established in 2011 by the European Commission as a component of the Eastern Partnership. After the elections in Belarus in 2010 were declared as flawed by the OSCE, the membership of Belarus in Euronest was automatically suspended. Belarus is welcome to re-join the Assembly once political requirements have been fulfilled. In 2015, Azerbaijan's membership was suspended due to the European Union's criticism of human rights abuses by the government. In September 2016, it was announced that Azerbaijan would take the necessary steps towards restoring ties. As of 2017, the combined population of Euronest members (excluding Belarus and European Union members) stood at 61,927,521 people.

== Member states ==
In addition to the 27 member states of the European Parliament, five Eastern European states participate:

- Armenia
- Azerbaijan
- (Georgia (country)) Georgia
- Moldova
- Ukraine

=== Suspended members ===
- Belarus

== Structure ==
The Assembly is made up of 60 members of the European Parliament and 10 members from the parliaments of each partner country. Plenary sessions are chaired by two co-presidents, one from the European Parliament and one from the partner parliaments. The Bureau of the Assembly is made up of the two co-presidents and eight vice-presidents, four from the European Parliament and four from the partner parliaments. There are four committees and three working groups.

== Plenary meetings ==
The Euronest Parliamentary Assembly meets in plenary once a year. Meeting locations alternate between an Eastern European Partner country and one of the European Parliament places of work (Brussels, Luxembourg or Strasbourg). The committees meet twice a year and working groups meet as required.

Session	Date	Host country	Host city
I	September 2011	France	Strasbourg
II	April 2012	Azerbaijan	Baku
III	May 2013	Belgium	Brussels
IV	March 2015	Armenia	Yerevan
V	March 2016	Belgium	Brussels
VI	October 2017	Ukraine	Kyiv
VII	June 2018	Belgium	Brussels
VIII	December 2019	Georgia	Tbilisi
–	2020	Cancelled due to the COVID-19 pandemic	–
IX	April 2021	Belgium	Brussels
X	February 2023	Moldova	Chișinău
XI	March 2024	Belgium	Brussels
XII	October 2025	Armenia	Yerevan

== EU integration ==
Members of Euronest have been regarded as belonging to the "European family". All members are part of the European Neighbourhood Policy and each maintain various degrees of integration with the EU. Some members of Euronest such as Ukraine and Georgia are actively seeking eventual EU membership and wish to forge closer ties with the EU. Other states such as Armenia and Moldova cooperate with both the European Union and the Eurasian Economic Union. Azerbaijan and Belarus have been questioned about their European perspectives due to human rights abuses and lack of freedom of speech.

=== Prospect of EU membership ===
Countries that could join the European Union Current members Candidate countries Applicant / potential candidate countries Membership possible Membership not possible

In December 2019, following the eighth plenary meeting held in Tbilisi, a resolution was passed by all members of the Euronest Parliamentary Assembly. The resolution outlines various EU integration goals to be achieved by 2030. The resolution highlights the importance of the Eastern Partnership program and how the initiative supports the six EU associated countries in letting them move more rapidly with reform implementation and deeper political and economic integration with the EU.

The resolution also confirms the successes of the EU Enlargement Policy and its transformative power on Central and Eastern European countries in their development from post-totalitarian regulated economies to European style democracies and that future enlargement shall spread these successes to the Eastern Partnership countries willing to join the EU. The resolution affirms that the process of EU enlargement is open to Eastern Partnership member states and that future enlargement of the EU will be mutually beneficial for both the EU and Eastern Partnership members.

Furthermore, the resolution endorses continuing progressive reforms and harmonization with EU standards, promoting European values and human rights and establishing visa free travel to the EU's Schengen Area for Eastern Partnership members.

The resolution praised the achievements made by Georgia, Moldova and Ukraine in signing Association Agreements and a Deep and Comprehensive Free Trade Area with the EU. Similarly, the resolution endorsed the progress made in Armenia following the 2018 Velvet Revolution. The resolution stated that, "Armenia is the only country in Europe to transition from being a hybrid regime in 2017 to a democracy in 2018" and that the ratification of a new Comprehensive and Enhanced Partnership Agreement (CEPA) by the Armenian Parliament in April 2018 is considered evidence of a strategically reinforced partnership between Armenia and EU. The resolution coined the term "Trio+1" which represents the three Association Agreements established with Georgia, Moldova and Ukraine, as well as the CEPA established with Armenia. The resolution calls for promoting further integration efforts between the EU and the "Trio + 1" group over the next decade.

The resolution also acknowledges the potential threat that Russia may have in destabilizing these countries and preventing them from achieving European unity.

== See also ==
- ACP–EU Joint Parliamentary Assembly
- Armenia–European Union relations
- Association Trio
- Community for Democracy and Rights of Nations
- Community of Democratic Choice
- Council of Europe
- Deep and Comprehensive Free Trade Area
- Euro-Latin American Parliamentary Assembly
- Euro-Mediterranean Parliamentary Assembly - Euronest counterpart for the Euro-Mediterranean Partnership of the ENP
- EU Strategy for the South Caucasus
- Eastern European Group
- European integration
- Eurosphere
- Eurovoc
- Georgia–European Union relations
- Moldova–European Union relations
- Organization for Security and Co-operation in Europe
- Politics of Europe
- Post-Soviet states
- TRACECA
- Ukraine–European Union relations
