= Foreign relations of the European Union =

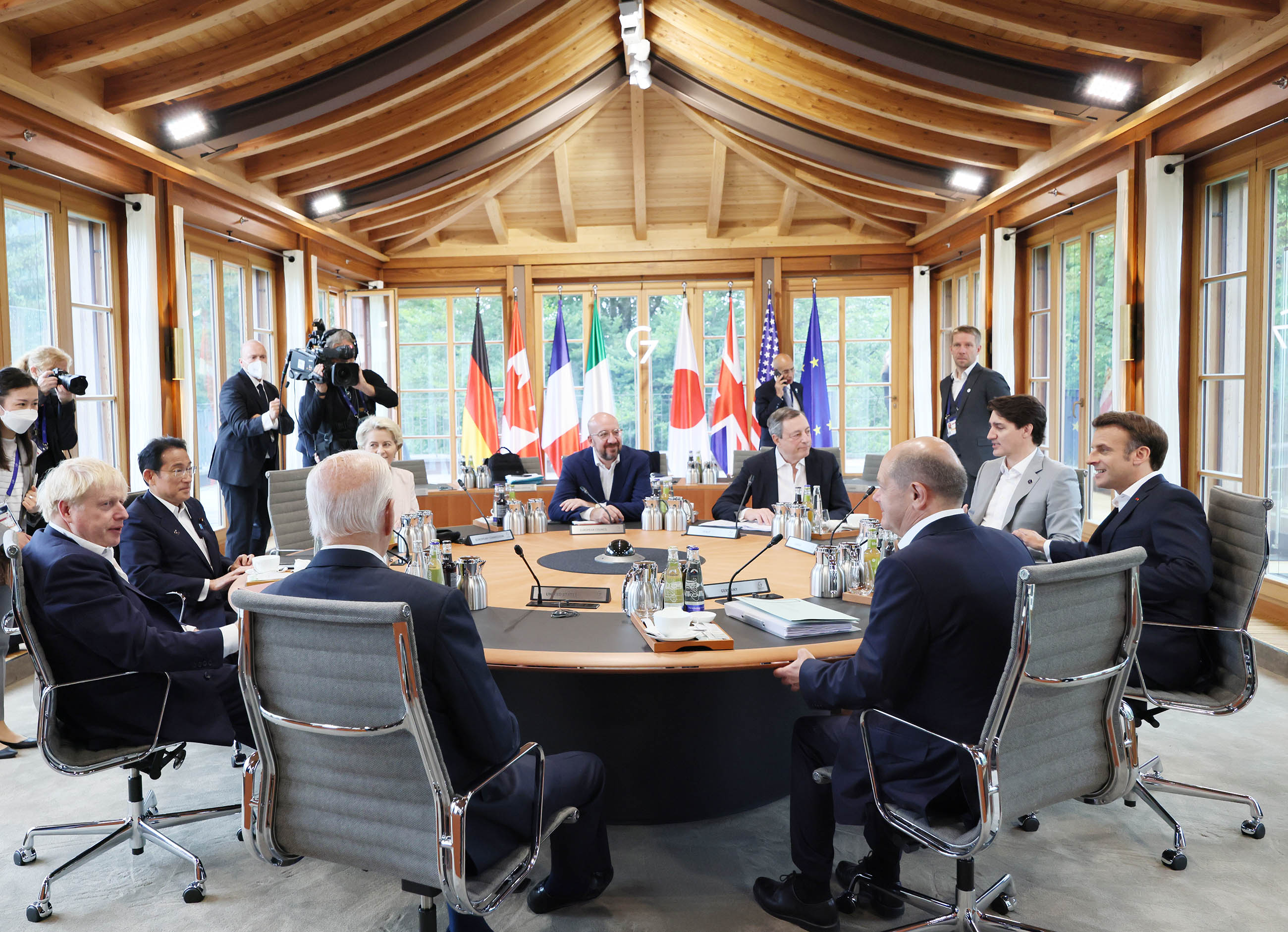
Leaders of the world's major economies on the G7 Summit 2022, Elmau, Germany

Although there has been a large degree of integration between European Union member states, foreign relations is still a largely intergovernmental matter, with the 27 states controlling their own relations to a large degree. However, with the Union holding more weight as a single entity, it periodically seeks to present a common stance, particularly on trade and energy policy. The High Representative of the Union for Foreign Affairs and Security Policy personifies this role.

== Policy and actors ==
The EU's foreign relations are dealt with either through the Common Foreign and Security Policy decided by the European Council, or the economic trade negotiations handled by the European Commission. The leading EU diplomat in both areas is the High Representative Kaja Kallas. The council can issue negotiating directives (not to be confused with directives, which are legal acts) to the Commission giving parameters for trade negotiations.

A limited amount of defence co-operation takes place within the Common Security and Defence Policy, as well as in programmes coordinated by the European Defence Agency and the Commission through the Directorate-General for Defence Industry and Space. A particular element of this in the Union's foreign relations is the use of the European Peace Facility, which can finance the common costs CSDP missions in third states or assistance measures for third states.

== Diplomatic representation ==
=== History ===
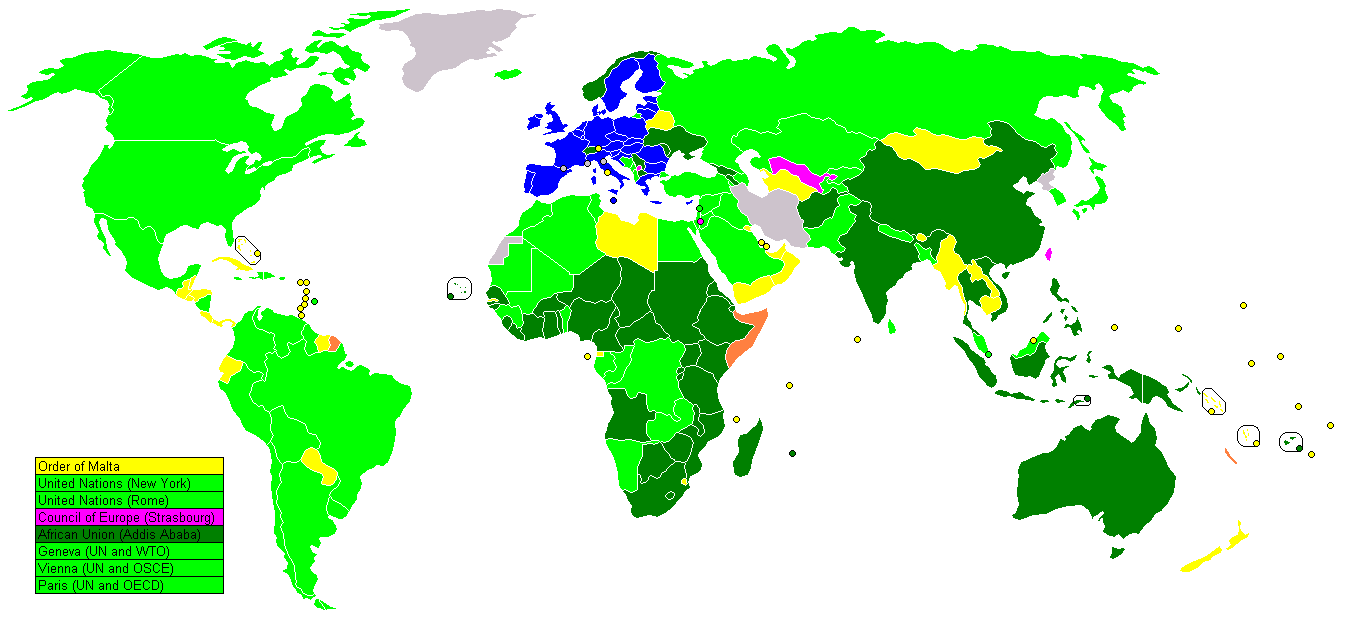
Map of European Union diplomatic missions: European Union member states and UK European Union delegation, full Lisbon duties assumed European Commission delegation duties only Accreditation from non-resident delegation European Union non-diplomatic mission only non-diplomatically responsible non-resident delegation no European Union mission, accreditation or responsibility assigned

The High Authority of the European Coal and Steel Community (ECSC), the EU's predecessor, opened its first mission in London in 1955, three years after non-EU countries began to accredit their missions in Brussels to the Community. The US had been a fervent supporter of the ECSC's efforts from the beginning, and Secretary of State Dean Acheson sent Jean Monnet a dispatch in the name of President Truman confirming full US diplomatic recognition of the ECSC. A US ambassador to the ECSC was accredited soon thereafter, and he headed the second overseas mission to establish diplomatic relations with the Community institutions.

The number of delegates began to rise in the 1960s following the merging of the executive institutions of the three European Communities into a single Commission. Until recently some states had reservations accepting that EU delegations held the full status of a diplomatic mission. Article 20 of the Maastricht Treaty requires the Delegations and the Member States' diplomatic missions to "co-operate in ensuring that the common positions and joint actions adopted by the Council are complied with and implemented".

As part of the process of establishment of the European External Action Service envisioned in the Lisbon Treaty, on 1 January 2010 all former European Commission delegations were renamed European Union delegations and by the end of the month 54 of the missions were transformed into embassy-type missions that employ greater powers than the regular delegations. These upgraded delegations have taken on the role previously carried out by the national embassies of the member state holding the rotating Presidency of the Council of the European Union and merged with the independent Council delegations around the world. Through this the EU delegations take on the role of coordinating national embassies and speaking for the EU as a whole, not just the commission.

The first delegation to be upgraded was the one in Washington D.C., the new joint ambassador was João Vale de Almeida who outlined his new powers as speaking for both the Commission and Council presidents, and member states. He would be in charge where there was a common position but otherwise, on bilateral matters, he would not take over from national ambassadors.

=== Locations ===
The EU sends its delegates generally only to the capitals of states outside the European Union and cities hosting multilateral bodies. The EU missions work separately from the work of the missions of its member states, however in some circumstances it may share resources and facilities. In Abuja it shares its premises with a number of member states. Additionally to the third-state delegations and offices the European Commission maintains representation in each of the member states.

Prior to the establishment of the European External Action Service by the Treaty of Lisbon there were separate delegations of the Council of the European Union to the United Nations in New York, to the African Union and to Afghanistan – in addition to the European Commission delegations there. In the course of 2010 these would be transformed into integrated European Union delegations.

=== Member state missions ===
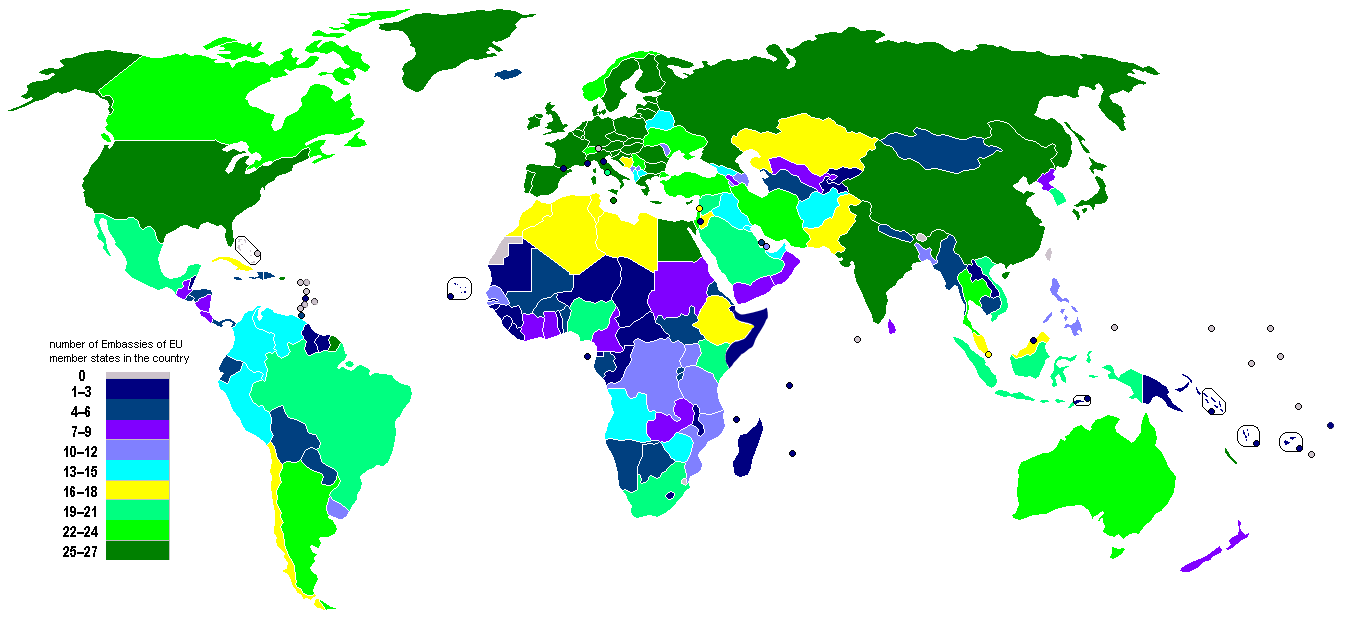
Map of countries coloured according to the number of EU members embassies

The EU member states have their own diplomatic missions, in addition to the common EU delegations. On the other hand, additionally to the third-state delegations and offices the European Commission maintains representation in each of the member states. Where the EU delegations have not taken on their full Lisbon Treaty responsibilities, the national embassy of the country holding the rotating EU presidency has the role of representing the CFSP while the EU (formerly the commission) delegation speaks only for the commission.

Member state missions have certain responsibilities to national of fellow states. Consulates are obliged to support EU citizens of other states abroad if they do not have a consulate of their own state in the country. Also, if another EU state makes a request to help their citizens in an emergency then they are obliged to assist. An example would be evacuations where EU states help assist each other's citizens.

== Relations by counterpart ==
=== Diplomatic relations ===
List of countries which the European Union maintains diplomatic relations with by date:

#	Country	Date
1	United States	3 February 1958
2	United Kingdom	15 December 1959
3	Canada	29 December 1959
4	Brazil	24 May 1960
5	Israel	13 June 1960
6	Australia	14 June 1960
7	Morocco	26 July 1960
8	Mexico	30 November 1960
9	Norway	1 December 1960
10	Japan	24 February 1961
11	Peru	25 January 1961
12	Senegal	10 March 1961
13	Gabon	21 March 1961
14	Ivory Coast	29 April 1961
15	Mauritania	3 May 1961
16	Togo	3 May 1961
17	Somalia	5 May 1961
18	Colombia	6 July 1961
19	Chad	10 July 1961
20	South Africa	18 July 1961
21	Democratic Republic of the Congo	19 July 1961
22	New Zealand	27 July 1961
23	Madagascar	3 August 1961
24	Benin	23 October 1961
25	Burkina Faso	23 October 1961
26	India	27 January 1962
27	Central African Republic	14 February 1962
28	Iran	20 March 1962
29	Niger	22 March 1962
30	Cameroon	11 April 1962
31	Sri Lanka	3 May 1962
32	Dominican Republic	10 July 1962
33	Republic of the Congo	8 August 1962
34	Thailand	28 August 1962
35	Chile	1 October 1962
36	Lebanon	1 October 1962
37	Pakistan	1 October 1962
38	Tunisia	30 October 1962
39	Argentina	8 November 1962
40	Burundi	6 December 1962
41	Costa Rica	14 December 1962
42	Rwanda	21 February 1963
43	Uruguay	22 February 1963
44	Iceland	1 April 1963
45	Nigeria	18 July 1963
46	Venezuela	18 July 1963
47	Haiti	19 July 1963
48	Switzerland	29 October 1963
49	South Korea	24 July 1963
50	Turkey	9 August 1963
51	Mali	13 September 1963
52	Philippines	12 May 1964
53	Algeria	14 May 1964
54	El Salvador	9 April 1965
55	Trinidad and Tobago	5 July 1965
56	Guatemala	29 July 1965
57	Panama	20 April 1966
58	Sudan	27 September 1966
59	Paraguay	24 November 1966
60	Saudi Arabia	10 May 1967
61	Kenya	9 March 1968
62	Tanzania	9 March 1968
63	Ghana	5 April 1968
64	Uganda	30 May 1968
65	Libya	16 July 1968
66	Malaysia	26 September 1968
67	Serbia	26 September 1968
68	Indonesia	5 November 1968
69	Egypt	10 December 1968
—	Holy See	10 November 1970
70	Ethiopia	26 November 1970
71	Syria	26 November 1970
72	Iraq	30 March 1971
73	Ecuador	10 May 1971
74	Sierra Leone	11 May 1971
75	Mauritius	11 May 1971
76	Jamaica	27 July 1971
77	Jordan	21 September 1971
78	Fiji	9 November 1971
79	Malawi	9 November 1971
80	Singapore	20 July 1972
81	Botswana	5 February 1973
82	Guyana	13 April 1973
83	Yemen	13 April 1973
84	Myanmar	13 April 1973
85	Honduras	29 May 1973
86	Gambia	13 June 1973
87	Bangladesh	24 July 1973
88	Barbados	21 September 1973
89	Eswatini	18 December 1973
90	Liberia	3 December 1974
91	Lesotho	20 January 1975
92	Nepal	20 January 1975
93	China	6 May 1975
94	Bolivia	15 July 1975
95	Laos	21 November 1975
96	Suriname	19 July 1976
97	Qatar	5 April 1977
98	Guinea	25 July 1977
99	Tonga	25 July 1977
100	Guinea-Bissau	26 July 1977
101	Afghanistan	21 November 1977
102	Zambia	21 November 1977
103	Seychelles	15 March 1978
104	Djibouti	20 November 1979
105	Solomon Islands	20 November 1979
106	Papua New Guinea	18 December 1979
107	Cape Verde	5 February 1980
108	Oman	18 March 1980
109	Nicaragua	18 March 1980
110	Angola	29 May 1980
111	Grenada	23 July 1980
112	Equatorial Guinea	16 December 1980
113	Zimbabwe	17 February 1981
114	Comoros	5 May 1982
115	United Arab Emirates	14 December 1982
116	Maldives	22 February 1983
117	São Tomé and Príncipe	22 February 1983
118	San Marino	1 February 1983
119	Belize	6 October 1983
120	Dominica	23 January 1984
121	Antigua and Barbuda	21 February 1984
122	Saint Lucia	21 February 1984
123	Samoa	21 May 1985
124	Mozambique	25 July 1985
125	Bhutan	9 August 1985
126	Kuwait	3 March 1986
127	Bahamas	16 September 1986
128	Saint Vincent and the Grenadines	12 July 1988
129	Cuba	29 September 1988
130	Russia	2 March 1989
131	Brunei	14 June 1989
132	Mongolia	1 August 1989
133	Vietnam	28 November 1990
134	Namibia	8 February 1991
135	Albania	20 June 1991
136	Azerbaijan	27 February 1992
137	Cambodia	6 April 1992
138	Armenia	10 August 1992
139	Belarus	10 August 1992
140	Kazakhstan	9 February 1993
141	Kyrgyzstan	1 April 1993
142	Bosnia and Herzegovina	4 April 1993
143	Ukraine	23 April 1993
144	Georgia	29 July 1993
145	Liechtenstein	14 October 1993
146	Moldova	11 April 1994
147	Eritrea	17 October 1994
148	Uzbekistan	16 November 1994
149	Andorra	5 April 1995
150	Saint Kitts and Nevis	10 April 1995
151	North Macedonia	29 December 1995
152	Turkmenistan	11 November 1997
153	Monaco	29 October 1999
154	Palau	28 March 2000
155	North Korea	14 May 2001
156	Tajikistan	29 January 2002
—	Cook Islands	25 March 2002
—	Niue	25 March 2002
157	Federated States of Micronesia	10 April 2002
158	Timor-Leste	20 May 2002
159	Bahrain	31 August 2004
160	Montenegro	4 December 2006
—	Sovereign Military Order of Malta	June 2007
161	Vanuatu	20 November 2007
162	Tuvalu	8 December 2008
163	South Sudan	28 February 2012
164	Kiribati	22 January 2018
165	Marshall Islands	22 July 2021
166	Nauru	12 August 2024

=== International organizations ===
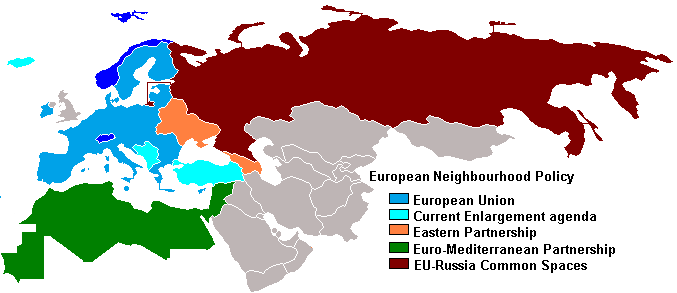
EU regional initivatives; current enlargement agenda (SAP and candidate countries), ENP; Eastern Partnership, Euromediterranean Partnership and EU-Russia Common Spaces.

The Union as a whole is increasingly representing its members in international organisations. Aside from EU-centric organisations (mentioned above) the EU, or the Community, is represented in a number of organisations:

- full rights member: the G8;, the World Trade Organization;
- partner: the International Development Association; Pacific Islands Forum; the Pacific Community (SPC)
- dialogue member: the ASEAN Regional Forum, the South Asian Association for Regional Cooperation
- observer: the United Nations, the Organization of American States, the Council of the Baltic Sea States; the Australia Group; the European Organization for Nuclear Research; the Food and Agriculture Organization, the European Bank for Reconstruction and Development, the G10, the Non-Aligned Movement; Nuclear Suppliers Group; the Organisation for Economic Co-operation and Development; the United Nations Relief and Works Agency for Palestine Refugees in the Near East; and the Zangger Committee

The EU is also one of part of the Quartet on the Middle East, represented by the High Representative. At the UN, some officials see the EU moving towards a single seat on the UN Security Council.

The European Union is expected to accede to the European Convention on Human Rights (the convention). In 2005, the leaders of the Council of Europe reiterated their desire for the EU to accede without delay to ensure consistent human rights protection across Europe. There are also concerns about consistency in case law – the European Court of Justice (the EU's supreme court) is already treating the convention as though it was part of the EU's legal system to prevent conflict between its judgements and those of the European Court of Human Rights (the court interpreting the convention). Protocol No.14 of the convention is designed to allow the EU to accede to it and the Treaty of Lisbon contains a protocol binding the EU to joining. The EU would not be subordinate to the council, but would be subject to its human rights law and external monitoring as its member states are currently. It is further proposed that the EU join as a member of the Council once it has attained its legal personality in the Treaty of Lisbon.

Where the EU itself isn't represented, or when it is only an observer, the EU treaties places certain duties on member states;

1. Member States shall coordinate their action in international organisations and at international conferences. They shall uphold the Union's positions in such forums. The High Representative of the Union for Foreign Affairs and Security Policy shall organise this coordination.

In international organisations and at international conferences where not all the Member States participate, those which do take part shall uphold the Union's positions.

2. In accordance with Article 24(3), Member States represented in international organisations or international conferences where not all the Member States participate shall keep the other Member States and the High Representative informed of any matter of common interest.

Member States which are also members of the United Nations Security Council will concert and keep the other Member States and the High Representative fully informed. Member States which are members of the Security Council will, in the execution of their functions, defend the positions and the interests of the Union, without prejudice to their responsibilities under the provisions of the United Nations Charter.

When the Union has defined a position on a subject which is on the United Nations Security Council agenda, those Member States which sit on the Security Council shall request that the High Representative be invited to present the Union's position.

— Article 34, Treaty on European Union, as amended by the Lisbon Treaty

=== ACP countries ===
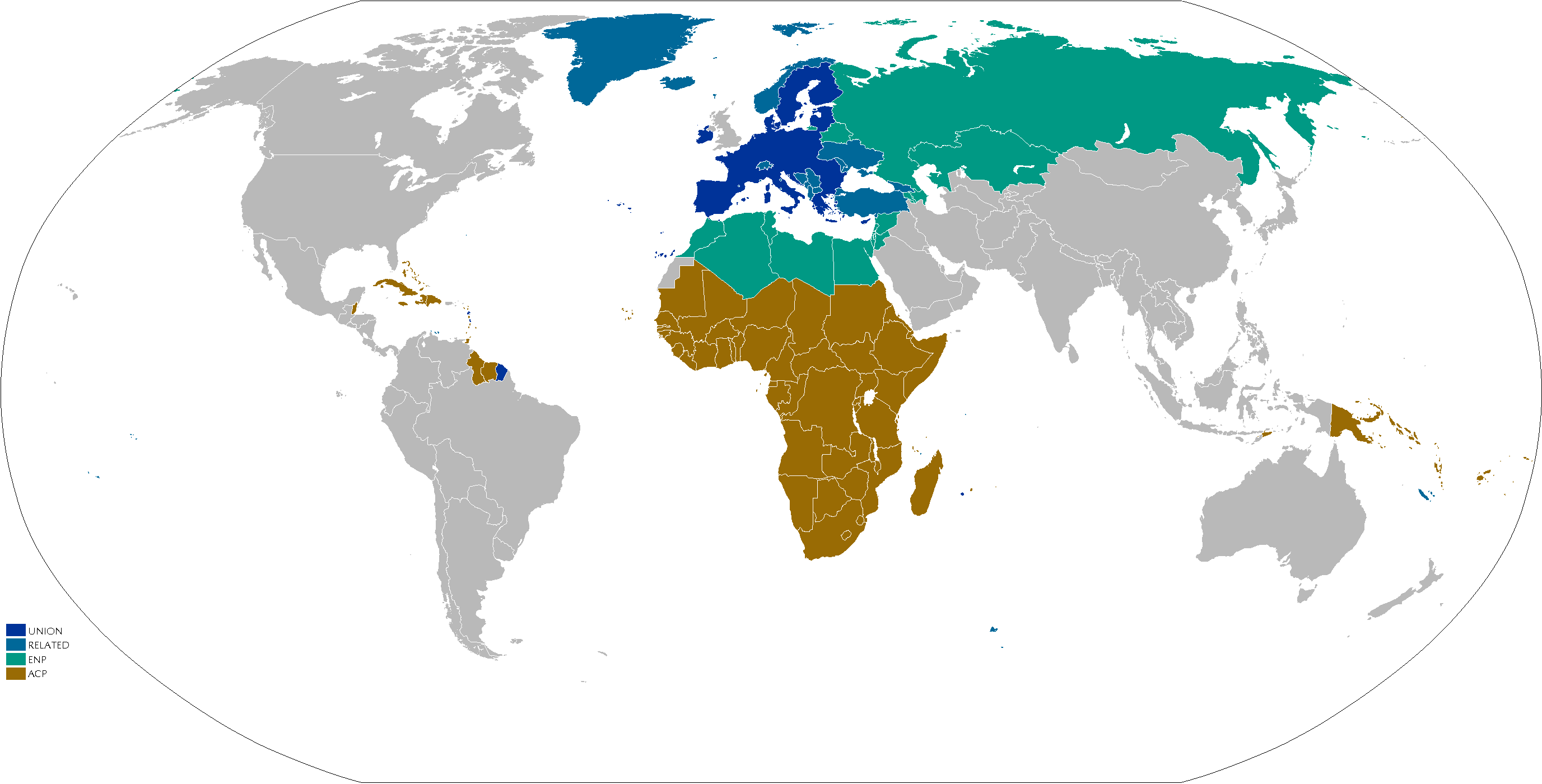
The EU, related countries (EFTA countries + potential and recognized candidates), ENP countries, and ACP countries

The European Union's member-states retain close links with many of their former colonies and since the Treaty of Rome there has been a relationship between the Union and the African, Caribbean and Pacific (ACP) countries in the form of ACP-EU Development Cooperation including a joint parliamentary assembly.

The EU is also a leading provider of humanitarian aid, with over 20% of aid received in the ACP coming from the EU budget or from the European Development Fund (EDF).

In April 2007 the Commission offered ACP countries greater access to the EU market; tariff-free rice exports with duty- and quota-free sugar exports. However this offer is being fought by France who, along with other countries, wish to dilute the offer.

There are questions as to whether the special relationship between the ACP group and the European Union will be maintained after the coming to the end of the Cotonou Partnership Agreement Treaty in 2020. The ACP has begun looking into the future of the group and its relationship to the European Union. Independent think tanks such as the European Centre for Development Policy Management (ECDPM) have also presented various scenarios for the future of the ACP group in itself and in relation to the European Union.

=== Africa and the Middle East ===
Country	Formal relations began	Notes
Algeria	1995	Main article: Algeria–European Union relations Algeria was part of many different empires and dynasties in its history before it became independent in 1962. The EU-Algeria Association Agreement of 2002, which came into force in 2005, laid the foundations for cooperation in several areas. Among other things, tariffs were almost completely abolished by the end of 2020. In 2017, new common objectives of the EU and Algeria were defined and adopted. Algeria is part of the Union for the Mediterranean which laid the foundation for a freetrade area for goods between the EU and all of the member countries. The EU was Algeria's most important trading partner in 2019, accounting for nearly half of the country's international trade. Furthermore, the EU supports Algeria in joining the WTO since 2014.
Bahrain	1988	Main article: Bahrain–European Union relations In 2021 Bahrain signed, as most of the other gulf states, a Cooperation Agreement that aims to intensify cooperation with the EU on a political and economic level. Moreover, with its fellow GCC members it takes part in projects promoting diplomatic cooperation, renewable energies, economic diversification and cultural exchange. In January 2021, a joint letter concerning the deterioration of the human rights situation in Bahrain was written to the European Union. The letter was undersigned by the human rights and advocacy groups from around the world, including ADHRB, Amnesty International, Freedom House, CIVICUS, PEN International, etc. The EU members were demanded to address the deteriorating condition of human rights in Bahrain with the Bahraini delegation expected to visit Brussels on 10 February 2021, for an EU-Bahrain interactive human rights dialogue. The letter called out the arbitrary detention of journalists for their critical work in Bahrain, unfair prosecution of defense lawyers, human rights defenders, and opposition leaders, death penalty, and mistreatment of prisoners. The European External Action Services (EEAS) acknowledged the letter on 25 January 2021.
Gulf Cooperation Council CCASG (GCC): Cooperation Council for the Arab States of the Gulf (Organisation)	1988	Main article: Gulf Cooperation Council The foundation of the relationship between the European Union and the Gulf region was laid in 1988, when the Gulf Cooperation Council (including Saudi Arabia, Bahrain, Kuwait, Oman, Qatar and the United Arab Emirates) signed the Cooperation Agreement with the EU. The objective of this treaty is the intensification of relations, mainly in political and economic sectors and research. Today, exchange between the EU and the GCC takes place on many different levels; diplomatically, economically and culturally. The economic relations between the EU and the GCC are of crucial importance for both sides, illustrated by the fact that the EU is the second largest trading partner of the Gulf region, after China. In 2018 the "EU-GCC Dialogue on Economic Diversification" project was established, which is supposed to strengthen economic exchange with a focus on the diversification of the gulf's economy. The European Green Deal, which could be seen as a threat to the Gulf state's fossil fuel depended economy, has lately also been perceived as an opportunity to prepare for the post-oil era. For this purpose, the UG-GCC clean energy network was founded in 2010, which is a partnership focused on increasing renewable and clean energy in both regions. In 2020 the political and diplomatic partnership was renewed and intensified through the "Enhanced EU-GCC Political Dialogue, Cooperation and Outreach" treaty. On a cultural level, projects such as Erasmus+ promote cultural exchange between the regions and enable students and young people to study and research abroad. The EU and GCC have strengthened their partnership in recent years, particularly in energy and environmental cooperation. While the EU is a significant trading partner for the GCC, energy exports to Europe, including oil and liquefied natural gas, remain smaller compared to those directed toward Asia. The European Green Deal, which aims for carbon neutrality by 2050, has created opportunities for collaboration on renewable energy and clean technologies. Initiatives such as the EU-GCC Clean Energy Network, established in 2010, highlight efforts to align Europe’s energy diversification strategies with the Gulf’s economic diversification goals. As the EU reduces its reliance on Russian energy imports, the GCC is positioned to play a more prominent role as an energy supplier and partner in advancing sustainable energy systems.
Cape Verde		Main article: Cape Verde–European Union relations
Egypt	1966	Main article: Egypt–European Union relations In 2004 the Association Agreement came into effect, which laid the foundation for future cooperation between the EU and Egypt. Moreover, a free trade area was established, which the EU aims to intensify further. In 2024 trade between Egypt and the EU was worth 32.5 billion EUR, which makes the EU Egypt's main trading partner. Furthermore, both cooperate within the Union for the Mediterranean. In 2017 the terms of the partnership were revised, due to the new European Neighborhood policy. Egypt and the EU agreed on distinct guidelines that should shape the relationship until 2020. Therein, they focused on the Egyptian "Sustainable Development Strategy – Vision 2030" and emphasized their shared values of human rights and democracy. At large, the partnership focuses on the promotion of societal prosperity and justice, for example in terms of education and healthcare, as well as in regard to the protection of minority groups. Another core theme is the funding of economic development, for instance in the form of investment into renewable energies with the goal to enhance sustainability. When it comes to foreign policy, the EU and Egypt seek to follow a joint agenda, which aims at stabilizing the Mediterranean region, as well as the Middle East and Africa. This includes tackling economic and political issues, such as combating radicalisation and terrorism. Furthermore, the EU intends to intensify its cooperation with the League of Arab States (LAS), which is hosted by Egypt.
Iraq		Main article: Iraq–European Union relations Prior to 2003 the EU and Iraq had barely any political connection or cooperation, since the relation was mostly characterised by distrust. The overthrow of the Saddam Hussein regime in March 2003 however changed this; the EU now plays an increasingly active role in the Middle Eastern country. In the time period between 2003 and 2018 the EU spent around 3 billion euros on financial support for Iraq. For instance, they established projects concerned with improving the trade relations and cultural ties between the EU and Iraq. Furthermore, the EU is involved with providing humanitarian aid, improving the human rights situation in Iraq and supports the further development of sustainable energies and the educational system. On the other hand, the start of the Iraq war in 2003 also revealed large disunity between the EU member states concerning the United States’ military intervention in Iraq. This made a coherent and mutual foreign policy towards the situation in Iraq difficult.
Iran		Main article: Iran–European Union relations Due to Iran's nuclear programme there are several sanctions in place against the country, which regulate and complicate trade. Prior to the implementation of these sanctions, the EU was the most important trading partner of Iran, although the two parties have no trade agreement. In connection with JCPOA, which was signed in 2015 and to which the EU belongs, some sanctions were eased in contrast there were stricter conditions for Iran's nuclear program. With the withdrawal of the U.S. in 2019, sanctions came into force again but some EU states partially bypassed them through the specially established INSTEX. Also, the EU supports Iran in the attempt to become a WTO member. On 1 March 2026, following the death of Supreme Leader Ali Khamenei in a joint U.S.-Israeli military campaign, European Commission President Ursula von der Leyen called for a "credible transition" in Iran. While acknowledging significant risks to Europe from the resulting war, she stated that "no tears should be shed" for the Iranian regime.
Israel	1995	Main article: Israel–European Union relations In 1995 Israel became a member of the EUs Southern Neighborhood. Trade between the EU and Israel is conducted on the basis of the Association Agreement, which came into effect in 2000. The European Union is Israel's major trading partner. In 2004 the total volume of bilateral trade (excluding diamonds) came to over €15 billion. 33% of Israel's exports went to the EU and almost 40% of its imports came from the EU. Under the Euro-Mediterranean Agreement from 2000, the EU and Israel agreed on free trade regarding industrial products. The two sides have granted each other significant trade concessions for certain agricultural products, in the form of tariff reduction or elimination, either within quotas or for unlimited quantities. However, goods from Israeli settlements in the Israeli-occupied territories are not subjected to the free trade agreement, as they are not considered Israeli. In 2009, a German court solicited the European Court of Justice for a binding ruling on whether goods manufactured in Israeli settlements in the Israeli-occupied territories should fall under duty exemptions in the Association Agreement. The German government stated as its position that there can be no exemption from customs duty for "goods from the occupied territories". The court, agreeing with the German government, ruled in February 2010 that settlement goods were not entitled to preferential treatment under the customs rules of the EU-Israel Association Agreement, and allowed the EU to impose import duties on settlement products. In December 2009, the Council of the European Union endorsed a set of conclusions on the Israeli–Palestinian conflict which forms the basis of present EU policy. It reasserted the objective of a two-state solution, and stressed that the union "will not recognise any changes to the pre-1967 borders including with regard to Jerusalem, other than those agreed by the parties." It recalled that the EU "has never recognised the annexation of East Jerusalem" and that the State of Palestine must have its capital in Jerusalem. A year later, in December 2010, the Council reiterated these conclusions and announced its readiness, when appropriate, to recognise a Palestinian state, but encouraged a return to negotiations. Eight of its then 27 member states had recognised the State of Palestine. In 2020 Israel was the EU's 24th biggest trading partner and the EU was the most important trading partner of Israel.
Jordan	1995	Main article: Jordan–European Union relations Jordan has been a member of the EUs Southern Neighborhood Programme since 1995 and in this context received 765 million euros in the period between 2014 and 2016. A free trade agreement between Jordan and the EU entered into force in 2002. The EU was Jordan's most important trading partner in 2020 and also the largest foreign investor.
Kuwait	1988	Main article: Foreign relations of Kuwait Exchange and cooperation between Kuwait and the EU have intensified since July 2016, after the completion of the EEAS agreement (Cooperation Agreement with the European External Action Service). In terms of economic connections, the EU is of major importance to Kuwait and constitutes Kuwait's third biggest trading partner.
Lebanon		Main article: Lebanon–European Union relations In 2002, an agreement was concluded between the EU and Lebanon which guarantees free trade for certain goods. The EU was Lebanon's most important trading partner in 2020. Since 1999, Lebanon has been trying to join the WTO, which the EU supports. Lebanon is a member of the Southern Neighborhood and the Union for the Mediterranean. Moreover, the EU also supports democracy and security in Lebanon among other issues.
Libya		Main article: Libya–European Union relations Libya is a member of the Southern Neighborhood, but has, unlike the other member states, no free trade agreement with the EU. Libya is also not a member of the Union for the Mediterranean, but functions as an observer since 1999. Prior to the 2011 Libyan civil war, the EU and Libya were negotiating a cooperation agreement which has now been frozen. The EU worked to apply sanctions over the Libyan conflict, provide aid and some members participated in military action. Since 2016, the EU has been working closely with the Libyan Coast Guard to regulate flight routes across the Mediterranean towards the EUs external border. Human rights organizations accuse the parties involved in this cooperation of serious crimes, including crimes against humanity. Since 2016 the EU Global Strategy puts a special focus on the North African countries, of which Libya is often seen playing an important role for prosperity and security in the Mediterranean region. In 2020 the EU was Libya's most important trade partner.
Mauritius		In 2026, the EU and Mauritius held discussions concerning the future of the fishing access in waters surrounding the Chagos Archipelago during ongoing negotiations over the territory’s sovereignty. Reporting by The Daily Telegraph journalist Mitchell Durdin cited internal EU documents stating that the arrangement could increase European access to Indian Ocean fishing ground.
Morocco	1960	Main article: Morocco–European Union relations A free trade area between the EU and Morocco was concluded in 1996 and extended in 2019. The trade relations between Morocco and the EU are very close, in 2020 Morocco constituted the 20th most important trading partner of the EU. The EU on the other hand is Morocco's most important trading partner, with over half of its imports and exports going to and coming from EU states. Furthermore, the EU was the biggest foreign investor in the country in 2020. Morocco is the largest partner of all Southern Neighborhood member states, of which it has been a member since 1995.
Oman	1988	Main article: Foreign relations of Oman The relationship between the EU and Oman focuses on the energy sector and maritime security, for example in combating piracy in Africa. In 2018 the Cooperation Agreement was signed, which is supposed to strengthen economic exchange, with an emphasis on controlling illegal fishing, and promoting clean energy and non-oil exports.
Palestine	1975	Main article: Palestine–European Union relations Relations between the European Union and the Palestine Liberation Organisation (PLO) were established in 1975 as part of the Euro-Arab Dialogue. The EU is a member of the Quartet and is the single largest donor of foreign aid to Palestinians. Palestine has been a member of the EU Southern Neighborhood since 1995. The EU maintains a representative office in Ramallah, accredited to the PNA. The PLO's general delegation in Brussels, accredited to the EU, was first established as an information and liaison bureau in September 1976. Other representations are maintained in almost every European capital, many of which have been accorded full diplomatic status. In western Europe, Spain was the first country granting diplomatic status to a PLO representative, followed later by Portugal, Austria, France, Italy and Greece. The EU has insisted that it will not recognise any changes to the 1967 borders other than those agreed between the parties. Israel's settlement program has therefore led to some tensions, and EU states consider these settlements illegal under international law. In July 2009, EU foreign policy chief Javier Solana called for the United Nations to recognise the Palestinian state by a set deadline even if a settlement had not been reached: "The mediator has to set the timetable. If the parties are not able to stick to it, then a solution backed by the international community should ... be put on the table. After a fixed deadline, a UN Security Council resolution ... would accept the Palestinian state as a full member of the UN, and set a calendar for implementation." In 2011, the Palestinian government called on the EU to recognise the State of Palestine in a United Nations resolution scheduled for 20 September. EU member states grew divided over the issue. Some, including Spain, France and the United Kingdom, stating that they might recognise if talks did not progress, while others, including Germany and Italy, refused. Catherine Ashton said that the EU position would depend on the wording of the proposal. At the end of August, Israel's defence minister Ehud Barak told Ashton that Israel was seeking to influence the wording: "It is very important that all the players come up with a text that will emphasise the quick return to negotiations, without an effort to impose pre-conditions on the sides." Trade is very much affected and restricted by the ongoing conflict between Israel and Palestine. In May 2026, the European Union agreed to impose sanctions on Israeli settlers in the West Bank in response to violence against Palestinians. The same decision included additional restrictive measures against leaders of Hamas.
Qatar	1988	Generally speaking, the main sectors of cooperation between the EU and Qatar are military defense, economic exchange and energy. In 2018 the 1988 agreement was renewed by Qatar and the EU through the completion of a new EEAS Cooperation Agreement which aims at intensifying political exchange and puts a focus on development and innovation. In terms of politics and crisis handling the European Union has failed to take over a position of leverage and mediation in regional conflicts in the Gulf region and therefore the region, and especially Qatar, instead continues to focus on the US as their main partner in political and economic terms. In 2022, four people were arrested because of corruption. This came to be known as the Qatar corruption scandal at the European Parliament. In May 2025, Qatar threatened to halt LNG deliveries to Europe if the European Union continued with proposed regulations linking trade to human rights and environmental standards.
Saudi Arabia	1988	Main article: Foreign relations of Saudi Arabia The first embassy of the European Union was established in Riyadh in 2004. In October 2021 a Cooperation Agreement was signed, which emphasizes the regions’ cooperation in political and technical sectors and schedules a yearly exchange meeting between senior officials. The EUNIC cluster (European Union National Institutes for Culture) has been active since 2021 and supports cultural exchange. In terms of economic cooperation, the EU is of major importance, since it is, after China, Saudi Arabia's 2nd biggest trading partner and imports Saudi Arabian oil and chemicals. Geopolitically, Saudi Arabia does not consider the European Union to be a main player and orients itself more towards the US. An exemption of this are France and the United Kingdom, who are, for historic reasons and due to their seats in the UN Security Council, of particular importance for Saudi Arabia. Moreover, Germany is increasingly mentioned as an important partner as well. Criticism about human rights violations in the country, voiced by EU member states, have complicated the diplomatic relationship, even though the criticism itself had little influence on Saudi Arabian politics.
South Africa		Main article: South Africa–European Union relations South Africa has strong cultural and historical links to the European Union (EU) (particularly through immigration from the Netherlands, the United Kingdom (a former member), Germany, France, and Greece) and the EU is South Africa's biggest investor. Since the end of South Africa's apartheid, EU South African relations have flourished and they began a "Strategic Partnership" in 2007. In 1999 the two sides signed a Trade, Development and Cooperation Agreement (TDCA) which entered into force in 2004, with some provisions being applied from 2000. The TDCA covered a wide range of issues from political cooperation, development and the establishment of a free trade area (FTA). South Africa is the EU's largest trading partner in Southern Africa and has a FTA with the EU. South Africa's main exports to the EU are fuels and mining products (27%), machinery and transport equipment (18%) and other semi-manufactured goods (16%). However they are growing and becoming more diverse. European exports to South Africa are primarily machinery & transport equipment (50%), chemicals (15%) and other semi-machinery (10%).
South Sudan	2012	Main article: Foreign relations of South Sudan The EU is one of South Sudan's main partners in sectors such as trade, political relationships, peacekeeping and humanitarian aid. It supported the country after its declaration of independence in 2011. Following the outbreak of the civil war in 2013, the EU abandoned their civil mission EUAVSEC (European Union Aviation Security CSDP Mission in South Sudan) and since has not renewed it. Nevertheless, the EU has supported South Sudan in many different areas since the beginning of the crisis. For instance, the EU Parliament has condemned human rights violations in the country in the context of the civil war. Furthermore, the EU supports the IGAD and has provided 1 billion Euro of humanitarian aid since 2011. It supported the peace process in the country in the form of the development of the RARCSS (Revitalized Agreement on the Resolution of Conflict in South Sudan). In 2014 the EU also implemented an arms embargo targeting both Sudan and South Sudan. Following the COVID-19 crisis in 2020, the EU aided the country through financial and material support.
Sudan	1975	Main article: Sudan–European Union relations The focus of the EU's work in Sudan lies on peacekeeping, humanitarian, health and educational projects with an emphasis on supporting Sudan's democratic tranisition. The EU and Sudan take part in ongoing negotiations concerning an Economic Partnership Agreement (EPA). The Multiannual Indicative Programme (MIP) predefines humanitarian and peacekeeping work in the country between 2021 and 2027. In 2022 alone, the EU supported Sudan with 40 million Euro of humanitarian aid, for instance in the form of financial assistance during the COVID-19 crisis. In 2021 the EU officially condemned the military coup d'état in Sudan and announced serious consequences targeting its financial aid. Following riots in 2022, the EU, again, convicted ongoing human rights violations in the country, especially violent attacks by the military against protesters.
Syria	1977	Main article: Syria–European Union relations In 1977 the foundations for relations between the EU and Syria were laid through the implementation of the Cooperation Agreement which targeted cooperation in financial and economic sectors and development. The EU-Syria Association Agreement from 1978 was supposed to further intensify exchange between the countries, but was never officially approved by the Syrian regime. In 2007 the Country Strategy Paper (CSP) was implemented, which shaped the relationship between the EU and Syria up until 2013 and focused on political, economic and social reforms. Despite the non-democratic character of the Syrian government, the EU upheld its trade relations with the state without addressing continuing human rights violations. Even though EU member states kept tolerating the Assad regime during the uprisings in March 2011, they later demanded Bashar al-Assad to step down and enable the democratisation of Syria. Following the escalation of the protests into a civil war, the EU imposed economic and military sanctions and ended its diplomatic relationships with Syria with the goal of changing the regime. The Syrian government managed to circumvent most of these sanctions by diversifying its trade relationships and importing arms from other non-EU states. In 2013 a disagreement between EU member states about whether Syrian rebel groups should be supported, resulted in relieving oppositional groups from the arm embargo. The western approach towards to Syrian crisis changed in 2014 when the terror organisation ISIS gained power. The EU shifted its focus from the Assad regime towards the fight against the Islamic State due to increasing security concerns. Actions implemented by the EU included humanitarian aid and support for the rebel groups. Even though the EU states never actively took part in military actions in Syria, they supported already existing oppositional groups in Syria and the US-led coalition through financial and material assistance. The US’ military cooperation with the PYD/YPG brought the EU into a difficult situation. Since Turkey recognises the PYD as a terror group, EU states were worried it could threaten their relationship to Turkey. The influx of multiple million Syrian refugees into the EU, especially in 2015, led to disunion between European states concerning the allocation of the migrants. In March 2021 the EU, in cooperation with the UN, approved a new aid package of 5.3 EUR billion targeted at improving the humanitarian situation in Syria and its neighbour countries. Sanctions on the Syrian government and Syrian individuals will stay in place until at least 1 June 2022.
Tunisia		Main article: Tunisia–European Union relations Tunisia was the first Mediterranean country to sign an association agreement with the EU and fully implement it, enabling a free trade area, in 1998. It participates in the Union for the Mediterranean and has signed a dispute mechanism agreement with the EU. While the EU is of major importance for the Tunisian economy, constituting its largest trading partner in 2020, Tunisia only accounted for 0,5% of European foreign trade. Furthermore, Tunisia and the EU are in constant negotiations to deepen the cooperation and relations between the countries.
United Arab Emirates		Issues such as anti-terrorism and maritime security have become an increasingly important part of the partnership between the EU and the United Arab Emirates (UAE). The country hosts secretariats of different EU projects, such as the CBRN center. In economic terms, trade between the regions adds up to US$55 billion, which makes the EU UAE's largest trading partner. Even though the UAE uphold important diplomatic relations, specifically to France, the United Kingdom and Germany, the EU itself is often perceived as disunited, indecisive and slow-reacting. Especially the European Union's inaction on security issues in the Middle Eastern region is often criticized by the UAE. Nevertheless, Europe continues to influence the region on a cultural and educational level. In 2021 the European parliament passed a resolution condemning human rights violations by the government of the UAE and demanded the release of multiple human rights activists who had been imprisoned. The Arab league subsequently questioned the EU's right to judge the political situation in Middle Eastern countries.
Western Sahara		Further information: Morocco–European Union relations In 2017, Federica Mogherini, the foreign minister of the European Union stirred controversy and diplomatic confusion over her statement that the trade agreements between Morocco and the EU would not be affected by the 2016 ruling by the European Court of Justice on the scope of trade with Morocco. This ruling confirmed that bilateral trade deals, such as the EU–Morocco Fisheries Partnership Agreement, covers only agricultural produce and fishing products originating within the internationally recognized borders of Morocco, thus explicitly excluding any product sourced from Western Sahara or its territorial waters. The international community, including the EU, unanimously rejects Morocco's territorial claim to Western Sahara.
Yemen		Main article: Yemen–European Union relations The EU is currently active in Yemen in the fields of conflict resolution, development aid and humanitarian aid concerning the Yemeni Civil War, and is one of the most important donor countries in favour of Yemen. However, there are also accusations that EU states such as Germany or France export weapons to countries that are allied with Yemen and that these weapons are also used in the Yemeni conflict.

=== The Americas ===
Country	Formal relations began	Notes
Argentina		Main article: Argentina–European Union relations
Barbados		The European Union relations and cooperation with Barbados are carried out both on a bilateral and a Caribbean-regional basis. Barbados is party to the Cotonou Agreement, through which As of December 2007 it is linked by an Economic Partnership Agreement with the European Commission. The pact involves the Caribbean Forum (CARIFORUM) subgroup of the African, Caribbean and Pacific Group of States (ACP). CARIFORUM is the only part of the wider ACP-bloc that has concluded the full regional trade-pact with the European Union. There are also ongoing EU-Community of Latin American and Caribbean States (CELAC) and EU-CARIFORUM dialogues. The Mission of Barbados to the European Union is located in Brussels, while the Delegation of the European Union to Barbados and its regional neighbors is in Bridgetown.
Brazil		Main article: Brazil–European Union relations
Canada		Main article: Canada–European Union relations Canada's relationship with Europe is based upon historic connections developed from mass European immigration to Canada. Canada became settled by French-speakers, and after 1763 was formally comprised a part of the British Empire after its capture in the Seven Years' War. The United Kingdom has since held extremely close relations with Canada, due to its paralleling and subsequent British colonial past and both being realms of the Commonwealth; along with participation in France's Organisation internationale de la Francophonie. Historically, Canada's relations with the UK and USA were usually over relations with continental Europe. Nevertheless, Canada had existing ties with European countries through the Western alliance during the Second World War, the United Nations, and NATO before the creation of the European Economic Community. The history of Canada's relations with the EU is best documented in a series of economic agreements: In 1976 the European Economic Community (EEC) and Canada signed a Framework Agreement on Economic Co-operation, the first formal agreement of its kind between the EEC and an industrialized third country.; Also in 1976 the Delegation of the European Commission to Canada opened in Ottawa.; In 1990 European and Canadian leaders adopted a Declaration on Transatlantic Relations, extending the scope of their contacts and establishing regular meetings at Summit and Ministerial level.; in 1992 Canada and France had their maritime dispute settled by arbitral tribunal concerning seabeds around the French territory of Saint Pierre and Miquelon.; In 1996, a new Political Declaration on EU-Canada Relations was made at the Ottawa Summit, adopting a joint Action Plan identifying additional specific areas for co-operation.; In 2017, the European Union and Canadian Federal Government signed a framework deal called the EU–Canada Comprehensive Economic and Trade Agreement (CETA); In 2022, Canada and the Kingdom of Denmark settled a long standing dispute over Hans Island near Greenland.
Caribbean (region)		The independent countries of the Caribbean region (Namely the Caribbean Community (CARICOM) + Dominican Republic are known by the European Union as CARIFORUM (under the Lomé Convention and Cotonou Agreement). CARIFORUM makes up one of three parts of the African, Caribbean and Pacific Group of States. CARIFORUM remains the only region of the A.C.P. to have concluded with the E.U. an Economic Partnership Agreement. Under the EPA, the E.U. maintains an active joint ACP–EU Joint Parliamentary Assembly.
Colombia		Main article: Colombia–European Union relations
Cuba		Main article: Cuba–European Union relations
Latin America (region)		The Union has been developing ties with other regional bodies such as the Andean Community and Mercosur, with plans for association agreements between the EU and the two other blocs underway to help trade, research, democracy and human rights. Chile and Mexico have an Association Agreement with the EU. A 2.6-billion euro financial package for Latin America was also put forward with 840-million euro for Central America. A major forum for European relations with Latin America is the Latin America, the Caribbean and the European Union Summit, a biannual meeting of heads of state and government held since 1999.
Greenland		Main article: Greenland and the European Union Greenland is an autonomous territory of an EU member state, but lies outside of the EU, and hence although it is not part of the EU, it has strong ties to it.
Mexico		Main article: Mexico–European Union relations
United States		Main article: European Union–United States relations The European Union and the United States have held diplomatic relations since 1953. The two Unions play leading roles in international political relations, and what one says matters a great deal not only to the other, but to much of the rest of the world. And yet they have regularly disagreed with each other on a wide range of specific issues, as well as having often quite different political, economic, and social agendas. Understanding the relationship today means reviewing developments that predate the creation of the European Economic Community (precursor to today's European Union) Euro-American relations are primarily concerned with trade policy. The EU is a near-fully unified trade bloc and this, together with competition policy, are the primary matters of substance currently between the EU and the USA. Both are dependent upon the other's economic market and disputes affect only 2% of trade. See below for details of trade flows.[5]: The Delegation of the European Union to the United States is located in Washington, D.C. the United States.; The United States Mission to the European Union is located in Brussels, Belgium.
Uruguay	2018	Main article: Uruguay–European Union relations

=== Asia-Pacific ===
Country	Formal relations began	Notes
ASEAN (organisation)		Main article: ASEAN–European Union relations There are annual meetings between the EU and the ASEAN Plus Three. EU-ASEAN relations cover a broad range of topics, including peace and security; economic cooperation and trade; connectivity and the digital transition; sustainable development, climate change and energy; disaster preparedness; decent work; and health. At the 2022 EU-ASEAN Commemorative Summit, the EU and ASEAN signed a 2023–2027 Plan of Action, outlining the details of how this cooperation would be operationalised. Relations have sometimes been strained due to the membership of Myanmar in ASEAN. Notably, in 2006 the European Union threatened to boycott an EU-ASEAN meeting when Myanmar was due to take over the presidency of ASEAN in 2006, however Myanmar eventually gave up the presidency. However, in recent years this has been solved by having Myanmar participate in summits only at a technical level.
Australia		Main article: Australia–European Union relations Australia and the European Union (EU) have strong historical and cultural ties. The two have solid relations and often see eye-to-eye on international issues. The EU-Australian relations are founded on a Partnership Framework, first agreed in 2008. It covers not just economic relations, but broader political issues and cooperation. The EU is Australia's second largest trading partner, after China, and Australia is the EU's 17th. Australia's exports is dominated by mineral and agricultural goods. However 37% of trade is in commercial services, especially transportation and travel. EU corporations have a strong presence in Australia (approximately 2360) with an estimated turnover of €200 bn (just over 14% of total sales in Australia). These companies directly created 500,000 jobs in Australia. The EU is Australia's second largest destination of overseas investment and the EU is by far Australia's largest source of foreign investment €2.8 billion in 2009 (€11.6 billion in 2008). Trade was growing but ebbed in 2009 due to the 2008 financial crisis. A Free Trade Agreement between Australia and the EU is currently under negotiation, although stalled since 2021.
Bangladesh		Main article: Bangladesh–European Union relations
China		Main article: China–European Union relations The EU is China's largest trading partner, and China is the EU's second largest trading partner. Most of this trade is in industrial and manufactured goods. Between 2009 and 2010 alone EU exports to China increased by 38% and China's exports to the EU increased by 31%. However, there are sources of tension, such as human rights and the EU's arms embargo on China. Both the United States and the European Union as of 2005 have an arms embargo against the PRC, put in place in 1989 after the events of Tiananmen Square. The US and some EU members continue to support the ban but others, spearheaded by France, have been attempting to persuade the EU to lift the ban, arguing that more effective measures can be imposed, but also to improve trade relations between the PRC and certain EU states. The US strongly opposes this, and after the PRC passed an anti-secession law against Taiwan the likelihood of the ban being lifted diminished somewhat. There have been some disputes, such as the dispute over textile imports into the EU (see below). China and the EU are increasingly seeking cooperation, for example China joined the Galileo project investing €230 million and has been buying Airbus planes in return for a construction plant to be built in China; in 2006 China placed an order for 150 planes during a visit by the French President. Also, despite the arms embargo, a leaked US diplomatic cable suggested that in 2003 the EU sold China €400 million of "defence exports" and later, other military grade submarine and radar technology. Interest in closer relations started to rise as economic contacts increased and interest in a multipolar system grew. Although initially imposing an arms embargo on China after Tiananmen (see arms embargo section below), European leaders eased off China's isolation. China's growing economy became the focus for many European visitors and in turn Chinese businessmen began to make frequent trips to Europe. Europe's interest in China led to the EU becoming unusually active with China during the 1990s with high-level exchanges. EU-Chinese trade increased faster than the Chinese economy itself, tripling in ten years from US$14.3 billion in 1985 to US$45.6 billion in 1994. However political and security co-operation was hampered with China seeing little chance of headway there. Europe was leading the desire for NATO expansion and intervention in Kosovo, which China opposed as it saw them as extending US influence. However, by 2001 China moderated its anti-US stance in the hopes that Europe would cancel its arms embargo but pressure from the US led to the embargo remaining in place. Due to this, China saw the EU as being too weak, divided and dependent on the US to be a significant power. Furthermore, it shared too many of the US' concerns about China's authoritarian system and threats of force over Taiwan. Even in the economic sphere, China was angered at protectionist measures against its exports to Europe and the EU's opposition to giving China the status of market economy in order to join the WTO. However, economic cooperation continued, with the EU's "New Asia Strategy", the first Asia–Europe Meeting in 1996, the 1998 EU-China summit and frequent policy documents desiring closer partnerships with China. Although the 1997 Asian financial crisis dampened investors enthusiasm, China weathered the crisis well and continued to be a major focus of EU trade. Trade in 1993 saw a 63% increase from the previous year. China became Europe's fourth largest trading partner at this time. Even following the financial crisis in 1997, EU-Chinese trade increased by 15% in 1998.
Hong Kong		The EU and Hong Kong share values of democracy, human rights and market economics. Hong Kong Economic and Trade Office, Brussels is the official representation of Hong Kong to the European Union.
India		Main article: India–European Union relations See also: Foreign relations of India § European Union
Indonesia		Main article: Indonesia–European Union relations
Japan		Main article: Japan–European Union relations The EU and Japan share values of democracy, human rights and market economics. Both are global actors and cooperate in international fora. They also cooperate in each other's regions: Japan contributes to the reconstruction of the western Balkans and the EU supports international efforts to maintain peace in Korea and the rest of Asia. The EU Japanese relationship is anchored on two documents: the Joint Declaration of 1991 and the Action Plan for EU-Japan Cooperation of 2001. There are also a range of fora between the two, including an annual summit of leaders and an inter-parliamentary body. Both sides have now agreed to work towards a deep and comprehensive free trade agreement. Four agreements thus far have been signed by the two sides; The EU-Japan Mutual Recognition Agreement (entered force on 1 January 2002); An Agreement on Co-operation on Anti-competitive Activities (adopted 16 June 2003); A Science and Technology Agreement between the EU and Japan (signed 30 November 2009); The Agreement on Co-operation and Mutual Administrative Assistance (entered force on 1 February 2008); Japan is the EU's 6th largest export market (3.2% in 2010 with a value of €44 billion). EU exports are primarily in machinery and transport equipment (31.3%), chemical products (14.1%) and agricultural products (11.0%). Despite a global growth in EU exports, since 2006 EU exports to Japan have been declining slightly. In 2009, due to the 2008 financial crisis, exports saw a 14.7% drop; however in 2010 they recovered again by 21.3%. Japan is also the 6th largest source of imports to the EU (4.3% in 2010 with a value of €65 billion). Japanese exports to Europe are primarily machinery and transport equipment (66.7%). The EU is Japan's 3rd largest trading partner (11.1% of imports, 13.3% exports). Trade in commercial services were €17.2 billion from the EU to Japan and €12.7 billion from Japan to the EU. The trade relationship between the two has been characterised by strong trade surpluses for Japan, though that has moderated in the 2000s. Doing business and investing in Japan can be difficult for European countries and there have been some trade disputes between the two parties. However the slowdown in the Japanese economy encouraged it to open up more to EU business and investment. While working on reducing trade barriers, the main focus is on opening up investment flows.
Malaysia		Main article: Malaysia–European Union relations The relations started with the 1980 European Commission–ASEAN Agreement and were developed since the formation of European Economic Community (EEC) in 1957. In 2011, Malaysia is the European Union's second largest trading partner in Southeast Asia after Singapore and the 23rd largest trading partner for the European Union in the world, while the European Union is Malaysia's 4th largest trading partner.
Nepal		Main article: Nepal–European Union relations
New Zealand		Main article: New Zealand–European Union relations New Zealand and the European Union (EU) have strong historical and cultural ties. The two have solid relations and often see eye-to-eye on international issues. The EU-New Zealand relations are founded on a Joint Declaration on Relations and Cooperation, first agreed in 2007. It covers not just economic relations, but broader political issues and cooperation. The EU is New Zealand's second largest trading partner, after Australia, and New Zealand is the EU's 49th. New Zealand's exports is dominated by agricultural goods. The stock of EU foreign direct investment in New Zealand is €9.8bn and the stock of New Zealand's investment in the EU is €4.5bn. A Free Trade Agreement between the EU and New Zealand was signed in early 2023 and has been in force since May 2024.
North Korea		Main article: North Korea–European Union relations
Pakistan		Main article: Pakistan–European Union relations The EU accounts for 20% of Pakistani external trade with Pakistani exports to the EU amounting to €3.4 billion, mainly textiles and leather products) and EU exports to Pakistan amounting to €3.8 billion (mainly mechanical and electrical equipment, and chemical and pharmaceutical products.
Philippines		Main article: Philippines–European Union relations The European Union and the Philippines shares diplomatic, economic, cultural and political relations. The European Union has provided €3 million to the Philippines to fight poverty and €6 million for counter-terrorism against terrorist groups in the Southern Philippines. The European Union is also the third largest trading partner of the Philippines with the Philippines and The European Union importing and exporting products to each other. There are at least (estimated) 31,961 Europeans (not including Spaniards) living in the Philippines.
South Korea		Main article: South Korea–European Union relations The Republic of Korea (South Korea) and the European Union (EU) are important trade partners: Korea is the EU's 9th largest trading partner and the EU is Korea's second largest export market. The two have signed a free trade agreement which will be provisionally applied by the end of 2011. See also: European Union–South Korea Free Trade Agreement The first EU – South Korea agreement was Agreement on Co-operation and Mutual Administrative Assistance in Customs Matters (signed on 13 May 1997). This agreement allows the sharing of competition policy between the two parties. The second agreement, the Framework Agreement on Trade and Co-operation (enacted on 1 April 2001). The framework attempts to increase co-operation on several industries, including transport, energy, science and technology, industry, environment and culture. In 2010, the EU and Korea signed a new framework agreement and a free trade agreement (FTA) which is the EU's first FTA with an Asian country and removes virtually all tariffs and many non-tariff barriers. On the basis of this, the EU and Korea decided in October 2010 to upgrade their relationship to a Strategic Partnership. These agreements will be provisionally in force by the end of 2011. EU-Korea summits have taken place in 2002 (Copenhagen), 2004 (Hanoi) and 2006 (Helsinki) on the sidelines of ASEM meetings. In 2009, the first stand alone bilateral meeting was held in Seoul. The European Parliament delegation for relations with Korea visits the country twice a year for discussions with their Korean counterparts. Meetings at foreign minister level take place at least once a year on the sidelines of ASEAN regional form meetings, however meetings between the Korean foreign minister and the EU High Representative have occurred more frequently, for example at G20 meetings. At hoc meetings between officials occur nearly monthly. Further Information: Foreign relations of South Korea#Europe.
Taiwan	Informal relations	Main article: Taiwan–European Union relations
Vietnam	1996	Main article: Vietnam–European Union relations

=== Europe and Central Asia ===
The European Union's European Neighbourhood Policy (ENP) aims at bringing Europe and its neighbours closer.

EU enlargement and foreign relations

The European Economic Community established relations with the Soviet Union through the conclusion of the EEC-Euratom-Soviet Union Agreement on trade and commercial and economic cooperation in 1989. As of 2025, the Agreement is in force between the European Union and the Republic of Belarus and between the European Union and Turkmenistan. Previously, the Agreement applied to relations with other successor states of the Soviet Union, but has been replaced by separate bilateral agreements with each post-Soviet country.

The EU does not officially recognize the Eurasian Economic Union due to its disagreements with Russia, the EAEU's largest member state. The European Commission website states in 2025 that "the Commission maintained a technical dialogue with the executive branch of the Eurasian Economic Union (EAEU) – the Eurasian Economic Commission – until Russia's invasion of Ukraine in February 2022". At least in 2012 and 2015, members of the European Parliament met with members of the Eurasian Economic Commission. In 2012, a delegation from the European Parliament's Committee on International Trade, led by Committee Chair Mr. Vital Moreira, discussed opportunities for cooperation between the countries of the EurAsEC Customs Union and the European Union. In 2015, the European Parliament's United European Left–Nordic Green Left group, led by its chair Gabriele Zimmer, met with the Eurasian Economic Commission, received information about the work of the Eurasian Economic Union and expressed interest in developing further dialogue with the Eurasian Economic Commission.

The EU regularly holds High-level Political and Security Dialogues (HLDs) with the countries of Central Asia which include Kazakhstan, the Kyrgyz Republic, Tajikistan, Turkmenistan and Uzbekistan, with Afghanistan often invited as a guest. The HLDs with these states have a focus on security, and provide a formal platform to exchange views and ideas, advance collaboration and support EU involvement in the Central Asian region.

An update to the 10-year-old EU-Central Asia strategy is expected to be developed by the end of 2019. The new EU Central Asia Strategy was introduced at the EU-Central Asia Ministerial meeting in Bishkek, Kyrgyz Republic, on 7 July 2019. Federica Mogherini also presented a set of EU funded regional programmes totaling €72 million. The new programmes cover the following sectors: sustainable energy, economic empowerment, education, and inclusive sustainable growth.

During the COVID-19 pandemic, the EU allocated more than €134 million to Central Asia as part of its "Team Europe" solidarity package. The funds were granted to strengthen the health, water and sanitation systems and address the socio-economic repercussions of the crisis.

The first-ever "EU-Central Asia Economic Forum" is set to take place in 2021. The Forum will focus on innovative and sustainable approach to economic and business development, as well as green economy.

The first Central Asia-EU high-level meeting took place in Astana on 27 October 2022. The participants (representatives from Kazakhstan, Kyrgyzstan, Tajikistan, Uzbekistan, Turkmenistan, and the EU) issued a joint communique, embracing the steps towards the institutionalisation of the relationship between the Central Asian nations and the EU.

==== Programmes in Central Asia ====
===== Border Management Programme in Central Asia =====
The EU launched in 2002 the BOMCA to mitigate the impacts of human trafficking, trafficking of drugs, organised crime and terrorism on EU interests and regional partners.

===== Central Asia Drug Action Programme =====
The CADAP works to bolster drug policies of Central Asian states by providing assistance policy makers, industry experts, law enforcement, educators and medical staff, victims of drug abuse, the media and the general public.

Country	Formal relations began	Notes
Albania		Main article: Accession of Albania to the European Union Albania is an EU candidate since June 2014, and has applied for membership since 2009. Majority of Albanian policy especially foreign is in line with EU, relations have been very strong and warm.
Andorra		Main article: Andorra–European Union relations Andorra co-operates with the EU, and uses the euro but is not seeking membership.
Armenia	1991	Main articles: Armenia–European Union relations and Accession of Armenia to the European Union In 1991, the country became one of the successors to the Soviet Union in terms of international treaties and international relations. Relations between the Soviet Union and the European Communities were established in 1990. The Partnership and Cooperation Agreement (PCA) (signed in 1996 and in force since 1999) served as the legal framework for EU-Armenia bilateral relations. Since 2004, Armenia and the other South Caucasus states have been part of the European Neighbourhood Policy, encouraging closer ties with the EU. Armenia and the EU were set to sign a free trade and Association Agreement in September 2013, however the agreement was called off by Armenia, prior to Armenia joining the Eurasian Economic Union in 2014. Though, a revised Comprehensive and Enhanced Partnership Agreement (CEPA) was later finalized between Armenia and the EU in November 2017. Armenia also participates in the Eastern Partnership Program and the Euronest Parliamentary Assembly; which aims at forging closer political and economic integration with the EU. In April 2018, Armenia began implementing actions for launching visa liberalization dialogue for Armenian citizens travelling into the Schengen area. The Mission of Armenia to the European Union is located in Brussels and the Delegation of the European Union to Armenia is located in Yerevan. On 12 February 2025, Armenia's parliament approved a bill officially endorsing Armenia's EU accession. The EU fully supports the peace process between Armenia and Azerbaijan and the normalization process between Armenia and Turkey.
Azerbaijan	1991	Main article: Azerbaijan–European Union relations In 1991, the country became one of the successors to the Soviet Union in terms of international treaties and international relations. Relations between the Soviet Union and the European Communities were established in 1990.
Belarus	1991	Main article: Belarus–European Union relations In 1991, the country became one of the successors to the Soviet Union in terms of international treaties and international relations. Relations between the Soviet Union and the European Communities were established in 1990. As of 2025, the EEC-Euratom-Soviet Union Agreement on trade and commercial and economic cooperation concluded in 1989 is in force between the European Union and the Republic of Belarus. Belarus has strained relations with the EU as it is the only dictatorship left on the EU's borders.
Bosnia and Herzegovina		Main article: Accession of Bosnia and Herzegovina to the European Union Bosnia and Herzegovina is an EU candidate that has completed an association agreement. It made a formal application on 15 February 2016 and was accepted as a candidate on 15 December 2022, however it is experiencing problems integrating its component states. It is still under partial control of the international community via the EU-appointed High Representative for Bosnia and Herzegovina.
Faroe Islands		Main article: Faroe Islands and the European Union
Georgia	1991	Main articles: Georgia–European Union relations and Accession of Georgia to the European Union In 1991, the country became one of the successors to the Soviet Union in terms of international treaties and international relations. Relations between the Soviet Union and the European Communities were established in 1990.
Iceland		Main article: Iceland–European Union relations Iceland is part of the EU market via the European Economic Area and the Schengen Area. Although previously opposed to the idea of membership, it made an application in 2009 due to its economic collapse. From 2010 to 2013 Iceland was working on its accession, when it froze the process.
Kazakhstan	1991	Main article: Kazakhstan–European Union relations In 1991, the country became one of the successors to the Soviet Union in terms of international treaties and international relations. Relations between the Soviet Union and the European Communities were established in 1990. The European Union has an Enhanced Strategic Partnership and Cooperation Agreement with Kazakhstan, its first with a Central Asian country. The EU is also the largest foreign investor in Kazakhstan. The EU-Kazakhstan Cooperation Council is a ministerial-level meeting.
Kyrgyzstan	1991	In 1991, the country became one of the successors to the Soviet Union in terms of international treaties and international relations. Relations between the Soviet Union and the European Communities were established in 1990.
Liechtenstein		Main article: Liechtenstein–European Union relations Liechtenstein is part of the EU market via the European Economic Area and the Schengen Area.
Moldova	1991	Main articles: Moldova–European Union relations and Accession of Moldova to the European Union In 1991, the country became one of the successors to the Soviet Union in terms of international treaties and international relations. Relations between the Soviet Union and the European Communities were established in 1990.
Monaco		Main article: Monaco–European Union relations Monaco co-operates with the EU in aspects such as the Schengen Area and uses the euro.
Montenegro	2006	Main article: Accession of Montenegro to the European Union Montenegro is an official candidate for the EU, and has applied for EU membership on 15 December 2008. Accession negotiations started on 29 June 2012.
North Macedonia		Main article: Accession of North Macedonia to the European Union
Norway		Main article: Norway–European Union relations Norway is part of the EU market via the European Economic Area and the Schengen Area.
Russia	1990/1991	Main article: Russia–European Union relations In 1991, the country became one of the successors to the Soviet Union in terms of international treaties and international relations. Relations between the Soviet Union and the European Communities were established in 1990.
San Marino		Main article: San Marino–European Union relations San Marino co-operates with the EU in aspects such as the Schengen Area and uses the euro.
Serbia		Main article: Accession of Serbia to the European Union Serbia is an official candidate for the EU, and has applied for EU membership on 22 December 2009. Accession negotiations started on 21 January 2014.
Sovereign Military Order of Malta		Main article: Sovereign Military Order of Malta–European Union relations Ambassador-level relations.
Switzerland		Main article: Switzerland–European Union relations Switzerland does not participate in the EEA, but does co-operate through bilateral treaties similar to the EEA and is part of the Schengen Area.
Turkey		Main article: Turkey–European Union relations Turkey is an official candidate for the EU, and has applied for EU membership on 14 April 1987. Accession negotiations started on 3 October 2005. Full membership negotiations between the EU and Turkey have been effectively suspended since 2019. On 18 July 2023, the EU decided not to restart full membership negotiations with Turkey.: The Delegation of the European Union to Turkey is located in Ankara, Turkey.; The Mission of Turkey to the European Union is located in Brussels, Belgium.
Turkmenistan	1991	In 1991, the country became one of the successors to the Soviet Union in terms of international treaties and international relations. Relations between the Soviet Union and the European Communities were established in 1990. As of 2025, the EEC-Euratom-Soviet Union Agreement on trade and commercial and economic cooperation concluded in 1989 is in force between the European Union and Turkmenistan.
Ukraine	1991	Main articles: Ukraine–European Union relations and Accession of Ukraine to the European Union In 1991, the country became one of the successors to the Soviet Union in terms of international treaties and international relations. Relations between the Soviet Union and the European Communities were established in 1990.: The Delegation of the European Union to Ukraine is located in Kyiv, Ukraine.; The Mission of Ukraine to the European Union is located in Brussels, Belgium.
United Kingdom	2018	Main article: United Kingdom–European Union relations: The Delegation of the European Union to the United Kingdom is located in London, the United Kingdom.; The Mission of the United Kingdom to the European Union is located in Brussels, Belgium.
Vatican City (Holy See)		Main article: Holy See–European Union relations The Vatican, as a unique state, does not participate in most EU projects but does use the euro.

==== Partly recognised states ====
Country	Formal relations began	Notes
Kosovo	Limited recognition from 2008	Main article: Accession of Kosovo to the European Union Kosovo is not recognised by all EU members and therefore cannot have official contractual relations with EU. Yet it still maintains relations with the EU and has been recognised by the EU as a country with a European perspective.
Northern Cyprus	None	Main article: Northern Cyprus–European Union relations Northern Cyprus is not recognised by the EU and is a serious dispute for Cyprus and Turkish membership. The EU is committed to Cypriot reunification.

== Scientific cooperation ==
The European Union has frameworks for bilateral cooperation and specific projects in science and technology, with countries and regional blocs situated beyond the European Union.

=== Types of association ===
Since 1994, the European Union (EU) has signed international agreements for scientific and technological cooperation with many non-EU countries, such as Algeria, Argentina, Australia, Brazil, Canada, Chile, the People’s Republic of China, Egypt, India, Israel, Japan, Jordan, Kazakhstan, Rep. Korea, Mexico, Morocco, New Zealand, Russia, Saudi Arabia, South Africa, Tunisia, Turkey, Ukraine, the United Kingdom and the United States. For the European Parliament, ‘the science diplomacy aspect of this cooperation is emphasized at EU level to facilitate interactions with third countries, as well as to increase the EU's soft power’.

The EU invites countries beyond the bloc to participate in its seven-year framework programmes for research and innovation, including developing countries. Horizon Europe, the European Union's framework program for scientific research and innovation between 2021 and 2027, is the bloc's biggest research programme ever, with a budget of €95.5 billion. Horizon Europe aims to raise EU science spending levels by 50% during that period. It supports European partnerships in which the EU, national authorities and/or the private sector jointly commit to support the development and implementation of a programme of research and innovation activities. Horizon Europe expanded its partnerships beyond the 27 member states to include a number of European countries that are not EU member states as well as Israel.

Some countries are associated with the EU's framework programmes for research and innovation through a formal agreement. For Horizon 2020, this includes Iceland, Norway and Switzerland, Israel and countries at various stages of negotiations regarding their future accession to the EU, as in the case of several Southeast European countries (Albania, Bosnia and Herzegovina, Former Yugoslav Republic of Macedonia, Montenegro and Serbia) and both Moldova and Turkey. As part of its association agreement concluded with the EU in 2014, Ukraine has also formally become a Horizon 2020 partner.

A wider list of countries, including numerous developing ones, are in principle automatically eligible to submit research proposals through Horizon 2020 programmes. Association with the EU's framework programs can represent a significant contribution to the partner country's research volume and help it develop linkages with international networks of excellence. In turn, the EU has derived substantial benefit from the scientific talent of countries from the former Soviet bloc and elsewhere (e.g. Israel) through its framework programs.

=== European Free Trade Association ===
The European Free Trade Association is an inter-governmental organization devoted to promoting free trade and economic integration in Europe. Its headquarters are in Geneva (Switzerland), but another office in Brussels (Belgium) liaises with the European Commission. Twelve years after EFTA was founded in 1960, it counted nine member states: Austria, Denmark, Finland, Iceland, Norway, Portugal, Sweden, Switzerland and the United Kingdom. All but three had joined the EU by 1995: Iceland, Norway and Switzerland. Liechtenstein's adhesion since 1991 brings EFTA's current membership to four.

A turning point in EFTA's development came with the signing of an agreement with the EU on the creation of a single European market. The Agreement on the European Economic Area (EEA) was signed by Iceland, Liechtenstein and Norway and entered into force in 1994. It provides the legal framework for the implementation of the four cornerstones of the single market: the free movement of people, goods, services and capital. The agreement established common rules for competition and state aid and promoted cooperation in key policy areas, including research and development (R&D). It is through this agreement that three of the four EFTA members (all but Switzerland) participate in the EU's main research activities as associated states on the same footing as the EU member states. Switzerland, on the other hand, must negotiate a bilateral cooperation agreement with the EU for each framework programme, as well as in areas such as trade in goods and services, and adhere to the four cornerstones of the single market. The four EFTA members thus do not have a unified legal and political status vis-à-vis the EU, which is why some refer to the ‘Norwegian Model’ and ‘Swiss Model’.

All four countries are involved in most of the European Commission's activities, as well as some other pan-European initiatives such as European Co-operation in Science and Technology (COST) and Eureka, a co-operative scheme providing companies, universities and research institutes with incentives for cross-border market-driven research. They also take part in the Bologna Process, the collective effort of European countries to harmonize and co-ordinate higher education.

==== Iceland, Liechtenstein and Norway ====
The European Economic Area (EEA) agreement affords Iceland, Liechtenstein and Norway the status of fully associated partners in EU research programmes. Iceland and Norway take full advantage of this opportunity; they were among the most successful countries per capita for the obtention of competitive research grants from the Seventh Framework Programme over 2007–2013. For its part, Iceland had the best success rate of all European Research Area countries in the Cooperation programme of the seventh framework programme, which set out to strengthen research cooperation between universities, industry, research centres and public authorities across the EU and the rest of the world.

Participation in EU activities is not free. Besides paying a lump sum to each framework programme, the three EEA countries contribute to reducing socio-economic disparities in Europe by promoting social cohesion, via a special programme administered autonomously by the EEA Secretariat: the EEA/Norway grants programme. Although this is not really a research programme, education, science and technology play a crucial role in the areas covered by the programme, from environmental protection, renewable energy and the development of green industries to human development, better working conditions and the protection of cultural heritage.

Between 2008 and 2014, the three EEA donors invested €1.8 billion in 150 programmes that had been defined jointly with 16 beneficiary countries in central and southern Europe. In relation to climate change, for instance, one of the programme's priority themes, a joint project enabled Portugal to draw on the Icelandic experience to tap its geothermal potential in the Azores. Portugal has also co-operated with the Norwegian Institute for Marine Research to keep its seas healthy. Through another project, Innovation Norway and the Norwegian Water Resource and Energy Administration have helped Bulgaria to improve its energy efficiency and innovate in green industries.

The EEA grants/Norway grants programme will continue in the years to come, albeit with small changes to the programme structure, a likely increase in spending levels and a merger of the two types of grant into a single funding scheme. As in the past, Iceland and Norway are participating as fully associated members in Horizon 2020. Liechtenstein, on the other hand, has decided to refrain from an association with Horizon 2020, in light of the small number of scientists from this country and its resultant low participation level in the two former programmes.

==== Switzerland ====
Switzerland was unable to sign the European Economic Area treaty, even though it had participated actively in drawing it up, owing to a negative vote in a Swiss referendum in November 1992. A bilateral agreement with the EU nevertheless allows Switzerland to take advantage of the main EU instruments in place, including the seven-year framework programmes for research and innovation, the Future and Emerging Technologies programme, the grants of the European Research Council and the Erasmus programme for student exchange, in return for adhering to the 'four freedoms' of the single market, the freedom of movement of goods, services, people and capital. Switzerland's political ties to the EU are therefore more tenuous than those of the three other EFTA members.

Switzerland is the most successful country per capita in the calls for research proposals issued by the European Research Council. Moreover, one of its universities, the Ecole polytechnique fédérale de Lausanne, is leading the Human Brain Project, one of the two flagship projects of the Future and Emerging Technologies Programme, the other being the Graphene Project.

After the anti-immigration vote in a popular referendum in 2014, which flew in the face of one of the EU's four freedoms, the free movement of people (the others being the free circulation of goods, services and capital), there was some doubt as to whether Switzerland would continue to participate in Horizon 2020 after 2016. Shortly after the vote, the Swiss government had informed the EU that it would be unable to give Croatian citizens unrestricted access to the Swiss job market, as this would be incompatible with the ‘yes’ vote in the referendum. The European Commission reacted by excluding Switzerland from research programmes potentially worth hundreds of millions of euros for its universities and suspended negotiations on Switzerland's participation as a full member of Horizon 2020. The European Commission also suspended Switzerland from the Erasmus student exchange programme. According to the ATS news agency, some 2 600 Swiss students took advantage of Erasmus in 2011 and Switzerland played host that same year to about 2 900 foreign students within the same EU-funded programme. The crisis was resolved after the Swiss parliament adopted a bill in December 2016 that gave priority to Swiss nationals and foreigners registered at Swiss job agencies but stopped short of introducing quotas on EU citizens.

=== Southeast Europe ===
In July 2014, the remaining five non-EU countries in Southeast Europe (Albania, Bosnia and Herzegovina, Former Yugoslav Republic of Macedonia, Montenegro and Serbia), announced their decision to join the EU's Horizon 2020 programme, which succeeds the EU's Seventh Framework Programme for Research and Technological Development (2007–2013), in which they also participated. The relevant association agreements, which apply retroactively from 1 January 2014, allow entities from these five countries to compete for research funding under the Horizon 2020 programme.

Meanwhile, all are participating in a number of multilateral frameworks, including the European Cooperation in Science and Technology (COST) programme, which fosters co-operative networking by funding researchers’ participation in conferences, short-term scientific exchanges and the like. Another example is Eureka, a pan-European intergovernmental organization which fosters market-driven industrial R&D through a bottom-up approach that allows industry to decide which projects it wishes to develop.

=== Russian Federation ===
Russian research centres and universities are participating in Horizon 2020 within international consortia, following fairly active participation in previous framework programmes. This co-operation is co-ordinated by a joint committee. In parallel, joint working groups have been set up to manage field-specific joint research calls that are cofinanced by the allied EU and Russian programmes.

A roadmap for establishing the EU–Russia Common Space for Research and Education is also currently being implemented, involving, inter alia, the stepping up of collaboration in space research and technologies. The Agreement for Co-operation between the European Atomic Energy Community and the Russian government in the field of controlled nuclear safety (2001) is currently in force. A joint declaration on the Partnership for Modernization was signed at the Russian Federation–EU summit in 2010.

The Russian Federation participates in a number of European research centres, including the European Organization for Nuclear Research (CERN) in Switzerland, the European Synchrotron Radiation Facility in France and European X-ray Free Electron Laser in Germany. It is a major stakeholder in several international megascience projects, including the ongoing construction of both the International Thermonuclear Experimental Reactor in France and the Facility for Antiproton and Ion Research in Germany. The Russian Federation also hosts the Joint Institute for Nuclear Research in Dubna, which employs over 1 000 researchers from the Russian Federation and further afield and receives nearly the same number of temporary foreign visitors each year.

In 2014, a wide array of activities were set in motion as part of the Russian–EU Year of Science. These include the launch of joint projects such as Interact (Arctic research), Supra (next-generation pilot simulators), Diabimmune (diabetic and auto-immune illness prophylactics) and Hopsa/Apos (efficient supercomputing for science and industry).

Even at the height of tensions over Ukraine, in 2014, the Agreement on Co-operation in Science and Technology was renewed for another five years by the European Commission and the Russian government. However, economic sanctions imposed on the Russian Federation by the EU in 2014 are limiting co-operation in certain areas, such as dual-use military technologies, energy-related equipment and technologies, services related to deep-water exploration and Arctic or shale oil exploration. The sanctions may ultimately affect broader scientific co-operation.

=== Black Sea basin ===
One of the strategic goals of the Organization of the Black Sea Economic Cooperation (BSEC) is to deepen ties with the European Commission in Brussels. BSEC was founded in 1992, shortly after the disintegration of the Union of Soviet Socialist Republics, in order to develop prosperity and security in the region. It comprises 12 members: Albania, Armenia, Azerbaijan, Bulgaria, Georgia, Greece, Moldova, Romania, the Russian Federation, Serbia, Turkey and Ukraine.

The Council of Ministers of Foreign Affairs is the BSEC's central decision-making body. There is also a Parliamentary Assembly modelled on the Council of Europe and a Permanent International Secretariat, based in Istanbul. BSEC has a Business Council made up of experts and representatives of Chambers of Commerce from the member states and a Black Sea Trade and Development Bank which receives support from the European Investment Bank and the European Bank for Reconstruction and Development.

BSEC has adopted three Action Plans on Cooperation in Science and Technology (2005-2009, 2010-2014 and 2014–2018). The second Action Plan was funded on a project basis, since the plan had no dedicated budget. Two key projects funded by the European Union got underway in 2008 and 2009, namely the Scientific and Technological International Cooperation Network for Eastern European and Central Asian Countries (IncoNet EECA) and the Networking on Science and Technology in the Black Sea Region project (BS-ERA-Net). BSEC's second action plan targeted the development of physical and virtual multinational infrastructure by pooling the resources of BSEC member states, the networking of research institutes and universities in BSEC countries and their connection to the European gigabit.

BSEC's Third Action Plan on Science and Technology 2014-2018 acknowledges that considerable effort has been devoted to setting up a Black Sea Research Programme involving both BSEC and European Union members but also that, ‘in a period of scarce public funding, the research projects the Project Development Fund could support will decrease and, as a result, its impact will be limited. Additional efforts are needed to find a solution for the replenishment of the Project Development Fund’.

Having signed an association agreement with the EU as long ago as 1964, Turkey has been an Associated Country of the European Research Area and the EU's framework programmes for research and innovation for many years. It is also a member of COST and participates in Eureka.

Ukraine and the EU signed an agreement in 2010 which determined key thematic areas for co-operation: environmental and climate research, including observation of the Earth's surface; biomedical research; agriculture, forestry and fisheries; industrial technologies; materials science and metrology; non-nuclear power engineering; transport; information society technologies; social research; science and technology policy studies and training and the exchange of specialists. In March 2015, Ukraine signed an agreement with the EU for associate membership of Horizon 2020 with significantly more advantageous conditions on the table than previously, notably the possibility for Ukraine to participate in scientific co-operation at a fraction of the original cost.

The EU's association agreements signed with Georgia, Moldova and Ukraine in mid-2014 envisage enhancing these countries’ participation in Horizon 2020. Moldova had already signed an association agreement in 2012 for the previous framework programme.

=== Israel ===
Israel has been associated with the EU's framework programmes on research and innovation since 1996. Between 2007 and 2013, Israeli public and private institutions contributed their scientific expertise to over 1 500 projects. Israel also participates in other EU programmes, such as those of the European Research Council or European Molecular Biology Laboratory.

Israel has been a Scientific Associate of the European Synchrotron Radiation Facility since 1999; the agreement was renewed in 2013 for a fourth term of five years and notably raised Israel's contribution from 0.5% to 1.5% of ESRF's budget.

Israel is also one of the ten founding members of the European Molecular Biology Laboratory, which dates from 1974. In 2012, the Weizmann Institute of Science, together with Tel Aviv University, was chosen as one of the seven core centres of the new Integrated Structural Biology Infrastructure (Instruct), joining prestigious institutions in France and Germany, Italy and the UK.

Israel has been selected as one of the seven nodes of the European Strategy Forum of Research Infrastructure, which is establishing about 40 such nodes in total, seven of them in biomedical sciences. The aim of the biomedical Instruct is to provide pan-European users with access to state-of-the-art equipment, technologies and personnel in cellular structural biology, to enable Europe to maintain a competitive edge in this vital research area.

Israel is also one of the nodes of Elixir, which orchestrates the collection, quality control and archiving of large amounts of biological data produced by life science experiments in Europe. Some of these datasets are highly specialized and were previously only available to researchers within the country in which they were generated.

=== Central Asia ===
IncoNet CA was launched by the EU in September 2013 to encourage Central Asian countries to participate in research projects within Horizon 2020. The focus of the research projects is on three societal challenges considered as being of mutual interest to both the EU and Central Asia, namely: climate change, energy and health.

IncoNet CA builds on the experience of earlier EU projects which involved other regions, such as Eastern Europe, the South Caucasus and the Western Balkans. IncoNet CA focuses on twinning research facilities in Central Asia and Europe. It involves a consortium of partner institutions from Austria, the Czech Republic, Estonia, Germany, Hungary, Kazakhstan, Kyrgyzstan, Poland, Portugal, Tajikistan, Turkey and Uzbekistan. In May 2014, the EU launched a 24-month call for applications from twinned institutions – universities, companies and research institutes – for funding of up to €10 000 to enable them to visit one another's facilities to discuss project ideas or prepare joint events like workshops. The total budget within IncoNet CA amounts to €85 000.

The International Science and Technology Center (ISTC) was established in 1992 by the European Union (EU), Japan, the Russian Federation and the US to engage weapons scientists in civilian R&D projects and to foster technology transfer. ISTC branches have been set up in the following countries party to the agreement: Armenia, Belarus, Georgia, Kazakhstan, Kyrgyzstan and Tajikistan. The headquarters of ISTC were moved to Nazarbayev University in Kazakhstan in June 2014, three years after the Russian Federation announced its withdrawal from the centre.

=== Arab region ===
Lebanon participates in a platform linking Mediterranean observatories of science, technology and innovation. This co-operative platform was set up by the Mediterranean Science, Policy, Research and Innovation Gateway (Med-Spring project) within the EU's Seventh Framework Programme for Research and Innovation (2007–2013). Med-Spring focused on three societal challenges: energy; high-quality affordable food; and the scarcity of resources. It sought to achieve policy objectives through the creation of a platform fostering dialogue and coordination among governmental bodies, research institutions, non-governmental organisations and civil society. Med-Spring involved the following countries: Algeria, Belgium, Cyprus, Egypt, France, Germany, Greece, Italy, Israel, Jordan, Lebanon, Malta, Morocco, Palestine, Portugal, Spain, Tunisia and Turkey.

In September 2013, ministers of research met in Morocco to lay the foundations for a common research policy between the five countries of the Maghreb and five countries of the Western Mediterranean: France, Italy, Malta, Portugal and Spain. These ten countries have met regularly since 1990 to discuss a wide range of issues, from security and economic co-operation to defence, migration, education and renewable energy but this was the first time that the 5+5 Dialogue, as the forum is known, had met to discuss research and innovation. In the Rabat Declaration adopted at this meeting, ministers undertake to facilitate training, technology transfer and scientific mobility by creating a specific visa for researchers. In parallel, the Maghreb countries are encouraged to join European research programmes as a first step towards harmonizing national policies and launching joint research projects.

=== Sub-Saharan Africa ===
Initially framed within the Cotonou Agreement (2000) covering sub-Saharan, Caribbean and Pacific countries but excluding South Africa, the EU's co-operation with Africa is increasingly being organized in partnership with Africa's own frameworks for co-operation, in particular the African Union, as well as within the Joint Africa–EU Strategy adopted by African and European Heads of State at the Lisbon Summit in 2007. According to a progress report on implementation of this strategy, the EU's contribution of €14 million between 2007 and 2013 enabled the African Union Commission to design and launch two successive €7 million calls for proposals to support research in post-harvest agriculture, renewable and sustainable energy and water and sanitation. Twenty collaborative research projects were funded through this programme. The EU's Seventh Framework Programme for Research funded 565 collaborative research projects involving African participants. Altogether, some 1315 participants from 45 African countries had received a total of €178 million through the Seventh Framework Programme as of September 2013. Over the same period, the European Research Council allocated five grants to African researchers.

The ERAfrica initiative (2010–2014) funded by the Seventh Framework Programme has enabled European and African countries to launch joint calls for proposals in three thematic fields: Renewable Energy; Interfacing Challenges; and New Ideas; this has resulted in 17 collaborative research projects being backed by €8.3 million. Meanwhile, the Network for the Coordination and Advancement of sub-Saharan Africa–EU Science and Technology Cooperation Plus (CAAST-Net Plus, 2013–2016) focuses on food security, climate change and health, with the participation of 26 research organizations across both continents.

South Africa is the only African country which participates in the EU's Erawatch programme. One out of four of South Africa's almost 1 000 applications to the Seventh Framework Programme for research project funding was successful, representing a total of more than €735 million, according to the 2012 Erawatch report on South Africa.

African countries are expected to participate in Horizon 2020 through similar arrangements to those for the Seventh Framework Programme. By mid-2015, institutions from 16 African countries had reportedly obtained €5 million from Horizon 2020 in the form of 37 individual grants, the majority of which are related to climate change and health research. However, as of late 2015, African involvement in Horizon 2020 was lower than for the Seventh Framework Programme. According to the EU, this primarily reflects the need to set up national contact points in more African countries and to increase their capacity through supportive EU projects.

=== China ===
China has enjoyed extensive co-operation with the EU ever since the signing of the EU–China Science and Technology Agreement in 1999. Relations have deepened, in particular, since the creation of the EU–China Comprehensive Strategic Partnership in 2003. During the Seventh Framework Programme, China was the EU's third-largest partner country (after the US and the Russian Federation) for the number of participating organizations (383) and collaborative research projects (274), particularly those focusing on health, environment, transportation, ICTs and the bio-economy.

Co-operation with China is significant for qualitative reasons, as many projects focus on frontier technologies, such as clean and efficient carbon capture. In addition to facilitating a convergence of views between researchers of different backgrounds, this co-operation has had some positive spillovers to other regions in complex cross-disciplinary areas, one example being the project for Advancing Universal Health Coverage in Asia over 2009–2013). The EU and China are also co-operating within Euratom via its fission programme and construction of the International Thermonuclear Experimental Reactor in France to further research into nuclear fusion. Between 2007 and 2013, nearly 4 000 Chinese researchers received funding through the Marie Curie Actions.

The EU intends for China to remain an important partner of Horizon 2020, even though China is no longer eligible for funding from the European Commission, meaning that EU and Chinese participants will be expected to secure funding themselves for their joint project proposals. The initial work programme (2014–2015) under Horizon 2020 will most likely focus on food, agriculture and biotechnology; water; energy; ICTs; nanotechnology; space; and polar research. China's co-operation with the Euratom Work Programme on topics related to fusion and fission is also expected to continue.

=== Southeast Asia ===
The annual ASEAN–European Union Science, Technology and Innovation Days are reinforcing dialogue and co-operation between these two regional bodies. This annual forum was launched in 2014 within the Southeast Asia–EU Network for Biregional Co-operation project (SEA–EU NET II) funded by the EU's Seventh Framework Programme for Research and Innovation. A network designed to foster policy dialogue between the EU and the Pacific region has been launched within the same framework programme.

The second of these days took place in France in March 2015 and the third in Viet Nam in 2016. In 2015, the theme was Excellent Science in ASEAN. Some 24 exhibitors presented research from their institution or enterprise. There were also sessions on scientific topics and two policy sessions, one on the evolution of the ASEAN Economic Community and the second on the importance of intellectual property rights for the Pacific region.

=== South Pacific ===
The Pacific–Europe Network for Science, Technology and Innovation (PACE-Net Plus) is funded by the European Commission within its Seventh Framework Programme for Research and Development (2007–2013). This project has spanned the period 2013–2016 and thus overlaps with the European Union's Horizon 2020 programme (2014–2020).

PACE–Net Plus sets out to reinforce the dialogue between the Pacific region and Europe, support biregional research and innovation through calls for research proposals and to promote scientific excellence and industrial and economic competition. Ten of its 16 members come from the Pacific region and the remainder from Europe.

The Pacific partners are the Australian National University, Montroix Pty Ltd (Australia), University of the South Pacific, Institut Malardé in French Caledonia, National Centre for Technological Research into Nickel and its Environment in New Caledonia, South Pacific Community, Landcare Research Ltd in New Zealand, University of Papua New Guinea, Samoa National University and the Vanuatu Cultural Centre.

The other six partners are: the Association of Commonwealth Universities, the Institut de recherche pour le développement in France, the Technical Centre for Agricultural and Rural Cooperation, a joint international institution of the African, Caribbean and Pacific Group of States and the European Union, the Sociedade Portuguesa de Inovação, United Nations Industrial Development Organization and Leibniz Centre for Tropical Marine Ecology in Germany.

PACE-Net Plus focuses on three societal challenges:

- health, demographic change and well-being;
- food security, sustainable agriculture, marine and maritime research and the bio-economy; and
- climate action, resource efficiency and raw materials.

A conference held in Suva (Fiji) in 2012 under the umbrella of PACE–Net Plus produced recommendations for a strategic plan for research, innovation and development in the Pacific. The conference report published in 2013 identified research needs in the Pacific in seven areas: health; agriculture and forestry; fisheries and aquaculture; biodiversity and ecosystem management; freshwater; natural hazards; and energy.

The conference also established the Pacific Islands University Research Network to support knowledge creation and sharing and to prepare succinct recommendations for the development of a regional policy framework for science, technology and innovation. This formal research network complements the Fiji-based University of the South Pacific, which has campuses in other Pacific Island countries.

=== Latin America ===
Biregional scientific co-operation between the European Union and Latin America and the Caribbean dates back to the early 1980s, when the former Commission of the European Communities and the Andean Group Secretariat signed an agreement for co-operation and established a joint commission to oversee its implementation. Later, Europe concluded similar agreements with the Central American countries and Mercosur.

The sixth summit between the European Union and Latin America and the Caribbean in 2010 identified new pathways for biregional co-operation in the Madrid Declaration, which emphasized partnership in the areas of innovation and technology for sustainable development and social inclusion. The summit defined the long-term goal of achieving a common ‘knowledge area’ and agreed on a Joint Initiative for Research and Innovation.

Some 17 countries, such as Argentina, Brazil and Chile, are participating in a key project within this initiative entitled ALCUE Net, which runs from 2013 to 2017; this project has established a joint platform for policy-makers, research institutions and the private sector from both regions in four thematic areas:

- information and communication technologies;
- the bio-economy;
- biodiversity and climate change; and
- renewable energies.

A second project with joint calls (ERANet LAC) is implementing projects in these four areas. There were €11 million available for the first call for project proposals (2014–2015) and a similar amount for the second call (2015–2016). The partners also carried out a foresight exercise in 2015 to build a common long-term vision for biregional co-operation.

=== International scientific and technical cooperation ===
As of 2022, the European Union has signed international agreements for scientific and technical cooperation with the following countries:

- Algeria
- Argentina
- Australia
- Brazil
- Canada
- Chile
- People's Republic of China
- Egypt
- India
- Israel
- Japan
- Jordan
- Kazakhstan
- (South Korea) Republic of Korea
- Mexico
- Morocco
- New Zealand
- Russia
- Saudi Arabia
- South Africa
- Tunisia
- Turkey
- Ukraine
- United Kingdom
- United States

=== Sources ===
This article incorporates text from a free content work. Licensed under CC-BY-SA IGO 3.0. Text taken from UNESCO Science Report: towards 2030, UNESCO, UNESCO Publishing.

== See also ==
- Economic Partnership Agreements
- Enlargement of the European Union
- European Union's economic relationships with third countries
- European Union's scientific cooperation with third countries
- Eurosphere
- International investment agreements of the European Union
- List of countries by leading trade partners
- Potential enlargement of the European Union
- Trade agreements of the European Union

=== Foreign relations of EU member states ===
- Austria
- Belgium
- Bulgaria
- Croatia
- Cyprus
- Czech Republic
- Denmark
- Estonia
- Finland
- France
- Germany
- Greece
- Hungary
- (Republic of Ireland) Ireland
- Italy
- Latvia
- Lithuania
- Luxembourg
- Malta
- Netherlands
- Poland
- Portugal
- Romania
- Slovakia
- Slovenia
- Spain
- Sweden
