= European Neighbourhood Instrument =

European Union financial institution

The European Neighbourhood Instrument (ENI) came into force in 2014. It was the financial arm of the European Neighbourhood Policy, the EU's foreign policy towards its neighbours to the East and to the South. It had a number of programmes. In 2021, the ENI was merged into the new organization Global Europe.

== History and objectives ==
The six ENI targets were:

1. Promoting human rights and fundamental freedoms, the rule of law, equality, sustainable democracy, good governance and a thriving civil society;
2. Achieving progressive integration into the EU internal market and enhanced co-operation including through legislative approximation and regulatory convergence, institution building and investments;
3. Creating conditions for well managed mobility of people and promotion of people-to-people contacts;
4. Encouraging development, poverty reduction, internal economic, social and territorial cohesion, rural development, climate action and disaster resilience;
5. Promoting confidence building and other measures contributing to security and the prevention and settlement of conflicts;
6. Enhancing sub-regional, regional and Neighbourhood wide collaboration as well as Cross-Border Cooperation.

The ENI, effective from 2014 to 2020, replaced the European Neighbourhood and Partnership Instrument - known as the ENPI. This cooperation instrument continued to be managed by DG Development and Cooperation - EuropeAid, which turns decisions taken on a political level into actions on the ground. ENPI funding approved for the period 2007-2013 was €11.2 billion.

The 16 ENI partner countries are: Algeria, Egypt, Israel, Jordan, Lebanon, Libya, Morocco, Palestine, Syria, Tunisia, in the South, and Armenia, Azerbaijan, Belarus, Georgia, Moldova, Ukraine in the East.

With Russia, the EU has a separate Strategic Partnership.

The EU Neighbourhood Info Centre was launched in January 2009 by the European Commission to make more known the relationship between the EU and its neighbours as part of the European Neighbourhood Policy.

== See also ==
- Eastern Partnership
- Foreign relations of the European Union
- Potential enlargement of the European Union
