= Trade agreements of the European Union =

Overview of trade agreements in the European Union

EU Trade agreements European Union Agreement in force Agreement provisionally applied Agreement signed, but not applied Agreement initialed, not signed Agreement being negotiated Agreement negotiations on hold/suspended

The European Union negotiates trade agreements on behalf of all of its member states, as the member states have granted the EU an "exclusive competence" to conclude trade agreements. Even so, member states' governments control every step of the process (via the Council of the European Union, whose members are national ministers from each national government):

- Before negotiations start, member states' governments (via the Council of Ministers) approve the negotiating mandate;
- During negotiations, member states' governments are regularly briefed on the progress of negotiations and can update the negotiations mandate or suspend negotiations;
- Upon conclusion of negotiations, member states' governments decide whether the agreement should be signed;
- After approval from the European Parliament and (in case the agreement covers areas other than trade such as investment protection) upon ratification in each member state parliament, member states' governments decide whether the agreement should be concluded and enter into effect.

== Trade agreements in force ==
State	No of jurisdictions represented (Note: Excluding the EU and its member states)	Signed	Provisional application	In force since	Notes	Relations
Akrotiri and Dhekelia	1	2003		2004 (Note: From 2021 under the provisions of the Brexit withdrawal agreement (Protocol relating to the sovereign base areas of the United Kingdom of Great Britain and Northern Ireland in Cyprus))	Customs union	
Albania	1	2006	2006 (Note: Entry into force of Interim Agreement)	2009	SAA	Negotiating for EU accession
Algeria	1	2002		2005	Euro-mediterranean AA	Algeria–European Union relations
Andean Community; Colombia; Ecuador; Peru	3	2012	2013, 2017	2024	FTA	
Andorra	1	1990		1991	Customs union	Andorra–EU relations
Angola	1	2023		2024	SIFA	
Armenia	1	2017		2021	Comprehensive and Enhanced Partnership Agreement Includes investment provisions according to the UN database	Armenia–European Union relations
Azerbaijan	1	1996		1999	Partnership and Cooperation Agreement Includes investment provisions according to the UN database	Azerbaijan–European Union relations
Belarus	1	1989		1990/1991	EEC-Euratom-Soviet Union Agreement on trade and commercial and economic cooperation	Belarus–European Union relations
Bosnia and Herzegovina	1	2008	2008	2015	SAA	Candidate for EU accession
Central America; Costa Rica; Guatemala; Honduras; Nicaragua; Panama; El Salvador	6	2012	2013	2024	AA	Central America–European Union Association Agreement
Chile	1	2002, 2023	2003, 2024	2005 2025	AA, Interim & Updated EU-Chile AA	
China		1985		1985	EU-China Agreement on Trade and Economic Cooperation Includes investment provisions according to the UN database	China–European Union relations
Egypt	1	2001		2004	Euro-mediterranean AA	Egypt–European Union relations
Faroe Islands	1	1996		1997	Autonomous entity of Denmark	Faroe Islands-EU relations
Georgia	1	2014	2014	2016	AA incl DCFTA Includes investment provisions according to the UN database	Georgia–EU relations and Candidate for EU accession
Iceland	1	1992		1994	EEA	Iceland–EU relations
Iraq	1	2012		2018	Partnership and Cooperation Agreement	Iraq–European Union relations
Israel	1	1995	1996	2000	Euro-Mediterranean AA	Israel–EU relations
Japan	1	2018		2019	Economic Partnership Agreement	Japan-EU relations
Jordan	1	1997		2002	Euro-Mediterranean AA	Jordan–EU relations
Kazakhstan	1	2015		2020	Enhanced Partnership and Cooperation Agreement (EPCA) Includes investment provisions according to the UN database	Kazakhstan–European Union relations
Kyrgyz Republic	1			1999	Partnership and Cooperation Agreement Includes investment provisions according to the UN database	Kyrgyzstan–EU relations
Kenya	1	2023		2024	Economic Partnership Agreement	
Kosovo	1	2015		2016	SAA	Potential candidate for EU accession
Lebanon	1	2002		2006	Euro-Mediterranean AA	Lebanon–EU relations
Liechtenstein	1	1992		1995	EEA	Liechtenstein–EU relations
Mexico	1	1997		2000	FTA	Mexico–EU relations
Moldova	1	2014	2014	2016	Moldova–European Union Association Agreement incl European Union–Moldova Deep and Comprehensive Free Trade Area	Moldova–EU relations and Negotiating for EU accession
Monaco	1			1958	Franco-Monegasque Customs Convention (customs union)	Monaco–EU relations
Montenegro	1	2007	2008	2010	SAA	Negotiating for EU accession
Morocco	1	1996		2000	Euro-Mediterranean AA	Morocco–EU relations
New Zealand	1	2023		2024	FTA	New Zealand–EU relations
North Macedonia	1	2001	2001	2004	SAA	Negotiating for EU accession
Norway	1	1992		1994	EEA	Norway–EU relations
EU's Overseas Countries and Territories	13	2001		2001	Association of the OCTs with the EU	
Palestinian Authority	1	1997		1997	Euro-Mediterranean AA	Palestine–EU relations
Russia	1	1994		1997	Partnership and Cooperation Agreement Includes investment provisions according to the UN database	Russia–European Union relations
San Marino	1	1991	1992 (Note: Interim Agreement)	2002	Customs union	San Marino–EU relations
Serbia	1	2008	2010	2013	SAA	Negotiating for EU accession
Singapore	1	2018		2019 2026	FTA, Digital Trade Agreement	Singapore–European Union relations
South Africa	1	1999	2000	2004	ATDC (Note: Agreement on Trade, Development and Cooperation)	South Africa–EU relations
South Korea	1	2010	2011	2015	FTA	South Korea–EU relations
Switzerland	1	1972		1973	Trade agreement	Switzerland–EU relations
Syria	1	1977		1977 (Note: Partially suspended between 2011 and 2026 in response to serious human rights violations by the regime of Bashar al-Assad in the Syrian Civil War)	Cooperation agreement	Syria–EU relations
Tajikistan	1			2010	Partnership and Co-operation Agreement Includes investment provisions according to the UN database	Tajikistan–EU relations
Tunisia	1	1995		1998	Euro-Mediterranean AA	Tunisia–European Union relations
Turkey	1	1995 (Note: Decision of the EC-Turkey Association Council)		1995	Customs union Includes investment provisions according to the UN database	Turkey–EU relations
Turkmenistan	1	1989		1990/1991	EEC-Euratom-Soviet Union Agreement on trade and commercial and economic cooperation	Turkmenistan–European Union relations
Ukraine	1	2014	2016	2017	Ukraine–European Union Association Agreement incl DCFTA Includes investment provisions according to the UN database	Ukraine–EU relations and Negotiating for EU accession
Uzbekistan	1			1999	Partnership and Cooperation Agreement Includes investment provisions according to the UN database	Uzbekistan–European Union relations
United Kingdom (Note: Includes Jersey, Guernsey and the Isle of Man with regards to trade in goods and fisheries. For Northern Ireland, a more comprehensive arrangement is in place with regards to trade in goods based on the Withdrawal Agreement.)	1	2020	2021	2021	Trade and Cooperation Agreement	United Kingdom–EU relations
United States	1	2025		2026	Agreement on Reciprocal, Fair, and Balanced Trade	United States-EU relations
Vietnam	1	2019		2020	EVFTA	Vietnam–EU relations

== Trade agreements provisionally applied ==
State	Signed	Provisional Application	Ratification	Notes	Relations
Cameroon	2009	2014	22 / 30	Interim agreement with a view to an EPA	
Canada	2016	2017	19 / 30	Comprehensive Economic and Trade Agreement	Canada–European Union relations
CARIFORUM States; Antigua and Barbuda; Bahamas; Barbados; Belize; Dominica; Dominican Republic; Grenada; Guyana; Haiti; Jamaica; Saint Kitts and Nevis; Saint Lucia; Saint Vincent and the Grenadines; Suriname; Trinidad and Tobago	2008	2008	37 / 44	EPA - Croatia acceded to the agreement on 28 November 2017	
Côte d'Ivoire	2009	2016	25 / 30	Stepping Stone EPA	
Eastern and Southern Africa States; Comoros; Madagascar; Mauritius; Seychelles; Zimbabwe	2009	2012, 2019	6 / 35	Interim Agreement for establishing a framework for an EPA	
Ghana	2016	2016	14 / 30	Stepping Stone EPA	
Mercosur; Argentina; Brazil; Paraguay; Uruguay	2026	2026	5 / 6	European Union–Mercosur free trade agreement.	European Union–Mercosur relations
Pacific States; Fiji; Papua New Guinea; Samoa; Solomon Islands	2009	2009, 2014, 2018, 2020	4 / 5	Interim Partnership Agreement	
South African Development Community members Botswana; Lesotho; Mozambique; Namibia; South Africa; Eswatini	2016	2016	22 / 35	Economic Partnership Agreement	

== Agreement signed (awaiting application) ==
State	Signed	Provisional Application	Ratification	Notes	Relations
Andorra; San Marino	2026			Andorra—San Marino—European Union Association Agreement	Andorra–European Union relations San Marino–European Union relations
Indonesia	2026			Comprehensive Economic Partnership Agreement (CEPA) and Investment Protection Agreement (IPA)	Indonesia–European Union relations
Kyrgyzstan	2024		11 / 29	Enhanced Partnership and Cooperation Agreement	
Mexico	2026		1 / 2	Modernised Global Agreement (MGA) and interim Trade Agreement (iTA)	Mexico–EU relations
South Korea	2026		1 / 2	Digital Trade Agreement (DTA)	South Korea–European Union relations
Uzbekistan	2025		6 / 29	Enhanced Partnership and Cooperation Agreement	Uzbekistan–European Union relations

== Agreements being finalised (negotiations concluded, but not signed) ==
State	Negotiations Concluded	Signed	Provisional Application	Ratification	Notes
Australia	24 March 2026	No	No	No	Free Trade Agreement
Canada	30 October 2026	No	No	No	Digital Trade Agreement
China	30 December 2020	No	No	No	Comprehensive Agreement on Investment
Economic Community of West African States members Benin; Burkina Faso; Cabo Verde; Côte d'Ivoire; Gambia; Ghana; Guinea; Guinea-Bissau; Liberia; Mali; Mauritania; Niger; Nigeria; Senegal; Sierra Leone; Togo	6 February 2014		No	No	Economic Partnership Agreement
East African Community members Burundi; Kenya; Rwanda; Tanzania; Uganda	16 October 2014		No	Ratified by Rwanda; In force with Kenya	Economic Partnership Agreement
Eastern and Southern Africa States; Comoros; Madagascar; Mauritius; Seychelles	10 Jun 2026	No	No	No	Economic Partnership Agreement
India	27 January 2026	No	No	No	Free Trade Agreement
Tajikistan	December 2024	No	No	No	Enhanced Partnership and Cooperation Agreement

== Negotiating new or modernised agreements ==
State	New or modernized agreement being negotiated	Status
Azerbaijan	Partnership and Cooperation Agreement	Negotiations on modernisation began in 2017 and were paused in 2019. Negotiations were relaunched in 2026
India	Investment Protection Agreement, Geographical Indications Agreement	Negotiations on the Investment Protection Agreement and Geographical Indications Agreement are ongoing as of April 2026.
Kazakhstan	Enhanced Partnership and Cooperation Agreement (EPCA)	Negotiations on adding a protocol to the EPCA regarding Geographical Indications (GIs) for agricultural products and foodstuffs, wines and spirits are ongoing
Malaysia	Free Trade Agreement	Negotiations launched in 2010, paused in 2012 and resumed in 2025
Niue	Economic Partnership Agreements as part of the Pacific States Interim Partnership Agreement	Informed the EU of its intention to accede to the EPA.
Philippines	Free Trade Agreement	Negotiations launched in 2015 Substantial agreement reached in September 2026.
Timor-Leste	Economic Partnership Agreements as part of the Pacific States Interim Partnership Agreement	Informed the EU of its intention to accede to the EPA.
Thailand	Free Trade Agreement	Negotiations launched in 2013, paused in 2014, and resumed in 2023.
Tonga	Economic Partnership Agreements as part of the Pacific States Interim Partnership Agreement	Informed the EU of its intention to accede to the EPA.
Tuvalu	Economic Partnership Agreements as part of the Pacific States Interim Partnership Agreement	Informed the EU of its intention to accede to the EPA.
United Arab Emirates	Free Trade Agreement	Negotiations launched in April 2025.
Vanuatu	Economic Partnership Agreements as part of the Pacific States Interim Partnership Agreement	Informed the EU of its intention to accede to the EPA.

== Negotiations on hold ==
Country or bloc	Agreement being negotiated	Status
Belarus	Partnership and Cooperation Agreement	Concluded in 1995, not yet ratified by the European Union
Cooperation Council for the Arab States of the Gulf States; Bahrain; Kuwait; Oman; Qatar; Saudi Arabia; United Arab Emirates	Free Trade Agreement	Negotiations launched in 1990, suspended since 2008
Central Africa; Central African Republic; Chad; Republic of Congo; Equatorial Guinea; Gabon; Democratic Republic of Congo; São Tomé and Principe	Economic Partnership Agreement	Negotiations launched in 2003, paused until further notice in 2011
Eastern and Southern Africa States; Ethiopia; Djibouti; Malawi; Somalia; Sudan; Zambia	Economic Partnership Agreement	Negotiations launched in 2004, paused until further notice in 2011
Monaco	European Union Association Agreement	Negotiations launched in 2015, but halted in 2023
Morocco	Deep and Comprehensive Free Trade Area	Negotiations launched in 2013, on hold since 2014 at Morocco’s request
Myanmar	Investment protection agreement	Negotiations launched in 2015
Tunisia	Deep and Comprehensive Free Trade Area	Negotiations launched in 2015, on hold since 2019

== Obsolete agreements ==
Country or bloc	Agreement	Signed	Active	Obsolete
Croatia	SAA	29 October 2001	1 March 2001	1 July 2013
United States	Transatlantic Trade and Investment Partnership	No	No	9 April 2019

=== Soviet Union and its successors ===
The European Economic Community established relations with the Soviet Union through the conclusion of the EEC-Euratom-Soviet Union Agreement on trade and commercial and economic cooperation in 1989. After 1991, all 12 successor states to the Soviet Union applied the agreement concluded in 1989 in bilateral relations as their trade agreement with the European Communities and the European Union. As of 2025, the Agreement is in force between the European Union and the Republic of Belarus and between the European Union and Turkmenistan. Previously, the Agreement applied to relations with other successor states of the Soviet Union, but has been replaced by separate bilateral agreements with each post-Soviet country.

== Competence ==
The European Court of Justice has held that investor-state arbitration provisions (including a dedicated tribunal planned by some free trade agreements) falls under competency shared between European Union and its member states and that for this reason, the ratification of such mixed agreements should be approved by the EU as well as by each of the union's member states. This court decision has resulted in a new architecture of external trade negotiations which will have two components:

- a free trade agreement - related exclusively to trade matters - which can be adopted at the EU level;
- an investment agreement - containing investment, arbitration and other non-trade provisions - which needs to be ratified by the member states as well.

== Impact to consumers ==
One study found that the trade agreements that the EU implemented over the period 1993-2013 have, on average, increased the quality of imported goods by 7% and therefore "lowered quality-adjusted prices by close to 7%," without having much of an impact on the non-adjusted price.

== No trade agreements ==
- The United States of America and the European Union efforts have not yielded a comprehensive, bilateral free trade agreement. "They also have worked to address these issues multilaterally in the WTO. The United States engages with the European Commission on trade policy matters. Over the years, many Members of Congress have voiced support for ... negotiations to eliminate and reduce remaining tariff and nontariff barriers. The current outlook for bilateral trade agreement negotiations is unclear.", according to congress.gov as of 2022.

According to the European Commission's website, as of 2025:

- there is no bilateral trade agreement between the EU and Iran.
- the EU has no trade arrangements with Libya.
- "There are no preferential trade arrangements between Venezuela and the EU. The EU-Venezuela trade relationship is based on World Trade Organization (WTO) rules and tariffs."
- Myanmar is a member of WTO since 1995 and, as a least developed country, benefits from the EU's Everything But Arms (EBA) scheme, which grants unilateral duty-free, quota-free access for all exports except arms and ammunition to the EU.
- "Accession to the EU's Pacific EPA is open to other Pacific ACP states. On 27 January 2025, the EU Council of Ministers adopted a proposal for the accession of Niue, Tonga and Tuvalu to the EPA. Accession processes are also underway with the Federated States of Micronesia, the Republic of the Marshall Islands, Timor Leste and Vanuatu."

== See also ==
- Economic Partnership Agreements
- EU-ACP
- EUR.1 movement certificate
- Euro-Mediterranean free trade area
- European Union Association Agreement
- Everything but Arms
- Free trade agreements of the European Union
- Free trade agreements of the United Kingdom
- Free trade area
- Free trade areas in Europe
- List of bilateral free trade agreements
- List of free trade agreements
- List of the largest trading partners of the European Union
- Trade deal negotiation between the UK and EU (2020)
- Trade defence instrument
- United States free trade agreements
