= Nepal–European Union relations =

Euro-Nepalese relations
- European Union: Nepal

Nepal–European Union relations are the relations between Nepal and the European Union (EU). The role of the European Union is to present, explain and implement EU policies, analyze and report on the political, social, and economic situation in Nepal, and to conducts negotiations in accordance with a given mandate.

In the context of Nepal, the European Union has been focussing mainly on three sectors: education, peace and stability, and trade facilitation and economic capacity building. Apart from these three sectors, we are also active in areas as varied as the protection and promotion of human rights, food security, conservation of the environment, safe migration, assisting to ensure transparent and effective public finance management, and introducing sustainable production and consumption practices. The EU is also working with the Government of Nepal and local communities in disaster risk reduction and climate change adaptation and mitigation.

== See also ==
- Foreign relations of Nepal
- Foreign relations of the European Union
