= International investment agreements of the European Union =

The European Union has concluded the following Treaties with Investment Provisions (TIPs) and Investment Related Instruments (IRIs) according to the database of UNCTAD.

== Treaties with Investment Provisions ==
No.	Short title	Status	Parties	Date of signature	Date of entry into force
1	EU - Kyrgyzstan EPCA (2024)	Signed (not in force)	Kyrgyzstan	25/06/2024	
2	EU - Kenya EPA (2023)	In force	Kenya	18/12/2023	01/07/2024
3	Chile - EU Advanced Framework Agreement (2023)	Signed (not in force)	Chile	13/12/2023	
4	Angola - EU SIFA (2023)	In force	Angola	17/11/2023	01/09/2024
5	ACP - EU Samoa Agreement (2023)	Signed (not in force)	ACP (African, Caribbean and Pacific Group of States)	15/11/2023	
6	EU - New Zealand FTA (2023)	In force	New Zealand	09/07/2023	01/05/2024
7	EU - Malaysia Partnership and Cooperation Agreement (2022)	Signed (not in force)	Malaysia	14/12/2022	
8	EU - Thailand Framework Agreement on Comprehensive Partnership and Cooperation (2022)	Signed (not in force)	Thailand	14/12/2022	
9	EU - United Kingdom Trade and Cooperation Agreement (2020)	In force	United Kingdom	30/12/2020	01/05/2021
10	EU - Viet Nam FTA (2019)	In force	Viet Nam	30/06/2019	01/08/2020
11	EU - Viet Nam IPA (2019)	Signed (not in force)	Viet Nam	30/06/2019	
12	EU - Singapore FTA (2018)	In force	Singapore	15/10/2018	21/11/2019
13	EU - Singapore IPA (2018)	Signed (not in force)	Singapore	15/10/2018	
14	EU - Japan EPA (2018)	In force	Japan	17/07/2018	01/02/2019
15	Armenia - EU CEPA (2017)	In force	Armenia	24/11/2017	01/03/2021
16	Australia - EU Framework Agreement (2017)	In force	Australia	07/08/2017	21/10/2022
17	Canada - EU CETA (2016)	Signed (not in force)	Canada	30/10/2016	
18	EU - SADC EPA Group Agreement (2016)	Signed (not in force)	Botswana, Eswatini, Lesotho, Mozambique, Namibia, South Africa	10/06/2016	
19	EU - Kazakhstan EPCA (2015)	In force	Kazakhstan	21/12/2015	01/03/2020
20	EU - Georgia Association Agreement (2014)	In force	Georgia	27/06/2014	01/07/2016
21	EU - Moldova Association Agreement (2014)	In force	Moldova, Republic of	27/06/2014	01/07/2016
22	EU - Ukraine Association Agreement (2014)	In force	Ukraine	27/06/2014	01/09/2017
23	Central America - EU Association Agreement (2012)	In force	CACM (Central American Common Market)	29/06/2012	01/10/2013
24	EU - Viet Nam Framework PCA (2012)	Signed (not in force)	Viet Nam	27/06/2012	
25	Colombia - Ecuador - EU - Peru Trade Agreement (2012)	In force	Colombia, Ecuador, Peru	26/06/2012	01/06/2013
26	EU - Iraq Cooperation Agreement (2012)	In force	Iraq	11/05/2012	01/08/2018
27	EU - Korea, Republic of FTA (2010)	In force	Korea, Republic of	06/10/2010	01/07/2011
28	EU - Korea, Republic of Framework Agreement (2010)	In force	Korea, Republic of	10/05/2010	01/06/2014
29	Eastern and Southern Africa States - EU Interim EPA (2009)	Signed (not in force)	Comoros, Madagascar, Mauritius, Seychelles, Zimbabwe	29/08/2009	
30	EU - SADC Interim Agreement (2009)	Signed (not in force)	Botswana, Eswatini, Lesotho, Mozambique	22/01/2009	
31	EU - Cameroon EPA (2009)	In force	Cameroon	15/01/2009	04/08/2014
32	Cote d'Ivoire - EC EPA (2008)	Signed (not in force)	Côte d'Ivoire	26/11/2008	
33	CARIFORUM - EC EPA (2008)	In force	CARICOM (Caribbean Community), Dominican Republic	15/10/2008	01/01/2009
34	Bosnia - EC Stabilization Agreement (2008)	In force	Bosnia and Herzegovina	16/06/2008	01/06/2015
35	EC - Serbia Association Agreement (2008)	In force	Serbia	29/04/2008	01/09/2013
36	EU - Montenegro Association Agreement (2007)	In force	Montenegro	15/10/2007	01/05/2010
37	Albania - EC Association Agreement (2006)	In force	Albania	12/06/2006	01/04/2009
38	EC - Tajikistan Partnership Agreement (2004)	In force	Tajikistan	11/10/2004	01/01/2010
39	ANDEAN - EC Cooperation Agreement (2003)	Signed (not in force)	ANCOM (Andean Community)	15/12/2003	
40	Chile - EC Association Agreement (2002)	In force	Chile	18/11/2002	01/02/2003
41	EC - Lebanon Association Agreement (2002)	In force	Lebanon	17/06/2002	01/04/2006
42	Algeria - EC Association Agreement (2002)	In force	Algeria	22/04/2002	01/09/2005
43	EC - OCT Association (2001)	In force	OCT (Overseas Countries and Territories)	27/11/2001	02/12/2001
44	EC - Pakistan Cooperation Agreement (2001)	In force	Pakistan	24/11/2001	01/09/2004
45	EC - Egypt Association Agreement (2001)	In force	Egypt	25/06/2001	01/06/2004
46	EC - Macedonia Association Agreement (2001)	In force	North Macedonia	09/04/2001	01/04/2004
47	Mexico - EC Cooperation Agreement (2001)	In force	Mexico	27/02/2001	01/03/2001
48	Cotonou Agreement (2000)	In force	ACP (African, Caribbean and Pacific Group of States)	23/06/2000	01/04/2003
49	Bangladesh - EC Cooperation Agreement (2000)	In force	Bangladesh	22/05/2000	01/03/2001
50	EC - Turkmenistan Interim Trade Agreement (1999)	In force	Turkmenistan	10/11/1999	01/08/2010
51	EC - South Africa Cooperation Agreement (1999)	In force	South Africa	11/10/1999	01/05/2004
52	EU - Turkmenistan PCA (1998)	Signed (not in force)	Turkmenistan	25/05/1998	
53	EC - Yemen Cooperation Agreement (1997)	In force	Yemen	25/11/1997	02/07/1998
54	EC - Jordan Association Agreement (1997)	In force	Jordan	24/11/1997	01/05/2002
55	Cambodia - EC Cooperation Agreement (1997)	In force	Cambodia	29/04/1997	01/11/1999
56	EC - Lao Cooperation Agreement (1997)	In force	Lao People's Democratic Republic	29/04/1997	01/12/1997
57	EC - Palestine Association Agreement (1997)	In force	State of Palestine	17/02/1997	01/07/1997
58	EC - Korea, Republic of Cooperation Agreement (1996)	Terminated	Korea, Republic of	28/10/1996	01/04/2001
59	EC - Uzbekistan Cooperation Agreement (1996)	In force	Uzbekistan	21/06/1996	01/07/1999
60	Armenia - EC Cooperation Agreement (1996)	In force	Armenia	22/04/1996	01/07/1999
61	Azerbaijan - EC Cooperation Agreement (1996)	In force	Azerbaijan	22/04/1996	01/07/1999
62	EC - Georgia Cooperation Agreement (1996)	Terminated	Georgia	22/04/1996	01/07/1999
63	EC - Morocco Association Agreement (1996)	In force	Morocco	26/02/1996	01/03/2000
64	Ankara Agreement (1995)	In force	Türkiye	22/12/1995	31/12/1995
65	EC - Mercosur Cooperation Agreement (1995)	In force	MERCOSUR (Mercado Común Sudamericano)	15/12/1995	01/07/1999
66	EC - Israel Association Agreement (1995)	In force	Israel	20/11/1995	01/06/2000
67	EC - Nepal Cooperation Agreement (1995)	In force	Nepal	20/11/1995	01/06/1996
68	EC - Vietnam Cooperation Agreement (1995)	In force	Viet Nam	17/07/1995	01/06/1998
69	EC - Tunisia Association Agreement (1995)	In force	Tunisia	17/07/1995	01/03/1998
70	Belarus - EC Cooperation Agreement (1995)	Signed (not in force)	Belarus	06/03/1995	
71	EC - Kyrgyzstan Cooperation Agreement (1995)	In force	Kyrgyzstan	09/02/1995	01/07/1999
72	EC - Kazakhstan Cooperation Agreement (1995)	Terminated	Kazakhstan	23/01/1995	01/07/1999
73	EC - Moldova PCA (1994)	Terminated	Moldova, Republic of	28/11/1994	01/07/1998
74	EC - Sri Lanka Cooperation Agreement (1994)	In force	Sri Lanka	18/07/1994	01/04/1995
75	EC - Russia PCA (1994)	In force	Russian Federation	24/06/1994	01/12/1997
76	EC - Ukraine Cooperation Agreement (1994)	Terminated	Ukraine	14/06/1994	01/03/1998
77	EC - India Cooperation Agreement (1993)	In force	India	20/12/1993	01/08/1994
78	Brazil - EC Cooperation Agreement (1992)	In force	Brazil	29/06/1992	01/11/1995
79	EEC - Mongolia Trade Cooperation Agreement (1992)	In force	Mongolia	16/06/1992	01/03/1993
80	EC - Macao Trade Agreement (1992)	In force	Macao, China SAR	15/06/1992	01/01/1993
81	EC - EFTA (1992)	In force	EFTA (European Free Trade Association)	02/05/1992	01/01/1994
82	EC - Paraguay Cooperation Agreement (1992)	In force	Paraguay	03/02/1992	01/11/1992
83	EC - Uruguay Cooperation Agreement (1991)	In force	Uruguay	04/11/1991	01/01/1994
84	EC - GCC Cooperation Agreement (1988)	In force	GCC (Gulf Cooperation Council)	15/06/1988	01/01/1990
85	China - EC Trade and Cooperation Agreement (1985)	In force	China	21/05/1985	22/09/1985
86	ASEAN - EU Cooperation Agreement (1980)	In force	ASEAN (Association of South-East Asian Nations)	07/03/1980	01/10/1980
87	EU Treaty (1957)	In force		25/03/1957	01/01/1958
88	IFD Agreement	In negotiation			

== Investment Related Instruments ==
No.	Short title	Date of adoption	Level	Type
1	EU Model Clauses for BITs 2023	21/09/2023	Regional/Plurilateral	Model agreements
2	EU Code of Conduct for European Enterprise	1999	Regional/Plurilateral	Guidelines, principles, resolutions and similar
