= Libya–European Union relations =

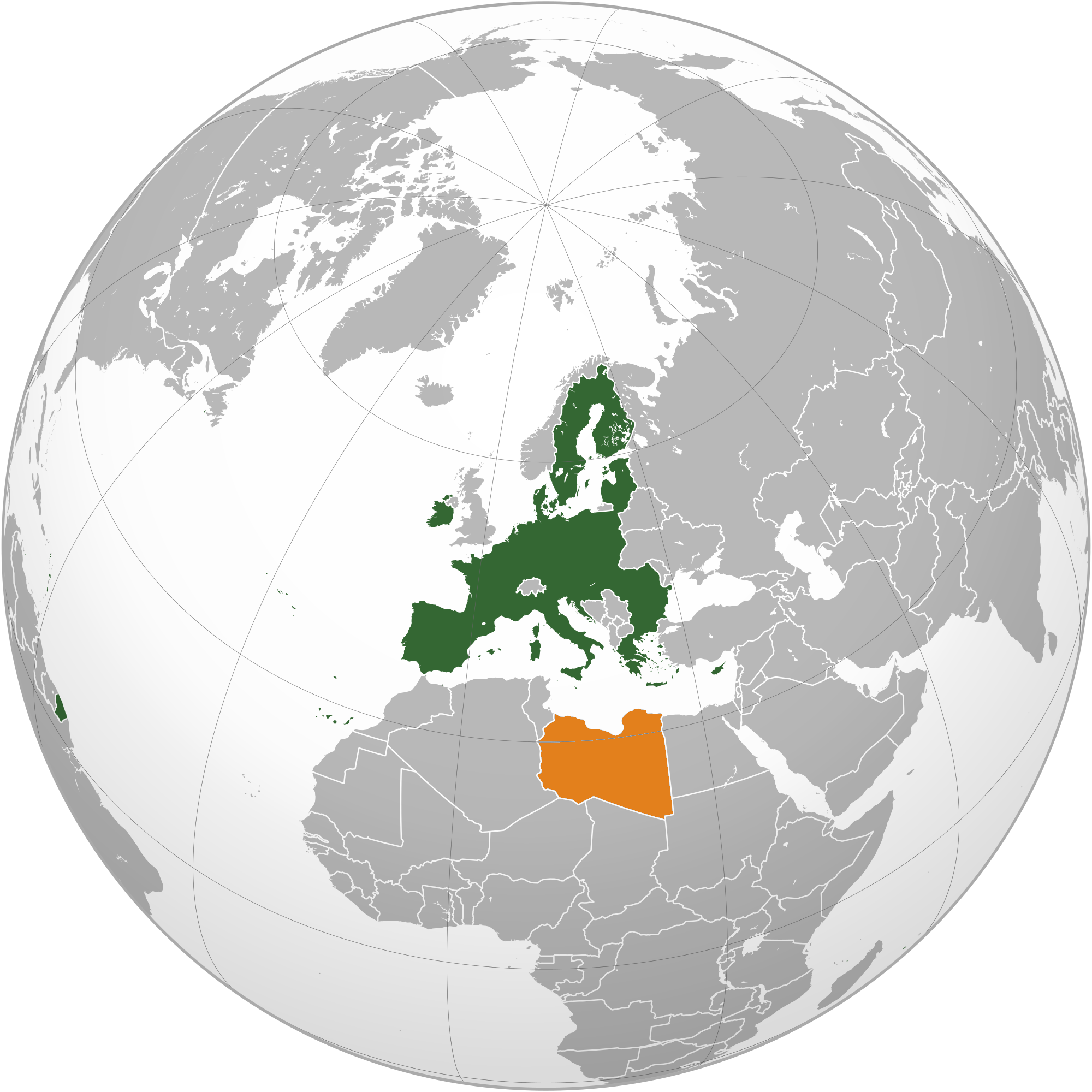

- Libya: European Union

Libya–European Union relations are the foreign relations between the country of Libya and the European Union.

Prior to the 2011 Libyan civil war, the EU and Libya were negotiating a cooperation agreement which has now been frozen. The EU worked to apply sanctions over the Libyan conflict, provide aid and some members participated in military action.

== History of European-Libyan Affairs ==
Libya has had a long and tumultuous relationship with mainland Europe.

=== The Greek, Persian, Carthaginian, and Roman Empires ===
In 630 BCE, the Ancient Greeks colonized Eastern Libya and founded the city of Cyrene. Within 200 years, four more important Greek cities were established in the area that became known as Cyrenaica. The Greeks of the Pentapolis resisted encroachments by the Ancient Egyptians from the East, as well as by the Carthaginians from the West, but in 525 BCE the Persian army of Cambyses II overran Cyrenaica, which for the next two centuries remained under Persian or Egyptian rule. Alexander was greeted by the Greeks when he entered Cyrenaica in 331 BCE, and Eastern Libya again fell under the control of the Greeks, this time as part of the Ptolemaic Kingdom. The Carthaginian Empire rose to power to hold sway over the coast of much of modern-day Libya, but was later enveloped into the Roman Empire after the Punic Wars.

=== The Ottoman Empire and Fascist Italy ===
Libya was part of the Ottoman Empire, which fell apart following the events of WWI. From 1912 to 1943, Libya was controlled by Italy. Italy lost the land during the North African Campaign of WWII. The United Kingdom and France administered the region until on 24 December 1951, Libya declared its independence as the United Kingdom of Libya.

=== The Second Libyan Civil War and the European Migrant Crisis ===
Prior to the 2011 Libyan civil war, the EU and Libya were negotiating a cooperation agreement which has now been frozen. The EU worked to apply sanctions over the Libyan conflict, provide aid and some members participated in military action. The ongoing Second Libyan Civil War and European Migrant Crisis are causing tensions on both sides of the Mediterranean.

In July 2025, the EU's Commissioner for Migration was denied entry to Libya.

== The Malta Declaration ==
The Malta Declaration (EU) is a declaration made on 3 February 2017 during the European migrant crisis by leaders of the European Union in Malta, which held the presidency at the time, that focuses on measures to stem the flow of immigration from Libya to Italy and the EU.

The EU is closely working with Libya on the safety of migrants with such actions as Operation Sophia and the training of Libyan Coast Guards.
