= Trade, Development and Cooperation Agreement =

The Trade, Development and Cooperation Agreement (TDCA) is a treaty concluded between the European Community and South Africa. The treaty consists of three areas of agreement. First of all, it includes a free trade agreement between the EU and South Africa. Secondly, it includes development aid. Thirdly, it includes several areas of cooperation, such as economic and social cooperation.

The TDCA was signed in 1999 and came into force in 2000.
