= EEC–Soviet Union cooperation agreement =

1989 international trade agreement

The Agreement between the European Economic Community and the European Atomic Energy Community and the Union of Soviet Socialist Republics on trade and commercial and economic cooperation (Russian: Соглашение между СССР и Европейским экономическим сообществом и Европейским сообществом по атомной энергии о торговле, коммерческом и экономическом сотрудничестве) is an international agreement of European Economic Community (EEC), the Euratom and the Soviet Union (USSR) signed in Brussels on 18 December 1989 and came into force on 1 April 1990. As of 2025, the Agreement is in force between the European Union and the Republic of Belarus and between the European Union and Turkmenistan. Previously, the Agreement applied to relations with other successor states of the Soviet Union, but has been replaced by separate bilateral agreements with each country.

== Background ==
According to Dr Wolfgang Mueller, under Mikhail Gorbachev, the USSR finally recognized the EEC in 1988.

On 25 June 1988, a Joint Declaration on the establishment of official relations between the European Economic Community and the Council for Mutual Economic Assistance (of which the Soviet Union was a member) was signed and entered into force on the same day.

On 31 December 1989, President of France Francois Mitterrand called for the creation of a "European confederation" designed to "associate all states of the continent in a common and permanent organization for exchanges, peace and security". This explicitly included the Soviet Union.

In February 1990, Eurosceptic British Prime Minister Margaret Thatcher proposed "a wider European association" that would rival or replace the European Community, and which the Soviet Union could join in the long term.

As the Kommersant newspaper wrote on 9 April 1990 after the Agreement enters into force on 1 April, "prior to the Agreement coming into force, the main feature of the European Communities’ common foreign trade policy towards the USSR was the existence of discriminatory quantitative restrictions on exports from the Soviet Union."

== Agreement ==
The Agreement between the European Economic Community and the European Atomic Energy Community and the Union of Soviet Socialist Republics on trade and commercial and economic cooperation was signed in Brussels on 18 December 1989 by Roland Dumas, the President-in-Office of the Council of the European Communities, Frans Andriessen, the Vice-President of the Commission of the European Communities and Eduard Shevardnadze, the Minister for Foreign Affairs of the Union of Soviet Socialist Republics.

On 26 February 1990, The Agreement between the European Economic Community and the European Atomic Energy Community and the Union of Soviet Socialist Republics on trade and commercial and economic cooperation is hereby approved on behalf of the European Economic Community by the Council.

On 27 February 1990, the Commission if the European Communities had decided that The Agreement between the European Economic Community and the European Atomic Energy Community and the Union of Soviet Socialist Republics on trade and commercial and economic cooperation is hereby concluded on behalf of the European Atomic Energy Community.

The instruments of notification of the completion of the procedures for the entry into force of the Agreement between the European Economic Community and the European Atomic Energy Community, on the one hand, and the Union of Soviet Socialist Republics, on the other, on trade and commercial and economic cooperation, signed in Brussels on 18 December 1989, having been exchanged on 28 February 1990, the Agreement entered into force on 1 April 1990, in accordance with Article 25 thereof.

== Application ==
As the Kommersant newspaper wrote on 9 April 1990, "the Agreement opens up broad prospects for the Soviet Union to participate in the process of European economic integration. The main element of the Agreement is the mutual granting of most-favoured-nation (MFN) treatment by the parties. MFN treatment will apply to customs duties, fees and taxes levied on imported goods, rules for the purchase and sale of goods on the domestic market, their transportation, as well as methods of payment and transfer of funds. By 1995, the European Communities undertook to abolish quantitative restrictions on exports from the USSR on 1200 product lines. This means that for a number of goods, the volume of quotas for exports from the USSR will be significantly increased, and for certain goods, quotas will not be set at all."

The Agreement outlines the framework for economic cooperation between the parties in areas of mutual interest. This includes energy, agriculture, transport, standardisation, exchange of economic information, development of financial services, tourism and training of specialists. The Joint Commission will meet annually in Moscow and Brussels. The first meeting is scheduled to take place in Moscow in May 1990.

=== Belarus ===
According to the European Commission's website, as of 2025,

The EU has not yet ratified the bilateral Partnership and Cooperation Agreement concluded with Belarus in 1995, due to Belarus' lack of commitment to democracy, and political and civil rights. The bilateral trade and economic relations therefore remain covered by the Trade and Cooperation Agreement concluded by the European Community with the Soviet Union in 1989, and subsequently endorsed by Belarus."

=== Turkmenistan ===
According to the European Commission's website, as of 2025,

A Partnership and Cooperation Agreement concluded with Turkmenistan in 1998 is yet to be ratified by all EU Member States. Pending ratification, an Interim Agreement on trade and trade-related matters entered into force on 1 August 2010. Other areas of cooperation remain based on the Trade and Cooperation Agreement signed with the Soviet Union in 1989 and subsequently endorsed by Turkmenistan."

== Replacement ==
=== Armenia ===
This agreement was replaced by an individual bilateral agreement (Article 101), which stated that relations had already been established with the Soviet Union.

=== Azerbaijan ===
This agreement was replaced by an individual bilateral agreement (Article 104), which stated that relations had already been established with the Soviet Union.

=== Georgia ===
This agreement was replaced by an individual bilateral agreement (Article 104), which stated that relations had already been established with the Soviet Union.

=== Moldova ===
This agreement was replaced by an individual bilateral agreement (Article 105), which stated that relations had already been established with the Soviet Union.

=== Russia ===
In the 1994 Agreement on partnership and cooperation establishing a partnership between the European Communities and their Member States, of one part, and the Russian Federation, of the other part, Contracting Parties recognized that the "Community and Russia wish to strengthen these links and to establish partnership and cooperation which would deepen and widen the relations established between them in the past in particular by the Agreement between the European Economic Community and the European Atomic Energy Community and the Union of Soviet Socialist Republics on Trade and Commercial and Economic Cooperation, signed on 18 December 1989".

According to the Article 112,

Upon its entry into force, and as far as relations between the Community and Russia are concerned, this Agreement shall replace, without prejudice to Article 22 (1), (3) and (5), the Agreement between the European Economic Community and the European Atomic Energy Community and the Union of Soviet Socialist Republics on trade and economic and commercial cooperation signed in Brussels on 18 December 1989."

=== Ukraine ===
This agreement was replaced by an individual bilateral agreement (Article 108), which stated that relations had already been established with the Soviet Union.

== See also ==
- Foreign relations of the European Union
- European Neighbourhood Policy
- Eastern Partnership
- European Integration
