= Sudan–European Union relations =

- European Union: Sudan

Sudan–European Union relations are the international relations between the European Union (EU) and the Republic of the Sudan.

== Historical relations ==
European Economic Community (EEC) cooperation with Sudan—a member of the Organisation of African, Caribbean and Pacific States (ACP)—ran under the aegis of the Lomé Convention. Following the 1989 Sudanese coup d'état and ensuing violation of human rights the European Community suspended development aid in March 1990. In absence of a legal framework for development, bar the humanitarian assistance funds provided via ECHO, relations were put on hold. In 1999, dialogue resumed.

Following the Sudanese revolution and the installment of a civilian-led government in September 2019, the EU has pledged support to the consolidation of the Sudanese transition to democracy. In June 2020, the EU co-hosted the High-Level Sudan Partnership Conference, where the EU Commission pledged 312 million euros to help crisis-stricken Sudan in addition to the economic support offered by the individual EU member states.

== Political relations ==
EU-Sudan political relations have been marked by growing concerns over human rights abuses amid Sudan's ongoing civil war. In March 2025, following the recapture of Khartoum by Sudanese military forces, the UN condemned reports of extrajudicial killings of civilians, allegedly executed by the army. These killings targeted civilians suspected of supporting the rival Rapid Support Forces (RSF). UN High Commissioner for Human Rights Volker Türk expressed his outrage, calling for an end to arbitrary executions. Despite video evidence showing executions by armed men, the Sudanese army has not commented on the reports. The UN has urged accountability for those responsible for these violations.
