= Eurafrica =

Proposal for a strategic partnership

Eurafrica (a portmanteau of "Europe" and "Africa") refers to the originally German idea of strategic partnership between Africa and Europe. In the decades before World War II, German supporters of European integration advocated a merger of African colonies as a first step towards a federal Europe.

As a genuine political project, it played a crucial role in the early development of the European Union but was largely forgotten afterwards. In the context of a renewed EU Strategy for Africa, and controversies about a Euromediterranean Partnership, the term has gone through a revival of sorts in recent years.

== Overview ==
The term had already been coined by the nineteenth century when most Africa was becoming an integrated part of European empires. It was a theory espoused by some economic policy technocrats such as the Atlantropa vision in the 1920s and the 1930s (compare the recently failed Desertec project). It then aimed to integrate African colonies providing raw materials with Europe. Erich Obst was one of the propagators during World War II.

The 1920s saw Richard von Coudenhove-Kalergi founding the first popular movement for a united Europe. His Paneuropean Union saw a Eurafrican alliance using the European colonies as a "dowry" as important base of Europe's ability to found a third pillar against the Americas and Asia. Coudenhove-Kalergis' belief had racial undertones as he claimed that Eurafrika would combine European high culture and African "primitive" vitalism to benefit both continents.

Luiza Bialasiewicz refers to Karl Haushofer's vision of an "Eurafrican" pan-region as base of the vision of Eurafrica as the most central third of the world.

The partnership discourse grew from a mere political and economic exchange to an enhanced relevance attached to the sphere of emotions and sexuality in the interwar period.

Eurafrica remained a remote political dream until the end of the World War II. Afterwards, it gained actual political impact as part of the driving forces towards European unity. Given its geographical and legal positioning, the former French territory Algeria was, in the 1950s, the focal point of the French vision of Eurafrique.

Léopold Sédar Senghor's concept of Eurafrique was closely connected with négritude, which put African cultural achievements, including the Sub-Saharan region, on the same level as European ones and saw them as part of the same cultural continuum. Senghors Élégie pour la Reine de Saba, published in his Élégies majeures in 1976 uses the Queen of Sheba legend as a love poem and a political message. Senghor's use of africanité and négritude involved in including Arab-Berber Africa.

The Revolutions of 1989 in the Eastern Bloc led to unforeseen changes and also overtook - albeit temporarily - the traditional interest in closer European-African co-operation. Against the basic foundation narrative, the large European expansion in recent decades had been eastbound and not cross-Mediterranean.

In 2009, a German Christian Democratic think tank, the Konrad Adenauer Foundation, noting the lack of a level playing field on political and economic issues, tried to focus on the future spiritual and cultural perspectives of Eurafrica instead.

== After World War II ==
The foundation of OECD in 1948 started to integrate the colonial realm of Europe.

It is in the interest of the whole free world that the [colonial] territories, which form part of it, should endeavor to speed up and increase the production of scarce material

— OEEC 1951

The Hague Congress (1948) laid the foundation of the Council of Europe 1949. Similar as the Schuman Declaration, which named the development of Africa as a central European task, it involved as well dealings with the European colonies. However, the colonial ambitions, especially of France and its illborn French Union failed to work well with reality. France eventually failed in regaining its colonies in Asia. The lost Battle of Dien Bien Phu and the start of the Algerian War within 1954 failed to help with the French ambitions. The failure of the strongest remaining European colonial powers, Britain and France, in the Suez Crisis 1956 was a major shock.

In addition, Belgian Congo gained independence 1960. Attempts in the early 1950s to construct a “Belgo-Congolese community” along Antoine van Bilsen's proposal or based on local Catholics' idea of a Conscience Africaine, both including a gradual emancipation of the Congo, failed completely.

=== Fringe theories ===
In interwar era Britain, fascist politician Oswald Mosley suggested a Third Position approach to Eurafrica. He founded the Union Movement, calling for the integration of Europe into a single entity on base of the slogan "Europe a Nation". As part of this he saw a need for a merger of Europe with Africa as a source of minerals, agricultural produce and new lands for European settlement. Mosley's conception of Eurafrica included upholding apartheid in South Africa, but also cooperation with Africans in central and northern Africa.

Similarly, Eurabia, a political neologism coined by writer Bat Ye'Or in the early 2000s claims a conspiracy of Europe, led by France and Arab powers to Islamise and Arabise Europe, thereby weakening its existing culture and undermining an alleged previous alignment with the U.S. and Israel.

=== Role of French Eurafrique in the 1950s and 60s ===
Postwar France continued in trying to use the process of European Unification as base of its colonial influences and managed to streamline early European development policy according to its colonial goals.

Until the 1960s, the French governments failed to grasp decolonization and provide a working strategy on it. Algeria was technically no French colony as it consisted of three French Departments with about a million inhabitants of European descent, the later pieds-noirs. The French tried to keep Algeria in their Eurafrican space and suggested in 1958 large infrastructure investments ('Constantine Plan') to maintain Algeria economically within their realm. France was well aware that the Algerian Departments were not viable under the conditions of the Common Market and gained some exemption clauses in the Treaty of Rome. European integration put France under pressure, as it had guaranteed various commitments to Algeria in the Evian Accords but had to reduce protectionism and trade barriers according at the same time.

=== After decolonization ===
Eurafrica subsequently played an important role in forging the European union and associated treaties, as at the Yaoundé Conventions in 1958 and later.

The Treaty of Rome from 1957 was an important milestone, as France (and Belgium) were now willing to enter a stronger European market based on the condition of association of and the provision of European funds for the remaining colonial realm. Germany, the Netherlands and Luxemburg were rather sceptical. Western Germany however traded an improvement of its own political standing - after tough negotiations between Adenauer and de Gaulle - with the French colonial attempts and agreed to provide substantially to the European Development Fund.

== Role in trade agreements and global reach ==
Eurafrica still has an influence on Europe's postcolonial role and identity, as the future of European-African relations is still being framed as a "strategic partnership" in relation to other world regions as China. Eurafrica also continues to have a significant impact on Europe and European trade. Eurafrica affects European trade and trade with other countries as well.

With regard to trade agreements and development aid, the Yaoundé-Convention has since been superseded by the Lomé Convention (1975) and the Cotonou Agreement 2000, respectively. The Lomé Conventions (Lomé I-IV) were designed as a new framework of cooperation between the then European Community (EC) and developing ACP countries, particularly former British, Dutch, Belgian and French colonies. They provided for most ACP agricultural and mineral exports to enter Europe free of duty, and some preferential access, based on a quota system for products in competition with European agriculture, as sugar and beef. The Europeans committed several billions of EC money for aid and investment in the ACP countries.

The introduction of the internal market in 1992 affected ACP preferential access to European markets. Furthermore, the US government had the World Trade Organization investigate whether the Lomé IV convention had violated WTO rules. The protective measurements for small-scale banana farmers mirrored former colonial relationships, as for the United Kingdom imports from the Caribbean, France from its overseas departments of Guadeloupe and Martinique and from former colonies, Côte d'Ivoire and Cameroon; Italy from Somalia. Germany, the largest consumer, obtained all of its supplies from Latin America. Finally, the EU negotiated directly with the US through WTO to reach an agreement. The banana wars were insofar important as the WTO decided against the cross-subsidies that had benefited ACP countries for many years.

After Lomé, the Cotonou Agreement was installed. It mirrored as well some internal developments. It asks for "reciprocal" trade agreements, meaning that the EU provides duty-free access to its markets for ACP exports, but ACP countries also have to provide duty-free access to their own markets for EU exports. The Cotonou Agreement asked as well for a stronger political foundation of the ACP-EU cooperation. The Technical Centre for Agricultural and Rural Cooperation ACP-EU (CTA) operates within the framework and is to "strengthen policy and institutional capacity development and information and communication management capacities of ACP agricultural and rural development organisations". Not all ACP countries had to open their markets to EU products after 2008. The least developed countries, most in Africa, may continue cooperation under either the arrangements made in Lomé or the "Everything But Arms" regulation.

== Mediterranean Union versus Eastern enlargement ==
The actual process of expanding the European Union began with the Inner Six, who founded the European Coal and Steel Community in 1952. Since then, the EU's membership has grown to twenty-seven, with the latest member state being Croatia, which joined in July 2013, the most recent territorial enlargement of the EU was the incorporation of French overseas department Mayotte in 2014. The most notable territorial reductions of the EU, and its predecessors, were the exit of Algeria in 1962, the exit of Greenland in 1982, and Brexit in 2020.

The Euromediterranean Partnership, also known as the Barcelona Process, was created in 1995 as part of the Spanish presidency of the Council of the EU, and culminated in attempts to align relationships with North African and Middle Eastern neighbours: the global Mediterranean policy (1972–1992) and the renovated Mediterranean policy (1992–1995). However the Future enlargement of the European Union is still eastbound, as expressed in the Eastern Partnership.

Nicolas Sarkozy attempted to resurrect the Eurafrica idea during the French presidential election campaign in 2007. Sarkozy initially tried to model a Union for the Mediterranean similar to the European Union with a shared judicial area and common institutions.

He claimed

While Europe’s future is in the South, Africa’s is in the North. ... I call on all those who can do so to join the Mediterranean Union because it will be the linchpin of Eurafrica, the great dream capable of enthusing the world

Sarkozy's approach was interpreted as somewhat patronising, and his grand strategy ultimately failed, due to a lack of interest from the various participants who were required. The attempt soon was downgraded into a relaunch of the Barcelona Process, and the plan to create an autonomous Mediterranean Union was dropped.

== See also ==
- Françafrique
- Greater Europe
- Commonwealth of Nations
- Lomé Convention
- Cotonou Agreement
- Eurosphere
