= Elena Korosteleva =

Belarusian political scientist

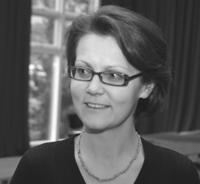
- Born: 24 January 1972 (age 54); Minsk, Byelorussian SSR, Soviet Union
- Education: Belarusian State University; University of Manchester; University of Bath
- Occupation: Academic
- Years active: 1995–present
- Website: warwick.ac.uk/fac/arts/schoolforcross-facultystudies/igsd/about/people/ekorosteleva

Elena Korosteleva (Belarusian: Алена Карасцялева, romanized: Alyena Karastsyalyeva; born 24 January 1972) is an academic researcher and principal investigator focusing on governance, democratisation, complexity and resilience. She is Professor of Politics and Global Sustainable Development and Director of the Institute for Global Sustainable Development at the University of Warwick and is visiting professor at the Oxford Belarus Observatory at the Oxford University.

She is an expert on the politics of Belarus, Ukraine and Moldova; as well as academic expert on the European External Action Service (EEAS), European Neighbourhood Policy (ENP) and Eastern Partnership (EaP). She is fellow of the European Institute for International Law and International Relations. Korosteleva holds doctoral degrees from the University of Bath and the Belarusian State University Minsk and was previously British Academy postdoctoral research fellow at Glasgow University. Korosteleva was Jean Monnet Chair and Professor of International Politics in the School of Politics and International Relations, University of Kent and Director (Professional Studies) of the Global Europe Centre (GEC).

In addition, Korosteleva is a member of the International Advisory Board for GLOBSEC and European Strategy Council; Professorial Fellow of the Dahrendorf Forum at the LSE and is visiting professor at the College of Europe and was Visiting Fellow of the Belarusian State University, Minsk, until her resignation of this position after the 2020 Belarus election. Previously Korosteleva was Jean Monnet Chair and Director of the Centre for European Studies (CES), at Aberystwyth University. Korosteleva joined the Editorial Board of the newly launched Cambridge Journal of Eurasian Studies.

== Research interests ==
Korosteleva's work centres around the critical analysis of the European Union's (EU) European External Action Service (EEAS), European Neighbourhood Policy (ENP), European Neighbourhood and Partnership Initiative (ENPI) and Eastern Partnership (EaP) in relation to the Post-Soviet states of Russia, Ukraine, Belarus and Moldova. She is an expert in the politics of Belarus, third wave democratisation in Eastern Europe and charismatic political leadership. She publishes extensively in monographs, academic journals, book chapters and government briefing and policy papers. Korosteleva has acted as an expert for the Parliament of the United Kingdom and European Commission.

== Global Challenges Research Fund: COMPASS ==
Korosteleva has been awarded £3,776,443.00 for the COMPASS project, funded by the Research Councils UK Global Challenges Research Fund which aims to open up communication with academics in former Soviet states of Azerbaijan, Belarus, Tajikistan and Uzbekistan by setting up hubs of excellence in research in these countries.

She and her research partner, Siddharth Saxena from Cambridge University, say this is a research initiative to empower the target countries in research, impact governance and public policy outreach. COMPASS will enable a sea change in the UK's strategic relationship with the region.

The University of Kent and their Co-Investigators, Cambridge Central Asia Forum (Jesus College) and the Centre for Development Studies, University of Cambridge, have years of experience in collaborating with the region in supporting their research.

== Erasmus+ ==
Korosteleva, working with colleagues from the Belarusian State University and University of Kent is project lead for an Erasmus+ International Credit Mobility project to support bilateral student and staff mobility between the Belarusian State University and Kent and the first large-scale mobility and co-operation programme between Higher Education Institutions in the UK and Belarus.

== Building Research Excellence in Russian and East European Studies at the Universities of Tartu, Uppsala and Kent ==
Korosteleva, working with Piret Ehin of the Centre for EU-Russia Studies (CEURUS) at the University of Tartu, Estonia, and Professor Stefan Hedlund of the Centre for Russian and Eurasian Studies, Uppsala University, received funding from the European Commission for a three-year (2016-2019), €1million, EU Horizon 2020 twinning project entitled UPTAKE (UPpsala, TArtu, KEnt).

The project was designed to increase research productivity and excellence and promote international visibility and integration of the three universities in the field of Russian and East European Studies by creating a dynamic, comprehensive, open and sustainable framework for co-operation and transfer of knowledge. Specifically, the project included the launch of a new academic conference series, the organisation of four international summer and winter schools, extensive inter-institutional mobility, joint supervision of doctoral students and postdoctoral fellows, coordinated promotion of research outputs, joint conceptualisation and launch of new collaborative research projects, as well as extensive dissemination and communication measures.

== Europe in the world: Towards a more effective EU foreign and security strategy ==
Korosteleva and her team of doctoral students' evidence, submitted to the United Kingdom House of Lords European Union Committee, was cited in the 2016 report Europe in the world: Towards a more effective EU foreign and security strategy. The committee noted:

46. It became clear in the course of our inquiry into EU-Russia relations that the current confrontation is driven both by Russian domestic and political considerations and the geopolitical ambitions of the current Russian administration. Even a settlement in Ukraine will not guarantee that the Union will be able return to harmonious relations with Russia. Therefore, the future of EU-Russia relations, the security of neighbours such as Ukraine, Georgia and Moldova, as well as the long-term alignment of countries such as Azerbaijan and Armenia—neither of which, in the words of Professor Elena Korosteleva, Mr Igor Merheim-Eyre, Ms Eske Van Gils and Ms Irena Mnatsakanyan, Global Europe Centre, University of Kent, “enjoys very close relations with the EU”—remain in the balance.

== Widening the European dialogue in Moldova ==
Korosteleva was commissioned by the Slovak Atlantic Commission as principal investigator to undertake a nationwide representative survey in Moldova between 19 October and 7 November 2013 aimed at measuring public knowledge, perceptions and preferences in relation to the EU and its policies.

== Belarus and Eastern Partnership: National and European values ==
Korosteleva was commissioned by the Office for Democratic Belarus as principal investigator to undertake a nationwide representative survey in Belarus between 20 May and 4 June 2013 focusing on the country's relations with the EU and the (Eurasian) Customs Union (ECU); as well as public perceptions, values, and attitudes towards the afore-mentioned entities.

== European External Action Service (EEAS) ==
Korosteleva's evidence, submitted to the United Kingdom House of Lords European Union Committee was cited in the report on the European External Action Service. The committee wrote:

52. Professor Elena Korosteleva (University of Kent) has studied Belarus, Ukraine and Moldova, three of the Eastern Partnership countries. She had observed that the EEAS could be beneficial both as a global force and for overcoming divisions in government and institutions, but thought that a number of management problems needed to be addressed to achieve coherence and continuity in competences at the lower levels of the EEAS, especially in delegations. She also advocated a clearer delineation of roles and responsibilities in relation to Member States and efforts to engage with host countries. Structural reform was needed to replace divided structures, loyalties and competences by "collective service to the common good.

== European Neighbourhood Policy Research and Eastern Partnership Initiative Research (ENP/EaP Research) ==
Korosteleva's primary research focus is on the conceptual and methodological limitations of the Eastern Partnership initiative, especially concerning the notion of partnership, as the focal point of the initiative. Through a major ESRC research project she examines the EU's relations with Belarus, Ukraine, Moldova in contrast to the international relations approach adopted by Russia. She notes that the top-down EU-centric governance approach (based on EU rule and norm transfer) clashes with the notion of partnership, which is based on reciprocal exchange and co-operation on issues of mutual interest.

Her 2012 work The European Union and its Eastern Neighbours: Towards a more ambitious partnership? (2012) explores the EU's relations with its eastern neighbours. Based on the extensive original research – including surveys, focus-groups, a study of school essays and in-depth interviews with key people in Belarus, Ukraine, Moldova, Russia and in Brussels – it assesses why the EU's initiatives have received limited legitimacy in the neighbourhood has been so poorly received.

Korosteleva's second major publication from this research is an edited volume entitled Eastern Partnership: A New Opportunity for the Neighbours? (2011). This book, written in partnership with in-country experts, offers a collective assessment of the development and impact of the European Neighbourhood Policy and the Eastern Partnership Initiative on its eastern neighbours – Belarus, Ukraine and Moldova in particular, with Russia's added perspective.

== 'The Quality of Democracy' ==
Korosteleva working with Derek Hutcheson (eds) explore how the countries of the former Eastern Bloc and Soviet Union have exhibited remarkable diversity in their post-communist regime paths in The Quality of Democracy in Post-Communist Europe (2005). They argue that whereas some states have become demonstrably more democratic and have moved in the space of fifteen years from the periphery to the centre of European politics, in others the political and economic climates seem hardly to be better, and their societies no more free, than in the final years of the Cold War. Assessing progress towards democracy in the former Eastern Bloc – or the lack of it – requires a qualitative examination of post-communist polities. This research brings together a number of perspectives, both macro and micro-analytical, on the 'quality' of democracy in post-communist Europe.

== Belarusian politics ==
Korosteleva with Colin Lawson and Rosalind Marsh (eds) argue in Contemporary Belarus between Democracy and Dictatorship (2003) that Belarus is unique among the states of the former Soviet bloc, in that after a decade of transition', the country remains stalled' and backward-oriented.

Korosteleva with Stephen White and John Lowenhardt (eds) continue the analysis of Belarusian politics in Post Communist Belarus (2005). They wrote that Belarus was one of the least studied European states to emerge from the collapse of the Soviet Union in 1991. In fact, few Western specialists paid much attention to its affairs during the Soviet era. and psychological as much as they are political, economic, and social.

== Teaching recognition ==
Korosteleva is a Fellow of the Higher Education Academy (FHEA) and was awarded the Higher Education Academy BISA-CSAP Teaching Award for Excellence in Teaching International Studies in 2009;.

== Pedagogic research ==
Korosteleva has published on pedagogical enhancement of teaching and learning in higher education using threshold knowledge.

Korosteleva has undertaken research, funded by the Higher Education Academy Subject Centre for Sociology, Anthropology and Politics (C-SAP) on emergent learning.

== Selected publications ==
=== Books ===
- Korosteleva, E.A, (2012), The European Union and its Eastern Neighbours: Towards a more ambitious partnership? London: BASEES/Routledge Series on Russian and East European Studies, ISBN 0-415-61261-6
- Korosteleva, E.A, (1997), Intellektual v socio-kul’turnom kontekste sovremennogo obschestva: dialektika proshlogo i budushchego [The Intellectual in a socio-cultural context of the modern society: the dialectics of the past and the future], ISBN 985-6390-07-9 Minsk: VEDY,(soft cover)

=== Monographs ===
- Korosteleva, E., Paikin, Z. and Paduano, S., (2019), ‘Five Years After Maidan: Towards a Greater EUrasia?. LSE IDEAS’.
- Korosteleva, E., (2016), The EU and Belarus: seizing the opportunity? The EU and Belarus: seizing the opportunity Swedish Institute for European Policy Studies, November 2016.

=== Single edited books ===
- Korosteleva E.A, (Ed.), (2011), Eastern Partnership: A New Opportunity for the Neighbours?, London: Routledge, ISBN 0-415-67607-X
- Korosteleva E.A, (Ed.), (2011), Vostochnoe Partnerstvo: problemy i perspektivy [Eastern Partnership: problems and perspectives], Minsk: Belarusian State University, ISBN 978-985-491-088-8

=== Jointly edited books ===
- Алена Карасцялёва, Ірына Пятрова, Настасся Кудленка,(2024), “Беларусь у XXI стагоддзі: паміж дыктатурай і дэмакратыяй”, London, Skaryna Press, ISBN 978-1-9156-0139-1
- (with) Kudlenko, A. and, Petrova, I. (Eds), (2023), "Belarus in the Twenty-First Century: Between Dictatorship and Democracy", London, Routledge, ISBN 978-1-0323-1805-9
- (with) Flockhart, T. (Eds.), (2020), Resilience in EU and International Institutions: Redefining Local Ownership in a New Global Governance Agenda, London: Routledge, ISBN 978-0-3675-4391-4
- (with) Merheim-Eyre, I. and van Gils, E.(Eds.), (2018), The Politics’ and ‘The Political’ of the Eastern Partnership Initiative: Reshaping the Agenda, London: Routledge, ISBN 978-0-8153-5898-5
- (with) Natorski, M. and Simao, L.(Eds.), (2014), EU Policies in the Eastern Neighbourhood: the practices perspective, London: Routledge, ISBN 0415720575
- (with) Hutcheson, D. (Eds.), (2006), The Quality of Democracy in Post-Communist Europe, London: Routledge, ISBN 0-415-34807-2
- (with) White, S. and Löwenhardt, J. (Eds.), (2005), Postcommunist Belarus, N.Y. & Oxford: Rowman and Littlefield, ISBN 0-7425-3555-X
- (with) Marsh, R and Lawson, C. (Eds.), (2003), Contemporary Belarus: Between Democracy and Dictatorship, London: RoutledgeCurzon, ISBN 0-7007-1613-0

=== Chapters ===
- "The Challenges of a Changing Eastern Neighbourhood, in Schumacher, T., Marchetti, A. and Demmelhuber, T,, (eds.), Routledge Handbook on the European Neighbourhood Policy. London: Routledge, (London: Routledge, 2017)
- "EU and Russia: Prospects for Cohabitation in the Contested Region, in Lane, D and Samokhvalov, V., (eds.), The Eurasian Project and Europe: Regional Discontinuities and Geopolitics, (London: Palgrave, 2015)
- "The EU and its Eastern Neighbours: why ‘othering’ matters", in Nicolaidis, K. and B. Sebe (eds.), Echoes of Empire: Echoes of Empire: Memory, Identity and the Legacy of Imperialism (London: Tauris, 2015)
- "Belarus: Neither with the EU nor the ECU?", in Dutkiewicz, P., Sakwa, R. et al. (eds.) Eurasia – From Contested Concept to Emerging Integration (London: Routledge, 2014)
- "Questioning Democracy Promotion: Belarus’ Response to the Coloured Revolutions", in Finkel, E. and Brudny, Y. (eds.) Coloured Revolutions and Authoritarian Reactions (Yale University Press, 2014)
- "Belarus : political party system", in Sagar, D (ed.) Political Parties of the World (London : Harper Publishers, 2008), 7th edition
- "Party system development in Belarus 1988–2001: Myths and Realities", in Kulik, A. and Pshizova, S (eds.) Political Parties in Post-Soviet Space: Russia, Belarus, Ukraine, Moldova, and the Baltics (London : Praeger Publishers, 2005), pp. 59–75. ISBN 0-275-97344-1
- (with Rontoyanni, C.) "Belarus: an authoritarian exception from the model of post-communist democratic transition?", in Flockhart, T.(ed.) Socializing Democratic Norms: The Role of International Organisations for the Construction of Europe (London: Palgrave, 2005), pp. 202–232. ISBN 1-4039-4521-7
- "Why Belarus is unique: explaining institutional and electoral allegiances", in Elo, K and Ruutu, K. (eds.) Russia and the CIS – Janus-faced Democracies (Helsinki : Kikimora Publications, 2005), pp. 89–107. ISBN 952-10-2586-7
- "Belarus : political party system", in Szajkowski, B (ed.) Political Parties of the World (London : Harper Publishers, 2004), 6th edition, pp. 52–56. ISBN 0-9543811-4-9
- "Political leadership and public support in Belarus : Forward to the past?", in Lewis, A. (ed.) The EU and Belarus: Between Moscow and Brussels (London: Kogan Page, 2002), pp. 51–71 ISBN 1-903403-02-2
- "Perspectives on democratic party development in Belarus ", in Lewis, P. (ed.) Party Development and Democratic Change in Post-Communist Europe – the First Decade (London: Frank Cass, 2001), pp. 141–152 ISBN 0-7146-5155-9
