= Greater Europe =

Idea of an extended Europe

Map of the European Union's regional initiatives: Members of the European Union Members of the European Free Trade Association Microstates with which the EU has Special Agreements Countries which are part of the EU's current Enlargement Agenda Members of the EU Eastern Partnership Countries which are both members of the UfM and are part of the European Neighbourhood Policy Country which is only part of the Union for the Mediterranean EU–UK Trade and Cooperation Agreement

Greater Europe refers to the idea of an extended Europe that generally implies a Europe transcending traditional geographic boundaries to include trans-Eurasian countries, or countries in close proximity to Continental Europe with strong political, economic, or cultural links to Europe.

== Definitions ==
Lisbon to Vladivostok with all European and CIS nations in between: Countries which are part of the Council of Europe Countries which are part of the Commonwealth of Independent States

The concept of Greater Europe may specifically deal with the current enlargement agenda or the potential future enlargement of the European Union.

It may also reference a more "re-unified" Europe after the fall of the Iron Curtain, the intensification of European integration, the potential establishment of a Federal Europe, or to the concept of the Eurosphere and of Europe's increasing global influence.

Other definitions of Greater Europe may include all European states and CIS countries or all European states and the post-Soviet states of the Eurasian Economic Union; theoretically stretching from Lisbon to Vladivostok.

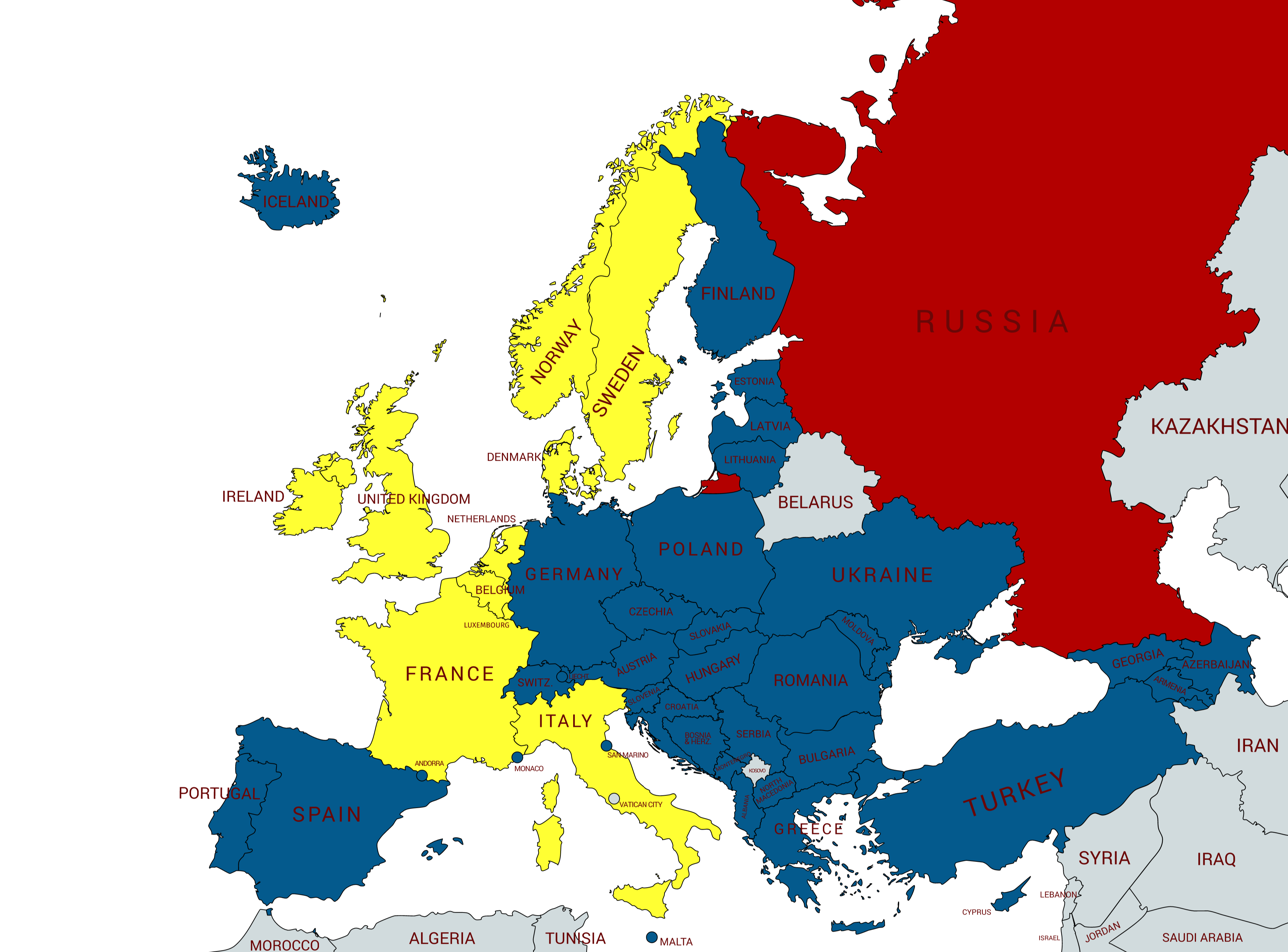
Council of Europe member states as of 16 March 2022: Founder states Later members Former members

== Support ==
A clickable Euler diagram showing the relationships between various European regional organisations

Several organizations exist promoting discussion and debate surrounding Greater Europe, among them the Institute for a Greater Europe and the Youth Association for a Greater Europe. There are also several organizations which promote increased dialogue and greater economic and political integration among states within Greater Europe, including:

- Assembly of European Regions
- Commonwealth of Independent States
- Community for Democracy and Rights of Nations
- Council of Europe
- Eastern Partnership
- Euro-Mediterranean Parliamentary Assembly
- Euronest Parliamentary Assembly
- European Bank for Reconstruction and Development
- European Higher Education Area
- European Olympic Committees
- European Political Community
- Mediterranean Union
- Organization for Security and Co-operation in Europe
- Organization of the Black Sea Economic Cooperation
- TRACECA

== Economic integration in greater Europe ==
=== Lisbon Vladivostok initiative ===
The vision of a common economic space from Lisbon to Vladivostok has been debated since the 1950s. The Lisbon Vladivostok Initiative believes that this vision can be turned into reality, and sees a multi-level partnership between the European Union (EU) and the Eurasian Economic Union (EAEU) as the core aspect of a common economic space. Cooperation between the EU and EAEU could bring enormous benefits for trade and business in Europe and Eurasia. The Initiative was founded in 2015 and is driven by businesses, business associations, and think tanks from member countries of the EU and EAEU. Among the founding members are the German-Russian Forum, the German Chamber of Commerce, and the German Eastern Business Association, as well as international corporations such as Siemens, Bosch, Severstal and others. Today, the Initiative counts on more than 100 members from 12 countries from the EU and EAEU. It sees itself as an open circle involving all countries from Lisbon to Vladivostok.

==== Goals of the Lisbon Vladivostok initiative ====
The markets of the EU and the EAEU cover more than 630 million inhabitants. Despite different levels of development of the two unions, by creating lasting networks between officials, maintaining continual dialogue, and through the establishment of a common economic area in the countries of the EU and the EAEU, it may be possible to combat European and Eurasian issues of the future more effectively.

== See also ==
- Continentalism
  - Pan-Africanism
  - Pan-Asianism, a similar movement in Asia
- EMEA – Geographical region for global institutional and marketing planning
- Eurafrica
- Eurasia
- Eurosphere
- European integration
- Foreign relations of the European Union
- Politics of Europe
- Pro-Europeanism
- Regions of Europe
