= Sphere of influence =

Political concept

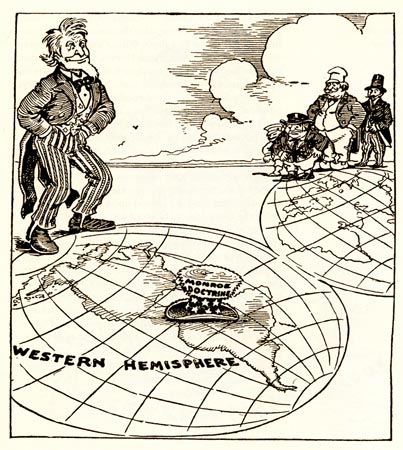
A 1912 newspaper cartoon highlighting the United States's influence in Latin America following the Monroe Doctrine

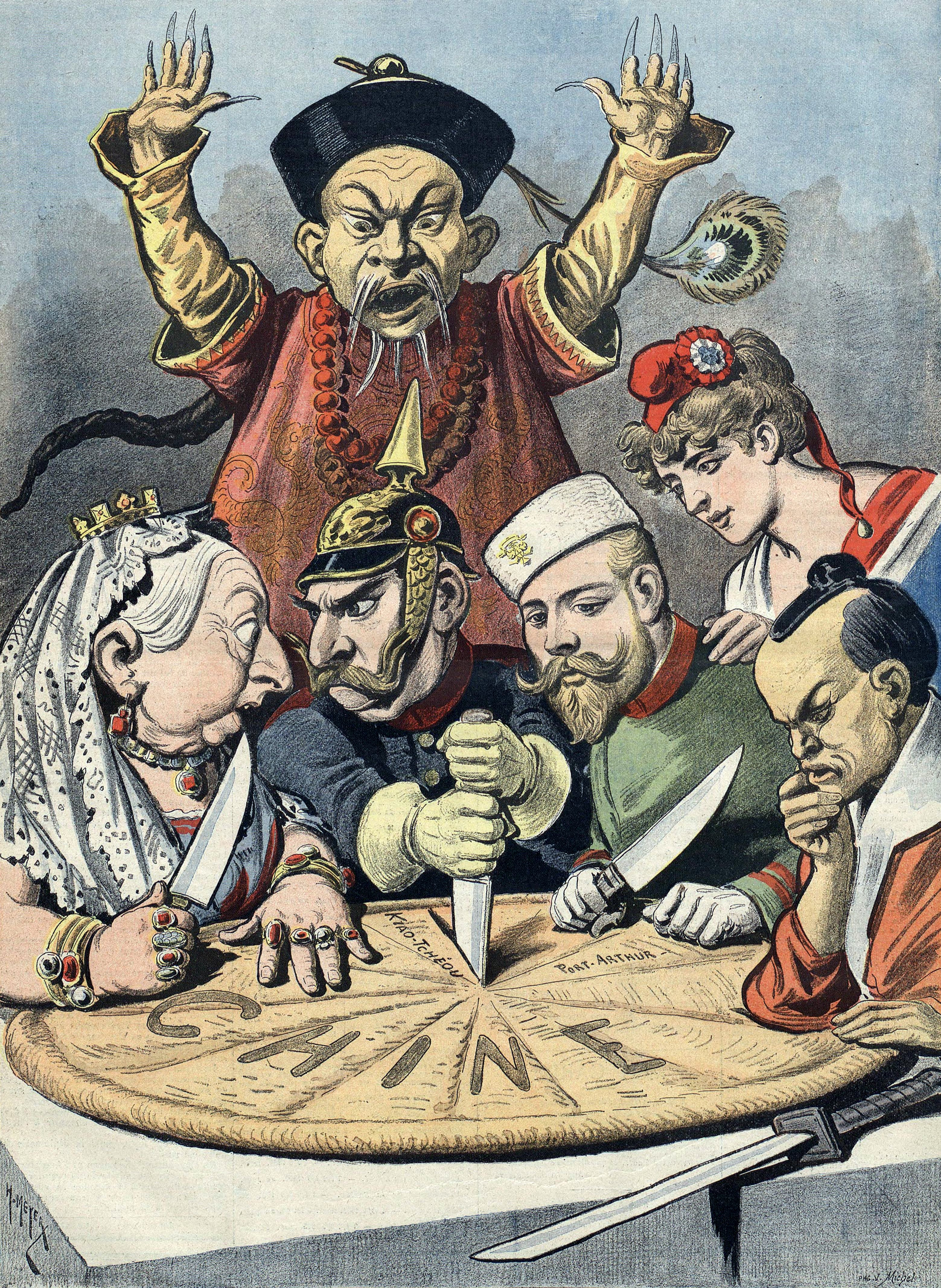
A French political cartoon in 1898, China – the cake of Kings and Emperors, showing Queen Victoria of the United Kingdom, Kaiser Wilhelm II of Germany, Tsar Nicholas II of Russia, Marianne of France, and Japanese Emperor Meiji dividing China ruled by Emperor Guangxu. "Kiao-Tchéou" and "Port-Arthur," written on slices of the cake, represent those locations in China; a stereotyped mandarin reacts with horror in the background.

In the field of international relations, a sphere of influence (SOI) is a spatial/geographic region, or set of polities or nations, over which a leader nation state or other geopolitically powerful organisation has a level of cultural, economic, military, or political influence or exclusivity.

While there may be a formal alliance or other treaty obligations between the influenced and influencer, such formal arrangements are not necessary for a sphere to exist. Influence can be had through the use of hard as well as soft power. Similarly, a formal alliance does not necessarily mean that one country lies within another's sphere of influence. Historically, strong or strict exclusivities within spheres of influence, has often led to or been associated with higher levels of global conflict and tension between such spheres. Inter-sphere trade, interdependence and communication, on the other hand, have spawned periods of relative peace – as have periods where spheres of influence have been more weakly enforced and international associations more voluntary.

In extreme cases, a country or community within the "sphere of influence" of another, more powerful nation state, may become a client state or a functional subsidiary of that state -- serving in effect as a satellite state or de facto colony. This was the case, in the decades following the end of World War II, with the Soviet Union (through dominant power Russia) and smaller members of the Eastern Bloc (eg, the Baltic states; such power relations arguably exist in Belarus today). The system of spheres of influence, under which regions are divided amongst powerful nations, who then influence or intervene in the affairs of small nations in their region, continues to the present. Geopolitical power relations are often analyzed using notions of regional or global superpowers, great powers, and/or middle powers.

Sometimes different portions of a single country can fall into different spheres of influence, or a nation may fall into different spheres of influence depending on the factor being influenced (eg, trade, or cultural, influence). In the 19th century, the buffer states of Iran and Thailand, lying between the empires of Britain, France, and Russia, were divided between the spheres of influence of those three international powers. Likewise, after World War II, Nazi Germany was divided into four occupation zones, three of which later consolidated into West Germany and the remaining one became East Germany, the former a member of NATO and the latter a member of the Warsaw Pact.

== Historical remnants ==
Before modern international relations were established in Europe, many powerful states had subordinate tributary states, in which the less powerful states or kingdoms submit to the payment of tribute in order to maintain a degree of independence.

As European nation-states explored and sought to claim large parts of Africa, Asia, and the Pacific, often under the aegis of international law, a language of "colonies", "protectorates", "spheres of influence", and "empires" emerged. The international relations thus characterized bespoke usefructory relations of military and political domination. At the same time, the exploration of the globe, the "spread of civilisation", the conveyance of enlightenment and western values, and the promotion (over time) of proto-democratic models of government, were seen as part of the "gift" of such empires to territories and peoples unfamiliar with Europe, its people and ideas.

Many areas of the world are still joined to a "mother country", a European nation, by common heritage, demography, and cultural influence inherited while such powers had clearer spheres of influence, even if such nations no longer exert any real political control over their former colonies. Examples include the Anglosphere, Arab world, Batavosphere, Persosphere, Eurosphere, Francophonie, Françafrique, Germanosphere, Indosphere, Hispanidad, Latin Europe/Latin America, Lusophonie, Turkosphere, Sinosphere, Slavisphere, Malay world, post-Soviet states, and many others.

== History ==
=== Early United States (1820s) ===
Alexander Hamilton, first U.S. Secretary of the Treasury, aimed for the United States to establish a sphere of influence in North America. Hamilton, writing in the Federalist Papers, harboured ambitions for the US to rise to world power-status, and over time gain sufficient strength to aver or even expel European powers from the Americas. The US, under this thinking, would exercise regional dominance throughout the territory and seas of North America, and amongst all nations extant in such geographic space; this was ambitious, as most of the New World was still governed through colonial arrangements by powerful European nations (empires) at the time.

An elaboration of this doctrine, later dubbed the 'Monroe Doctrine', was formalized under President James Monroe (in office for two terms from 1817–1825), who asserted that the New World was to be established as part of the American sphere of influence, and concomitantly be removed from the encroachment of European power. As the US emerged as a world power, few nations dared to trespass on this sphere (a notable exception occurred with the Soviet Union and the Cuban Missile Crisis).

Even in 2018, US Secretary of State Rex Tillerson referenced to the Monroe Doctrine as he touted the US as the region's preferred trade partner over other nations with other, more distant spheres of geographic influence (such as China).

=== New Imperialism era (late 1800s – early 1900s) ===
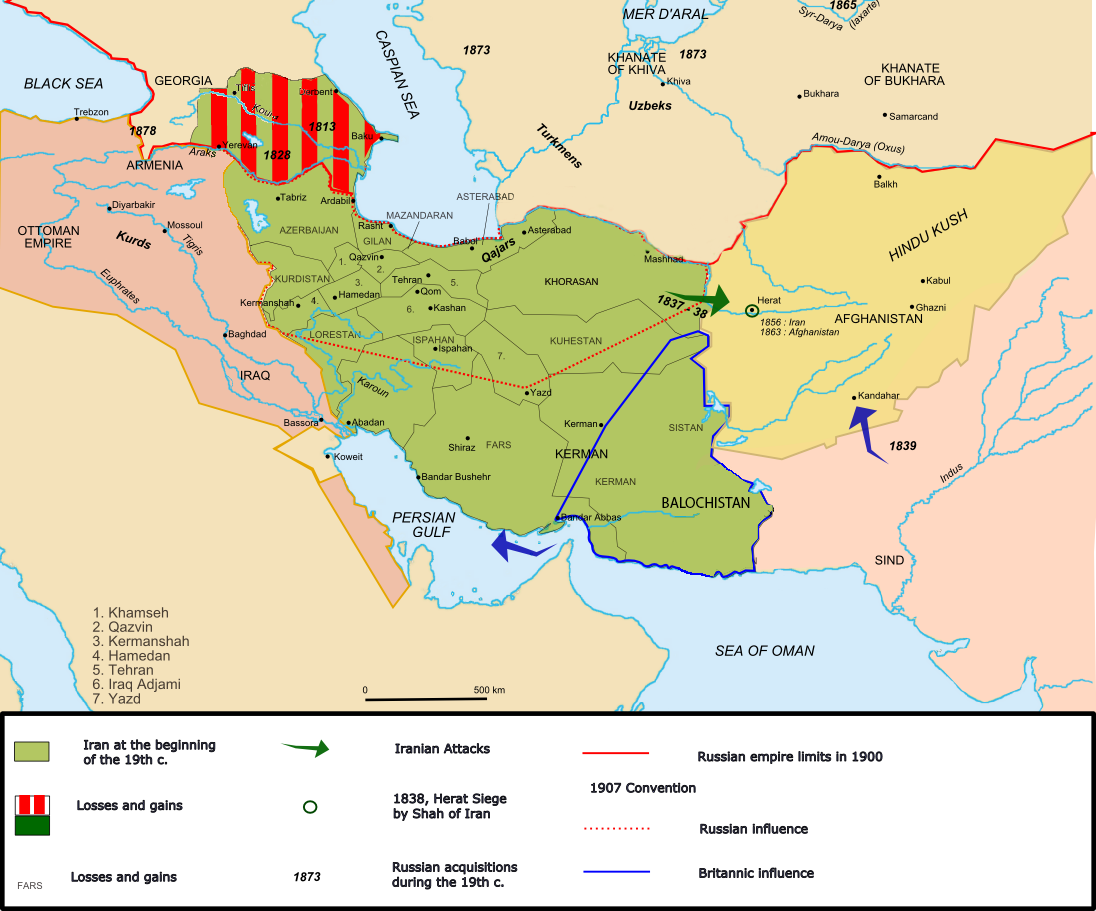
Delimitation of British and Russian influence in Iran

For Siam (Thailand), Britain and France signed an agreement in 1904 whereby the British recognised a French sphere of influence to the east of the River Menam's (Chao Phraya River) basin; in turn, the French recognised British influence over the territory to the west of the Menam basin and west of the Gulf of Thailand. Both parties disclaimed any idea of annexing Siamese territory.

In the Anglo-Russian Convention of 1907, Britain and Russia divided Persia (Iran) into spheres of influence, with the Russians gaining recognition for influence over most of northern Iran, and Britain establishing a zone in the southeast.

==== China ====
In China, during the mid 19th and 20th centuries (known in China as the "century of humiliation"), Great Britain, France, Germany, Russia, and Japan held special powers over large swaths of Chinese territory based on securing "nonalienation commitments" for their "spheres of interest"; only the United States was unable to participate due to their involvement in the Spanish–American War. These spheres of influence were acquired by forcing the Qing government to sign "unequal treaties" and long-term leases.

In early 1895, the French laid claim to a sphere in Southwest China. By December 1897, German Kaiser Wilhelm II declared his intent to seize territory in China, precipitating the scramble to demarcate zones of influence in China. The Germans acquired, in Shandong province, exclusive control over developmental loans, mining, and railway ownership, while Russia gained a sphere over all territory north of the Great Wall, in addition to the previous tax exemption for trade in Mongolia and Xinjiang, economic powers similar to Germany's over Fengtian, Jilin, and Heilongjiang provinces. France gained a sphere over Yunnan, as well as most of Guangxi and Guangdong provinces; Japan over Fujian province; and the British over the whole Yangtze River Valley (defined as all provinces adjoining the Yangtze river as well as Henan and Zhejiang provinces), parts of Guangdong and Guangxi provinces, and part of Tibet. Only Italy's request for Zhejiang province was declined by the Chinese government. These do not include the lease and concession territories where the foreign powers had full authority.

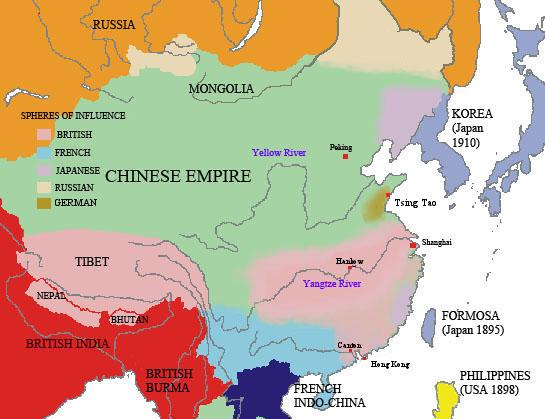
Spheres of influence in the Chinese empire in the early 20th century

The Russian government militarily occupied their zone, imposed their law and schools, seized mining and logging privileges, settled their citizens, and even established their municipal administration on several cities, the latter without Chinese consent.

The powers (and the United States) might have their own courts, post offices, commercial institutions, railroads, and gunboats in what was on paper Chinese territory. However, the foreign powers and their control in some cases could have been exaggerated; the local government persistently restricted further encroachment. The system ended after World War II.

On September 6, 1899, US Secretary of State John Hay sent notes to the major powers (France, Germany, Britain, Italy, Japan, and Russia), asking them to declare formally that they would uphold Chinese territorial and administrative integrity and would not interfere with the free use of the treaty ports within their spheres of influence in China, as the United States felt threatened by other powers' much larger spheres of influence in China and worried that it might lose access to the Chinese market should the country be officially partitioned. Although treaties made after 1900 refer to this "Open Door Policy", competition among the various powers for special concessions within China for railroad rights, mining rights, loans, foreign trade ports, and so forth, continued unabated, with the US itself contradicting the policy by agreeing to recognize the Japanese sphere in the Lansing–Ishii Agreement.

=== World War II (1939–1945) ===
==== Empire of Japan ====
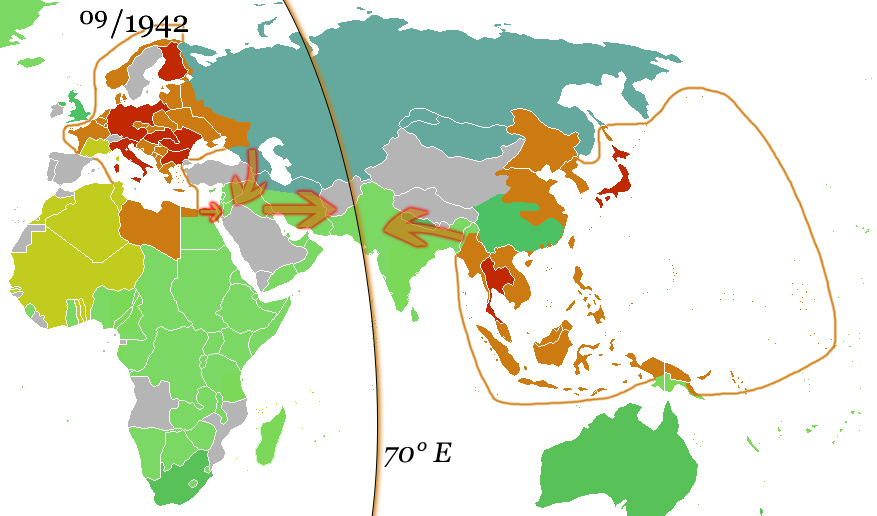
German and Japanese direct spheres of influence at their greatest extents in fall 1942

For another example, during the height of its existence in World War II, the Empire of Japan had quite a large sphere of influence. The Japanese government directly governed events in Korea, Vietnam, Taiwan, and parts of Mainland China. The "Greater East Asia Co-Prosperity Sphere" could thus be quite easily drawn on a map of the Pacific Ocean as a large "bubble" surrounding the islands of Japan and the Asian and Pacific nations it controlled.

==== Molotov–Ribbentrop Pact ====
According to a secret protocol attached to the Molotov–Ribbentrop Pact of 1939 (revealed only after Germany's defeat in 1945), Northern and Eastern Europe were divided into Nazi and Soviet spheres of influence:

- In the north, Finland, Estonia, and Latvia were assigned to the Soviet sphere.
- Poland was to be partitioned in the event of its "political rearrangement"—the areas east of the Narev, Vistula, and San Rivers going to the Soviet Union, while Germany would occupy the west.
- Lithuania, adjacent to East Prussia, would be in the German sphere of influence, although a second secret protocol agreed in September 1939 assigned Lithuania to the USSR.

Another clause of the treaty stipulated that Bessarabia, then part of Romania, would join the Moldovan ASSR and become the Moldovan SSR under the control of Moscow. The Soviet invasion of Bukovina on 28 June 1940 violated the Molotov-Ribbentrop Pact, as it went beyond the Soviet sphere of influence as agreed with the Axis. The USSR continued to deny the existence of the Pact's protocols until after the dissolution of the Soviet Union when the Russian government fully acknowledged the existence and authenticity of the secret protocols.

==== End of World War II ====
From 1941 and the German attack on the Soviet Union, the Allied Coalition operated on the unwritten assumption that the Western powers and the Soviet Union had each its own sphere of influence. The presumption of the US-British and Soviet unrestricted rights in their respective spheres began to cause difficulties as the Nazi-controlled territory shrank and the allied powers successively liberated other states.

The wartime spheres lacked a practical definition and it had never been determined if a dominant allied power was entitled to unilateral decisions only in the area of military activity, or could also force its will regarding political, social and economic future of other states. This overly informal system backfired during the late stages of the war and afterward, when it turned out that the Soviets and the Western Allies had very different ideas concerning the administration and future development of the liberated regions and of Germany itself.

=== Cold War (1947–1991) ===
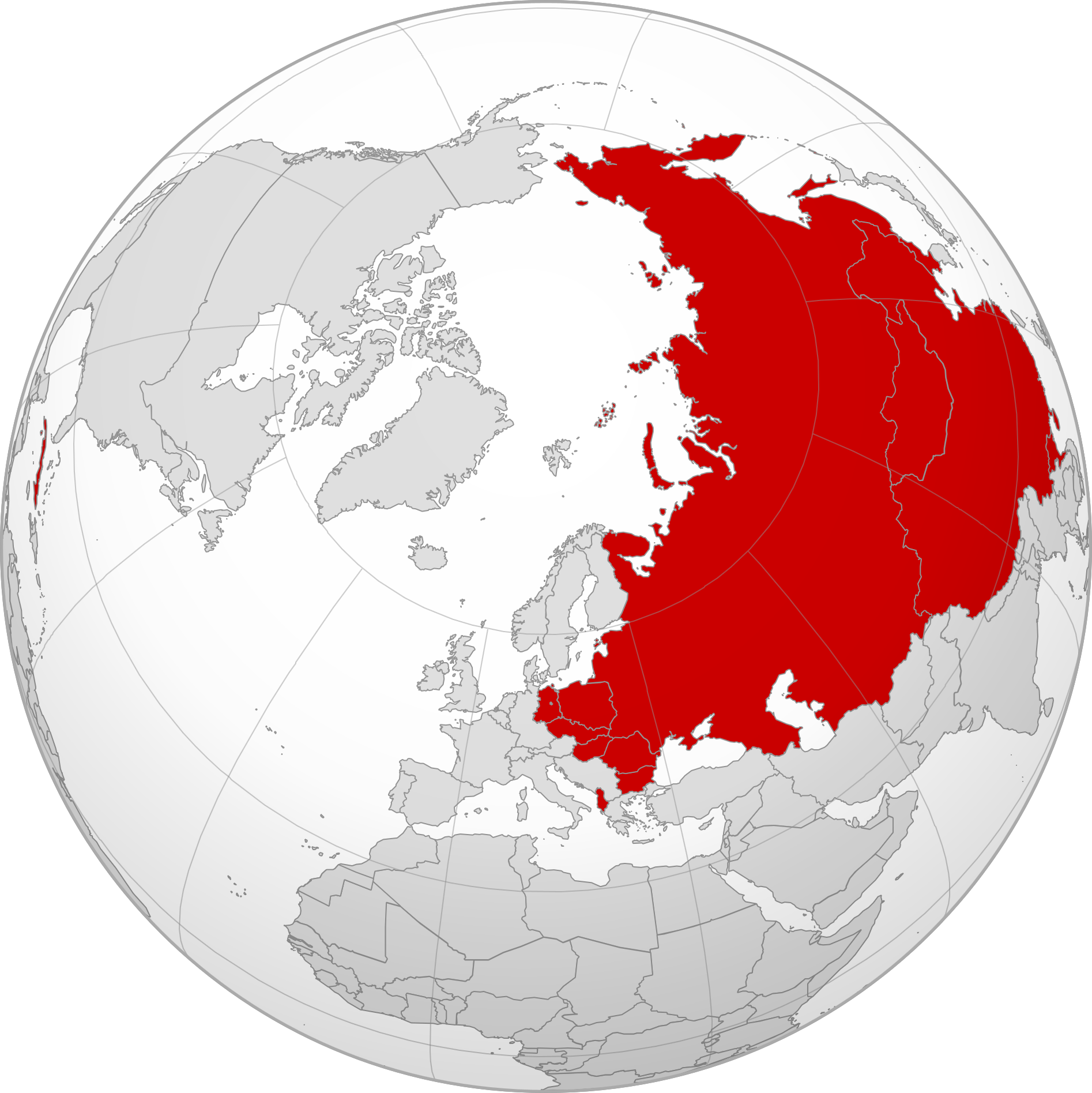
Greatest extent of Soviet influence, after the Cuban Revolution but before the Sino-Soviet split

During the Cold War, the Soviet sphere of influence was said to include: the Baltic states, Central Europe, some countries in Eastern Europe, Cuba, Laos, Vietnam, North Korea, and—until the Sino-Soviet split and Tito–Stalin split—the People's Republic of China and the People's Federal Republic of Yugoslavia, respectively, among other countries at various times. Meanwhile, United States was considered to have a sphere of influence over Western Europe, Oceania, Japan, South Vietnam, and South Korea, among other places.

However, the level of control exerted in these spheres varied and was not absolute. For instance, France and the United Kingdom were able to act independently to invade (with Israel) the Suez Canal (they were later forced to withdraw by joint US and Soviet pressure). Later, France was also able to withdraw from the military arm of the North Atlantic Treaty Organization (NATO). Cuba, as another example, often took positions that put it at odds with its Soviet ally, including momentary alliances with China, economic reorganizations, and providing support for insurgencies in Africa and the Americas without prior approval from the Soviet Union.

With the end of the Cold War, the Eastern Bloc fell apart, effectively ending the Soviet sphere of influence. Then in 1991, the Soviet Union ceased to exist, replaced by the Russian Federation and several other ex-Soviet Republics who became independent states.

=== Contemporary Russia (1990s–present) ===
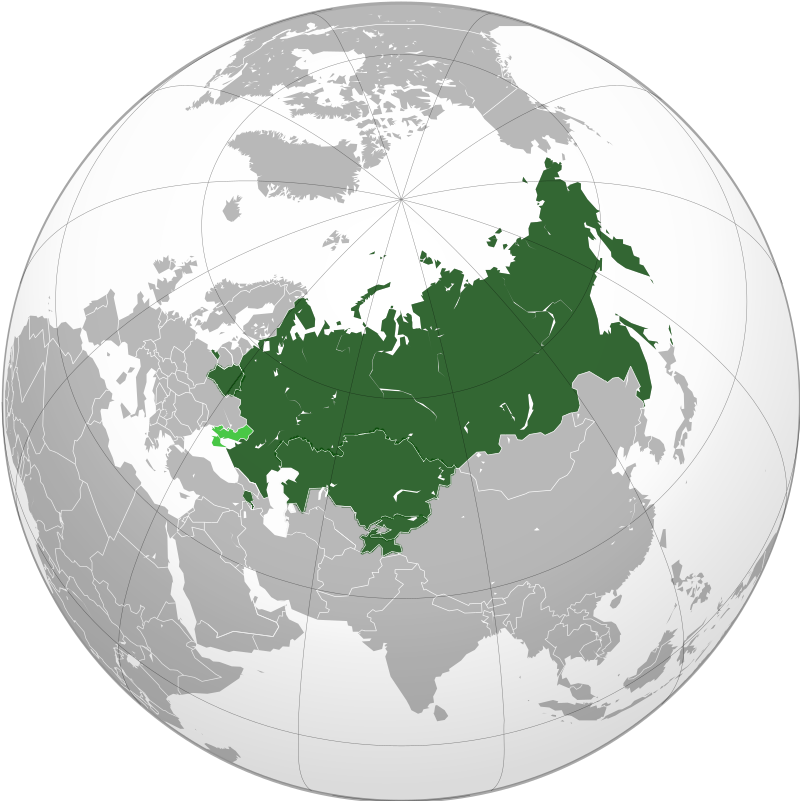
CSTO members including Russian-occupied territories of Ukraine

Following the fall of the Soviet Union, the countries of the Commonwealth of Independent States that became independent in 1991, were portrayed as part of the Russian Federation's 'sphere of influence', according to a statement by Boris Yeltsin, dated September 1994.

According to Ulrich Speck, writing for Carnegie Europe, "After the breakup of the Soviet Union, the West's focus was on Russia. Western nations implicitly treated the post-Soviet countries (besides the Baltic states) as Russia's sphere of influence."

In 1997, NATO and Russia signed the Founding Act on Mutual Relations, Cooperation and Security, stating the "aim of creating in Europe a common space of security and stability, without dividing lines or spheres of influence limiting the sovereignty of any state."

On August 31, 2008, Russian president Dmitri Medvedev stated five principles of foreign policy, including the claim of a privileged sphere of influence that comprised "the border region, but not only".

Following the 2008 Russo-Georgian War, Václav Havel and other former central and eastern European leaders signed an open letter stating that Russia had "violated the core principles of the Helsinki Final Act, the Charter of Paris ... all in the name of defending a sphere of influence on its borders." In April 2014, NATO stated that, contrary to the Founding Act,

Russia now appears to be attempting to recreate a sphere of influence by seizing a part of Ukraine, maintaining large numbers of forces on its borders, and demanding, as Russian Foreign Minister Sergei Lavrov recently stated, that "Ukraine cannot be part of any bloc."

Criticising Russia in November 2014, German Chancellor Angela Merkel said that "old thinking about spheres of influence, which runs roughshod over international law" put the "entire European peace order into question." In January 2017, British Prime Minister Theresa May said, "We should not jeopardise the freedoms that President Reagan and Mrs Thatcher brought to Eastern Europe by accepting President Putin's claim that it is now in his sphere of influence."

=== Contemporary European Union (1990s–present) ===
European Neighbourhood Policy (ENP) EU member states EU enlargement agenda Eastern Partnership ENP countries Other ENP countries (all but Libya are UfM members) UfM member

In 2009, Russia asserted that the European Union desires a sphere of influence and that the Eastern Partnership is "an attempt to extend" it. In March that year, Swedish Foreign Minister Carl Bildt stated that the "Eastern Partnership is not about spheres of influence. The difference is that these countries themselves opted to join."

== Corporations ==
In corporate terms, the sphere of influence of a business, organization, or group can show its power and influence in the decisions of other businesses/organizations/groups. The influence shows in several ways, such as in size, frequency of visits, etc. In most cases, a company described as "bigger" has a larger sphere of influence.

For example, the software company Microsoft has a large sphere of influence in the market of operating systems; any entity wishing to sell a software product may weigh up compatibility with Microsoft's products as part of a marketing plan. In another example, retailers wishing to make the most profits must ensure they open their stores in the correct location. This is also true for shopping centers that, to reap the most profits, must be able to attract customers to their vicinity.

There is no defined scale measuring such spheres of influence. However, one can evaluate the spheres of influence of two shopping centers by seeing how far people are prepared to travel to each shopping center, how much time they spend in its vicinity, how often they visit, the order of goods available, etc.

Corporations have significant influence on the regulations and regulators that monitor them. During the Gilded Age in the United States, corruption was rampant as business leaders spent significant amounts of money ensuring that government did not regulate their activities. Wall Street spent a record $2 billion trying to influence the 2016 United States elections.

== List of spheres of influence ==
- America's Backyard – areas of United States' influence in the American continent
- Anglosphere – English-speaking world
- Arabsphere – Arabic-speaking world
- Christendom – the Christian world
- Eurosphere – area with European Union influence
- Francosphere – French-speaking world
- Germanosphere – German-speaking world
- Greater East Asia Co-Prosperity Sphere – imperial influence of the Empire of Japan
- Hispanosphere – Spanish-speaking world
- Indosphere – area with Indian linguistic and cultural influence (Greater India)
- Islamosphere – the Muslim world
- Persophere – historically Iran-influenced cultures
- Russian world – Russian-speaking world
- Sinosphere – historically Chinese-influenced cultures
- Slavisphere – Slavic influence
- Soviet sphere of influence – imperial influence of the Soviet Union

=== Other examples ===
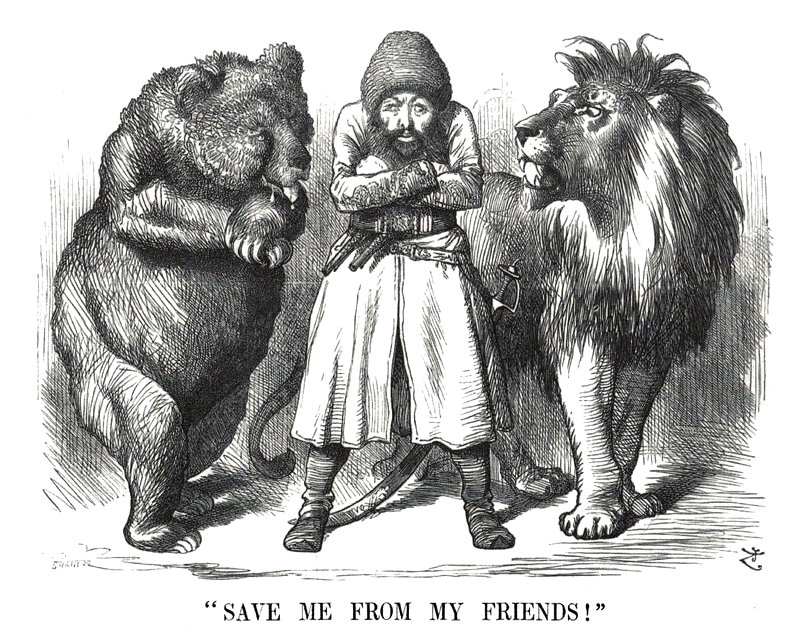
An 1878 British cartoon about the Great Game between the United Kingdom and Russia over influence in Central Asia

For historical and current examples of significant battles over spheres of influence see:

- The Great Game
- Geostrategy in Central Asia

== See also ==
- Balance of power (international relations)
- Cultural area
- Geopolitics
- Informal empire
- Iron Curtain
- National interest
- Right of conquest
- Sprachbund
- Suzerainty
- Unequal treaties
- Vassal state
