= Privileged partnership =

Cooperation between the EU and a non-EU country

Privileged partnership is a generic term for increased cooperation between the European Union and a non-EU country to advance common goals, often without pursuing EU membership.

== History ==
The term was initially used to describe an alternative to EU membership for Turkey that was first floated in November 2002 by Heinrich August Winkler in Die Zeit and later formally proposed in 2004, although the term was used previously in 2003 to describe a proposed relationship with Russia and was also used in 2004 for a proposed relationship with Israel.

Since that time, the term has been used for alternatives for EU membership for Albania, Bosnia and Herzegovina, Croatia, North Macedonia, Serbia, Montenegro, and Kosovo. It has since been used retrospectively to characterize relationships with the countries considered in 2004 for the European Neighbourhood Policy that were first proposed in the Commission Communication of March 2003, and is also used for the EU's bilateral relationship with Tunisia and with Russia.

Ultimately, the term dates back to 1957 when it was used to characterize Morocco's relationship with the European Economic Community.

== By country ==
=== Albania ===
The term was used for a proposed alternative to EU membership for Albania.

=== Algeria ===
The term has been used for the proposed relationship with the countries considered in 2004 for the European Neighbourhood Policy, including Algeria.

=== Armenia ===
The term has been used for the proposed relationship with the countries considered in 2004 for the European Neighbourhood Policy, including Armenia.

=== Azerbaijan ===
The term has been used for the proposed relationship with the countries considered in 2004 for the European Neighbourhood Policy, including Azerbaijan.

=== Belarus ===
The term has been used for the proposed relationship with the countries considered in 2004 for the European Neighbourhood Policy, including Belarus.

=== Bosnia and Herzegovina ===
The term was used for a proposed alternative to EU membership for Bosnia and Herzegovina.

=== Croatia ===
The term was used for a proposed alternative to EU membership for Croatia. The option was dropped in favor of full membership. Croatia joined the union in July 2013.

=== Egypt ===
The term has been used for the proposed relationship with the countries considered in 2004 for the European Neighbourhood Policy, including Egypt.

=== North Macedonia ===
The term was used for a proposed alternative to EU membership for North Macedonia.

=== Georgia ===
The term has been used for the proposed relationship with the countries considered in 2004 for the European Neighbourhood Policy, including Georgia.

=== Israel ===
The term was used by Spanish foreign minister Miguel Ángel Moratinos, who spoke out for a "privileged partnership, offering all the benefits of EU membership, without participation in the institutions" for Israel. It was also used for the proposed relationship with the countries considered in 2004 for the European Neighbourhood Policy, including Israel.

=== Jordan ===
The term has been used for the proposed relationship with the countries considered in 2004 for the European Neighbourhood Policy, including Jordan.

=== Kosovo ===
The term was used for a proposed alternative to EU membership for Kosovo.

=== Lebanon ===
The term has been used for the proposed relationship with the countries considered in 2004 for the European Neighbourhood Policy, including Lebanon.

=== Libya ===
The term has been used for the proposed relationship with the countries considered in 2004 for the European Neighbourhood Policy, including Libya.

=== Moldova ===
The term has been used for the proposed relationship with the countries considered in 2004 for the European Neighbourhood Policy, including Moldova.

=== Morocco ===
The term has been used for the proposed relationship with the countries considered in 2004 for the European Neighbourhood Policy, including Morocco.

=== Palestine ===
The term has been used for the proposed relationship with the countries considered in 2004 for the European Neighbourhood Policy, including the Palestinian Authority.

=== Russia ===
French President Jacques Chirac used the term for a proposed Russia-EU relationship at the Russia-EU summit in 2003.

=== Serbia and Montenegro ===
The term was used for a proposed alternative to EU membership for Serbia and Montenegro.

=== Syria ===
The term has been used for the proposed relationship with the countries considered in 2004 for the European Neighbourhood Policy, including Syria.

=== Tunisia ===
The term has been used for the proposed relationship with the countries considered in 2004 for the European Neighbourhood Policy, including Tunisia.

=== Turkey ===
Privileged partnership (Turkish: İmtiyazlı ortaklık) was the term used by Angela Merkel in February 2004 to describe a future relationship between Turkey and the European Union which fell short of full membership. The proposal was advanced by CDU/CSU members.

=== Ukraine ===
The term has been used for the proposed relationship with the countries considered in 2004 for the European Neighbourhood Policy, including Ukraine.

=== United Kingdom ===
The term was used by Jacques Delors for a proposed relationship between the European Union and the United Kingdom should it exit the EU.

== See also ==
- Eastern Partnership
- Enlargement of the European Union
- European integration
- European Union Association Agreement
- Potential enlargement of the European Union
