= Eurosphere =

European Union and neighbouring states

The Eurosphere or the European Empire is a concept centered around the European Union's sphere of influence, a term associated with the public intellectual Mark Leonard, Oxford University academic Jan Zielonka, the European Union Director-General for Politico-Military Affairs Robert Cooper and the former European Commission President José Manuel Barroso.

== Background ==
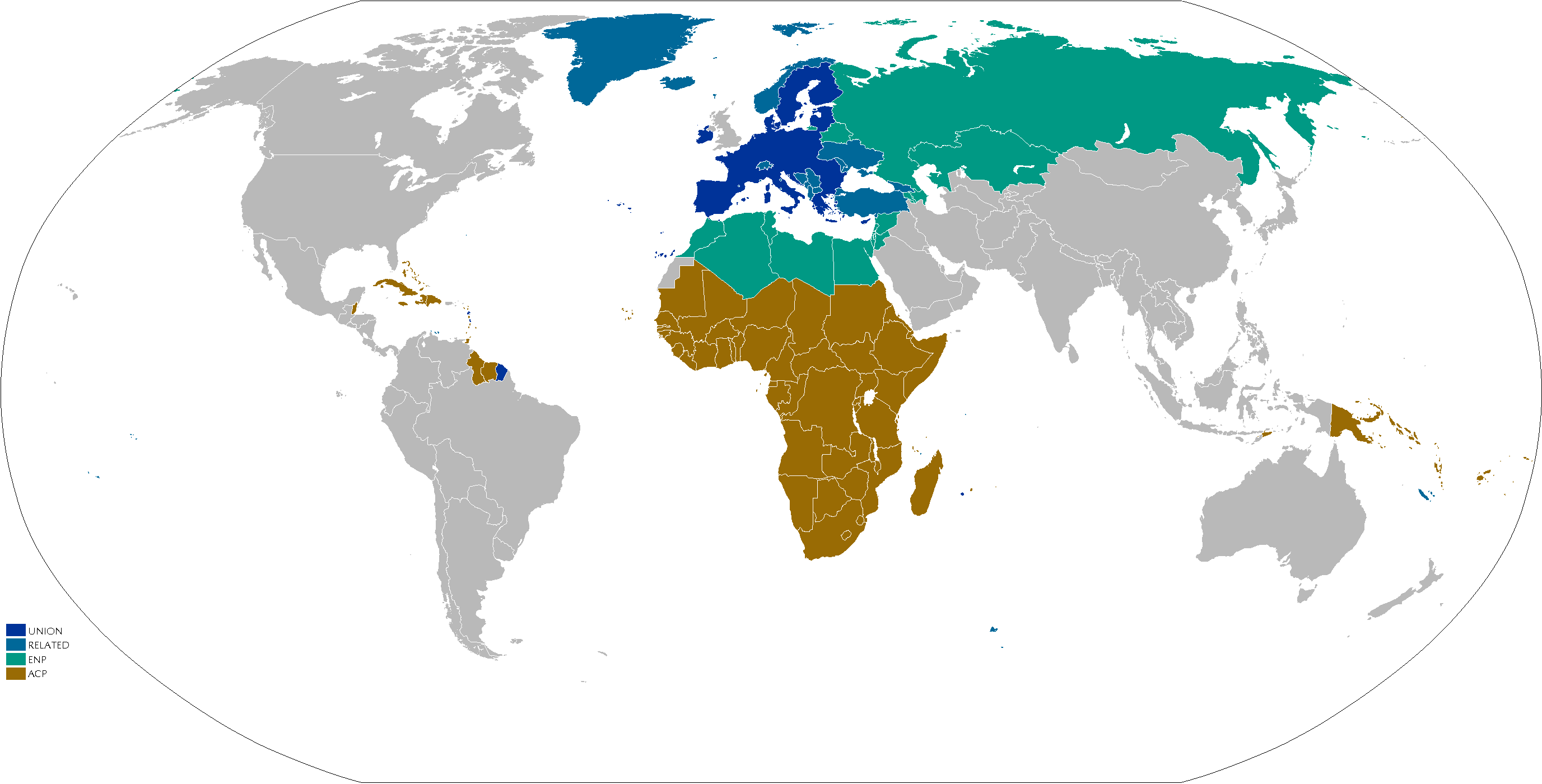
Cited Eurosphere: Dark blue: European Union; Light blue: Current enlargement agenda; Turquoise: European Neighbourhood; Brown: ACP countries

Over the past 50 years, the European Union has expanded from 6 founding members to 27; additionally, there are 7 candidate and potential candidate countries waiting to join: Albania, Montenegro, North Macedonia, Serbia, Turkey, Bosnia and Herzegovina, and Ukraine, which are candidates, and Kosovo, which is a potential candidate. A number of European countries are integrated economically, as part of the European Single Market and use its single currency, the euro. Through its High Representative of the Union for Foreign Affairs and Security Policy, the EU has the capability to speak with one voice on the world stage and has established association and free trade agreements with many states. Furthermore, through the European Neighbourhood Policy and Union for the Mediterranean it is creating closer ties with countries on its borders while developing ties with other former European colonies, the ACP countries.

Countries seeking membership in the EU must undergo a great deal of reform, for example, the reforms seen in Turkey, such as the abolition of capital punishment. The emergence of the Union's global influence and the draw of membership have been the subject of a number of academic writings. Mark Leonard describes the area of EU influence as the "Eurosphere".

== Countries within the Eurosphere ==
A clickable Euler diagram showing the relationships between various European regional organisations

According to Mark Leonard, the Eurosphere includes 109 countries. In Europe, this includes the 27 member states of the EU, applicant countries wishing to join the EU, the Western Balkans and European Commonwealth of Independent States countries (including Armenia, Belarus, Georgia, Moldova, Ukraine and transcontinental Kazakhstan). He does not mention Western European countries such as Norway who are already integrated into the EU's single market. Outside of Europe, he lists every African country and every Middle Eastern country, as well as the countries forming the eastern border of the Eurosphere, such as Iran, Azerbaijan and Russia.

Other countries that could be said to be within the Eurosphere include European countries belonging to the European Economic Area, such as Iceland or Liechtenstein, states using the euro as their currency, such as Andorra, Monaco and San Marino, or the EU's Outermost Regions (OMR) in the Caribbean, South America, and in the Atlantic, such as French Guiana, Guadeloupe, La Réunion, Martinique and Saint Martin. In addition, the Overseas Countries and Territories (OCT) closely associated with the EU in the Atlantic, Caribbean, Pacific, and Southern oceans are generally included in the Eurosphere, such as Aruba, Bonaire, Curaçao, French Polynesia, Greenland and Saint-Pierre-et-Miquelon.

== See also ==
- Council of Europe
- Deep and Comprehensive Free Trade Area
- ECHO (European Commission)
  - ACP-EU Development Cooperation
    - ACP-EU Joint Parliamentary Assembly
    - EU-ACP Economic Partnership Agreements
- Enlargement of the European Union
  - European Union Association Agreement
  - European Economic Area
  - Potential enlargement of the European Union
- Eurasian Economic Union
- European integration
- European Neighbourhood Policy
  - Eastern Partnership
    - Euronest Parliamentary Assembly
  - Barcelona Process
    - Euro-Mediterranean Parliamentary Assembly
    - Mediterranean Union
- European Political Community
- European Union as a potential superpower
- EuroVoc
- Foreign relations of the European Union
  - EU economic relationships
- Greater Europe
- Multi-speed Europe
- Pro-Europeanism
- United States of Europe
- Southeast Europe Transport Community
