= European Union's economic relationships with third countries =

EU relationships

The European Union has a number of relationships with foreign states. According to the European Union's official site, and a statement by Commissioner Günter Verheugen, the aim is to have a ring of countries, sharing EU's democratic ideals and joining them in further integration without necessarily becoming full member states.

== EFTA and EEA ==
The European Free Trade Association (EFTA) was created to allow European countries to partake in a free trade area with less integration as within the European Communities (later European Union). Most of the countries initially in EFTA have since joined the EU itself, so only four remain outside, Norway, Iceland, Liechtenstein and Switzerland.

The European Economic Area (EEA) agreement allows Norway, Iceland and Liechtenstein to have access to the EU's internal market and vice versa. The four basic freedoms (goods, services, people, and capital) apply. However, some restrictions on fisheries and agriculture take place.

=== Norway ===
Norway is a member of the EEA, therefore it participates in the single market, and most EU laws are made part of Norwegian law. Norway has signed the Schengen treaty, which means border checks are no longer made.

=== Iceland ===
Like Norway, Iceland joined the EEA, and is considered part of the European Single Market. Iceland has also signed the Schengen treaty. In 2009 Iceland applied to join the Union but the application was controversial and the Icelandic government withdrew it in 2015.

=== Liechtenstein ===
Liechtenstein joined the EEA in 1995 and participates in the European Single Market.

=== Switzerland ===
The Swiss referendum to join the EEA in 1992 failed, so Swiss products do not participate in the European Single Market. However the country negotiated two series of bilateral agreements with the Union. The first series, Bilateral Agreements I, consists of seven bilateral agreements and was signed in 1999 (entry into force in 2001), the main part being Free Movement of Persons (full text of the agreement). The second series, Bilateral Agreements II, relates to nine areas and was signed in 2004 (entered into full force on 30 March 2005) and includes the Schengen treaty and the Dublin Convention (full text of the agreement) (official press release).

== Eurozone-related ==
There are four European microstates which are neither EU member-states nor full eurozone members, but nevertheless use and mint the euro as their legal currency under official agreements with the EU. All of them previously used the national currencies of their larger neighbours, Italy, France and Spain, which have since all become eurozone-members.

- San Marino: San Marino is not a member state of the EU, but had a special agreement with Italy to mint a limited number of its own lira coins. There is an agreement to mint its own euro coins (limited) which are legal tender in the eurozone.
- Vatican City: The Vatican City is not part of the EU, but had a special agreement with Italy to mint a limited number of its own lira coins. There is an agreement to mint its own euro coins (limited) which are legal tender in the eurozone.
- Monaco: Monaco is not a member state of the EU, it had a special agreement with France to mint its own franc coins. There is an agreement to mint its own euro coins (limited), which are legal tender in the eurozone.
- Andorra: Andorra is not part of the EU. In the 20th century, both the French franc and Spanish peseta were used and accepted in Andorra, but the peseta was more widespread There is an agreement to mint its own euro coins (limited) which are legal tender in the eurozone.

In addition, two dependent territories outside of the EU use the euro as their currency under agreements with the EU, though without minting their own euro coins:

- Saint Barthélemy is not a part of the EU, but there is an agreement with the EU to use euro as its currency, though without minting own euro coins. The French franc was used there before.
- Akrotiri and Dhekelia is not a part of the EU, but there is an agreement between the United Kingdom and the EU to use euro as its currency, though without minting own euro coins. The Cypriot pound was used there before.

Some other countries unilaterally decided to use the euro as their de facto currency without having currently a formal agreement with the EU.

== Customs unions ==
Certain countries and territories are in customs union with the EU. These are:

- Monaco: relations between the Principality of Monaco and the EU are primarily conducted through France. Through that relationship Monaco directly participates in certain EU policies, including being an integral part of the EU customs territory and VAT area.
- Turkey (excluding agricultural products; since 1996)
- Andorra (excluding agricultural products; since 1991)
- San Marino (signed in 1991 and in force since 2002)
- Akrotiri and Dhekelia are partially part of the European Union Customs Union in three domains: VAT, agriculture and fisheries.

== European Union free trade agreements ==
EU Free trade agreements European Union Agreement in force Agreement (in part) provisionally applied

The EU has concluded free trade agreements with many countries in the world, and is negotiating with more through the Stabilisation and Association Process, Eastern Partnership, Association Agreements and Economic Partnership Agreements.

== European Neighbourhood Policy ==
EU European Neighbourhood Policy EU member states EU enlargement agenda Eastern Partnership ENP countries Other ENP countries (all but Libya are UfM members) UfM members, which are not an ENP country, part of the EU or its enlargement agenda)

Covers Morocco, Algeria, Tunisia, Libya, Egypt, Jordan, Lebanon, Syria, Israel, Palestinian Authority, Moldova, Ukraine, Georgia, Armenia, Azerbaijan, Belarus, and Russia (through the formation of common spaces).

According to the European Union's official site, the objective of the European Neighbourhood Policy (ENP) is to share the benefits of the EU's 2004 enlargement with neighbouring countries. It is also designed to prevent the emergence of new dividing lines between the enlarged EU and its neighbours. The vision is that of a ring of countries, drawn into further integration, but without necessarily becoming full members of the European Union. The policy was first outlined by the European Commission in March 2003. The countries covered include all of the Mediterranean shores of Africa and Asia, as well as the European CIS states (with the exception of Russia and Kazakhstan) in the Caucasus and eastern Europe. Russia insisted on the creation of the four EU–Russia Common Spaces instead of ENP participation. Kazakhstan's Foreign Ministry has expressed interest in the ENP. Some MEPs also discussed Kazakhstan's inclusion in the ENP.

The European Neighbourhood Instrument (ENI), came into force in 2014. It is the financial arm of the European Neighbourhood Policy, the EU's foreign policy towards its neighbours to the East and to the South. It has a budget of €15.4 billion and provides the bulk of funding through a number of programmes. The ENI, effective from 2014 to 2020, replaces the European Neighbourhood and Partnership Instrument – known as the ENPI.

The Euro-Mediterranean Partnership or Barcelona Process is a wide framework of political, economic and social relations between member states of the EU and countries of the Southern Mediterranean. It was initiated on 27–28 November 1995 through a conference of Ministers of Foreign Affairs, held in Barcelona. Besides the 27 member states of the European Union, the remaining "Mediterranean Partners" are all other Mediterranean countries without Libya (which has had 'observer status' since 1999). Since the establishment of the European Neighbourhood and Partnership Instrument in 2007 (see below) the Euro-Mediterranean Partnership initiative will become fully a part of the wider European Neighbourhood Policy. The Association Agreements signed with the Mediterranean states aim at establishing of a Euro-Mediterranean free trade area.

== Financial cooperation and assistance programmes ==
=== For the 2000–2006 budgetary period ===
==== CARDS programme ====
CARDS, short for "Community Assistance for Reconstruction, Development and Stabilisation", was established on 5 December 2000 through Council regulation Number 2666/2000.

Its scope is the Western Balkans countries (Albania, Bosnia and Herzegovina, Kosovo, Macedonia, Montenegro and Serbia). The programme's wider objective is to support those nations in the Stabilisation and Association Process.

==== TACIS programme ====
The TACIS programme, established in 1991, was a programme of technical assistance that supports the process of transition to market economies for the 11 CIS countries and Georgia. Until 2003, Mongolia was also included in the programme but is now covered by the ALA programme.

==== MEDA programme ====
The MEDA programme was the principal financial instrument for the implementation of the Euro-Mediterranean Partnership, offering technical and financial support measures to accompany the reform of economic and social structures in the Mediterranean partner countries.

The first MEDA programme was established for the period of 1995–1999. In November 2000, a new regulation established MEDA II for the period of 2000–2006.

==== ACP programme ====
ACP stands for "Africa, Caribbean and Pacific". The programme applies to 71 countries, among which are all African nations with the exception of the Mediterranean countries of northern Africa (covered by the MEDA programme above). The ACP is currently covered by the Cotonou Agreement, which replaces the Lomé Convention.

External links: ACP Countries at official EU site

==== ALA programme ====
ALA, standing for "Asia and Latin America" is a programme for financial aid and cooperation with those regions.

=== For the 2007–2013 budgetary period ===
- ENPI, standing for "European Neighbourhood and Partnership Instrument". This is a financial instrument that covers the ENP countries. Russia is also covered by ENPI (it chose not to participate in the European Neighbourhood Policy (ENP) and opted for the formally different, but practically similar EU–Russia Common Spaces. Because of this is the "Partnership" part of ENPI). ENPI therefore merges the former MEDA (as all of its current beneficiaries are ENP states) and the European part of the former TACIS structure. The ENPI Info Centre was launched in January 2009 by the European Commission to highlight the relationship between the EU and its Neighbours.
- The Pre Accession Instrument replaces the former Enlargement programmes Phare, SAPARD and ISPA and CARDS (current CARDS beneficent states were moved to the Enlargement policy segment as "potential candidate countries").
- The Development Cooperation and Economic Cooperation Instrument covers all countries, territories and regions that are not eligible for assistance under either the PAI or ENPI (Asia, including Central Asia, Latin America, Africa, Caribbean and Pacific). Thus it will replace ALA, ACP and the rest of TACIS.
- Horizontal instruments, that cover countries regardless of their region, are:
  - the Instrument for Stability, a new instrument to tackle crises and instability in third countries and address trans-border challenges including nuclear safety and non-proliferation, the fight against trafficking, organised crime and terrorism.
  - Food aid is added to the Humanitarian Aid instrument.
  - the Macro Financial Assistance will remain unchanged.

== Economic variation ==
Below is a table and three graphs showing, respectively, the GDP (PPP), the GDP (PPP) per capita and the GDP (nominal) per capita for some of the third countries that the European Union has relations with. This can be used as a rough gauge to the relative standards of living among member states.

The table is sorted by GDP (PPP) per capita to show the relative economic development level of the different countries. Reference values for the EU average, highest and lowest are included.

Third country	GDP (PPP) millions of int. dollars	GDP (PPP) per capita int. dollars	GDP (nominal) per capita int. dollars
European Economic Area:
Luxembourg (EU highest)	96,886	143,742.69	131,384.164
European Union (EU average)	26,308,203	58,838.098	42,443.319
Bulgaria (EU lowest)	229,107	35,963.358	16,942.519
European Free Trade Association:
Switzerland	816,456	91,931.752	105,668.981
Iceland	29,077	73,783.627	84,593.939
Liechtenstein (2022)	4,978 (2014 est.)	123,609 (2014 est)	187,267.1
Norway	461,107	82,831.777	94,659.918
European Microstates:
Vatican City unique noncommercial economy	252	273,615	no data
San Marino	2,978	86,988.999	59,405.352
Monaco (2022)	7,672 (2015 est.)	115,700 (2015 est.)	240,862.2
Andorra	6,001	69,146.025	44,899.596
Current Enlargement Agenda:
Albania	58,795	20,632.444	8,924.317
Bosnia and Herzegovina	71,254	20,622.798	8,415.970
Kosovo (under UNSCR 1244)	29,719	16,775.149	6,388.731
Montenegro	18,812	29,695.785	12,645.548
North Macedonia	45,905	25,586.124	8,847.378
Serbia	185,014	27,984.719	12,383.904
Turkey	3,831,533	43,920.715	12,764.707
European Neighbourhood Policy:
Israel	552,151	55,532.543	53,371.545
Libya	182,897	26,456.471	6,975.33
Russia	5,472,880	38,292.239	14,391.176
Tunisia	168,315	13,644.731	4,435.001
Belarus	234,661	25,685.299	7,557.795
Algeria	768,521	16,482.600	5,721.678
Ukraine	515,947	15,463.851	5,662.948
Lebanon (2022)	70,558	12,852.7	3,823.9
Jordan	141,191	12,401.617	4,705.339
Azerbaijan	199,195	19,327.534	7,640.915
Morocco	409,073	10,946.567	4,077.525
Egypt	1,898,538	17,614.053	3,224.868
Armenia	64,432	21,746.233	8,575.301
Syria (2021)	62,151	2,914.5	421,1
Georgia	94,020	25,248.121	8,825.411
Moldova	43,882	17,901.591	7,488.443
Palestinian Authority (2023)	30,418	5,888.4	3,367.6

Source: IMF World Economic Outlook April 2024, World Bank Indicators (Lebanon, Syria, Palestinian Authority, Liechtenstein (nominal GDP per capita), Monaco (nominal GDP per capita)), CIA World Factbook (Liechtenstein and Monaco (PPP GDP and PPD GDP per capita)), Unknown for Vatican Data

== See also ==
- List of the largest trading partners of the European Union
- European Association for Evolutionary and Political Economy
- European Union Association Agreement
- European Union free trade agreements
- EU-Russia Common Spaces
- Free trade areas in Europe
- Special member state territories and the European Union
- Yugoslavia and the European Economic Community
- EEC-Euratom-Soviet Union Agreement on trade and commercial and economic cooperation
- Southeast Europe Transport Community
- EU Neighbourhood Info Centre
- EU Neighbourhood Library
