= Erich Obst =

German geographer and geopolitician

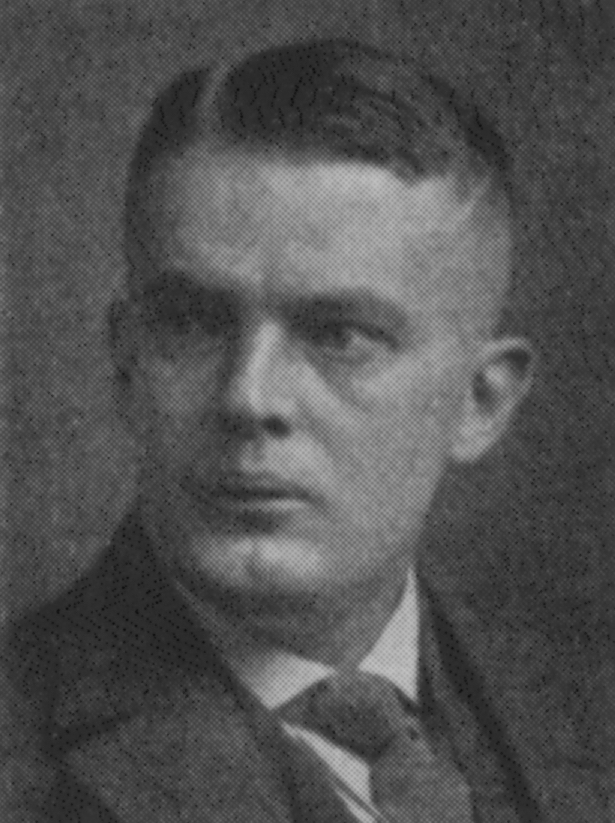
Image of Obst Erich

Karl August Erich Obst (13 September 1886 – 9 June 1981) was a German geographer and geopolitician. Between 1924 and 1944 he was the editor of the German geopolitical magazine "Zeitschrift für Geopolitik".
