= Luiza Bialasiewicz =

Dutch-British political geographer

Luiza Bialasiewicz is a political geographer and Professor of European Governance in the Department of European Studies at the University of Amsterdam. Before moving to Amsterdam in 2011, she was Senior Lecturer in the Department of Geography at Royal Holloway, and prior to that, Lecturer in the Department of Geography at the University of Durham. Bialasiewicz obtained her Ph.D. from the University of Colorado at Boulder. Since 2013, Bialasiewicz has been Visiting Professor at the College of Europe, Natolin, where she teaches a course on European Geopolitics.

== Research interests ==
Bialasiewicz's work focuses on EU foreign policy and on the role of Europe in the wider world. Her most recent research has examined the intersection of EU border management and EU geopolitics, looking specifically at the role of third states in the 'out-sourcing' of border controls in the Mediterranean.

== Full publication list ==
=== Books ===
- Bialasiewicz, L, and V. Gentile, eds. (2019). Spaces of Tolerance: Changing Geographies and Philosophies of Religion in Today's Europe. London: Routledge. ISBN 9780367224073
- Bialasiewicz, L., ed. (2011) Europe in the World: EU Geopolitics and the Making of European Space. London: Routledge. Paperback edition 2016 ISBN 9781138269347
- Minca, C. and L. Bialasiewicz (2004). Spazio e Politica: Riflessioni di geografia critica. Padova: CEDAM. ISBN 978-88-13-25491-9

=== Journal articles ===
- Bialasiewicz, L, Giaccaria, P, Jones, A and Minca C (2013). Re-scaling 'EU'rope: EU Macroregional Fantasies in the Mediterranean. European Urban and Regional Studies 20(1)
- Bachmann, V, Bialasiewicz, L, Sidaway, JD, Feldman, M, Holgerson, S, Malm, A, Mohammad, R, Saldanha, A and Simonsen, K (2012). Bloodlands: critical geographical responses to the 22 July 2011 events in Norway. Environment and Planning D: Society and Space 30: 191–206.
- Bialasiewicz, L. (2012). Off-shoring and out-sourcing the borders of Europe: Libya and EU border-work in the Mediterranean. Geopolitics 17(4)
- Bialasiewicz, L. (2011). Borders, above all? Political Geography 30:299-300.
- Bialasiewicz, L. and Minca, C. (2010). "The Border Within": Inhabiting theborder in Trieste. Environment and Planning D: Society and Space 28(6):1084-1105.
- Marksoo, U ., Bialasiewicz, L. and Best, U. (2010). The Global Economic Crisis and Regional Divides in the European Union: Spatial Patterns of Unemployment in Estonia and Poland. Eurasian Geography and Economics 51(1):52-79.
- Bialasiewicz, L. (2009). The new political geographies of the European 'neighbourhood'. Political Geography 28:79-89 (Editor - special symposium).
- Bialasiewicz, L. (2009). Europe as/at the border: Trieste and the Meaning of Europe. Social and Cultural Geography 10(3):325-342.
- Parker., N. and N. Vaughan-Williams, together with Bialasiewicz, L., Bulmer, S., Carver, B., Drurie, R, Heathershaw, J.; van Houtum, H., Kinvall, C., Kramsch, O., Minca, C., Murray A., Panjek, A., Rumford, C., Schaap, A., Sidaway, J., and Williams, J. (2009). Lines in the Sand: Towards an Agenda for Critical Border Studies. Geopolitics 14:582-587.
- Bialasiewicz, L. (2008). The Uncertain State(s) of Europe. European Urban and Regional Studies 15(1):71-82.
- Bialasiewicz, L., Campbell, D., Elden, S., Graham, S., Jeffrey, A. and Williams, A. (2007). Performing Security: The Imaginative Geographies of Current US Strategy. Political Geography 26(4):405-422.
- Feakins, M. and Bialasiewicz, L. (2006). 'Trouble in the East': The New Entrants and Challenges to theEuropean Ideal. Eurasian Geography and Economics 47(6):647-661.
- Bialasiewicz, L. (2006). 'The Death of the West': Samuel Huntington, Oriana Fallaci and a new 'moral' geopolitics of births and bodies. Geopolitics 11:701-724.
- Elden, S. and L. Bialasiewicz. (2006). The New Geopolitics of Division and the Problem of a Kantian Europe. Review of International Studies 32(4):623-644.
- Bialasiewicz, L. (2006). Geographies of production and the contexts of politics: dis-location and new ecologies of fear in the Veneto città diffusa . Environment and Planning D: Society and Space 24(1):41-67.
- Bialasiewicz, L. and C. Minca (2005). Old Europe, New Europe: for a geopolitics of translation. Area 37(4):365-372.
- Bialasiewicz, L., S. Elden and J. Painter (2005). The Constitution of EU Territory. Comparative European Politics 3(3): 333–363.
- Bialasiewicz, L., S. Elden and J. Painter (2005). "The Best Defence of Our Security Lies in the Spread of our Values. Europe, America and the Question of Values". Environment and Planning D: Society and Space 23(2): 159–64.
- Bialasiewicz, L. (2003). Another Europe: remembering Habsburg Galicja. Cultural Geographies 10(1): 21–44.
- Bialasiewicz, L. (2003). The many wor(l)ds of differenceand dissent. Antipode 35(1):14-23.
- Bialasiewicz, L. (2003). Europa Geopolitikaja. Ter Es Tarsadalom 2:111-112.
- Minca, C. and L. Bialasiewicz (2003). Geografia critica. Rivista Geografica Italiana 110:561-575.
- Bialasiewicz, L. (2002). The rebirth of Upper Silesia. Regional and Federal Studies 12(2): 111–132.

=== Book chapters ===
- Bialasiewicz, L. (2012). Spectres of Europe: Europes past, present, and future. The Oxford Handbook of Post-War European History. (D. Stone, ed.) Oxford: Oxford University Press.
- Bialasiewicz, L. (2011). Another Europe. In Passion of an ornithologist: on myth-making/Pasja ornitologa: tworzenie mitu . (A. Budak, ed.) Nowy Sącz: BWA SOKÓŁ Gallery of Contemporary Art.
- Bialasiewicz, L. (2005). Back to Galicia Felix . In Galicia: A Multicultured Land. (P.R. Magocsi and C. Hann, eds.) Toronto: University of Toronto Press.
- Bialasiewicz, L. (2005). Urban Politics and the Geopolitics of Heritage: 'Branding' the Post-Socialist State. In Lo Spettacolo della Città. (C. Minca, ed.) Padova: CEDAM.
- Bialasiewicz, L. (2004). A society to match the scenery? Ordering the spaces of the Veneto città diffusa . In The European City in Transition: Urbanism and Globalisation. (F. Eckardt and D. Hassenpflug, eds.) Frankfurt am Main: Peter Lang.
- Bialasiewicz, L. and J. O'Loughlin (2002). Re-ordering Europe's Eastern frontier: Galicjan Identities and Political Cartographies on the Polish-Ukrainian Border. In Boundaries and Place: European Borderlands in Geographical Context. (D. Kaplan & J. Hakli, eds.). London: Rowman & Littlefield.
