= European Neighbourhood Policy =

Foreign relations policy of the European Union

European Neighbourhood Policy (ENP): EU member states EU enlargement agenda Eastern Partnership ENP countries Other ENP countries (all but Libya are UfM members) Member states of the UfM that are neither ENP countries, members of the EU, or participants in its enlargement agenda

The European Neighbourhood Policy (ENP) is a foreign relations instrument of the European Union (EU) which seeks to tie those countries to the east and south of the European territory of the EU to the Union. These countries include some who seek to one day become either a member state of the European Union, or become more closely integrated with the European Union. The ENP does not apply to neighbours of the EU's outermost regions, specifically France's territories in South America, but only to those countries close to EU member states' territories in mainland Europe.

The countries covered are Algeria, Egypt, Israel, Jordan, Lebanon, Libya, Morocco, Palestine, Syria, Tunisia in the South; and Armenia, Azerbaijan, Belarus, Georgia, Moldova, Ukraine in the East. Russia has a special status with the EU-Russia Common Spaces instead of ENP participation. The EU offers financial assistance to countries within the European Neighbourhood, so long as they meet the strict conditions of government reform, economic reform and other issues surrounding positive transformation. This process is normally underpinned by an Action Plan agreed by Brussels and the target country. The ENP does not cover countries in the current EU enlargement agenda, the European Free Trade Association or the western European microstates.

The EU typically concludes Association Agreements in exchange for commitments to political, economic, trade, or human rights reform in a country. In exchange, the country may be offered tariff-free access to some or all EU markets (notably industrial goods or agricultural products) and financial or technical assistance.

== History ==
=== Establishment ===
The European Union's European Neighbourhood Policy aims at bringing Europe and its neighbours closer. It was conceived after the 2004 enlargement of the European Union with 10 new member countries, in order to avoid creating new borders in Europe. It is also designed to prevent the emergence of new dividing lines between the enlarged EU and its neighbours. The vision is that of a ring of countries, drawn into further integration, but without necessarily becoming full members of the European Union. The policy was first outlined by the European Commission in March 2003.

The countries covered include Algeria, Egypt, Israel, Jordan, Lebanon, Libya, Morocco, Palestine, Syria, Tunisia in the South and Armenia, Azerbaijan, Belarus, Georgia, Moldova, Ukraine in the East. Russia has a special status with the EU–Russia Common Spaces instead of ENP participation.

On 25 May 2011, the European Commission launched what it described as a new and ambitious European Neighbourhood Policy, backed by more than €1.2 billion in new funding, bringing the total to almost €7 billion. The main priorities and directions of a revitalised ENP strategy are set out in the Joint Communication by the European Commission and the High Representative for Foreign Affairs, titled "A new response to a changing Neighbourhood". It seeks to strengthen individual and regional relationships between the EU and countries in its neighbourhood through a "more funds for more reform" approach – making more additional funds available, but with more mutual accountability.

In the South, the first comprehensive policy for the region was the Euro-Mediterranean Partnership (or Barcelona Process) a wide framework of political, economic and social relations between member states of the EU and countries of the Southern Mediterranean. It was initiated on 27–28 November 1995 through a conference of Ministers of Foreign Affairs, held in Barcelona. Besides the 27 member states of the European Union, the remaining "Mediterranean Partners" are all other Mediterranean countries including Libya (which had 'observer status' from 1999 to 2012).

In the East, the Eastern Partnership (EaP) is a policy initiative launched at the Prague Summit in May 2009 that aims to bring the six Eastern European neighbours (Armenia, Azerbaijan, Belarus, Georgia, Moldova and Ukraine) closer to the EU. It represents the Eastern dimension of the ENP and strengthens bilateral relations between the EU and its partners. These states, with the exception of Belarus, also participate in the Euronest Parliamentary Assembly.

In March 2015, the European Commission launched a review of the principles on which the policy is based as well as its scope and how its instruments should be used. The consultation follows four priorities: differentiation; focus; flexibility; ownership and visibility. A Communication setting out proposals for the future direction of the ENP will follow in autumn.

=== Funding: from the ENPI via ENI to NDICI ===
Giving incentives and rewarding best performers, as well as offering funds in a faster and more flexible manner, were the two main principles underlying the European Neighbourhood Instrument (ENI) that came into force in 2014 and was merged in 2021 into Global Europe. It has a budget of €15.4 billion and provides the bulk of funding through a number of programmes and replaced The earlier European Neighbourhood and Partnership Instrument (ENPI). This cooperation instrument continues to be managed by Directorate-General for Development and Cooperation and EuropeAid, which turns decisions taken on a political level into actions on the ground. The ENPI funding approved for the 2007–2013 period was €11.2 billion.

Kazakhstan's Foreign Ministry has expressed interest in the ENP and some MEPs have also discussed Kazakhstan's inclusion in the ENP. The EU Neighbourhood Info Centre was launched in January 2009 by the European Commission to make more known the relationship between the EU and its neighbours.

== Agreements ==
Countries that could join the European Union: Current members Candidate countries Applicant / potential candidate countries Membership possible Membership not possible Located at least partially in Europe

In recent history, such agreements are signed as part of two EU policies: Stabilisation and Association Process (SAP) and European Neighbourhood Policy (ENP). The countries of the Mediterranean and the East European EU neighbours (including South Caucasus, but excluding Russia that insists on creating four EU–Russia Common Spaces) are covered by ENP through the Directorate-General for External Relations. In the ENP Association Agreements (as in similar AAs signed with Mexico and other states) there is no mention of EU membership—this is a concern only to the European ENP states, because for the Mediterranean they cannot join the union in its current form because they are not located in Europe. The ENP AAs are similar to the Partnership and Cooperation Agreements signed with CIS states in the 1990s and to the multiple other AAs governing the relations between the EU and other third countries. The ENP stipulates that after signing of AA with a particular country the EU will make a Country Report and then the two sides will agree on an Action Plan drafted by the EU (including particular reforms, actions and also aid by the EU) for the next three to five years.

Both the SAA and ENP AP are based mostly on the EU's acquis communautaire and its promulgation in the cooperating states legislation. Of course the depth of the harmonisation is less than for full EU members and some policy areas may not be covered (depending on the particular state).

According to EUobserver the ENP countries may be divided into two groups—European states with explicitly stated EU membership possibility for the long term and Mediterranean states with no such statement in the Action Plans. This division is obvious in the two groups for multilateral activities that are meant to supplement the bilateral ENP Action Plans—the Eastern Partnership and the Union for the Mediterranean.

Association Agreements have to be ratified by all the EU member states. AA signed with the Mediterranean states also include a Free Trade Agreement between the EU and the third country. For the East European EU neighbours covered by the ENP such provisions are expected for some of the next Action Plan periods.

== Criticism ==
Although the Eastern Partnership was inaugurated on 7 May 2009, academic research critically analysing the policy became available by early 2010 (see Elena Korosteleva#Building Research Excellence in Russian and East European Studies at the Universities of Tartu, Uppsala and Kent). Research findings from a UK ESRC research project examining the EU's relations with three Eastern Partnership member states—namely, Belarus, Ukraine, and Moldova—notes both conceptual and empirical dilemmas. First, conceptually the EU has limited uniform awareness of what it is trying to promote in its eastern neighbourhood under the aegis of "shared values", "collective norms", and "joint ownership". Secondly, empirically, the EU seems to favour a "top-down" governance approach (based on rule/norm transfer and conditionality) in its relations with outsiders, which is clearly at odds with a voluntary idea of "partnership", and explicitly limits the input of "the other" in the process of reform. This has led critics to argue that the neighbourhood policies are subordinated to the EU's interests and values, while the role of the "partners" is at best secondary.

The Arab Spring in North Africa shed light on the close personal and business ties between members of governing elites in EU member states and their Mediterranean counterparts. For example, French Foreign Minister Michèle Alliot-Marie was forced to resign due to public outrage over her links to the ousted Ben Ali regime in Tunisia. In 2008, the EU tried to negotiate an association agreement with Libya and earmarked €60 million in ENPI funds to the country over the 2011–2013 period.

== Status ==
ENP partner	EU Agreement	FTA provisions	Country Report	Action Plan	Adoption by the EU	Adoption by the ENP partner	AP duration	CFSP invitation	EU aspiration	Sub-group
Morocco	AA, March 2000	Yes	May 2004	End 2004	21 February 2005	27 July 2005	3–5 years	No	No	South
Algeria	AA, September 2005	Yes	Under development					No	No	South
Tunisia	AA, March 1998	Yes	May 2004	End 2004	21 February 2005	4 July 2005	3–5 years	No	No	South
Libya	Negotiations on Framework Agreement with Libya started in November 2008							No	No	South
Egypt	AA, June 2004	Yes	March 2005	End 2006	5 March 2007	6 March 2007	3–5 years	No	No	South
Jordan	AA, May 2002	Yes	May 2004	End 2004	21 February 2005	11 January 2005	3–5 years	Yes	No	South
Lebanon	AA, April 2006	Yes	March 2005	Autumn 2006	17 October 2006	19 January 2007	5 years	No	No	South
Syria	CA, November 1978	Updated AA initialed in December 2008, signature by the EU Council and ratification pending. Syria delayed signature in 2009. The EU expects full cooperation with the Special Tribunal for Lebanon.								South
Israel	AA, June 2000	Yes	May 2004	End 2004	21 February 2005	11 April 2005	3+ years	No	No	South
Palestinian Authority	Interim AA, July 1997	Yes	May 2004	End 2004	21 February 2005	4 May 2005	3–5 years	No	No	South
Moldova	AA, June 2014	DCFTA	May 2004	End 2004	21 February 2005	22 February 2005	3 years	Yes	Yes	East
Ukraine	AA, June 2014	DCFTA	May 2004	End 2004	21 February 2005	21 February 2005	3 years	Yes	Yes	East
Belarus	EU considers the Belarus authorities too undemocratic; PCA ratification procedure suspended since 1997.							No	No	East
Georgia	AA, June 2014	DCFTA	March 2005	Autumn 2006	13 November 2006	14 November 2006	5 years	Yes	Yes	East
Armenia	CEPA, March 2021	Negotiations	March 2005	Autumn 2006	13 November 2006	14 November 2006	5 years	Yes	Yes	East
Azerbaijan	PCA, July 1999	Not yet	March 2005	Autumn 2006	13 November 2006	14 November 2006	5 years	Yes	No	East
Other regional partners
Mauritania	As one of the ACP countries Mauritania is in the process of negotiating the West African Economic Partnership Agreement, but notwithstanding this it is a full member of the Union for the Mediterranean.							No	No	NONE
Russia	PCA, December 1997	No	Opted to cooperate through the formation of EU-Russia Common Spaces instead of the ENP. Roadmap (Action Plan substitute) adopted in May 2005					No	No	NONE
Kazakhstan	PCA, July 1999	No	The Kazakh Foreign Ministry has expressed interest in the ENP. Some MEPs also discussed Kazakhstan's inclusion in the ENP.					No	No	NONE

sources: , , ENP official page

== Statistics ==
State (18)	GNI	GDP	GNI PPP	GDP PPP	HDI	life exp.	CPI	press freedom	internet users	WTO	VWP
Algeria	3,620	4,922	7,640	6,927	0.748	72.4	3.2	45.53	10.4	obs	X
Armenia	2,640	3,400	5,900	5,436	0.777	72.1	2.9	68.97	5.8	WTO	X
Azerbaijan	2,550	6,142	6,260	8,958	0.758	67.5	1.9	39.4	18.3	obs	X
Belarus	4,220	6,058	10,740	12,344	0.817	69.0	2.0	39.62	29.0	obs	X
Egypt	1,580	2,108	5,400	5,904	0.716	71.3	2.8	30.23	12.9	WTO	X
Georgia	2,120	3,060	4,770	5,001	0.763	71.0	3.9	59.3	7.8	WTO	X
Israel	21,900	26,535	25,930	28,245	0.930	83.04	6.0	59.62	n/d	WTO	√
Jordan	2,850	3,266	5,160	5,171	0.769	72.5	5.1	48.66	n/d	WTO	X
Kazakhstan	5,060	9,075	9,700	11,563	0.807	67.2	2.2	48.28	12.4	WTO	X
Lebanon	5,770	7,375	10,050	12,063	0.796	72.0	3.0	46.58	n/d	obs	X
Libya	9,010	17,468	14,710	14,593	0.840	74.0	2.6	43.16	4.2	obs	X
Moldova	1,260	1,830	2,930	3,153	0.719	68.9	2.9	73.47	16.2	WTO	X
Morocco	2,250	2,901	3,990	4,432	0.646	71.2	3.5	45.42	19.2	WTO	X
Palestine	n/d	n/d	n/d	n/d	0.731	73.4	n/d	28.98	n/d	X	X
Russia	7,560	12,578	14,400	16,160	0.806	65.5	2.1	38.82	27.0	WTO	X
Syria	1,760	2,237	4,370	4,668	0.736	74.1	2.1	28.94	n/d	obs	X
Tunisia	4,351	4,032	9,060	9,550	0.762	73.9	4.4	58.49	27.0	WTO	X
Ukraine	2,550	4,318	6,810	7,633	0.786	67.9	2.5	55.76	14.6	WTO	X

high income ($11,456 or more) GNI (Gross National Income)
upper middle income ($3,706 to $11,455) GNI
lower middle income ($936 to $3,705) GNI
low income (less than $935) GNI

== See also ==
- Arctic policy of European Union
- Countries bordering the European Union
- Eastern Partnership
- ENPI Italy–Tunisia CBC Programme
- EUBAM
- Euronest Parliamentary Assembly
- European integration
- Eurosphere
- EU Strategy for the South Caucasus
- Northern Dimension
- Politics of Europe
- Third-country economic relationships with the European Union
- Union for the Mediterranean
