= Eastern Partnership =

EU project with Armenia, Azerbaijan, Belarus, Georgia, Moldova and Ukraine

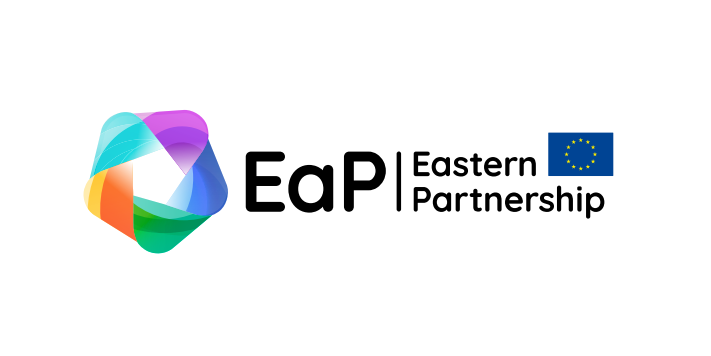

- European Union member states Non-EU members of the Eastern Partnership Suspended members
- Formation: 7 May 2009; 17 years ago
- Founded at: Prague
- Type: European External Action Service initiative
- Headquarters: Brussels, Belgium
- Location: Europe
- Members: European Union; Armenia; Azerbaijan; Belarus (suspended); Georgia; Moldova; Ukraine
- Website: Website

The Eastern Partnership (EaP) is a joint initiative of the European Union, together with its member states, and five (originally six) Eastern European countries. The EaP framework governs the EU's relationship with the post-Soviet states of Armenia, Azerbaijan, Georgia, Moldova, and Ukraine. Belarus halted its participation in the EaP in 2021.

The EaP is intended to provide a forum for discussions regarding trade, economic strategy, travel agreements, and other issues between the EU and its Eastern European neighbours. It also aims at building a common area of shared values of democracy, prosperity, stability, and increased cooperation. The project was initiated by Poland and a subsequent proposal was prepared in co-operation with Sweden. It was presented by the foreign ministers of Poland and Sweden at the EU's General Affairs and External Relations Council in Brussels on 26 May 2008. The Eastern Partnership was inaugurated by the EU in Prague, Czech Republic on 7 May 2009.

The first meeting of foreign ministers in the framework of the Eastern Partnership was held on 8 December 2009 in Brussels.

== History ==
The Eastern Partnership (EaP) was established as a specific Eastern dimension of the European Neighbourhood Policy, which contains both a bilateral and multilateral track. The Eastern Partnership complements the Northern Dimension and the Union for the Mediterranean by providing an institutionalised forum for discussing visa agreements, free trade deals, and strategic partnership agreements with the EU's eastern neighbours, while avoiding the controversial topic of accession to the European Union. Its geographical scope consists of Armenia, Azerbaijan, Belarus, Georgia, Moldova, and Ukraine. Unlike the Union for the Mediterranean, the Eastern Partnership does not have its own secretariat, but is controlled directly by the European Commission.

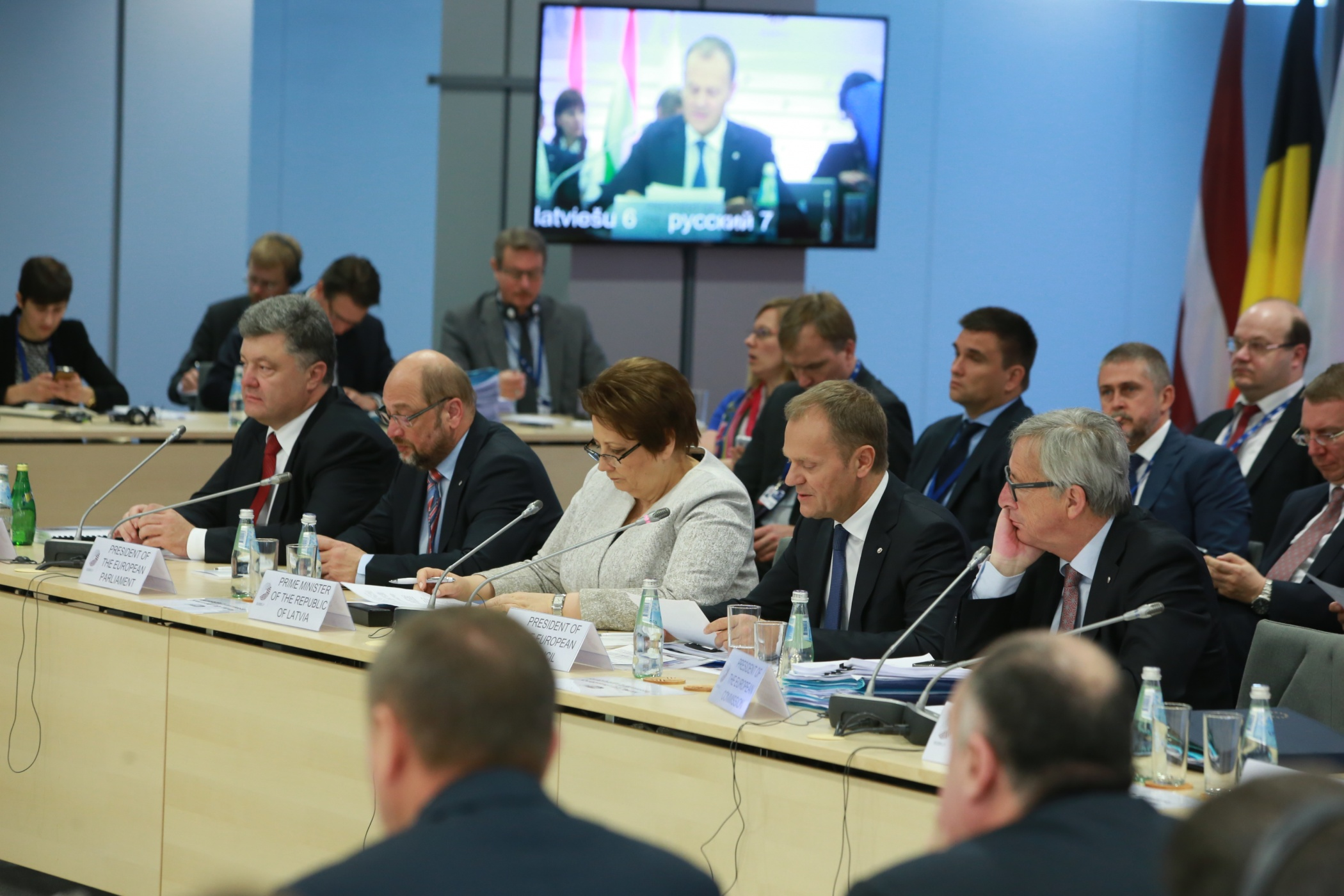
4th Eastern Partnership Summit, Riga, May 2015

In May 2008, Poland and Sweden put forward a joint proposal for an Eastern Partnership with Ukraine, Moldova, Armenia, Azerbaijan, and Georgia, with Russia and Belarus participating in some aspects. Eventually, Belarus joined the initiative as a full member, while Russia does not participate at all. The Polish foreign minister Radosław Sikorski said "We all know the EU has enlargement fatigue. We have to use this time to prepare as much as possible so that when the fatigue passes, membership becomes something natural" It was discussed at the European Council on 19 and 20 June 2008, along with the Union for the Mediterranean. The Czech Republic endorsed the proposal completely, while Bulgaria and Romania were cautious, fearing that the Black Sea Forum for Partnership and Dialogue and the Organization of the Black Sea Economic Cooperation could be undermined. Meanwhile, Germany, France, and others were not happy with the possibility that the Eastern Partnership could be seen as a stepping stone to membership (especially for Ukraine), while Poland and other Eastern states have explicitly welcomed this effect.

The Eastern Partnership was officially launched in May 2009 when the Czech Republic invited the leaders of the six members of the initiative. Meanwhile, Germany attended the summit to signal their alarm at the economic situation in the East. Russia accused the EU of trying to carve out a new sphere of influence, which the EU denied, stating that they were "responding to the demands of these countries...and the economic reality is that most of their trade is done with the EU".

== Member states ==
The Eastern Partnership consists of the following 27 EU member states and six Eastern European post-Soviet states:

EU member states

- Austria
- Belgium
- Bulgaria
- Croatia
- Cyprus
- Czech Republic
- Denmark
- Estonia
- Finland
- France
- Germany
- Greece
- Hungary
- Ireland
- Italy
- Latvia
- Lithuania
- Luxembourg
- Malta
- Netherlands
- Poland
- Portugal
- Romania
- Slovakia
- Slovenia
- Spain
- Sweden

Non-EU members

- Armenia
- Azerbaijan
- Belarus (suspended)
- Georgia (EU candidate)
- Moldova (EU candidate)
- Ukraine (EU candidate)

In addition, the above members, except Belarus, further participate in the Council of Europe and the Euronest Parliamentary Assembly in which these states forge closer political and economic ties with the European Union.

The participation of Belarus in the Eastern Partnership and their President Lukashenko, who has been described as authoritarian, at a summit in 2009 was the subject of debate. On 30 September 2011 Belarus seemingly withdrew from the initiative because of: "unprecedented discrimination" and a "substitution" of the principles on which it was built two years ago. However three days later Foreign Minister of Belarus Sergei Martynov refuted this.

On 28 June 2021, the Belarusian Ministry of Foreign Affairs confirmed that Belarus would suspend its membership in the Eastern Partnership.

== Institutions and aims ==
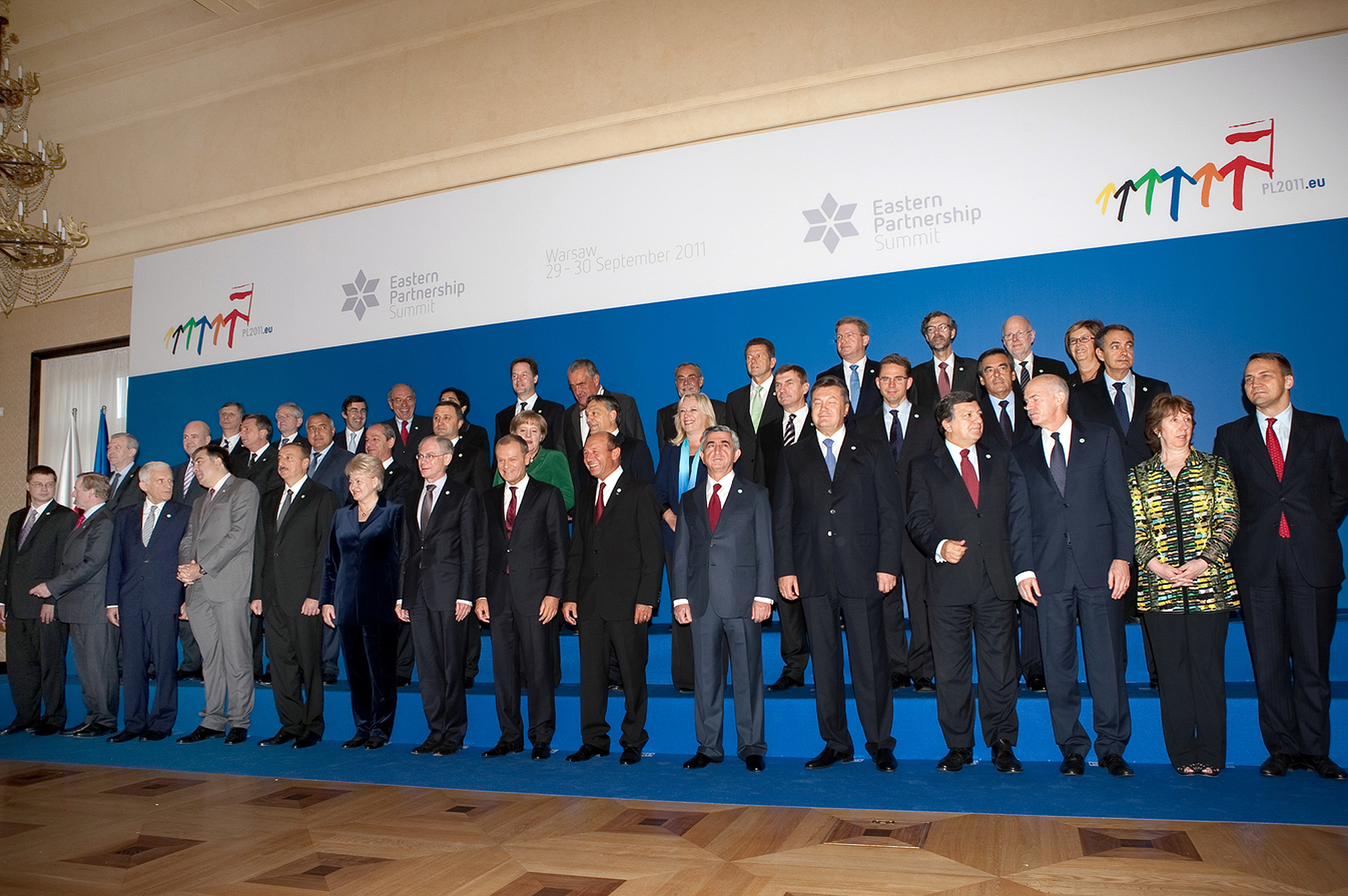
Warsaw Summit 2011

The Eastern Partnership is a forum aiming to improve the political and economic trade-relations of the six Post-Soviet states of "strategic importance" – Armenia, Azerbaijan, Belarus, Georgia, Moldova, Ukraine with the European Union. Promotion of human rights and rule of law in former Soviet states has been reported to form the "core" of the policy of the Eastern Partnership. The EU draft of the EaP states that: "Shared values including democracy, the rule of law, and respect for human rights will be at its core, as well as the principles of market economy, sustainable development and good governance." The Partnership is to provide the foundation for new Association Agreements between the EU and those partners who have made sufficient progress towards the principles and values mentioned. Apart from values, the declaration says the region is of "strategic importance" and the EU has an "interest in developing an increasingly close relationship with its Eastern partners..."

The inclusion of Belarus prompts the question whether values or geopolitics are paramount in the initiative. EU diplomats agree that the country's authoritarian president, Alexander Lukashenko, has done little to merit involvement in the policy at this stage. But the EU fears Russia will strengthen its grip on Minsk if it is left out. There are plans to model the concept on the Stabilisation and Association Process used by the EU in the Balkans, including a possible free trade area encompassing the countries in the region, similar to BAFTA or CEFTA. A future membership perspective is not ruled out, either.

== Priority areas of cooperation ==
The key focus of the EU engagement within the Eastern Partnership includes the achievement of tangible results for the citizens in the partner countries. The pursuit of tangible outcomes has resulted in 20 deliverables of Eastern Partnership cooperation for 2020. They were developed in close consultation with the stakeholders, and include the following:

- Modernised transport connections through the Trans-European Transport Network (TEN-T);
- Increased political ownership of energy efficiency;
- Easier access to finance for SMEs, including to lending in local currency;
- Establishing ways of reducing mobile telephony roaming tariffs between partners by conducting a study;
- Increased trade opportunities;
- Greater outreach to grassroots Civil Society Organizations; and,
- More support for youth.

A joint working document "Eastern Partnership – focusing on key priorities and deliverables" drafted by the Commission and EEAS details the objectives across the five priority areas of cooperation agreed at the Eastern Partnership Summit in Riga in 2015:

1. Stronger governance: Strengthening institutions and good governance
2. Stronger economy: Economic development and market opportunities
3. Better connectivity: Connectivity, energy efficiency, environment and climate change
4. Stronger society: Mobility and people-to-people contacts
5. Involvement of broader society, gender and communication

== Financing ==
The EC earmarked €600 million for the six partner countries for the period 2010–13 as part of the European Neighbourhood and Partnership Instrument, constituting about a quarter of the total funding available to the Eastern Partnership countries in that period. The programme had three main purposes: Comprehensive Institution Building programmes, aimed at supporting reforms (approximately €175 million); Pilot regional development programmes, aimed at addressing regional economic and social disparities (approximately €75 million); and Implementation of the Eastern Partnership, focusing on democracy, governance and stability, economic integration and convergence with EU policies, energy security, and contacts between people with the aim of bringing the partners closer to the EU (approximately €350 million).

In December 2010, the European Investment Bank established the ″Eastern Partnership Technical Assistance Trust Fund″ (EPTATF). It includes the ″Eastern Partnership Internship Programme″ which is open to students who are nationals of Armenia, Azerbaijan, Georgia, Moldova, or Ukraine.

In 2021, a new aid package was given to the EU's six Eastern Partnership countries, where Ukraine received €1.9 billion, Azerbaijan €140 million, and Armenia €2.6 billion. In particular, the aid package to Armenia was 62 percent more than previously promised.

== Euronest Parliamentary Assembly ==
Established in 2011 as a component of the Eastern Partnership, the Euronest Parliamentary Assembly is the inter-parliamentary forum in which members of the European Parliament and the Eastern Partnership participate and forge closer political and economic ties with the EU. The Assembly gathers once a year, meeting locations alternate between an Eastern Partnership country and one of the European Parliament places of work (Brussels, Luxembourg or Strasbourg).

Countries that could join the European Union Current members Candidate countries Applicant / potential candidate countries Membership possible Membership not possible

=== Prospect of EU membership ===
In December 2019, following the eighth Euronest Parliamentary Assembly, a resolution was passed by all members outlining various EU integration goals to be achieved by 2030. The resolution affirms that the process of EU enlargement is open to Eastern Partnership member states and that future enlargement of the EU will be mutually beneficial for both the EU and Eastern Partnership members.

In June 2020, European lawmakers called for the creation of a common economic space between the EU and the six members of the Eastern Partnership, as part of a process of gradual integration into the EU. The European Parliament passed the motion which was supported by 507 MEPs, with 119 voting against and 37 abstaining. The motion also confirmed that the Eastern Partnership policy can facilitate a process of gradual integration into the EU.

== EU-Ukraine bilateral relations ==
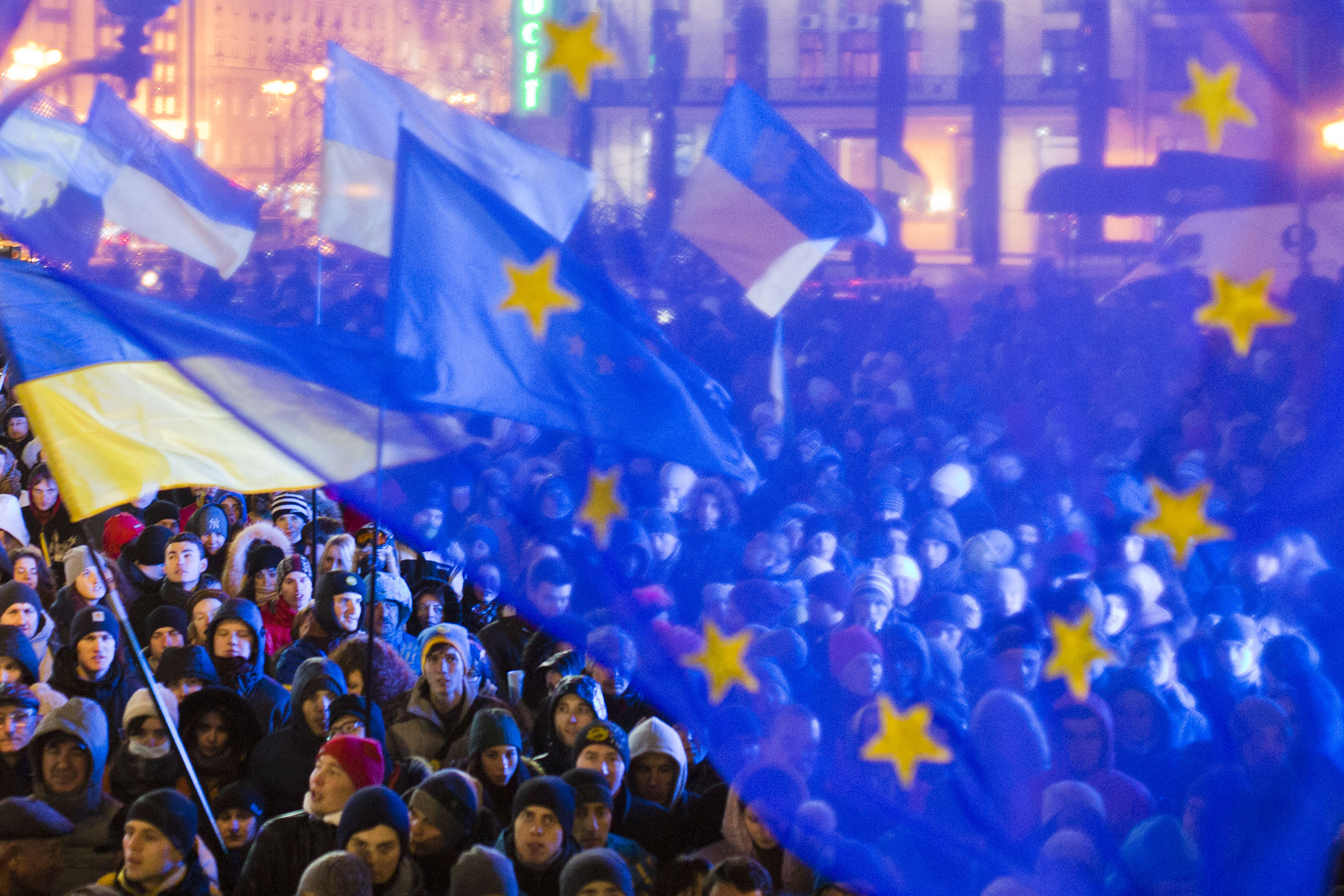
Pro-EU demonstration on 27 November 2013 in Kyiv

Ukraine is one of six post-Soviet nations to be invited to co-operate with the EU within the new multilateral framework that the Eastern partnership is expected to establish. However, Kyiv pointed out that it remains pessimistic about the "added value" of this initiative. Indeed, Ukraine and the EU have already started the negotiations on new, enhanced political and free-trade agreements (Association and Free-Trade Agreements). Also, there has been some progress in liberalising the visa regime despite persistent problems in the EU Member States' visa approach towards Ukrainians.

That is why Ukraine has a specific view of the Eastern Partnership Project. According to the Ukrainian presidency, it should correspond, in case of his country, to the strategic foreign policy objective, i.e. the integration with the EU. Yet, the Eastern Partnership documents (the European Council Declaration of May 2009) do not confirm such priorities as political and economic integration or lifting visas.

Ukraine has expressed enthusiasm about the project. Ukraine deputy premier Hryhoriy Nemyria said that the project is the way to modernise the country and that they welcome the Eastern Partnership policy, because it uses 'de facto' the same instruments as for EU candidates.

Under the Eastern Partnership, Poland and Ukraine have reached a new agreement replacing visas with simplified permits for Ukrainians residing within 30 km of the border. Up to 1.5 million people may benefit from this agreement which took effect on 1 July 2009.

== Relationship with Russia ==
Russia has expressed strong concerns over the Eastern Partnership, seeing it as an attempt to expand the European Union's "sphere of influence". Russia has also expressed concerns that the EU is putting undue pressure on Belarus by suggesting it might be marginalised if it follows Russia in recognising the independence of the Georgian breakaway regions of Abkhazia and South Ossetia. "Is this promoting democracy or is it blackmail? It's about pulling countries from the positions they want to take as sovereign states", Russian foreign minister Sergey Lavrov stated.

Sweden, the co-author of the Eastern Partnership project together with Poland, rejected Lavrov's position as "completely unacceptable". "The Eastern Partnership is not about spheres of influence. The difference is that these countries themselves opted to join", Swedish foreign minister Carl Bildt said at the Brussels Forum. The EU's position on Georgia is not 'blackmail' but "is about upholding the principles of the EU and international law, which Russia should also be respecting", he added.

In November 2009, Russian President Dmitry Medvedev dismissed the Eastern Partnership as useless: "Frankly speaking, I don't see any special use (in the program) and all the participants of this partnership are confirming this to me". However a few days later Russian Foreign Minister Sergey Lavrov said that Russia does not rule out joining the EU's Eastern Partnership programme. Russia maintained its opposition towards the EPP. For instance, after the Warsaw Summit 2011 of the EPP, Russian Prime Minister Vladimir Putin stated that due to the economic crisis in the EU, Ukraine would probably not join the EU. Instead of joining the EU, Putin offered a Russia – Ukraine relationship which he said would provide a more competitive and productive economic process.

In May 2015, President of the European Council Donald Tusk stated that Russia was "[compensating for] its shortcomings by destructive, aggressive and bullying tactics against its neighbours" while German Chancellor Angela Merkel said that "the EU makes a crystal clear difference with Russia. We accept that the different Eastern Partnership nations can go their own way and we accept these different ways." Finnish Prime Minister Alexander Stubb stated that "It is the prerogative and right of every independent and sovereign state to choose which club it wants to belong to."

== Eastern Partnership Civil Society Forum ==
Founded during the Prague Eastern Partnership Summit in 2009, the Eastern Partnership Civil Society Forum (EaP CSF) is an integral part of the Eastern Partnership program and creates a significant and institutional platform for civil society organisations to monitor and discuss the developments regarding democracy building and human rights development in the six partnership countries. The EaP CSF consists of six national platforms and five thematic working groups, which are represented by an bi-annually elected Steering Committee composed of 13 members. The Secretariat of the EaP CSF is based in Brussels. The EaP CSF General Assembly meets annually to discuss the latest developments and to set their working programme. The first meeting took place in Brussels in 2009. The last EaP Civil Society Summit meeting – which continued the tradition of its preceding Annual Assemblies - took place in Brussels in December 2025. During the meeting, 90 civil society organizations from the EaP countries and the EU adopted a resolution detailing key recommendations on the future of the EaP region and policy.

The EaP CSF aims to support the effective participation of civil society from EaP and EU countries in the process of planning, monitoring and implementing the Eastern Partnership policy. It maintains a dialogue with EU and EaP decision makers to democratically transform the EaP countries and guarantee their integration into the EU.

In 2011, the EaP CSF launched the Eastern Partnership Index, a data-driven monitoring tool used to inform policy-making. It tracks, on a biennial scale, the reform journey of the six Eastern Partnership countries towards sustainable democratic development and European integration.

The EaP CSF has actively advocated for greater political and financial support to civil society in the Eastern partnership, in light of their role in supporting democratization and rule of law reforms. It has also actively campaigned for an EU response to the human rights situation in Azerbaijan and Belarus. It also monitors the progress on the Moldovan, Ukrainian and Georgian candidacies to the EU.

As of January 2025, the EaP CSF counts over 1,200 member organizations and remains an official interlocutor of EU institutions and EaP partner countries in the EaP architecture. A similar set up is unique for the EaP region, given that no similar platform exists for the Western Balkans or the Southern Neighbourhood. The EaP CSF provides a framework for transmitting European values and norms. As a result, some scholars have attributed a socialization function to the Forum, whereby norms sponsored by the European Union are internalized by participating civil society organizations.

== Summits ==
- 1st Eastern Partnership Summit in Prague in May 2009
- 2nd Eastern Partnership Summit in Warsaw in September 2011
- 3rd Eastern Partnership Summit in Vilnius in November 2013
- 4th Eastern Partnership Summit in Riga in May 2015
- 5th Eastern Partnership Summit in Brussels in November 2017
- 6th Eastern Partnership Summit in Brussels in December 2021

== Criticism ==
Although the Eastern Partnership was inaugurated on 7 May 2009, academic research critically analysing the policy became available by early 2010 with the findings from a UK research project, funded by the Economic and Social Research Council, examining the EU's relations with three Eastern Partnership member states, Belarus, Ukraine, and Moldova notes both conceptual and empirical dilemmas. First, conceptually the EU has limited uniform awareness of what it is trying to promote in its eastern neighbourhood under the aegis of 'shared values', 'collective norms' and 'joint ownership'. Secondly, empirically, the EU seems to favour a 'top-down' governance approach (based on rule/norm transfer and conditionality) in its relations with outsiders, which is clearly at odds with a voluntary idea of 'partnership', and explicitly limits the input of 'the other' in the process of reform.

== See also ==
- Association Trio
- Community for Democracy and Rights of Nations
- Community of Democratic Choice
- Deep and Comprehensive Free Trade Area
- Eastern European Group
- Euromaidan
- Euronest Parliamentary Assembly
- Eurosphere
- Eurasian Economic Union
- European integration
- Eurovoc
- EU Strategy for the South Caucasus
- Greater Europe
- INOGATE
- Politics of Europe
- Potential enlargement of the European Union
