= ARLEM =

Euro-Mediterranean Regional and Local Assembly (ARLEM)
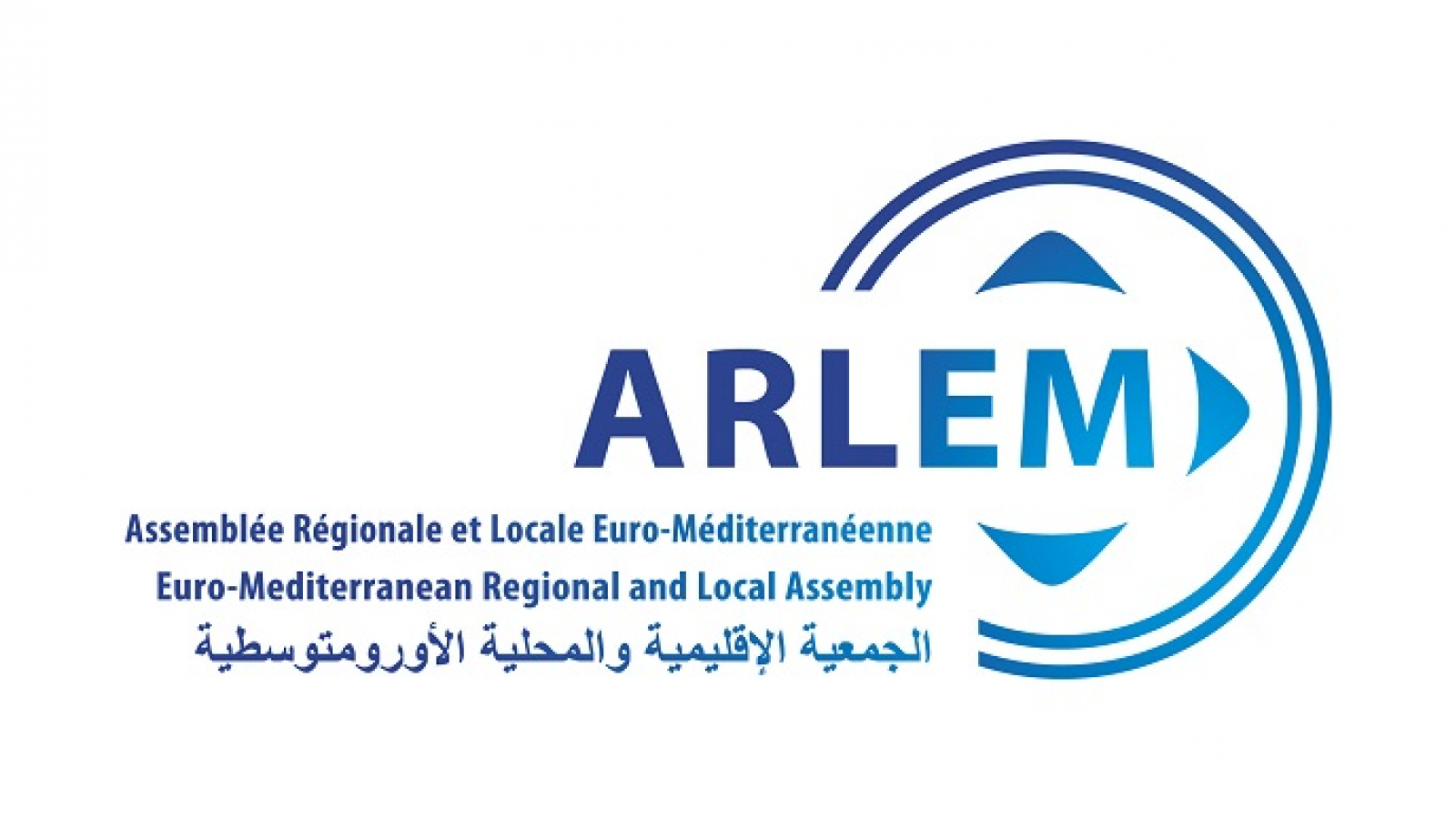
- Logo
- Secretariat: Brussels
- Type: Intergovernmental organisation
- Membership: 80 members 40 from the EU; 40 from partner nations

Establishment
  - Established: 21 January 2010
- Website https://cor.europa.eu/en/plenaries-events/15th-plenary-session-euro-mediterranean-regional-and-local-assembly-arlem

The Euro-Mediterranean Regional and Local Assembly, ARLEM (French acronym for l′Assemblée Régionale et Locale Euro-Méditerranéenne), is a permanent, joint assembly, bringing together local and regional authorities from the three shores of the Mediterranean. This assembly is designed to provide an institutional framework to bring together CoR members and representatives of European associations involved in Euro-Mediterranean co-operation with their counterparts from the Mediterranean partners in a permanent joint body.

At the inaugural session held in January 2010, mayors of major cities and representatives of regions from the European Union and the Mediterranean partner countries underlined the need to go beyond existing traditional diplomatic relations by launching concrete co-operation programmes on issues such as de-pollution of the Mediterranean; maritime and land highways; civil protection; alternative energies; higher education and research, Euro-Mediterranean university; the Mediterranean business development initiative.

== History ==
In the immediate aftermath of the establishment of the Union for the Mediterranean at the July 2008 Paris Summit, the Committee of the Regions submitted a proposal to the Heads of State and Government for the creation, in the form of a Euro-Mediterranean Regional and Local Assembly, of a territorial dimension to the partnership. This proposal was promoted and supported by partner countries.

Several associations, among which the UCLG, the Mediterranean Interregional Committee of UCLG, fostered the creation of ARLEM in January 2010 to facilitate the establishment of contacts, good practice sharing between cities and regions and the promotion of inter-municipal and inter-regional co-operation.

Members of the Euro-Mediterranean Regional and Local Assembly met for the second ARLEM plenary session in Agadir (Morocco) on 29 January 2011 where the local and regional leaders of the Mediterranean adopted three major reports on local management on water, urban development and the territorial dimension of the Union for the Mediterranean. These reports were presented to the General Secretariat of the UfM the EU institutions and other players active in Euro-Mediterranean co-operation. ARLEM also agreed to issue reports on the four following issues: renewable energy, desertification and climate change, small and medium enterprises and cultural heritage.

== Objectives ==
The objective of ARLEM is to give local and regional representatives of the Euro-Mediterranean partnership an opportunity to establish direct dialogue with the European institutions and the Union for the Mediterranean. According to the Committee of the Regions, increased involvement of local and regional authorities in this process is of vital importance, since they are closest to the people, and thus best placed to produce tangible solutions to their everyday problems.

This forum provides structured visibility and follow-up for the on-the-ground realities of relations between the EU and its Southern and Eastern Mediterranean partners in the areas of trade, economic co-operation agreements, and the promotion of job creation and cultural interface.

ARLEM is a response to the request to put the role of regional and local authorities in the Euro-Mediterranean Partnership on an institutional footing. It therefore gives the partnership a territorial dimension and seeks to involve local and regional authorities more closely in the specific projects of the Union for the Mediterranean.

== Organisation ==
The structure of ARLEM is twofold, along the lines of what was done at the national parliamentary level with the Euro-Mediterranean Parliamentary Assembly. It is composed of 80 members:

The EU delegation is composed of members of the Committee of the Regions (32) and representatives of European and international associations engaged in Euro-Mediterranean co-operation (8) (AER, AEBR, CEMR, CPMR, COPPEM, Medcities, UCLG).

The delegation of the Mediterranean partners is composed of 40 representatives of local and regional authorities appointed by the national governments.
