= Euromed Heritage programme =

The Euromed Heritage programme was a programme (1998-2013) chartered by the Barcelona Declaration and funded through the resulting Euro-Mediterranean Partnership. Its purpose was to foster regional inter-cultural dialogue between the member states of the Mediterranean, through collaboration on the preservation of cultural heritages.

Since 1995, Euromed Heritage has obtained funding and embarked upon several initiatives. As of 2010, 400 partner organizations from Mediterranean countries have benefited from funding provided by Euromed Heritage.

== Euromed Heritage I ==
Between 1998 and 2004, the programme focused largely on collecting heritage inventories and fostering networks of peoples and organizations around the Mediterranean. Other activities included the creation of an encyclopedia, sponsoring festivals, expositions, exhibits and promotions.

== Euromed Heritage II ==
Between 2002 and 2007, an initiative to improve organizational capabilities to preserve heritage was conducted. Intangible heritage was an emphasis, with several projects involving historic aspects of heritage such as historic Mediterranean coastal defense and navigation.

== Euromed Heritage III ==
Between 2004 and 2008, another initiative of the programme focused on Islamic art, as well as Islamic and Byzantine culture.

== Euromed Heritage IV ==
The emphasis of the programme from 2008 through 2012 was the appropriation of the various cultural heritages by nations' own peoples, through education and knowledge. This project also provided a framework and facilitated the development of best practices for cultural preservation. Euromed IV involved partners from the European Union and several Mediterranean partner countries, including Algeria, Egypt, Israel, Jordan, Lebanon, Morocco, the Palestinian Authority, Syria and Tunisia.

Euromed Heritage IV completed its activities on February 15, 2013. Their website remains accessible for public use. The outputs of the programme— knowledge, tools, methodologies— are available on the e-corpus digital library platform.
