= Union for the Mediterranean =

Intergovernmental organization

- Union for the Mediterranean member states Member states of the European Union Non-EU participant members Observer state
- Formation: 13 July 2008
- Headquarters: Barcelona, Spain
- Region served: Mediterranean
- Members: 43 member states: Albania; Algeria; Austria; Belgium; Bosnia and Herzegovina; Bulgaria; Croatia; Cyprus; Czech Republic; Denmark; Egypt; Estonia; Finland; France; Germany; Greece; Hungary; Ireland; Israel; Italy; Jordan; Latvia; Lebanon; Lithuania; Luxembourg; Malta; Mauritania; Monaco; Montenegro; Morocco; Netherlands; North Macedonia; Palestine; Poland; Portugal; Romania; Slovakia; Slovenia; Spain; Sweden; Syria; Tunisia; Turkey; 1 observer state: Libya
- Official language: Arabic, English, French
- Secretary General: Nasser Kamel
- Website: UfMSecretariat.org

The Union for the Mediterranean (UfM; French: Union pour la Méditerranée, Arabic: الاتحاد من أجل المتوسط Al-Ittiḥād min ajl al-Mutawasseṭ) is an intergovernmental organization of 43 member states from Europe and the Mediterranean basin: all 27 European Union member states (including those not on the Mediterranean) and 16 Mediterranean partner countries from North Africa, Southern Europe, and West Asia.

The UfM was founded on 13 July 2008 at the Paris Summit for the Mediterranean, with the aim of reinforcing the Euro-Mediterranean (Euromed) partnership set out in 1995 as the Barcelona Process. It seeks to promote stability, integration, and socioeconomic development throughout the Mediterranean region; to this end, the union identifies and supports regional projects and initiatives spanning six sectors of activity: Business Development & Employment; Higher Education & Research; Social & Civil Affairs; Energy & Climate Action; Transport & Urban Development; and Water, Environment & Blue Economy.

The UfM is governed by a co-presidency shared between the northern and southern shores of the Mediterranean; policies and activities are promulgated through regular meetings of senior officials from the foreign ministries of member states, as well as from EU institutions and the Arab League. The organization is administered by a general secretariat based in Barcelona, Catalonia, Spain, which is directed by the secretary general and supported by six deputy secretary generals (DSGs).

== Members ==
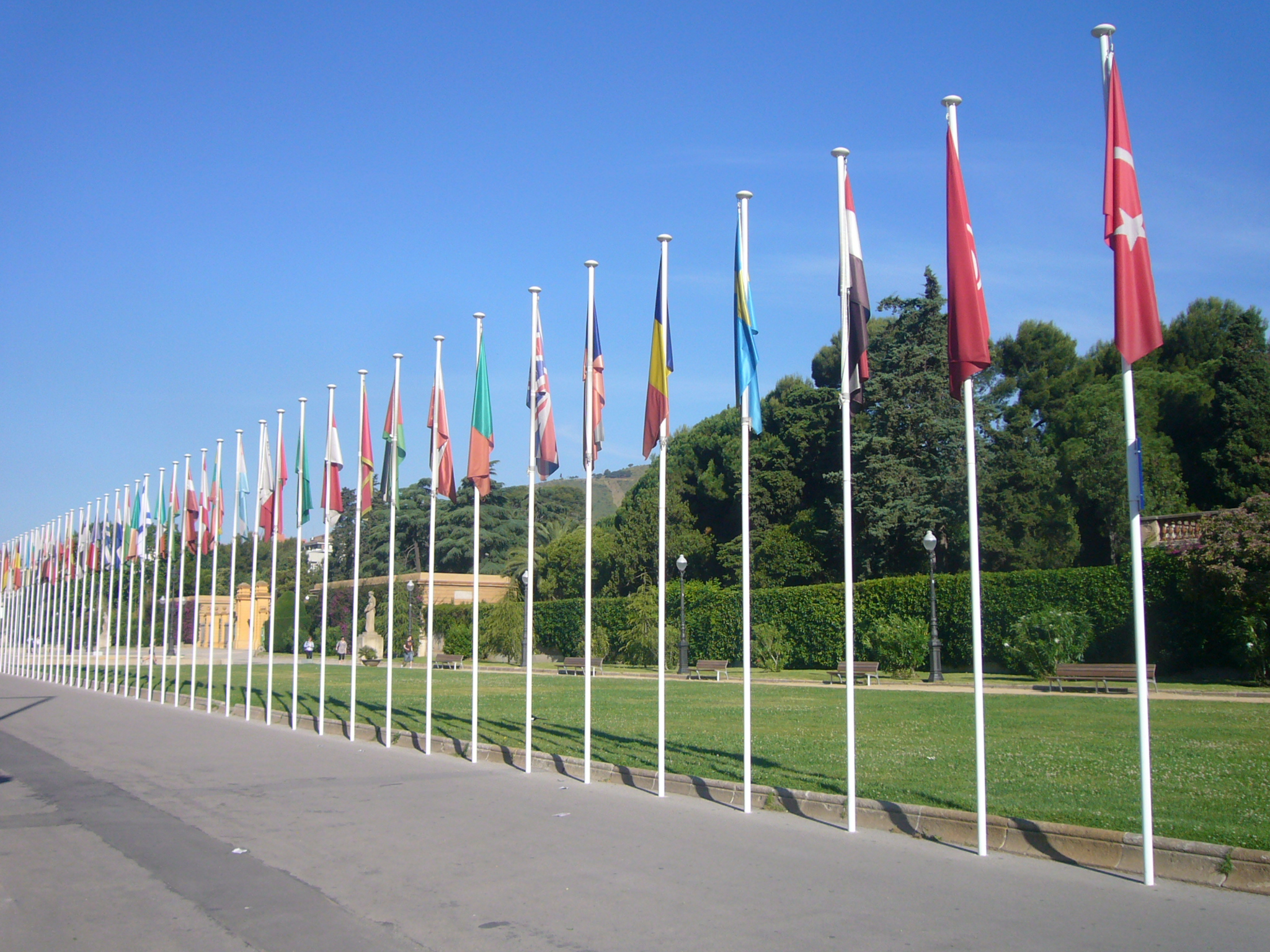
Flags of UfM members, located at the Royal Palace of Pedralbes, in Barcelona (UfM headquarters)

The 43 members of the Union for the Mediterranean are the following (those on the Mediterranean in bold) :

- From the European Union side:
  - The 27 European Union member states: Austria, Belgium, Bulgaria, **Croatia**, **Cyprus**, the Czech Republic, Denmark, Estonia, Finland, **France**, Germany, **Greece**, Hungary, Ireland, **Italy**, Latvia, Lithuania, Luxembourg, **Malta**, the Netherlands, Poland, Portugal, Romania, Slovakia, **Slovenia**, **Spain** and Sweden.
  - The European Commission.
- From the side of the Mediterranean Partner countries:
  - 16 member states: **Albania**, **Algeria**, **Bosnia and Herzegovina**, **Egypt**, **Israel**, Jordan, **Lebanon**, Mauritania, **Monaco**, **Montenegro**, North Macedonia, **Morocco**, **Palestine**, **Syria** (suspended 2011; reentered in 2025), **Tunisia** and **Turkey**.

Additionally, Libya is an observer state. The UfM has expressed a desire to grant Libya full membership, and Mohamed Abdelaziz, Libya's Foreign Minister from January 2013 to August 2014, once stated that his country is "open" to joining. The Arab League also participates in UfM meetings. (Note: The Euro-Mediterranean Ministers of Foreign Affairs gathered at Marseille in November 2008, agreed that the League of the Arab States "shall participate in all meetings at all levels" of the Union for the Mediterranean. Prior to this decision, the Arab League had been participating in Ministerial Meetings of the Euro-Mediterranean Partnership but was not allowed in the preparatory meetings.)

== History ==
=== Context ===
==== Antecedents: Barcelona Process ====
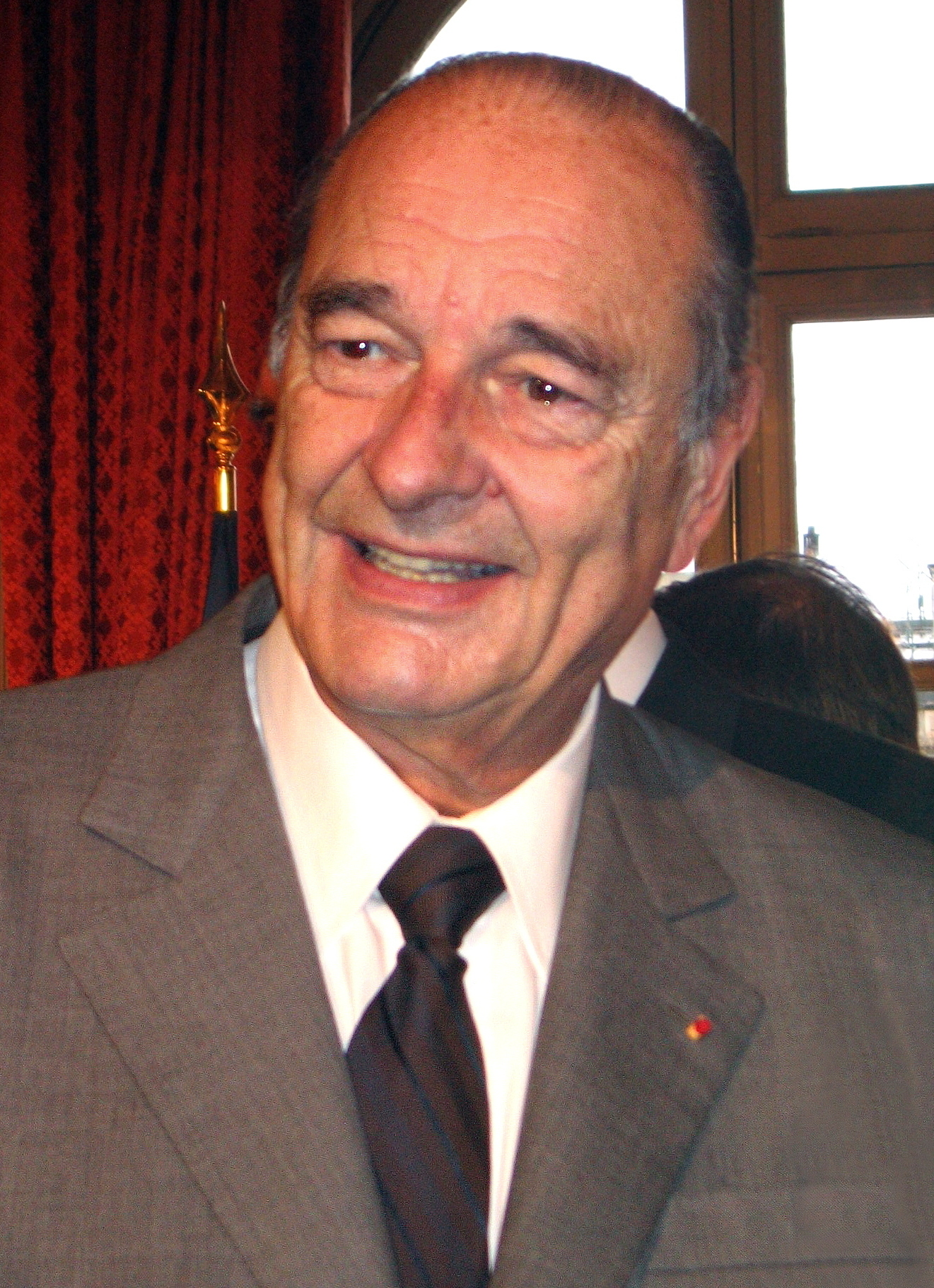
Former French President Jacques Chirac, one of the founders of the Barcelona Process

The Euro-Mediterranean Partnership, also known as the Barcelona Process, was created in 1995 as a result of the Conference of Euro-Mediterranean Ministers of Foreign Affairs held in Barcelona on 27 and 28 November under the Spanish presidency of the EU. The founding act of the Partnership in 1995 and Final Declaration of the Barcelona Euro-Mediterranean Ministerial Conference is called the Barcelona Declaration, which is often used to refer to the Process itself.

The Partnership culminated in a series of attempts by European countries to articulate their relations with their North African and Middle Eastern neighbours: the global Mediterranean policy (1972–1992) and the renovated Mediterranean policy (1992–1995).

Javier Solana opened the conference by saying that they were brought together to straighten out the "clash of civilizations" and misunderstandings that there had been between them, and that it "was auspicious" that they had convened on the 900th anniversary of the First Crusade. He described the conference as a process to foster cultural and economic unity in the Mediterranean region. The Barcelona Treaty was drawn up by the 27 countries in attendance, and Solana, who represented Spain as its foreign minister during the country's turn at the Presidency of the Council of the European Union, was credited with the diplomatic accomplishment.

According to the 1995 Barcelona Declaration, the aim of the initiative was summed up as: "turning the Mediterranean basin into an area of dialogue, exchange and cooperation guaranteeing peace, stability and prosperity". The Declaration established the three main objectives of the Partnership, called "baskets" (i.e., strands or facets):

1. Definition of a common area of peace and stability through the reinforcement of political and security dialogue (Political and Security Basket).
2. Construction of a zone of shared prosperity through an economic and financial partnership and the gradual establishment of a free-trade area (Economic and Financial Basket).
3. Rapprochement between peoples through a social, cultural and human partnership aimed at encouraging understanding between cultures and exchanges between civil societies (Social, Cultural and Human Basket).

The European Union stated the intention of the partnership was "to strengthen its relations with the countries in the Mashreq and Maghreb regions". Both Ehud Barak and Yasser Arafat praised Solana's coordination of the Barcelona Process. The Barcelona Process, developed after the Conference in successive annual meetings, is a set of goals designed to lead to a free trade area in the Mediterranean Basin by 2010.

The agenda of the Barcelona Process is:

- Security and stability in the Mediterranean;
- Agreeing on shared values and initializing a long-term process for cooperation in the Mediterranean;
- Promoting democracy, good governance and human rights;
- Achieving mutually satisfactory trading terms for the region's partners, the "region" consisting of the countries that participated;
- Establishing a complementary policy to the United States' presence in the Mediterranean.

The Barcelona Process comprises three "baskets", in EU jargon, or strands:

- economic – to work for shared prosperity in the Mediterranean Region, including the Association Agreements on the bilateral level
- political – promotion of political values, good governance and democracy
- cultural – cultural exchange and strengthening civil society

The Euro-Mediterranean free trade area (EU-MEFTA) is based on the Barcelona Process and European Neighbourhood Policy. The Agadir Agreement of 2004 is seen as its first building block.

At the time of its creation, the Euro-Mediterranean Partnership comprised 27 member countries: 15 from the European Union and 12 Mediterranean countries (Algeria, Cyprus, Egypt, Israel, Jordan, Lebanon, Malta, Morocco, Palestine, Syria, Tunisia, and Turkey). As a result of the European Union's enlargements of 2004 and 2007 the number of EU member states grew up to 27, and two of the Mediterranean partner countries—Cyprus and Malta—became part of the European Union. The EU enlargement changed the configuration of the Barcelona Process from "15+12" to "27+10". Albania and Mauritania joined the Barcelona Process in 2007, raising the number of participants to 39.

==== Euromediterranean Summit 2005 ====
The 10th anniversary Euromediterranean summit was held in Barcelona on 27–28 November 2005. Full members of the Barcelona Process were:

- 27 Member States of the European Union.
- 10 countries from the southern Mediterranean shore: Algeria, Palestine, Egypt, Israel, Jordan, Lebanon, Morocco, Syria, Tunisia, and Turkey (already part of the Euro-Mediterranean Partnership, the latter began EU accession talks on 3 October).
- Croatia, a candidate to join the EU, which began accession talks on 3 October.
- The European Parliament, the European Commission, and the Secretary General of the Council of the EU

Moreover, the Barcelona Process included 6 countries and institutions participating as permanent observers (Libya, Mauritania, the Secretary-General of the Arab League) and invited observers, such as the European Investment Bank, the Arab Maghreb Union, the Anna Lindh Foundation for the Dialogue between Cultures, the Economical and Social Committee or the Euromed Economical and Social Councils.

According to the ISN, "Palestinian President Mahmoud Abbas and Turkish Prime Minister Recep Tayyip Erdoğan were the only leaders from the Mediterranean countries to attend, while those of Israel, Jordan, Syria, Lebanon, Algeria, Morocco, Tunisia, and Egypt were not present."

From the official web site, "The new realities and challenges of the 21st century make it necessary to update the Barcelona Declaration and create a new Action Plan (based on the good results of the Valencia Action Plan), encompassing four fundamental areas":

- Peace, Security, Stability, Good Government, and Democracy.
- Sustainable Economic Development and Reform.
- Education and Cultural Exchange
- Justice, Security, Migration, and Social Integration (of Immigrants).

==== Regional aspects ====
Regional dialogue represents one of the most innovative aspects of the Partnership, covering at the same time the political, economic and cultural fields (regional co-operation). Regional co-operation has a considerable strategic impact as it deals with problems that are common to many Mediterranean Partners while it emphasises the national complementarities.

The multilateral dimension supports and complements the bilateral actions and dialogue taking place under the Association Agreements.

Since 2004 the Mediterranean Partners are also included in the European Neighbourhood Policy (ENP) and since 2007 are funded via the ENPI.

==== The Euromed Heritage Programme ====
As a result of the Euro-Mediterranean Partnership, the Euromed Heritage program was formed. This program has been active since 1998, and has been involved in programs to identify the cultural heritages of Mediterranean states, promote their preservation, and educate the peoples of partner countries about their cultural heritages.

==== Response ====
By some analysts, the process has been declared ineffective. The stalling of the Middle East Peace Process is having an impact on the Barcelona Process and is hindering progress especially in the first basket. The economic basket can be considered a success, and there have been more projects for the exchange on a cultural level and between the peoples in the riparian states. Other criticism is mainly based on the predominant role the European Union is playing. Normally it is the EU that is assessing the state of affairs, which leads to the impression that the North is dictating the South what to do. The question of an enhanced co-ownership of the process has repeatedly been brought up over the last years.

Bishara Khader argues that this ambitious European project towards its Mediterranean neighbours has to be understood in a context of optimism. On the one hand, the European Community was undergoing important changes due to the reunification of Germany after the fall of the Berlin Wall in 1989 and the beginning of the adhesion negotiations of Eastern and Central European countries. On the other, the Arab–Israeli conflict appeared to be getting closer to achieving peace after the Madrid Conference (1991) and the Oslo Accords (1992). As well, Khader states that the Gulf War of 1991, the Algerian crisis (from 1992 onwards) and the rise of Islamic fundamentalism throughout the Arab world are also important factors in Europe's new relations with the Mediterranean countries based on security concerns.

Criticism of the Barcelona Process escalated after the celebration of the 10th Anniversary of the Euro-Mediterranean Summit in Barcelona in 2005. First, the absence of Heads of State and Government from the Southern Mediterranean countries (with the exception of the Palestinian and Turkish ones) heavily contrasted with the attendance of the 27 European Union's Heads of State and Government. Second, the lack of consensus to define the term "terrorism" prevented the endorsement of a final declaration. The Palestinian Authority, Ba'athist Syria, and Algeria argued that resistance movements against foreign occupation should not be included in this definition. Nevertheless, a code of conduct on countering terrorism and a five-year work program were approved at Barcelona summit of 2005. both of which are still valid under the Union for the Mediterranean.

For many, the political context surrounding the 2005 summit – the stagnation of the Middle East Peace Process, the US-led war on Iraq, the lack of democratisation in Arab countries, and the war on terror's negative effects on freedoms and human rights, among others—proved for many the inefficiency of the Barcelona Process for fulfilling its objectives of peace, stability and prosperity. Given these circumstances, even politicians that had been engaged with the Barcelona Process since its very beginnings, like the Spanish politician Josep Borrell, expressed their disappointment about the Euro-Mediterranean Partnership and its incapacity to deliver results. Critiques from Southern Mediterranean countries blamed the Partnership's failure on Europe's lack of interest towards the Mediterranean in favour of its Eastern neighbourhood; whereas experts from the North accused Southern countries of only being interested on "their own bi-lateral relationship with the EU" while downplaying multilateral policies.

However, many European Union diplomats have defended the validity of the Barcelona Process' framework by arguing that the Euro-Mediterranean Partnership was the only forum that gathered Israelis and Arabs on equal footing), and identifying as successes the Association Agreements, the Code of Conduct on Countering Terrorism and the establishment of the Anna Lindh Foundation for the Dialogue between Cultures.

In 2006 the first proposals for improving the Partnership's efficiency, visibility and co-ownership arouse, such as establishing a co-presidency system and a permanent secretariat or nominating a "Mr./Ms. Med."

==== Mediterranean Union ====
A proposal to establish a "Mediterranean Union", which would consist principally of Mediterranean states, was part of the election campaign of Nicolas Sarkozy ahead of the 2007 French presidential election in 2007. During the campaign, Sarkozy said that the Mediterranean Union would be modelled on the European Union with a shared judicial area and common institutions. Sarkozy saw Turkish membership of the Mediterranean Union as an alternative to membership of the European Union, which he opposed, and as a forum for dialogue between Israel and its Arab neighbours.

Once elected, President Sarkozy invited all heads of state and government of the Mediterranean region to a meeting in June 2008 in Paris, with a view to laying the basis of a Mediterranean Union. The Mediterranean Union was enthusiastically supported by Egypt and Israel. Turkey strongly opposed the idea and originally refused to attend the Paris conference until it was assured that membership of the Mediterranean Union was not being proposed as an alternative to membership of the EU. Among EU member states, the proposal was supported by Italy, Spain, and Greece.

However the European Commission and Germany were more cautious about the project. The European Commission saying that while initiatives promoting regional co-operation were good, it would be better to build them upon existing structures, notable among them being the Barcelona process. German chancellor Angela Merkel said the UfM risked splitting and threatening the core of the EU. In particular she objected to the potential use of EU funds to fund a project which was only to include a small number of EU member states. When Slovenia took the EU presidency at the beginning of 2008, the then Slovenian Prime Minister Janez Janša added to the criticism by saying: "We do not need a duplication of institutions, or institutions that would compete with EU, institutions that would cover part of the EU and part of the neighbourhood."

Other criticisms of the proposal included concern about the relationship between the proposed UfM and the existing Euromediterranean Partnership (Barcelona Process), which might reduce the effectiveness of EU policies in the region and allow the southern countries to play on the rivalries to escape unpopular EU policies. There were similar economic concerns in the loss of civil society and similar human rights based policies. Duplication of policies from the EU's police and judicial area was a further worry.

At the start of 2008, Sarkozy began to modify his plans for the Mediterranean Union due to widespread opposition from other EU member states and the European Commission. At the end of February of that year, France's minister for European Affairs, Jean-Pierre Jouyet, stated that "there is no Mediterranean Union" but rather a "Union for the Mediterranean" that would only be "completing and enriching" to existing EU structures and policy in the region. Following a meeting with German Chancellor Angela Merkel it was agreed that the project would include all EU member states, not just those bordering the Mediterranean, and would be built upon the existing Barcelona process. Turkey also agreed to take part in the project following a guarantee from France that it was no longer intended as an alternative to EU membership.

The proposed creation of common institutions, and a Mediterranean Investment, which was to have been modelled on the European Investment Bank, was also dropped.

In consequence the new Union for the Mediterranean would consist of regular meeting of the entire EU with the non-member partner states, and would be backed by two co-presidents and a secretariat.

=== Launch ===
At the Paris Summit for the Mediterranean (13 July 2008), the 43 Heads of State and Government from the Euro-Mediterranean region decided to launch the Barcelona Process: Union for the Mediterranean. It was presented as a new phase Euro-Mediterranean Partnership with new members and an improved institutional architecture which aimed to "enhance multilateral relations, increase co-ownership of the process, set governance on the basis of equal footing and translate it into concrete projects, more visible to citizens. Now is the time to inject a new and continuing momentum into the Barcelona Process. More engagement and new catalysts are now needed to translate the objectives of the Barcelona Declaration into tangible results."

The Paris summit was considered a diplomatic success for Nicolas Sarkozy. The French president had managed to gather in Paris all the Heads of State and Government from the 43 Euro-Mediterranean countries, with the exception of the kings of Morocco and Jordan.

At the Euro-Mediterranean Conference of Foreign Affairs held in Marseille in November 2008, the Ministers decided to shorten the initiative's name to simply the "Union for the Mediterranean".

This meeting concluded with a new joint declaration, which completed the Paris Declaration by defining the organisational structure and the principles on which the UfM would be run. A rotating co-presidency was set up, held jointly by one EUmember country and one Mediterranean partner. France and Egypt were the first countries to hold this co-presidency. The presence of the Arab League at all meetings is written into the rules. A secretariat with a separate legal status and its own statutes was created. Its headquarters were established in Barcelona.

The fact that the Union for the Mediterranean is launched as a new phase of the Euro-Mediterranean Partnership means that the Union accepts and commits to maintain the acquis of Barcelona, the purpose of which is to promote "peace, stability and prosperity" throughout the region (Barcelona, 2). Therefore, the four chapters of cooperation developed in the framework of the Barcelona Process during thirteen years remain valid:

- Politics and Security
- Economics and Trade
- Socio-cultural
- Justice and Interior Affairs. This fourth chapter was included at the 10th Anniversary Euro-Mediterranean Summit held in Barcelona in 2005.

The objective to establish a Free Trade Area in the Euro-Mediterranean region by 2010 (and beyond), first proposed at the 1995 Barcelona Conference, was also endorsed by the Paris Summit of 2008.

In addition to these four chapters of cooperation, the 43 Ministers of Foreign Affairs gathered in Marseille in November 2008 identified six concrete projects that target specific needs of the Euro-Mediterranean regions and that will enhance the visibility of the Partnership:

- De-pollution of the Mediterranean. This broad project encompasses many initiatives that target good environmental governance, access to drinkable water, water management, pollution reduction and protection of the Mediterranean biodiversity.
- Maritime and land highways. The purpose of this project is to increase and improve the circulation of commodities and people throughout the Euro-Mediterranean region by improving its ports, and building highways and railways. Specifically, the Paris and Marseille Declarations refer to the construction of both a Trans-Maghrebi railway and highway systems, connecting Morocco, Algeria and Tunisia.
- Civil protection. The civil protection project aims at improving the prevention, preparedness and response to both natural and man-made disasters. The ultimate goal is to "bring the Mediterranean Partner Countries progressively closer to the European Civil Protection Mechanism".
- Alternative energies: Mediterranean solar plan. The goal of this project is to promote the production and use of renewable energies. More specifically, it aims at turning the Mediterranean partner countries into producers of solar energy and then circulating the resulting electricity through the Euro-Mediterranean region. In this connection the union and the industrial initiative Dii signed a Memorandum of Understanding for future collaboration in May 2012 which included developing their long-term strategies "Mediterranean Solar Plan" and "Desert Power 2050". At the signing in Marrakesh the union's Secretary General called the new partnership "a key step for the implementation of the Mediterranean Solar Plan".
- Higher education and research: Euro-Mediterranean University. In June 2008 the Euro-Mediterranean University of Slovenia was inaugurated in Piran (Slovenia), which offers graduate studies programs. The Foreign Ministers gathered at Marseille in 2008 also called for the creation of another Euro-Mediterranean University in Fes, Morocco, Euro-Mediterranean University of Morocco (Euromed-UM). The decision to go ahead with the Fes university was announced in June 2012. At the 2008 Paris summit, the 43 Heads of State and Government agreed that the goal of this project is to promote higher education and scientific research in the Mediterranean, as well as to establish in the future a "Euro-Mediterranean Higher Education, Science and Research Area".
- The Mediterranean business development initiative. The purpose of the initiative is to promote small and medium-sized enterprises from the Mediterranean partner countries by "assessing the needs of these enterprises, defining policy solutions and providing these entities with resources in the form of technical assistance and financial instruments".

==== 2008–2010: First years ====
A summit of heads of state and government is intended to be held every two years to foster political dialogue at the highest level. According to the Paris Declaration:

- these summits should produce a joint declaration addressing the situation and challenges of the Euro-Mediterranean region, assessing the works of the Partnership and approving a two-year work program;
- Ministers of Foreign Affairs should meet annually to monitor the implementation of the summit declaration and to prepare the agenda of subsequent summits; and
- the host country of the summits would be chosen upon consensus and should alternate between EU and Mediterranean countries.

The first summit was held in Paris in July 2008. The second summit should have taken place in a non-EU country in July 2010 but the Euro-Mediterranean countries agreed to hold the summit in Barcelona on 7 June 2010, under the Spanish presidency of the EU, instead. However, on 20 May the Egyptian and French co-presidency along with Spain decided to postpone the summit, in a move which they described as being intended to give more time to the indirect talks between Israel and the Palestinian Authority that had started that month. In contrast, the Spanish media blamed the postponement on the Arab threat to boycott the summit if Avigdor Lieberman, Israel's Minister of Foreign Affairs, attended the Foreign Affairs conference prior to the summit.

At the time of the Paris summit, France—which was in charge of the EU presidency—and Egypt held the co-presidency. Since then, France had been signing agreements with the different rotator presidencies of the EU (the Czech Republic, Sweden and Spain) in order to maintain the co-presidency for alongside Egypt. The renewal of the co-presidency was supposed to happen on the second Union for the Mediterranean Summit. However, due to the two postponements of the summit, there has been no chance to decide which countries will take over the co-presidency.

The conflict between Turkey and Cyprus has been responsible for the delay in the endorsement of the statutes of the Secretariat, which were only approved in March 2010 even though the Marseille declaration set May 2009 as the deadline for the Secretariat to start functioning. At the Paris summit, the Heads of State and Government agreed to establish five Deputy Secretaries General from Greece, Israel, Italy, Malta and the Palestinian Authority. Turkey's desire to have a Deputy Secretary General and Cyprus' rejection of it, resulted in months of negotiation until Cyprus finally approved the creation of a sixth Deputy Secreaty General post assigned to a Turkish citizen.

Due to its seriousness, the Arab-Israeli conflict is the one that most deeply affects the Union for the Mediterranean. As a result of an armed conflict between Israel and Gaza from December 2008 to January 2009, the Arab Group refused to meet at high level, thus blocking all the ministerial meetings scheduled for the first half of 2009. As well, the refusal of the Arab Ministers of Foreign Affairs to meet with their Israeli counterpart, Avigdor Lieberman, resulted in the cancellation of two ministerial meetings on Foreign Affairs in November 2009 and June 2010. Sectorial meetings of the Union for the Mediterranean have also been affected by Israel's handling of the Palestinian civilian population under its control. At the Euro-Mediterranean ministerial meeting on Water, held in Barcelona in April 2010, the Water Strategy was not approved due to a terminological disagreement of whether to refer to territories claimed by Palestinians, Syrians and Lebanese as "occupied territories" or "territories under occupation". Two other ministerial meetings, on higher education and agriculture, had to be cancelled because of the same discrepancy.

After the initial postponement, both France and Spain announced their intentions to hold peace talks between Israel and the Palestinian Authority as part of the postponed summit under the auspices of the US. In September, U.S. President Barack Obama was invited to the summit for this purpose. The summit which was then scheduled to take place in Barcelona on 21 November 2010, was, according to Nicolas Sarkozy, "an occasion to support the negotiations".

Nevertheless, at the beginning of November 2010 the peace talks stalled, and the Egyptian co-presidents conditioned the occurrence of the summit on a gesture from Israel that would allow the negotiations to resume. According to some experts Benjamin Netanyahu's announcement of the construction of 300 new housing units in East Jerusalem ended all the possibilities of celebrating the summit on 21 November. The two co-presidencies and Spain decided on 15 November to postpone the summit sine die, alleging that the stagnation of the Middle East Peace Process would hinder a "satisfactory participation".

Having been slowed down by the financial and political situation in 2009, the UfM was given a decisive push in March 2010 with the conclusion of the negotiations on the set-up of its General Secretariat and the official inauguration of the same on 4 March 2010 in Barcelona, in the specially refurbished Palau de Pedralbes.

The European Union Ambassador to Morocco, Eneko Landaburu, stated in September 2010 that he does "not believe" in the Union for the Mediterranean. According to him, the division among the Arabs "does not allow to implement a strong inter-regional policy", and calls to leave this ambitious project of 43 countries behind and focus on bilateral relations.

==== Since 2011 ====
On 22 June 2011, the UfM labelled its first project, the creation of a seawater desalination plant in Gaza. In 2012, the UfM had a total of 13 projects labelled by the 43 countries in the sectorial areas of transport, education, water and development companies.

In 2013, the Union for the Mediterranean launches its first projects:

- 30 April: Young women as job creators
- 28 May: Governance & Financing Water in the Mediterranean area
- 17 June: LogismedTA (Training Activities under the Programme on the Development of a Network of Euro-Mediterranean Logistics Platforms)

Between 2013 and 2018, thirteen sectorial ministerial meetings took place, in presence of the ministers of the UfM Member States:

- UfM Ministerial on Strengthening the role of women in society – September 2013
- UfM Ministerial on Transport – November 2013
- UfM Ministerial on Energy – December 2013
- UfM Ministerial on Industrial cooperation – February 2014
- UfM Ministerial on Environment and climate change – May 2014
- UfM Ministerial on Digital Economy – September 2014
- UfM Ministerial on Blue Economy – November 2015
- UfM Ministerial on Regional Cooperation and Planning – June 2016
- UfM Ministerial on Employment and Labour – September 2016
- UfM Ministerial on Energy – December 2016
- UfM Ministerial on Water – April 2017
- UfM Ministerial on Urban Development – May 2017
- UfM Ministerial on Strengthening the Role of Women in Society – November 2017
- UfM Ministerial Conference on Trade – 19 March 2018

In 2015, the UfM had a total of 37 labelled projects 19 of which were in the implementation phase.[AP2] On 18 November 2015, the review of the European Neighbourhood Policy (ENP), published by the European External Action Service and the commission and confirmed by the European Council ON 14 December, positions the UfM as a driving force for integration and regional cooperation.

On 26 November 2015, on the occasion of the 20th anniversary of the Barcelona Declaration, at the initiative of the co-presidents of the UfM, Ms. Federica Mogherini, Vice-President of the European Commission and High Representative of the European Union for the Common Foreign and Security Policy, and Mr. Nasser Judeh, Minister of Foreign Affairs of the Kingdom of Jordan, held an informal meeting of Ministers of Foreign Affairs of the countries of the UfM in Barcelona to renew their political commitment to the development of regional cooperation in the framework of the UfM.

On 14 December 2015 the United Nations General Assembly adopted Resolution A / 70/124 granting observer status to the Union for the Mediterranean.

In February 2016, the UfM-labelled project "Skills for Success" successfully ended its training activities in Jordan and Morocco with high percentages of job placements. The job placement percentage among the total number of job seekers in Jordan and Morocco (115 graduates) is estimated at 49% and 6% of the participants were placed in internships.

On 12 March 2016, the UfM was awarded the prestigious Badge of Honor from Agrupación Española de Fomento Europeo (AEFE) in recognition of the value of its work for the Universal Values and Human Rights in the Mediterranean region.

On 2 June 2016, the UfM held its first Union for the Mediterranean Ministerial Meeting for Regional Cooperation and Planning, at the invitation of EU Commissioner Johannes Hahn and Imad N. Fakhoury, Jordanian Minister of Cooperation and Planning.

Ministers recognised the need to boost economic integration among the countries in the region as one of the means to create opportunities for the necessary inclusive growth and job creation. They highlighted the crucial role of the Union for the Mediterranean to that effect, welcoming the work of the UfM Secretariat to help facilitate progress in regional cooperation and integration, including by promoting region-wide projects.

On 18–19 July 2016, the UfM actively participated to the MedCOP Climate 2016, as institutional partner of the Tangier region. MedCOP Climate 2016 provided a forum to present various initiatives and projects supported by the UfM that are helping to formulate a Mediterranean climate agenda, such as the creation of a Mediterranean network of young people working on climate issues; the Regional Committee for Cooperation on Climate Finance, to make funding for climate projects in the region more efficient; and the launch of the UfM Energy University by Schneider Electric.

On 10–11 October 2016, the UfM Secretariat organized in Barcelona the Third High-Level Conference on Women Empowerment, which followed the 2014 and 2015 editions and in preparation of the Fourth UfM Ministerial Conference on Strengthening the Role of Women in Society, due to take place late 2017. The Conference provided a regional dialogue forum where the 250 participants from more than 30 countries stressed the need to invest in the essential contribution of women as a response to the current Mediterranean challenges. A report was prepared following the request formulated by the UfM Paris Ministerial Declaration on Strengthening the role of women in society. The request was "to establish an effective follow-up mechanism as a Euro-Mediterranean forum and to ensure an effective dialogue on women-related policies, legislation and implementation".

On 1 November 2016, the UfM officially launched the "Integrated Programme for the Protection of Lake Bizerte against Pollution" in Bizerte. Tunisia. The event was held in the presence of Youssef Chahed, Head of Government of Tunisia, Federica Mogherini, High Representative of the European Union for Foreign Affairs and Security Policy and Vice-President of the European Commission, and Fathallah Sijilmassi, Secretary General of the Union for the Mediterranean. With a total budget of more than €90 million over a 5-year period, the programme will contribute towards cleaning up Lake Bizerte in northern Tunisia, improving the living conditions of the surrounding populations and reducing the main sources of pollution impacting the entire Mediterranean Sea. The project is supported by International financing institutions, such as the European Investment Bank and the European Commission, as well as the European Bank for Reconstruction and Development.

In November 2016, the UfM Secretariat officially became observer to the United Nations Framework Convention on Climate Change (UNFCCC) during the COP22, while actively participating through the launch of specific regional initiatives and projects aimed at helping achieve the Paris Agreement targets in the Euro-Mediterranean region.

On 23 January 2017, the Union for the Mediterranean's Member States gave a strong political commitment to strengthen regional cooperation in the Mediterranean by endorsing the UfM roadmap for action at the second Regional Forum of the UfM, which took place in Barcelona on 23–24 January 2017 under the theme of "Mediterranean in Action: Youth for Stability and Development".

This Roadmap focuses on the following four areas of action:

- Enhancing political dialogue amongst the UfM members;
- Ensuring the contribution of UfM activities to regional stability and human development;
- Strengthening regional integration;
- Consolidating UfM capacity for action.

On 22 February 2017, the Secretariat of the Union for the Mediterranean (UfM) and the Swedish International Development Agency (Sida) signed a €6.5 million multi annual financial agreement to support UfM activities in favour of a more sustainable and inclusive development in the region.

On 10 April 2017, the Heads of State or Government of Cyprus, France, Greece, Italy, Malta, Portugal and Spain convened in Madrid at the 3rd Summit of Southern European Union Countries, where they reaffirmed their support to the Union for the Mediterranean and stressed its "central role in the consolidation of Euro-Mediterranean regional cooperation, as an expression of co-ownership in the management of our common regional agenda in order to effectively and collectively address our current challenges".

In 2017, 51 regional cooperation projects, worth over €5.3 billion, have been accorded the UfM label, through the unanimous support of the 43 Member States. Implementation of the projects is accelerating and is producing positive results on the ground.

27 November 2017 Ministers from the 43 Member countries of UfM gathered in Cairo at the 4th UfM Ministerial Conference on "Strengthening the Role of Women in Society" to agree on a common agenda to strengthen the role of women in the Euro-Mediterranean region.

On 29 November 2017, the UfM Regional Stakeholder Conference on the Blue Economy, brought together over 400 key stakeholders dealing with marine and maritime issues from the entire region, including government representatives, regional and local authorities, international organisations, academia, the private sector and civil society.

On 20 March 2018, the European Commission and the Government of Palestine, in partnership with the Union for the Mediterranean, hosted an international donor Pledging Conference to consolidate financial support to the construction of a large-scale desalination plant and its associated water supply infrastructure in the Gaza Strip.

On 13 July 2018, the UfM celebrated its 10th anniversary, with 51 regional cooperation projects labelled, 12 regional policy platforms created and over 300 expert fora organised.

== Aims and concrete projects ==
The UfM's goal is to enhance regional cooperation, dialogue and the implementation of concrete projects and initiatives with tangible impact on our citizens. The UfM has consolidated an action-driven methodology, with a common ambition of creating effective links between the policy dimension and its operational translation into concrete projects and initiatives on the ground to adequately address the challenges of the region and its key interrelated priorities. This methodology is composed of three components: Policy framework, dialogue Platforms and regional Projects – namely the "Three Ps".

=== Policy Framework ===
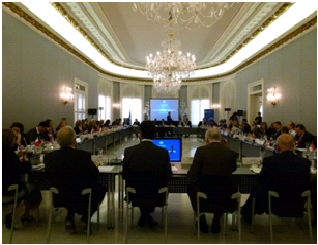

The UfM complements the bilateral work of the European Neighbourhood Policy set up in 2004 and the development policies of UfM member states, driving the emergence of a shared Mediterranean agenda to achieve an impact, not just on the situation of one country, but on regional integration as a whole.

With 43 members, the UfM acts as a central platform for setting regional priorities and sharing experiences of the principal challenges that the region faces.

The UfM Secretariat implements decisions taken at political level through regional and sub-regional sectorial dialogues fora and follow-up activities thereby following through on Ministerial commitments and promoting initiatives to foster regional cooperation.

The work to achieve this goal is carried out in conjunction with other organisations and regional cooperation forums (The Arab League, the Arab Maghreb Union) and alongside sub-regional cooperation fora such as the 5+5 Dialogue with which the UfM is actively associated.

Structured regional dialogues fora have involved over 20,000 stakeholders from around the Mediterranean, including parliamentarians and representatives of international organisations, NGOs, civil society organisations, international financial institutions, development agencies, industry and the private sector, universities as well as think tanks.

In March 2015, the Inter-parliamentary Conference for the Common Foreign and Security Policy and the Common Security and Defence Policy, in its final conclusions, described the UfM as "the most efficient and multifaceted cooperation forum in the region".

In May 2016, the Parliamentary Assembly of the UfM recognized, in the final declaration of its 12th Plenary Session, the "importance of the pivotal role played by the UfM in promoting cooperation and regional integration in the Mediterranean […]".

In January 2017, at the occasion of the second UfM Regional Forum gathering the Ministers of Foreign Affairs of the 43 Member States, Ms. Federica Mogherini, High Representative of the European Union for Foreign Affairs and Security Policy and Vice-President of the European Commission, declared: "we have committed together to break this circle of lack of integration and tensions and conflictuality and invest in a coherent manner on more political dialogue and more regional integrational cooperation on very concrete fields of actions through our Union for the Mediterranean."

The third Union for the Mediterranean (UfM) Regional Forum was held in Barcelona on 8 October 2018 under the title '10 years: Building together the future of regional cooperation'. Consolidated as the annual gathering of the Ministers of Foreign Affairs of UfM Member States, the Forum provided the occasion to draw up a state-of-play of regional cooperation in the Euro-Mediterranean area and its prospects, as well as to spotlight where the UfM needs to redouble its efforts to meet current and future challenges. Ministers took stock of the implementation of the UfM Roadmap endorsed a year ago and committed to amplifying the impetus given to the Euro-Mediterranean partnership. This third edition of the Regional Forum was chaired by the UfM Co-Presidency, assumed by Federica Mogherini, EU High Representative for Foreign Affairs and Security Policy and Vice-President of the European Commission, and Ayman Safadi, Minister of Foreign Affairs of Jordan, and hosted by Josep Borrell, Minister of Foreign Affairs of Spain and Nasser Kamel, the UfM Secretary General.

=== Regional projects ===
Via the process of ‘’labelisation,’’ the UFM supports projects that address common regional challenges that are likely to have a direct impact on the lives of citizens. The UfM label guarantees regional recognition and visibility for the selected projects. It also gives them access to funding opportunities through the network of financial partners of the UfM.

The main added value of the UfM lies in the interrelation created between the policy dimension and its operational translation into concrete projects on the ground, which in return nourishes the definition of relevant policies through a multi-stakeholder approach. The adoption of projects on the ground follows the principle of "variable geometry", providing a degree of flexibility by which a smaller number of countries may decide, with the approval of all, to cooperate and participate in projects of common interest.

In December 2015, 37 projects were labeled by the UfM. As of June 2018, more than 50 projects were labeled by the UfM.

==== Human Development ====
After a consultation process with stakeholders, the UfM launched in 2013 a regional initiative (Med4Jobs) that defines the priorities of intervention in terms of employability, intermediary services and job creation in the region, under which specific projects are developed.

By 2015, the secretariat of the UfM had labeled 13 projects addressing the challenges of youth employability and inclusive growth. Framed by the political mandate and the priorities expressed in regional dialogues, these projects target 200,000 beneficiaries, mostly young people, and involve over 1,000 small and medium private enterprises.

On Women empowerment, it had also labeled 10 projects benefiting over 50,000 women in the Euro-Mediterranean region, this with the participation of over 1000 shareholders and with a budget of over 127 million euros.

The specific focus on Youth employability and Women empowerment is in line with the UfM's aim at reinforcing human capital in the region, which is the key issue for stability and security in the region.

As of June 2018, the UfM has 28 labelled projects addressing the regional Human Development pillar.

===== Economic Development and Employment =====
- Developing Youth Employability & Entrepreneurial Skills – Maharat MED
- Mediterranean Entrepreneurship Network
- Promoting Financial Inclusion via Mobile Financial Services in the Southern and Eastern Mediterranean Countries
- Establishment of a Regional Platform for the Development of Cultural and Creative Industries and Clusters in the Southern Mediterranean
- Generation Entrepreneur
- EDILE – Economic Development through Inclusive and Local Empowerment
- EMIPO – EUROMED Invest Promotion & Observatory
- EMDC – Euro-Mediterranean Development Center for Micro, Small and Medium Enterprises
- Agadir SME Programme – Fostering SME competitiveness and trade in the Agadir Agreement member countries
- YouMatch – "Toolbox Project": Elaboration and implementation of a demand-driven toolbox for youth-orientated, innovative labour market services in the MENA region
- Organization and Coordination of the SIEMed Network: Support for Entrepreneurship Initiatives in the Mediterranean
- INCORPORA, A Labour Integration Program

===== Higher Education & Research =====
- MedNC – New Chance Mediterranean Network
- HOMERe – High Opportunity for Mediterranean Executive Recruitment
- Higher Education on Food Security and Rural Development
- EMUNI Master Programmes
- Three areas of EMUNI PhD Research Programmes
- Master Study Programme in Risk Science
- The Euro-Mediterranean University of Fes
- Eastern Mediterranean International School (EMIS)

===== Social & Civil Affairs =====
- WOMED: the "next generation of leaders"
- CEED GROW: Growing and Scaling Small and Medium-Sized Businesses
- Forming Responsible Citizens – Promoting citizenship education to prevent school violence, particularly against girls and women
- Developing Women Empowerment
- Skills for Success – Employability Skills for Women
- Young Women as Job Creators
- Promoting women empowerment for inclusive and sustainable industrial development in the MENA region
- Women's Right to Health – The WoRTH Project

==== Sustainable development ====
By 2015, 14 projects were labelled by the 43 countries of the UfM, included the cleanup of Lake Bizerte in Tunisia, the construction of the desalination plant in Gaza, and the integrated urban development of the city of Imbaba.

As of June 2018, the UfM has 23 labelled projects addressing the regional Sustainable Development pillar. These projects are expected to have an important socio-economic impact across the region, including on climate action, renewable energy, transport, urban development, water, the blue economy and environment.

===== Transport & Urban Development =====
- UPFI Sfax Taparura Project
- Bouregreg Valley Development
- Imbaba Urban Upgrading Project
- Jordanian Railway Network
- Completion of the Central Section of the Trans-Maghreb Motorway Axis
- LOGISMED Training Activities
- Motorway of the Sea (MoS) Turkey-Italy-Tunisia Project
- MoS OPTIMED IMPLEMENTATION – Towards a new Mediterranean Corridor: from South-Eastern to North-Western ports
- UPFI Multi-Site Urban Regeneration Project in Jericho
- İzmir Urban Integrated Waste Management Project
- TranslogMED, capacity building activities in logistics chain

===== Energy & Climate Action =====
- Tafila Wind Farm
- UfM Energy University by Schneider Electric
- SEMed Private Renewable Energy Framework - SPREF

===== Water, Environment & Blue Economy =====
- Capacity Building Programme on Water Integrity in the Middle East and North Africa
- BlueGreen Med-CS
- MED RESCP – POST RIO +20: Supporting the adoption of Sustainable Consumption and Production (SCP) and Resource Efficiencu (RE) models in the Mediterranean region
- Towards a Mediterranean Water Knowledge Platform
- Integrated Programme for Protection of the Lake Bizerte against Pollution
- Governance & Financing for the Mediterranean Water Sector
- The "Desalination Facility for the Gaza Strip" Project
- PLASTIC-BUSTERS for a Mediterranean free from litter
- MedCoast4BG – Med Coasts for Blue Growth

== Results ==
European Union free trade agreements currently exist with Egypt, Algeria, Tunisia, and Turkey, but the proposed union-wide free trade area has not been created. In 2020, Haizam Amirah-Fernandez criticized European countries for conducting foreign policy based on their perceived security interests, saying it caused them to work with autocratic regimes rather than push for democracy. He pointed out that since its creation 25 years earlier, only one member country, Tunisia, has become democratic, and he argued that was despite and not because of European powers.

== Institutions ==
In contrast with the Barcelona Process, one of the biggest innovations of the Union for the Mediterranean is its institutional architecture. It was decided at the Paris Summit to provide the Union with a whole set of institutions in order to up-grade the political level of its relations, promote a further co-ownership of the initiative among the EU and Mediterranean partner countries and improve the Euro-Mediterranean Partnership's visibility.

=== North and South Co-presidency system ===
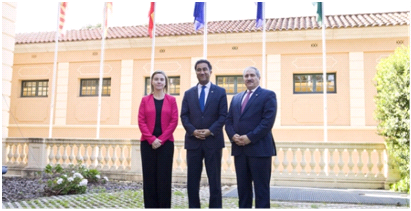
Co-presidents of the UfM, Federica Mogherini, High Representative of the European Union for Foreign Affairs and Security Policy, and Nasser Judeh, Jordan's minister of foreign affairs, next to former Secretary General of the UfM, M. Fathallah Sijilmassi

With the purpose of guaranteeing the co-ownership of the Union for the Mediterranean, the Heads of State and Government decided in Paris that two countries, one from the EU and one from the Mediterranean partner countries, will jointly preside the Union for the Mediterranean. The 27 agreed that the EU co-presidency had to "be compatible with the external representation of the European Union in accordance with the Treaty provisions in force". "The Mediterranean partner countries decided to choose by consensus and among themselves a country to hold the co-presidency for a non-renewable period of two years."

From 2008 to 2012, France & Egypt assumed the UfM's first co-presidency.

In 2012 the secretariat announced that the co-presidency of Egypt would be succeeded by Jordan, and that of France by the European Union. The change which, took place in September 2012 was decided at a meeting of the high representatives in Barcelona on 28 June.

Northern Presidency	Southern Presidency
France (July 2008 – March 2012)	Egypt (July 2008 – June 2012)
European Union (March 2012 –)	Jordan (June 2012 –)

=== Meeting of UfM Senior Officials ===
The meeting of UfM Senior Officials, composed of ambassadors and senior Foreign Affairs officials appointed individually by the 43 countries of the UfM, is held several times a year, at regular intervals, at the seat of the Secretariat of UfM in Barcelona or in one of the UfM countries. Its role is to discuss regional issues, guide policies and actions of the organization and to label the projects submitted to it. Each country has an equal vote and all decisions are made by consensus. Alongside these meetings, other UfM meetings take place, especially ministerial meetings that define the Mediterranean agenda on specific issues, such as environment and climate change, the digital economy, the role of women in society, transportation or industry.

=== Secretariat ===
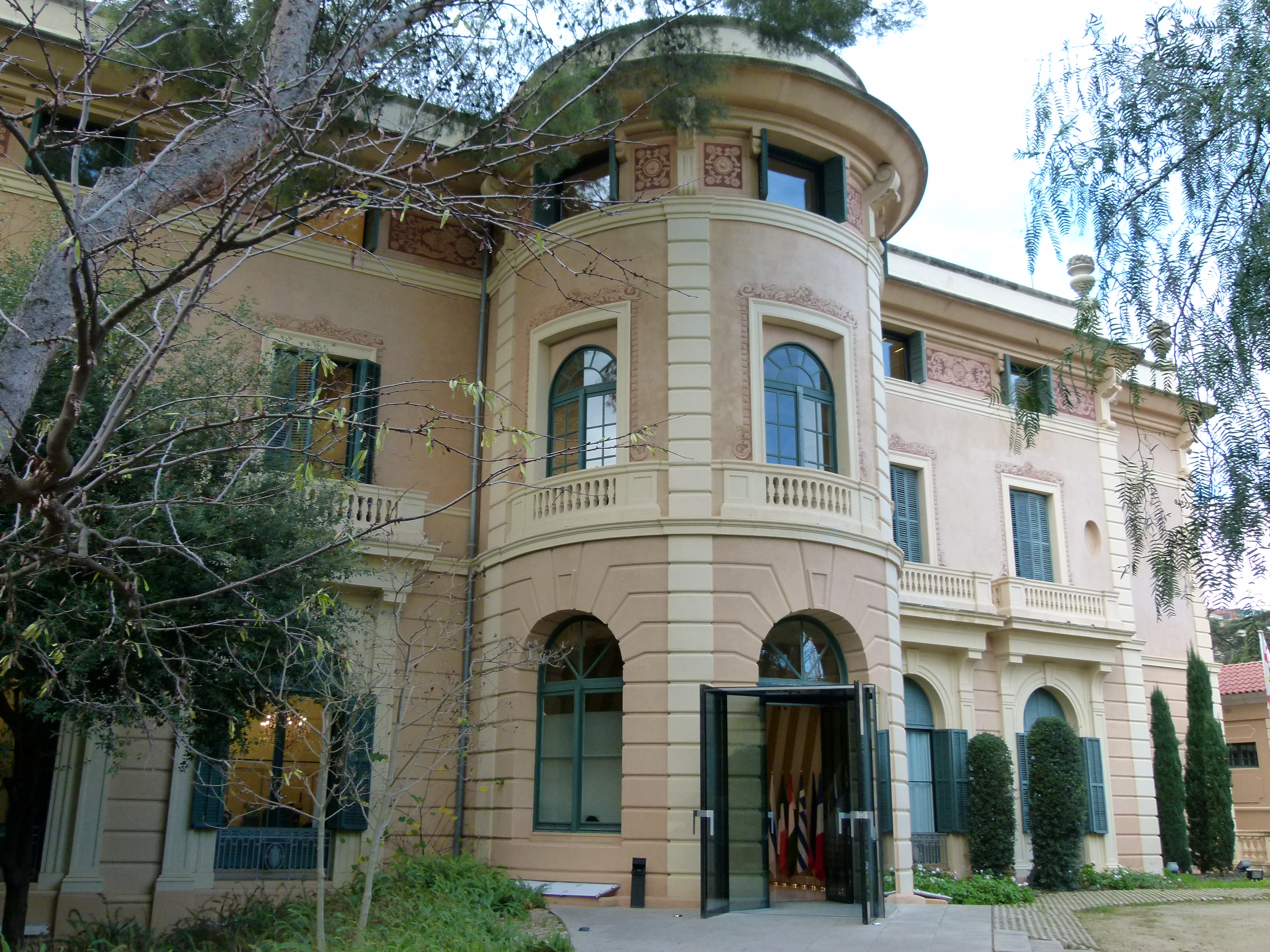
Headquarters of the Union for the Mediterranean

The Secretariat of the Union for the Mediterranean was inaugurated on 4 March 2010 in an official ceremony in Barcelona.

The task of the permanent Secretariat is to provide operational follow-up of the sectorial ministerial meeting, identifying and monitoring the implementation of concrete projects for the Euro-Mediterranean region, and searching for partners to finance these projects and coordinating various platforms for dialogue.

The Euro-Mediterranean Ministers of Foreign Affairs decided at the Marseille conference of November 2008 that the headquarters of the Secretariat would be at the Royal Palace of Pedralbes in Barcelona. They also agreed on the structure of this new key institution and the countries of origin of its first members:

- The Secretary General is elected by consensus from a non-EU country. His term is for three years, which may be extended for another three. The first Secretary General was the Jordanian Ahmad Khalaf Masa'deh, the former Ambassador of Jordan to the EU, Belgium, Norway and Luxembourg, and Minister of Public Sector Reform from 2004 to 2005. He resigned after one year in office. In July 2011, the Moroccan diplomat Youssef Amrani takes office. When he is named deputy foreign minister by the Benkirane government, he was replaced as Secretary General by fellow Moroccan Ambassador Fathallah Sijilmassi until February 2018. In June 2018, Egyptian Ambassador Nasser Kamel took office as Secretary General of the UfM, bringing more than three decades of experience in Euro-Mediterranean relations to the role.
- In order to enhance the co-ownership of the Euro-Mediterranean Partnership, six posts of Deputy Secretaries General were assigned to three countries from the EU and three from the Mediterranean partner countries. For the first term of three years (extendible to another three) the Deputy Secretaries General were:
  - Panagiotis Roumeliotis (Greece) – Energy Division;
  - Ilan Chet (Israel) – Higher Education and Research Division;
  - Lino Cardarelli (Italy) – Business Development Division;
  - Amb. Celia Attard Pirotta (Malta) – Social and Civil Affairs Division;
  - Rafiq Husseini (Palestine) – Water and Environment Division;
  - Amb. Yigit Alpogan (Turkey) – Transport and Urban Development Division.

In 2017, the secretariat of the UfM has a staff of 60 persons from more than 20 nationalities, including the permanent presence of senior officials seconded from the European Commission, the EIB, and CDC.

== Other organizations and euro-Mediterranean institutions ==
=== Euro-Mediterranean Parliamentary Assembly ===
The Euro-Mediterranean Parliamentary Assembly (EMPA) is not a new institution inside the Euro-Mediterranean Partnership framework. It was established in Naples on 3 December 2003 by the Euro-Mediterranean Ministers of Foreign Affairs and had its first plenary session in Athens on 22–23 March 2004. The EMPA gathers parliamentarians from the Euro-Mediterranean countries and has four permanent committees on the following issues:

- Political Affairs, Security and Human Rights
- Economic, Financial and Social Affairs and Education
- Promotion of the Quality of Life, Human Exchanges and Culture
- Women's Rights in the Euro-Mediterranean Countries

The EMPA also has an ad hoc committee on Energy and Environment. Since the launch of the Union for the Mediterranean, the EMPA's role has been strengthened for it is considered the "legitimate parliamentary expression of the Union".

It was absorbed in 2010 by the Parliamentary Assembly of the Union of the Mediterranean (PA-UfM).

=== Euro-Mediterranean Regional and Local Assembly ===
At the Euro-Mediterranean Foreign Affairs Conference held in Marseille in November 2008, the Ministers welcomed the EU Committee of the Regions proposal to establish a Euro-Mediterranean Assembly of Local and Regional Authorities (ARLEM in French). Its aim is to bridge between the local and regional representatives of the 43 countries with the Union for the Mediterranean and EU institutions.

The EU participants are the members of the EU Committee of the Regions, as well as representatives from other EU institutions engaged with the Euro-Mediterranean Partnership. From the Mediterranean partner countries, the participants are representatives of regional and local authorities appointed by their national governments. The ARLEM was formally established and held its first plenary session in Barcelona on 31 January 2010. The ARLEM's co-presidency is held by the President of the EU Committee of the Regions, Luc Van den Brande, and the Moroccan mayor of Al Hoceima, Mohammed Boudra.

On 5 November 2022, Turkish authorities detained at the port of İzmir the First Vice-President of the European Committee of the Regions, Apostolos Tzitzikostas, who was en route to co-chair a meeting of the Euro-Mediterranean Regional and Local Assembly on behalf of the President of the Committee of the Regions. The assembly released a statement condemning this action and described it abusive and unprovoked and asked for clarification and credible explanations from the Turkish government for the incident.

=== Anna Lindh Foundation ===
The Anna Lindh Foundation for the Dialogue between Cultures, with headquarters are in Alexandria, Egypt, was established in April 2005. It is a network for the civil society organisations of the Euro-Mediterranean countries, aiming at the promotion of intercultural dialogue and mutual understanding.

At the Paris Summit it was agreed that the Anna Lindh Foundation, along with the UN Alliance of Civilizations will be in charge of the cultural dimension of the Union for the Mediterranean.

In September 2010 the Anna Lindh Foundation published a report called "EuroMed Intercultural Trends 2010". This evaluation about mutual perceptions and the visibility of the Union of the Mediterranean across the region is based on a Gallup Public Opinion Survey in which 13,000 people from the Union of the Mediterranean countries participated.

=== Partnerships with other organizations and Euro-Mediterranean institutions ===
As a platform for dialogue and cooperation, the Union for the Mediterranean engages in strategic partnerships with global, regional and sub-regional organizations.

During the past few years, the UfM strengthened its ties with relevant stakeholders through the signature of various Memoranda of Understanding:

- CIHEAM (International Center for Advanced Mediterranean Agronomic Studies) – 8 January 2015
- EESC (European Economic and Social Committee) – 13 January 2015
- Spanish Ministry of Economy and Competitiveness – 26 January 2015
- AFAEMME (Association of Organisations of Mediterranean Businesswomen) – 11 February 2015
- Agency for International Cooperation and Local Development in the Mediterranean – 16 February 2015
- British University in Egypt – 14 March 2015
- EMUNI University (Euro-Mediterranean University) – 8 April 2015
- IRU (International Road Transport Union) – 10 April 2015
- IPEMED (Institut de Prospective économique du monde Méditerranéen) – 4 May 2015
- UNIDO – 22 May 2015
- BUSINESSMED – 9 June 2015
- BSEC (Organization of the Black Sea Economic Cooperation) – 18 June 2015
- UNESCO – 14 October 2015
- CETMO (Center for Transportation Studies for the Western Mediterranean) – 26 November 2015
- Energy Charter Secretariat – 26 November 2015
- EMUNI University – 1 February 2016
- International Energy Agency – 17 February 2016
- Service de la Coopération Marocaine – 8 March 2016
- UN Habitat – 5 April 2016
- Conseil de la Région Tangier-Tétouan-Al Hoceima – 22 June 2016
- Ministry of Foreign Affairs and Cooperation of Spain – 29 July 2016
- ANIMA Investment Network – 7 September 2016
- Groupe interacadémique pour le développement – 29 September 2016
- IEMed (European Institute of the Mediterranean) – 20 January 2017
- SIDA (Swedish International Development Cooperation Agency) – 23 January 2017
- UN Office for South-South Cooperation – 24 January 2017
- Fundación Mujeres por Africa – 24 January 2017
- AGADIR Technical Unit – 24 January 2017
- MENBO Permanent Secretariat – 10 March 2017
- EMUNI University – 14 March 2017
- Konrad Adenauer Stiftung – 10 April 2017
- World Alliance for Efficient Solutions – 24 May 2017
- SDSN Mediterranean – 1 June 2017
- Institut Méditerranéen de l’Eau – 8 June 2017
- Euro-Mediterranean University of Fes – 20 June 2017
- IEMed – 20 July 2017
- UNFCCC Secretariat, Organization of the 2017 Forum of the Standing Committee on Finance, 3 August 2017
- ACUP, International Conference on Sustainable Development Goals, 15 September 2017
- World Tourism Organization, Institutional cooperation – IO, 1 October 2017
- Federal Ministry of Economy – Germany, Institutional cooperation, 5 October 2017
- Eastern Mediterranean International School, YOCOPAS Conference, 11 October 2017
- Arab League, Institutional cooperation – IO, 17 October 2017
- Union Internationale Des Transports Publics, Institutional cooperation, 9 November 2017
- AViTeM – Villa Méditerranée, Institutional cooperation, 21 November 2017
- General Fisheries Commission for the Mediterranean of the FAO, Institutional cooperation – IO, 30 November 2017
- Fédération de l'Energie du Maroc, Institutional cooperation, 19 December 2017
- Le Plan Bleu, Joint Editing and publication of a report regarding the environmental changes in the Mediterranean, 22 December 2017

== Funding ==
The Paris Declaration states that contributions for the Union for the Mediterranean will have to develop the capacity to attract funding from "the private sector participation; contributions from the EU budget and all partners; contributions from other countries, international financial institutions and regional entities; the Euro-Mediterranean Investment and Partnership Facility (FEMIP); the ENPI", among other possible instruments,

- The European Commission contributes to the Union for the Mediterranean through the European Neighbourhood Policy Instrument (ENPI). In July 2009 the ENPI allocated €72 million for the following Union for the Mediterranean projects during 2009–2010:
  - De-pollution of the Mediterranean (€22 million).
  - Maritime and land highways (€7.5 million).
  - Alternative energies: Mediterranean Solar Plan (€5 million).
  - Euro-Mediterranean University of Slovenia (€1 million)
- The European Neighbourhood Instrument (ENI) came into force in 2014. It is the financial arm of the European Neighbourhood Policy, the EU's foreign policy towards its neighbours to the East and to the South. It has a budget of €15.4 billion and will provide the bulk of funding through a number of programmes. The ENI, effective from 2014 to 2020, replaces the European Neighbourhood and Partnership Instrument – known as the ENPI.
- The European Investment Bank contributes to the Union for the Mediterranean through its Euro-Mediterranean Investment and Partnership (FEMIP). Specifically, the FEMIP was mandated by the Euro-Mediterranean Ministers of Finance in 2008 to support three of the six concrete projects: the de-pollution of the Mediterranean; alternative energies; and maritime and land highways. Following the June 2012 meeting the EIB announced it would give 500 million euros to support projects for the UfM.
- The InfraMed Infrastructure Fund was established in June 2010 by five financial entities: the French Caisse des Dépôts, the Moroccan Caisse de Dépôts et de Gestion, the Egyptian EFG Hermes, the Italian Cassa Depositi e Prestiti and the European Investment Bank. On an initial phase, the Fund will contribute €385 million to the Secretariat's projects on infrastructure.
- The World Bank has allocated $750 million for the renewable energy project through the Clean Technology Fund.

== List of Sectorial Ministerial meetings ==
- Economic-Financial Meeting, 7 October 2008, Luxembourg City (Luxembourg).
- Industry, 5–6 November 2008, Nice (France).
- Employment and Labor, 9–10 November 2008, Marrakech (Morocco).
- Health, 11 November 2008, Cairo (Egypt).
- Water, 22 December 2008, Amman (Jordan).
- Sustainable Development, 25 June 2009, Paris (France).
- Economic-Financial Meeting, 7 July 2009, Brussels (Belgium).
- Strengthening the Role of Women in Society, 11–12 November, Marrakech (Morocco).
- Trade, 9 December 2009, Brussels (Belgium).
- Water, 21–22 April 2010, Barcelona (Spain).
- Tourism, 20 May 2010, Barcelona (Spain).
- Employment and Labour, 21–22 November 2010, Brussels (Belgium).
- Sustainable Urban Development, 9–10 November 2011, Strasbourg (France).
- Strengthening the role of women in society – September 2013, Paris (France).
- Transport – November 2013, Brussels (Belgium).
- Energy – December 2013, Brussels (Belgium).
- Industrial cooperation – February 2014, Brussels (Belgium).
- Environment and climate change – May 2014, Athens (Greece).
- Digital Economy – September 2014, Brussels (Belgium).
- Blue Economy – November 2015, Brussels (Belgium).
- Employment and Labour - September 2016, Dead Sea (Jordan).
- Energy - December 2016, Rome (Italy).
- Water - April 2017, Valletta (Malta).
- Sustainable Urban Development - May 2017, Cairo (Egypt).
- Strengthening the Role of Women in Society – November 2017, Cairo (Egypt).
- Trade - March 2018, Brussels (Belgium).

== See also ==
- Asia-Pacific Economic Cooperation
- Eastern Partnership
- Future enlargement of the European Union
- Indian Ocean Rim Association for Regional Cooperation
- Organization of the Black Sea Economic Cooperation
- Roman Empire
- Open Balkan
- Craiovia Group
- CEFTA
- Mediterranean Dialogue
