= Nasser Kamel =

Egyptian statesman

His Excellency Nasser Kamel Ambassador
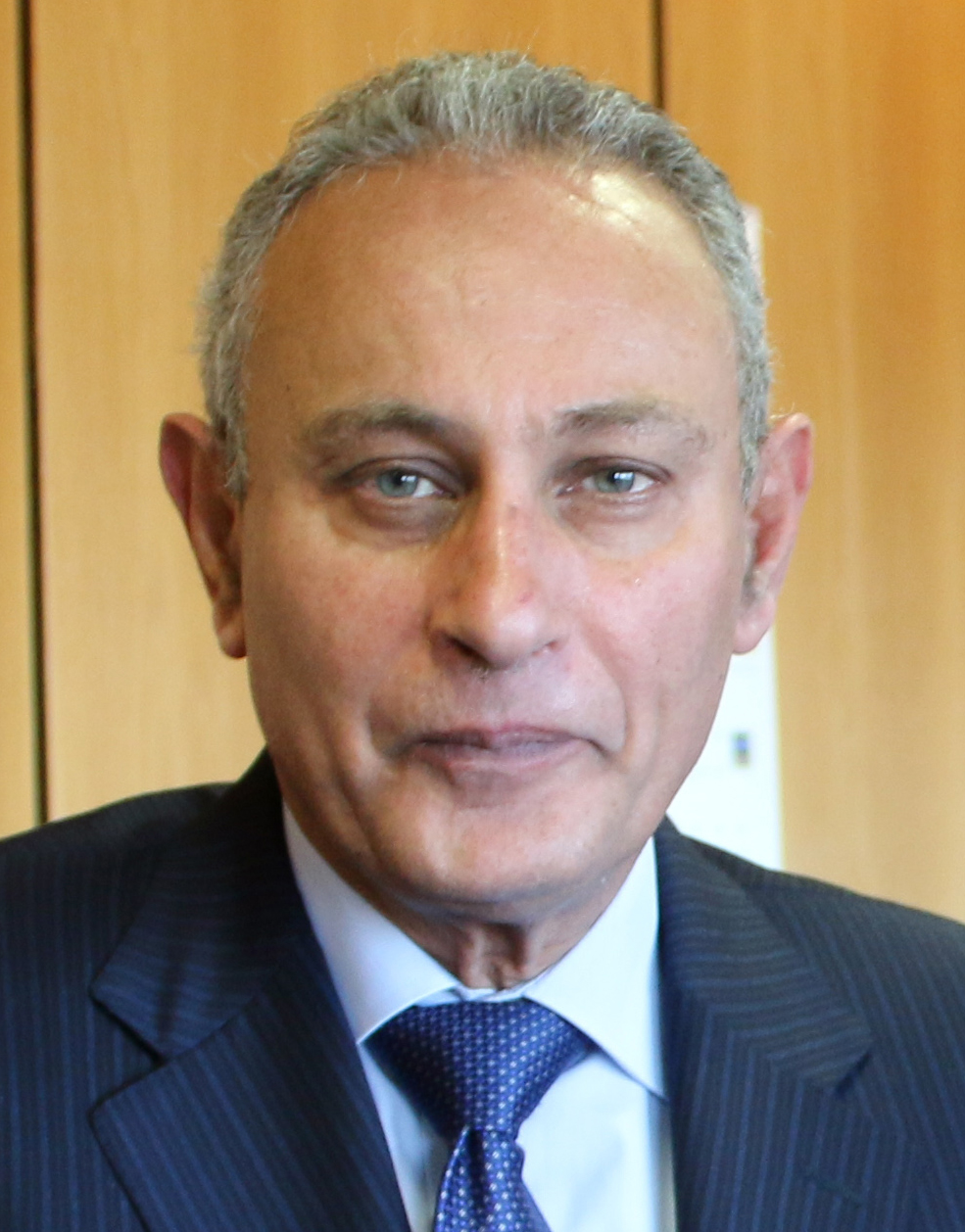

Egypt Ambassador to the United Kingdom
- In office 2014–2018

Egypt Ambassador to France
- In office 2006–2012

Personal details
- Born: 1959 (age 66–67) Cairo, Egypt
- Party: Independent
- Spouse: Dalia Elbatal
- Education: Ecole Nationale D'Administration (ENA); Cairo University
- Occupation: Ambassador

Nasser Kamel (Arabic: ناصر كامل; born July 1959) is an Egyptian statesman. He currently serves as the Secretary General of the Union for the Mediterranean.

Previous roles include Ambassador of Egypt to France and Monaco as well as Ambassador of Egypt to the United Kingdom. Kamel also serving as Deputy Foreign Minister of Egypt for North African and Middle Eastern Affairs and briefly held the position of Chairman of the State Information Service.

Kamel holds the title of Grand Officier de l'ordre national du Mérite, an Order of State with membership (about 187,000 members) awarded by the President of the French Republic.
