= E-corpus =

French defunt digital library platform

E-corpus was a collective heritage digital platform founded in 2009 in France by the Centre de Conservation du Livre. Its name is sometimes written in lowercase: e-corpus. It went offline in September 2016.

== Introduction ==
E-corpus makes known, catalogs, circulates and offers access to many millions of digital documents of all types: texts (manuscripts, archives, books, magazines) as well as iconographic heritage and cultural objects (photos, prints and engravings, sound recordings, videos, works of art). Its interface is available in several languages (French, English, Chinese, Arabic, Spanish, Catalan and Italian).

The various partners — principally libraires, museums or archives — deposit their content on this basis.

The description of the documents is hierarchical with metadata in the XML-EAD format, which can then be converted into other formats, notably into Dublin Core. An OAI-PMH archive permits interoperability with other platforms (Isidore (rechercheisidore.fr), Gallica (Bibliothèque nationale de France), and Google Books).

== See also ==
- Bibliothèque nationale de France
- Google Books
