= Parliamentary Assembly of the Union for the Mediterranean =

Parliamentary assembly

- Logo

History
- Founded: 3 December 2003

Leadership
- Presidency: Roberta Metsola; Meritxell Batet; Rachid Talbi Alami
- Seats: 240

Meeting place
- 37 Via della Penitenza; Rome, Italy

Website
- https://paufm.org/

Mr. Hans-Gert Pöttering, president of the European Parliament at the opening of the plenary session of the Euromed parliamentary assembly in Tunis 17 March 2007.

The Parliamentary Assembly of the Union for the Mediterranean (PAUfM), previously known as the Euro-Mediterranean Parliamentary Assembly (EMPA), established in Naples on 3 December 2003 by decision of the Ministerial Conference of the Euro-Mediterranean Partnership, is an institution of the Barcelona Process. The EMPA opened its proceedings in Vouliagmeni (Athens) on 22 and 23 March 2004. Its first Bureau comprises the Presidents of the Egyptian People's Assembly, the European Parliament (EP), the Tunisian Chamber of Deputies and the Greek Parliament.

== Nature and functions of the PAUM ==
The PAUM is the Barcelona Process's parliamentary institution and plays a consultative role.

- It provides parliamentary impetus, input and support for the consolidation and development of the Euro-Mediterranean Partnership.
- It expresses its views on all issues relating to the Partnership, including the implementation of the association agreements.
- It adopts resolutions or recommendations, which are not legally binding, addressed to the Euro-Mediterranean Conference.

== Membership ==
The PAUM consists of parliamentarians appointed by:

- the national parliaments of the member states of the European Union;
- the national parliaments of the ten Mediterranean partners (Algeria, Egypt, Jordan, Israel, Lebanon, Morocco, Palestine, Syria, Tunisia and Turkey);
- the European Parliament.

The PAUM consists of a maximum of 240 Members, of which 120 are Europeans (75 from the EU national parliaments and 45 from the EP) and 120 are from the NPs of the EU's Mediterranean partner countries, so as to guarantee north–south parity.

It is organised on the basis of national delegations and European Parliament delegations. It meets at least once a year.

== Committees ==
The Assembly consists of four committees and one ad hoc committee, each with 80 members and a four-member Bureau. They are responsible for addressing each of the partnership's strands:

- the Committee on Political Affairs, Security and Human Rights;
- the Committee on Economic, Financial and Social Affairs and Education;
- the Committee on the Promotion of the Quality of Life, Human Exchanges and Culture.
- the Committee on Women's Rights
- the ad hoc Committee on Energy and Environment

== See also ==
- Union for the Mediterranean (UfM)
- Euronest Parliamentary Assembly - EMPA counterpart for the Eastern Partnership of the ENP
