= Foreign relations of Luxembourg =

The Grand Duchy of Luxembourg has long been a prominent supporter of European political and economic integration. In 1921, Luxembourg and Belgium formed the Belgium-Luxembourg Economic Union (BLEU) to create an inter-exchangeable currency and a common customs regime. Post-war, Luxembourg became a founding member state of the United Nations, and dropped its policy of neutrality to become a founding member state of NATO. Luxembourg expanded its support for European integration, becoming a founding member state of the Benelux Economic Union (today's Benelux Union), and one of the "inner six" founding member states of the three European Communities; the European Coal and Steel Community (ECSC), the European Atomic Energy Community (Euratom), and the European Economic Community (EEC). Subsequently, Luxembourg became a founding member state of the European Union (EU) when the EEC and ECSC were incorporated into it in 1993. Luxembourg is a founding member of the Schengen Area, abolishing internal borders amongst its member states, named after the Luxembourg village where the original agreement — since incorporated into EU law — was signed in 1985. At the same time, the majority of Luxembourgers have consistently believed that European unity makes sense only in the context of a dynamic transatlantic relationship, and thus have traditionally pursued a pro-NATO, pro-US foreign policy.

Luxembourg is the site of the European Court of Justice, the European Investment Bank, the European Court of Auditors, the secretariat of the European Parliament, the Statistical Office of the European Commission (Eurostat), and other EU bodies.

== Diplomatic relations ==
List of countries which Luxembourg maintains diplomatic relations with:

#	Country	Date
1	France	10 December 1890
2	Italy	7 February 1891
—	Holy See	9 February 1891
3	Spain	9 February 1891
4	Netherlands	23 February 1891
5	Russia	7 March 1891
6	Portugal	21 May 1891
7	United Kingdom	8 June 1891
8	Belgium	18 April 1892
9	United States	17 July 1903
10	Denmark	4 June 1906
11	Romania	5 December 1910
12	Brazil	15 April 1911
13	Switzerland	24 November 1917
14	Poland	18 April 1921
15	Finland	25 October 1921
16	Czech Republic	24 April 1922
17	Sweden	25 January 1923
18	Hungary	17 July 1923
19	Guatemala	7 November 1924
20	Serbia	23 August 1927
21	Japan	27 November 1927
22	Norway	15 April 1931
23	Greece	13 December 1933
24	Uruguay	6 January 1934
25	Egypt	14 November 1935
26	Iran	23 May 1936
27	Austria	17 November 1936
28	Argentina	28 June 1937
29	Chile	22 January 1938
30	Cuba	25 November 1942
31	Canada	3 January 1945
32	Turkey	10 July 1946
33	Philippines	26 August 1946
34	Mexico	8 January 1947
35	Monaco	18 December 1947
36	India	1 July 1948
37	South Africa	1949
38	Venezuela	14 March 1950
39	Israel	21 November 1950
40	Lebanon	21 November 1950
41	Germany	23 April 1951
42	Indonesia	8 January 1952
43	Iraq	12 March 1952
44	Syria	24 July 1953
45	Ecuador	24 April 1956
46	Bulgaria	16 December 1956
47	Malaysia	1957
48	Morocco	11 April 1958
49	Pakistan	5 May 1959
50	Thailand	16 June 1959
51	Liberia	20 January 1961
52	Mauritania	20 September 1961
53	Gabon	1 December 1961
54	Ireland	20 December 1961
55	South Korea	16 March 1962
56	Cameroon	7 June 1962
57	Peru	14 June 1962
58	Iceland	30 July 1962
59	Guinea	12 September 1962
60	Niger	18 December 1962
61	Jamaica	2 January 1963
62	Burkina Faso	29 January 1963
63	Costa Rica	29 January 1963
64	Ivory Coast	29 January 1963
65	Central African Republic	12 June 1963
66	Algeria	21 January 1964
67	Chad	28 April 1964
68	Tunisia	28 April 1964
69	Rwanda	27 October 1964
70	Paraguay	26 February 1965
71	Burundi	29 April 1965
72	Democratic Republic of the Congo	7 September 1965
73	Mali	15 December 1965
74	Madagascar	13 January 1967
75	Republic of the Congo	10 June 1967
76	Ghana	21 February 1968
77	Senegal	13 June 1968
78	Benin	17 September 1968
79	Malta	28 January 1969
80	Trinidad and Tobago	17 December 1969
81	Cyprus	3 March 1970
82	Australia	18 September 1970
83	Sierra Leone	13 October 1970
84	New Zealand	3 December 1970
85	Fiji	January 1971
86	Colombia	21 April 1971
87	Albania	15 February 1972
88	Togo	7 March 1972
89	Sri Lanka	27 July 1972
90	China	16 November 1972
91	Mauritius	28 February 1973
92	Vietnam	15 November 1973
93	Bangladesh	20 November 1973
94	Jordan	5 December 1973
95	Singapore	17 March 1975
96	Gambia	15 April 1975
97	Nepal	27 November 1975
98	Nigeria	29 December 1975
99	Nicaragua	7 July 1976
100	Mongolia	11 July 1976
101	Tonga	1 November 1976
102	Cape Verde	31 March 1977
103	Barbados	5 May 1977
104	Botswana	30 September 1977
105	Uganda	30 September 1977
106	Papua New Guinea	15 October 1977
107	Saudi Arabia	10 December 1977
108	Comoros	1 February 1978
109	Honduras	6 July 1978
110	Dominica	1 May 1979
111	Guinea-Bissau	7 December 1979
112	Yemen	10 December 1979
113	Kuwait	8 March 1980
114	Bahrain	14 March 1980
115	Ethiopia	19 March 1980
116	Qatar	3 May 1980
117	United Arab Emirates	6 May 1980
118	Oman	15 September 1980
119	Malawi	28 October 1980
120	Tanzania	14 December 1980
121	Zimbabwe	15 December 1981
122	Kenya	15 May 1982
123	Lesotho	15 May 1982
124	Sudan	3 May 1984
125	Panama	12 November 1985
126	Mozambique	7 January 1988
127	Maldives	11 July 1988
128	Seychelles	17 February 1989
129	Bolivia	21 December 1990
130	El Salvador	26 April 1991
131	Estonia	29 August 1991
132	Latvia	29 January 1992
133	Slovenia	11 March 1992
134	Croatia	29 April 1992
135	Tajikistan	22 May 1992
136	Kyrgyzstan	26 May 1992
137	Azerbaijan	1 June 1992
138	Uzbekistan	10 June 1992
139	Armenia	11 June 1992
140	Moldova	16 June 1992
141	Liechtenstein	26 June 1992
142	Kazakhstan	29 June 1992
143	Ukraine	1 July 1992
144	Lithuania	2 July 1992
145	Belarus	9 July 1992
146	Turkmenistan	2 October 1992
147	Slovakia	1 January 1993
148	Marshall Islands	20 July 1993
149	Bosnia and Herzegovina	12 April 1994
150	North Macedonia	19 September 1994
151	Georgia	17 October 1994
152	Andorra	7 April 1995
153	Libya	28 February 1996
154	Eritrea	13 September 1996
155	Zambia	24 October 1996
156	Namibia	14 January 1997
157	Equatorial Guinea	17 April 1997
158	Laos	25 September 1997
159	Eswatini	16 December 1998
160	San Marino	8 February 2001
161	North Korea	5 March 2001
162	Djibouti	14 June 2001
163	Angola	14 May 2002
164	Cambodia	15 May 2002
165	Brunei	18 July 2003
166	Afghanistan	13 January 2005
167	Dominican Republic	25 May 2005
168	Haiti	10 January 2006
169	Montenegro	21 September 2006
170	Grenada	1 March 2007
171	Antigua and Barbuda	26 September 2007
172	Saint Vincent and the Grenadines	26 September 2007
173	Timor-Leste	27 September 2007
174	Bahamas	28 September 2007
175	Federated States of Micronesia	24 April 2008
176	Belize	15 May 2008
177	Samoa	2 June 2009
178	Guyana	17 June 2009
179	Saint Kitts and Nevis	18 June 2009
180	Tuvalu	16 September 2009
181	Saint Lucia	23 September 2009
182	Suriname	1 February 2010
183	Nauru	21 May 2010
184	Vanuatu	24 September 2010
185	Solomon Islands	19 November 2010
—	Kosovo	16 June 2011
186	Bhutan	1 December 2011
187	South Sudan	22 December 2011
188	Palau	16 February 2012
189	Myanmar	31 July 2012
190	Somalia	27 September 2013
191	São Tomé and Príncipe	10 April 2014
—	State of Palestine	22 September 2025

== Bilateral relations ==
=== Americas ===
Country	Formal Relations Began	Notes
Canada	3 January 1945	See Canada–Luxembourg relations Diplomatic relations were established on 3 January 1945: Canada is accredited to Luxembourg from its embassy in Brussels, Belgium.; Before opening its embassy in Ottawa in late 2024, Luxembourg is accredited to Canada from its embassy in Washington, D.C., United States and maintains four honorary consulates (in Calgary, Montreal, Toronto, and Vancouver).; Both countries are full members of the Organisation for Economic Co-operation and Development, NATO and the Organisation internationale de la Francophonie.
Mexico	8 January 1947	See Luxembourg–Mexico relations Diplomatic relations were established on 8 January 1947 In 1980, Prime Minister Pierre Werner paid an official visit to Mexico. In March 1996, Grand Duke Jean paid a visit to Mexico. During the Grand Duke's visit, both nations signed an Air Transportation Agreement. In April 2019, Prime Minister Xavier Bettel paid an official visit to Mexico and met with President Andrés Manuel López Obrador.: Before having its consulate in Mexico City, Luxembourg is accredited to Mexico from its embassy in Washington, D.C., United States and maintains an honorary consulate in Mérida.; Mexico is accredited to Luxembourg from its embassy in Brussels, Belgium and maintains an honorary consulate in Luxembourg City.
United States	17 July 1903	Diplomatic relations were established on 17 July 1903 Embassy of Luxembourg in Washington, D.C. Main article: Luxembourg–United States relations See also: List of ambassadors of Luxembourg to the United States The United States, fighting on the Allied side, contributed to Luxembourg's liberation in World War I and World War II. More than 5,000 American soldiers, including U.S. Army General George S. Patton, are buried at the Luxembourg American Cemetery and Memorial near the capital of Luxembourg City, and there are monuments in many towns to American liberators. The strong U.S.-Luxembourg relationship is expressed both bilaterally and through common membership in NATO, the Organisation for Economic Co-operation and Development (OECD), and the Organization for Security and Co-operation in Europe (OSCE).: Luxembourg has an embassy in Washington, D.C. and consulates-general in New York City and San Francisco.; United States has an embassy in Luxembourg City.

=== Asia ===
Country	Formal Relations Began	Notes
China	16 November 1972	Diplomatic relations were established on 16 November 1972 See China–Luxembourg relations: China has an embassy in Luxembourg City.; Luxembourg has an embassy in Beijing.
India	1 July 1948	Diplomatic relations were established on 1 July 1948 See India–Luxembourg relations: India has a consulate general in Luxembourg City.; Luxembourg has an embassy in New Delhi.
Japan		See Japan–Luxembourg relations: Luxembourg has an embassy in Tokyo.; Japan has an embassy in Luxembourg City.
Palestine		See Luxembourg–Palestine relations: Palestine is accredited to Luxembourg from its mission in Brussels, Belgium.; Luxembourg is accredited to Palestine from its Ministry of Foreign Affairs in Luxembourg City.
South Korea	16 March 1962	Luxembourg and South Korea established diplomatic relations on 16 March 1962.; Both countries have a shipping agreement in 1987 and an air agreement in 2003.; Luxembourg is accredited to South Korea from its embassy in Tokyo, Japan.; South Korea is accredited to Luxembourg from its embassy in Brussels, Belgium.; High-level Exchanges.; 1983 April Chairperson of the Advisory Council on State Affairs Choi Kyu-hah.; 1996 October the Minister of Foreign Affairs and Trade Gong Roh-myong.; From Luxembourg to the South Korea.; 1997 September Grand Duke Henri and Minister of Economic Affairs Robert Goebbels.; 2000 October Prime Minister Jean-Claude Juncker and the Minister of Foreign Affairs Lydie Polfer. (To attend the third ASEM meeting).; 2001 March Hereditary Grand Duke Guillaume.; 2004 March Minister of Economy Grethen. (Economic Mission).; 2006 October Minister of Finance and Budget Frieden and Prince Guillaume of Luxembourg.; 2011 April Ministry of Foreign Affairs Jean Asselborn.; 2011 May Hereditary Grand Duke Guillaume and Minister of Economy Jeannot Krecke.
Turkey	10 July 1946	See Luxembourg–Turkey relations Diplomatic relations were established on 10 July 1946 Bilateral relations between the Republic of Turkey and the Grand Duchy of Luxembourg gained momentum with the opening of a Turkish Embassy in Luxembourg in 1987.: Luxembourg has an embassy in Ankara, which was opened on 29 November 2011.; Turkey has an embassy in Luxembourg City.; There are 500 ethnic Turk's living in Luxembourg, 200 of whom have dual citizenship. The trade volume between the two States had reached $217 million in 2011. Luxembourg strongly supports Turkey's candidacy as a full European Union member.
Vietnam	15 November 1973	See Luxembourg–Vietnam relations Diplomatic relations were established on 15 November 1973: Luxembourg is accredited to Vietnam from its embassy in Beijing, China.; Vietnam is accredited to Luxembourg from its embassy in Brussels, Belgium.

=== Europe ===
Country	Formal Relations Began	Notes
Austria	30 January 1891	Diplomatic relations were established on 30 January 1891: Austria has an embassy in Luxembourg City.; Luxembourg has an embassy in Vienna.; Both countries are full members of the European Union.
Belgium	18 April 1892	See Belgium–Luxembourg relations Diplomatic relations were established on 18 April 1892: Belgium has an embassy in Luxembourg City.; Luxembourg has an embassy in Brussels.; Both countries are full members of the European Union and NATO.
Bulgaria	16 December 1956	Diplomatic relations were established on 16 December 1956: Bulgaria is accredited to Luxembourg from its mission in Brussels, Belgium.; Luxembourg is accredited to Bulgaria from its mission in Prague, the Czech Republic.; Both countries are full members of the European Union and NATO.
Cyprus	3 March 1970	Diplomatic relations were established on 3 March 1970: Cyprus is accredited to Luxembourg from its embassy in The Hague, the Netherlands.; Luxembourg is accredited to Cyprus from its embassy in Athens, Greece.; Both countries are full members of the European Union.
Czech Republic	24 April 1922	Diplomatic relations were established on 24 April 1922 See also: List of ambassadors of Luxembourg to the Czech Republic: The Czech Republic has an embassy in Luxembourg City.; Luxembourg has an embassy in Prague.; Both countries are full members of the Organisation for Economic Co-operation and Development, of the European Union and of NATO.; Both countries shared a common fate in the 14th century when John the Blind of Luxembourg married Eliška Přemyslovna sister of the deceased King Wenceslaus III of Bohemia and became king of Bohemia.
Denmark	4 June 1906	Diplomatic relations were established on 4 June 1906: Denmark has an embassy in Luxembourg City.; Luxembourg has an embassy in Copenhagen.; Both countries are full members of the Council of Europe, the European Union, and NATO.
Estonia	29 August 1991	Luxembourg recognised Estonia on February 22, 1923, and re-recognised Estonia on August 27, 1991. Both countries re-established diplomatic relations on August 29, 1991 In 1937, a prominent Estonian political leader Artur Sirk, while a fugitive in Luxembourg was found dead, having apparently committed suicide by jumping out a second-story window. Although the Luxembourg Gendarmerie report assumed suicide, because of inconsistencies in the report, the Estonian chargé d'affaires in Paris, Rudolph Mollerson was sent to investigate. Estonian historians including Pusta and Tomingas have argued that the death was an act of defenestration by agents of the first President of Estonia, Konstantin Päts. As of December 31, 2007, foreign investments made in Estonia originating from Luxembourg totaled 225 million EUR accounting for 2% of the total volume of foreign direct investments. There are about 300 Estonians living in Luxembourg. An Estonian cultural association was founded in 1998. Estonian President Arnold Rüütel made a state visit to Luxembourg in May 2003, prime minister Andrus Ansip's in 2006.Luxembourgish Prime Minister Jean-Claude Juncker visited Estonia in 1999 and 2007.: Trade agreement between Estonia and Belgium and Luxembourg (1935); Agreement on Road Transport between Estonia, Latvia, Lithuania, Belgium, Luxembourg and the Netherlands (came into force 1.12.94); Agreement Between Estonia and the Belgo-Luxembourg Economic Union on the Reciprocal Promotion and Protection of Investments (came into force 23.09.99); Agreement Between Estonia and the States of Benelux on Readmission of Persons (came into force 1.02.05); Agreement on the Avoidance of Double Taxation and the Prevention of Income and Capital Tax evasion (signed 23.05.2006); Estonia is accredited to Luxembourg from its embassy in Brussels, Belgium and maintains an honorary consulate in Luxembourg City. Luxembourg is represented in Estonia through its embassy in Prague (Czech Republic).; Luxembourg is accredited to Estonia from its embassy in Prague, Czech Republic.; Both countries are full members of the European Union and NATO.
Finland	25 October 1921	Diplomatic relations were established on 25 October 1921; Luxembourg is accredited to Finland from its embassy in Copenhagen, Denmark.; Finland has an embassy in Luxembourg City.; Ministry for Foreign Affairs of Finland about relations with Luxembourg; Both countries are full members of the European Union and NATO.
France	15 December 1890	See France–Luxembourg relations Diplomatic relations were established on 15 December 1890: Luxembourg was besieged by Louis XIV of France in 1684 and was annexed by Revolutionary France to be part of the Forêts département during the War of the First Coalition in 1795 until Napoleon's defeat in 1815.; France has an embassy in Luxembourg City.; Luxembourg has an embassy in Paris, a consulate general in Strasbourg, and consulates in Bordeaux, Lille, Longwy, Lyon, Marseille, and Metz.; Both countries are full members of the Council of Europe, European Union, NATO, the Organisation for Economic Co-operation and Development, and the Organization for Security and Co-operation in Europe.
Germany	8 January 1891	See Germany–Luxembourg relations Diplomatic relations were established on 8 January 1891: Germany has an embassy in Luxembourg City.; Luxembourg has an embassy in Berlin.; Both countries are full members of the European Union and NATO.
Greece		See Greece—Luxembourg relations: Greece has an embassy in Luxembourg City.; Luxembourg has an embassy in Athens and 3 honorary consulates in Athens, Heraklion and Thessaloniki.; Both countries are full members of the European Union and NATO.; Greek Ministry of Foreign Affairs about relations with Luxembourg; Luxembourg’s Ministry of Foreign Affairs about relations with Greece (in French only)
Ireland	20 December 1961	Diplomatic relations were established on 20 December 1961: Ireland has an embassy in Luxembourg City.; Luxembourg has an honorary consulate in Dublin.; Both countries are full members of the Council of Europe, of the Organisation for Economic Co-operation and Development and of the European Union.
Italy	7 February 1891	See Italy–Luxembourg relations Diplomatic relations were established on 7 February 1891: Italy has an embassy in Luxembourg City.; Luxembourg has an embassy in Rome and 9 honorary consulates (in Florence, Genoa, Milan, Naples, Palermo, Perugia, Riccione, Turin, and Venice).; Both countries are full members of the Organisation for Economic Co-operation and Development, of the European Union and of NATO.; There are around 19,000 people of Italian descent living in Luxembourg.
Kosovo	16 June 2011	See Kosovo–Luxembourg relations Diplomatic relations were established on 16 June 2011 Luxembourg recognized the independence of Kosovo on 21 February 2008.: Kosovo is accredited to Luxembourg from its embassy in Brussels, Belgium.; Luxembourg has an embassy in Pristina.
Lithuania	2 July 1992	Diplomatic relations were established on 2 July 1992; Luxembourg did not recognise the annexation of the Baltic States by the USSR in 1940-1991 either de iure or de facto.; Lithuania is accredited to Luxembourg from its embassy in Brussels, Belgium and through an honorary consulate in Luxembourg City.; Luxembourg is accredited to Lithuania from its embassy in Warsaw, Poland and through an honorary consulate in Vilnius.; Both countries are full members of the European Union and NATO.; Lithuanian Ministry of Foreign Affairs: list of bilateral treaties with Luxembourg
Netherlands	4 March 1891	See Luxembourg–Netherlands relations Diplomatic relations were established on 4 March 1891: Luxembourg has an embassy in The Hague.; Netherlands has an embassy in Luxembourg City.; Both countries are full members of the European Union and NATO.
Poland	18 April 1921	See Luxembourg–Poland relations Diplomatic relations were established on 18 April 1921: Luxembourg has an embassy in Warsaw.; Poland has an embassy in Luxembourg City.; Both countries are full members of the European Union and NATO.
Romania	5 December 1910	Diplomatic relations were established on 5 December 1910: Luxembourg is accredited to Romania from its embassy in Athens, Greece and maintains two honorary consulates (in Bucharest and Sibiu).; Romania has an embassy in Luxembourg City.; Both countries are full members of the European Union and NATO.
Russia	7 March 1891	See Luxembourg–Russia relations Diplomatic relations were established on 7 March 1891: Luxembourg has an embassy in Moscow and an honorary consulate in Saint Petersburg.; Russia has an embassy in the city of Luxembourg City.; Both countries are full members of the Council of Europe, the Organization for Security and Co-operation in Europe, and the United Nations. In the history of bilateral relations, the first Russian president to come on an official visit to Luxembourg was Vladimir Putin on 24 May 2007. As bilateral trade had more than tripled from US$66.6 million in 2003 to US$228.3 million in 2006, time had come to strengthen the ties between the two countries, energy and finance being the key areas of cooperation between Russia and Luxembourg.
Spain	18 February 1891	See Luxembourg–Spain relations Diplomatic relations were established on 18 February 1891: Luxembourg has an embassy in Madrid.; Spain has an embassy in Luxembourg City.; Both countries are full members of the European Union and NATO.
Ukraine	1 July 1992	See Luxembourg–Ukraine relations Diplomatic relations were established on 1 July 1992: Luxembourg is accredited to Ukraine from its embassy in Prague, Czech Republic and through an honorary consulate in Kyiv.; Ukraine is accredited to Luxembourg from its embassy in Brussels, Belgium and through an honorary consulate in Luxembourg City.; Both countries are full members of the Council of Europe.
United Kingdom	1891	See Luxembourg–United Kingdom relations Luxembourger Foreign Minister Jean Asselborn with British Foreign Secretary William Hague in London, January 2011. Luxembourg established diplomatic relations with the United Kingdom on 8 June 1891.: Luxembourg maintains an embassy in London.; The United Kingdom is accredited to Luxembourg through its embassy in Luxembourg City.; Both countries share common membership of the Council of Europe, European Court of Human Rights, the International Criminal Court, NATO, OECD, OSCE, and the World Trade Organization. Bilaterally the two countries have a Double Taxation Convention.

=== Oceania ===
Country	Formal relations began	Notes
Australia	18 September 1970	See Australia–Luxembourg relations: Australia and Luxembourg formalized diplomatic relations in September 1970 with the first appointment of Australia's ambassador in Brussels as non-resident ambassador to Luxembourg. The first ambassador presented credentials on 13 October 1970. Since then Australia has remained represented in Luxembourg through its embassy in Brussels.; Luxembourg is represented in Australia through the embassy of the Netherlands in Canberra and through honorary consulates in Sydney and Melbourne.; Trade and investment figure strongly in the bilateral relationship and ministerial visits between the countries have focused on this. Luxembourg ranks as Australia's seventh largest investor (stocks) at A$93 billion in 2021, with Foreign Direct Investments (stocks) of $10 billion in Australia. Two-way goods and services trade in 2020 was valued at A$185 million. There is a reciprocal working holiday visa scheme between the two countries.
New Zealand	3 December 1970	Both countries established diplomatic relations on 3 December 1970 when first Ambassador of New Zealand To Luxembourg Mr. Merwyn Norrish presented his credentials

== See also ==
- List of diplomatic missions in Luxembourg
- List of diplomatic missions of Luxembourg
- List of ambassadors to Luxembourg
- Ministry of Foreign Affairs (Luxembourg)
