= Frieden =

Frieden (German: peace) is a surname. Notable people with the surname include:

- B. Roy Frieden, mathematical physicist
- Lex Frieden, educator, researcher, disability policy expert and disability rights activist
- Luc Frieden
- Pierre Frieden
- Rob Frieden
- Tanja Frieden, Swiss snowboarder
- Thomas R. Frieden, MD MPH, New York City Commissioner of Health
