= Luxembourg–Ukraine relations =

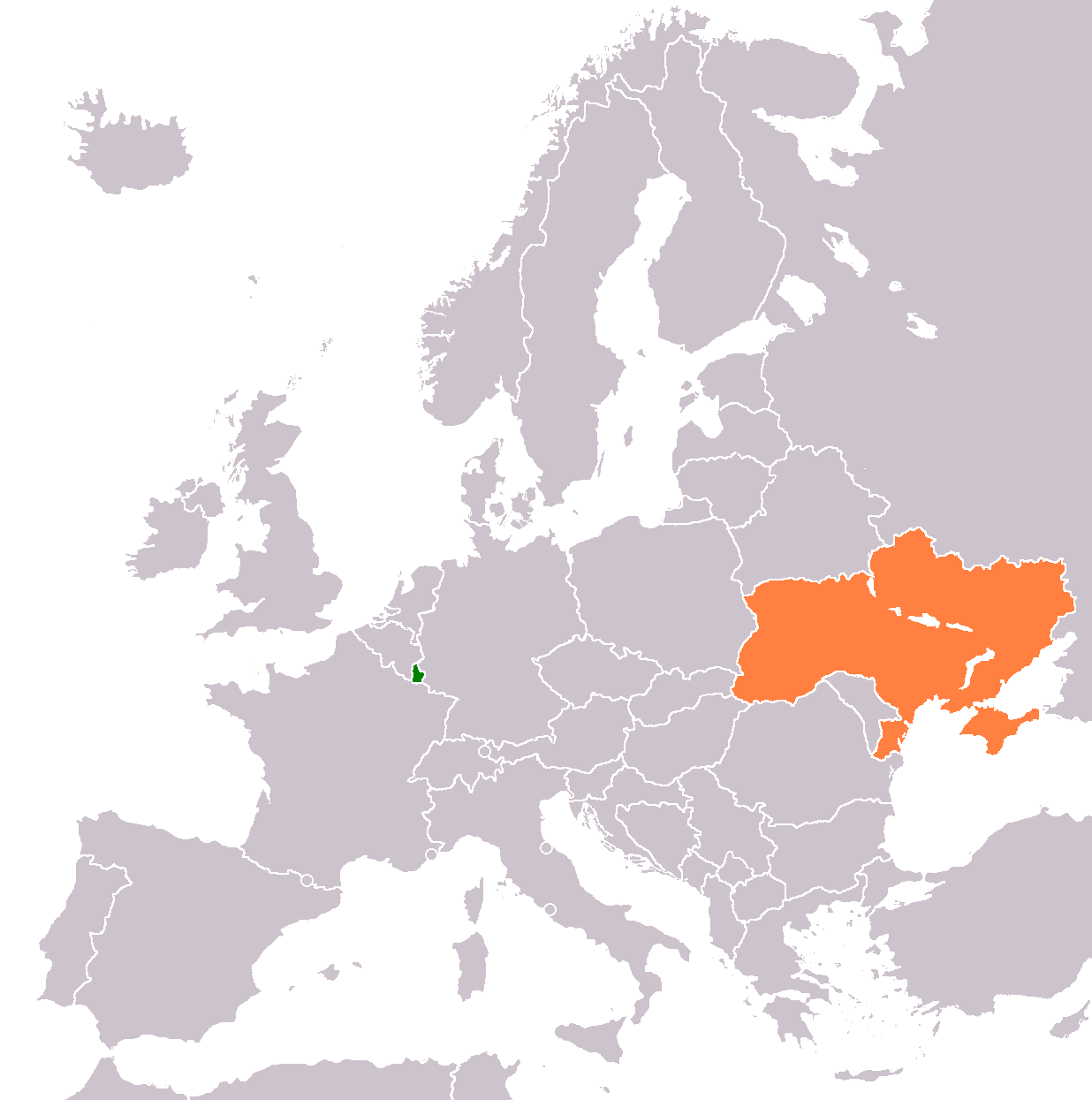

- Luxembourg: Ukraine

Luxembourg–Ukraine relations are the bilateral relations between Ukraine and Luxembourg.

Luxembourg is represented in Ukraine through the Embassy in Prague (Czech Republic). Ukraine is represented in Luxembourg through the embassy in Brussels (Belgium). Luxembourg is a member of the NATO and EU, which Ukraine applied for in 2022. Both countries are full members of Council of Europe.

== Luxembourg's recognition of Ukraine's state independence ==
The Grand Duchy of Luxembourg recognized the independence of Ukraine together with other EU countries on 31 December 1991. Diplomatic relations were established on 1 July 1992 by exchange of notes.

== Political dialogue ==
The political dialogue at the highest level was initiated by the visit of the President of Ukraine Leonid Kravchuk to Luxembourg on 14 June 1994, during which the Partnership and Cooperation Agreement between Ukraine and the European Communities and their Member States was signed.

In the 1990s, bilateral relations were closely linked to Ukraine's cooperation with the EU. This was primarily facilitated by the official visits of the Prime Minister of Luxembourg J.-C. Juncker to Ukraine (September 1997) and the Prime Minister of Ukraine V.P. Pustovoitenko to Luxembourg (June 1998), which were combined, respectively with the first EU-Ukraine summit and the first meeting of the Ukraine-EU Cooperation Council.

On 22 February 2005, President of Ukraine Viktor Yushchenko met with the Prime Minister of Luxembourg Jean-Claude Juncker in Brussels as part of a meeting of the NATO-Ukraine Commission at the highest level. On the occasion of the 4th meeting of the EU-Ukraine Cooperation Council in Luxembourg, on 26 June 2001, the Prime Minister of Ukraine A.K. Kinah had a bilateral meeting with the Prime Minister of Luxembourg J.-C. Juncker. On 18 June 2007, the Prime Ministers of Ukraine and Luxembourg V.F. Yanukovych and Jean-Claude Juncker met during the participation of the Prime Minister of Ukraine in the 11th meeting of the EU-Ukraine Cooperation Council in Luxembourg.

On 19 March 2009, within the framework of the European People's Party Summit in Brussels, the President of Ukraine Viktor Yushchenko and the Prime Minister of Ukraine Yulia Tymoshenko met with the Prime Minister of Luxembourg Jean-Claude Juncker. The parties discussed issues of bilateral relations, emphasizing the interest in expanding trade and economic cooperation between the two countries and Luxembourg's support for Ukraine's European integration policy.

On 16 June 2009, the Prime Minister of Ukraine, Yulia Tymoshenko, held bilateral talks with the Prime Minister of Luxembourg Zh.-K. Juncker as part of Yulia Tymoshenko's working visit to the Grand Duchy to participate in a meeting of the EU-Ukraine Cooperation Council. During her stay in Luxembourg, Yulia Tymoshenko was also received by the head of state, Grand Duke Henri of Luxembourg.

Meetings of the Ministers of Foreign Affairs of Ukraine and Luxembourg took place regularly as part of their participation in the sessions of the UN General Assembly and during their participation in other international events. An important part of the political dialogue was the launch in June 2003 of bilateral consultations at the level of foreign ministries. Since October 2008, the Luxembourg side has been participating as an observer in the work of the Ukrainian-Belgian Intergovernmental Joint Commission on Trade, Economic and Financial Cooperation.

Luxembourg-Ukrainian cooperation is based on a legal framework consisting of 4 agreements.

== Economic relations ==
Trade and economic cooperation between Ukraine and Luxembourg is characterized by trends similar to those in the development of cooperation with Belgium and the Netherlands. However, the global economic crisis has been reflected here before. In 2008, the turnover of goods and services amounted to 40.8 million US dollars, which indicated a decrease compared to 2007 by 29.7%, including Ukrainian exports amounted to 16.6 million US dollars, imports - 24.2 million US dollars. A positive trend is the reduction of Ukraine's negative trade balance with Luxembourg from 51.6 million US dollars in 2007 to 7.5 million US dollars in 2008.

As of 2009, the volume of direct investments in Ukraine from Luxembourg was amounted at $250 million US dollars. or 0.6% of total foreign direct investment in Ukraine. Almost half of Luxembourg's investments in Ukraine's economy are directed to wholesale trade (43%); followed by the chemical and petrochemical industries, real estate, renting, engineering and business services.

On 14 March 2017, the Verkhovna Rada of Ukraine finally ratified the Intergovernmental Convention between the Government of Ukraine and the Government of the Grand Duchy of Luxembourg on Avoidance of Double Taxation and Prevention of Tax Evasion with Respect to Taxes on Income and on Capital, signed on 6 September 1997.

== Scientific and technical cooperation ==
Cooperation in science and technology plays an important role in bilateral relations. In particular, in the framework of the implementation of the intergovernmental agreement on the training of banking professionals (since 1998) with the active participation of the Agency for the Transfer of Banking Technologies of Luxembourg (ATTF) and the National Bank of Ukraine. Representatives of the National Bank of Ukraine regularly participate in seminars on the functioning of international financial markets and the prevention of financial crime, which are held in Luxembourg. In addition, since 2005, seminars on this topic, organized with the assistance and at the expense of the Ministry of Finance of Luxembourg, have been held in Kyiv.

== Cooperation in education, science, culture, sports and tourism ==
Luxembourg-Ukraine cooperation in the field of education, science, culture, sports and tourism is carried out within the framework of the Agreement between the Government of Ukraine and the Government of the Grand Duchy of Luxembourg on cooperation in culture, education, science, youth, sports and tourism of 2 December 1994.

In order to fill the real content of this agreement, the parties developed a draft Program of Cooperation in Culture, Education, Science, Youth Policy, Sports and Tourism between the Cabinet of Ministers of Ukraine and the Government of the Grand Duchy of Luxembourg for 2009-2011. However, due to lack of funds for its implementation, the signing was postponed indefinitely at the initiative of the Ukrainian side.

== See also ==
- Foreign relations of Luxembourg
- Foreign relations of Ukraine
- Ukraine-NATO relations
- Ukraine-EU relations
  - Accession of Ukraine to the EU

== Literature ==
- Кривонос Р. А. Кудряченко А. І. Стан і перспективи співпраці України з країнами Бенілюксу // Україна в Європі: контекст міжнародних відносин: колективна монографія / За ред. А. І. Кудряченка. — К.: Фенікс, 2011. — С. 419—439.
