= List of diplomatic missions in Luxembourg =

This article lists diplomatic missions resident in Luxembourg. At present, the capital city of Luxembourg City hosts 23 embassies, and 2 embassy extension offices.

Several other countries have non-resident embassies accredited from other capitals, in particular Brussels and The Hague.

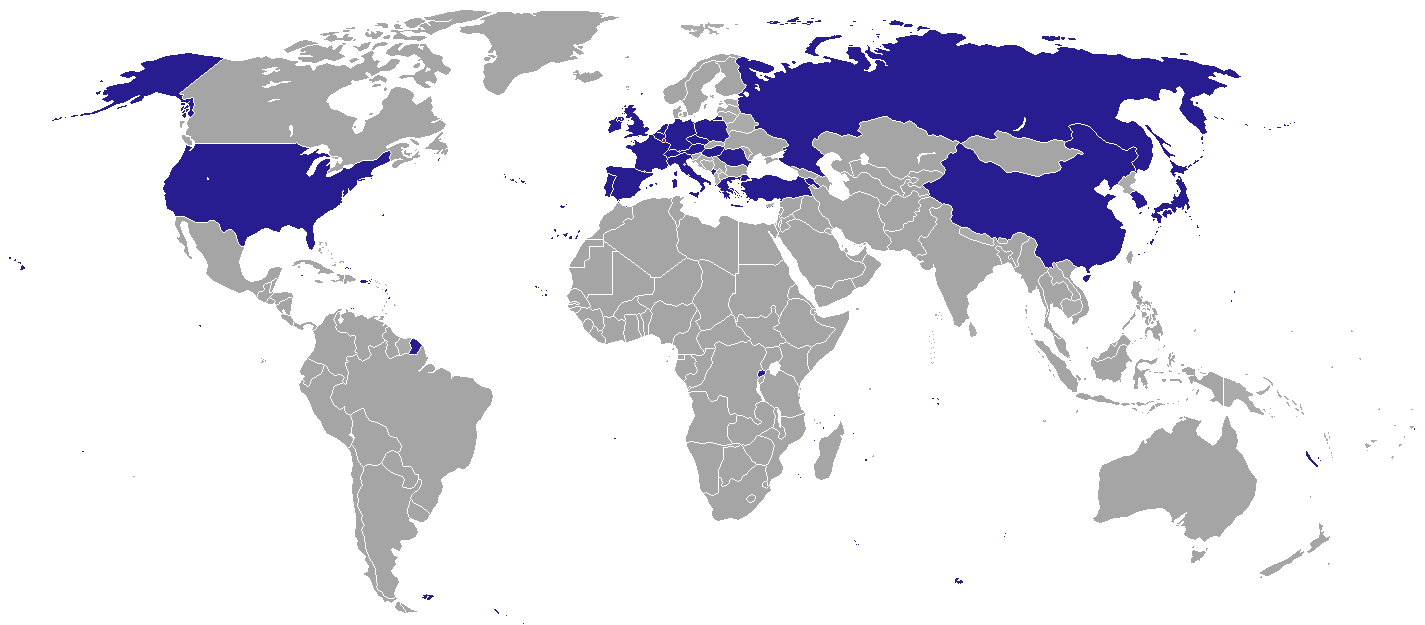
Map of diplomatic missions in Luxembourg

== Embassies in Luxembourg City ==
1. Austria
2. Belgium
3. Cape Verde
4. China
5. Czechia
6. France
7. Germany
8. Greece
9. Ireland
10. Italy
11. Japan
12. Netherlands
13. Poland
14. Portugal
15. Romania
16. Russia
17. Rwanda
18. South Korea
19. Spain
20. Switzerland
21. Turkey
22. United Kingdom
23. United States

== Embassy offices and other delegations in Luxembourg City ==
1. Armenia (Note: Subordinate to the embassy in Brussels, Belgium.)
2. Hungary
3. Montenegro

== Gallery ==
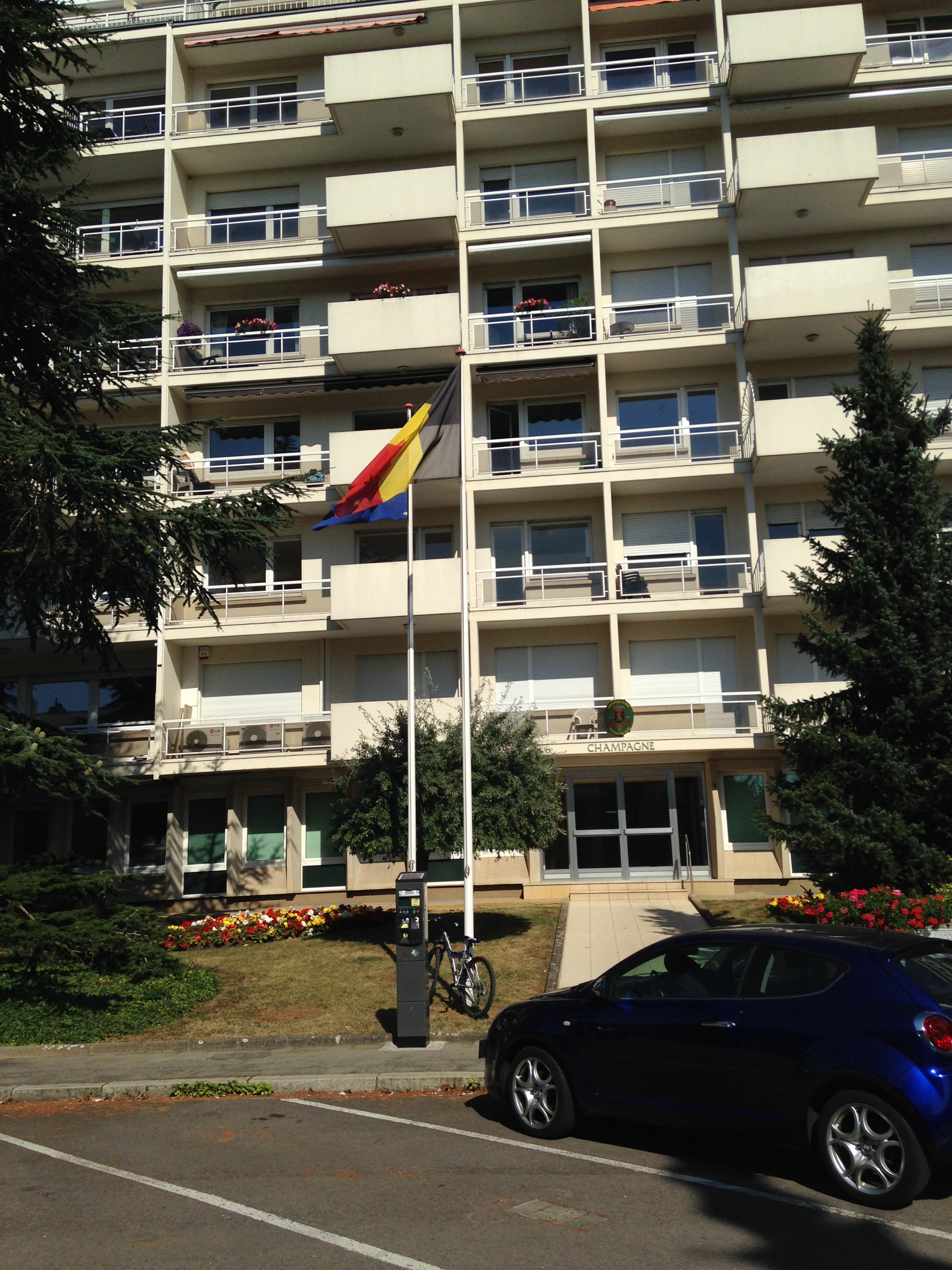
Embassy of Belgium

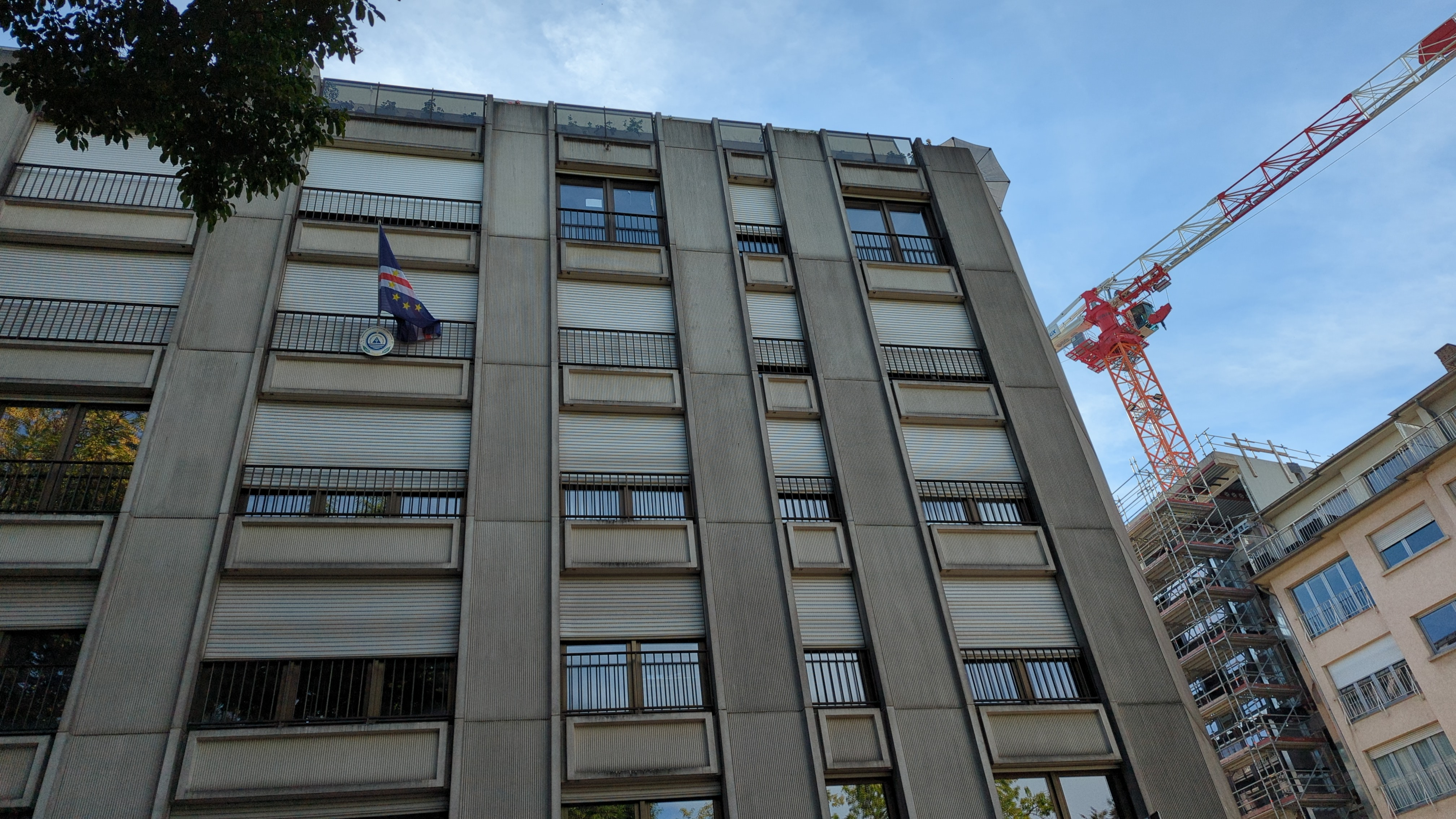
Embassy of Cape Verde

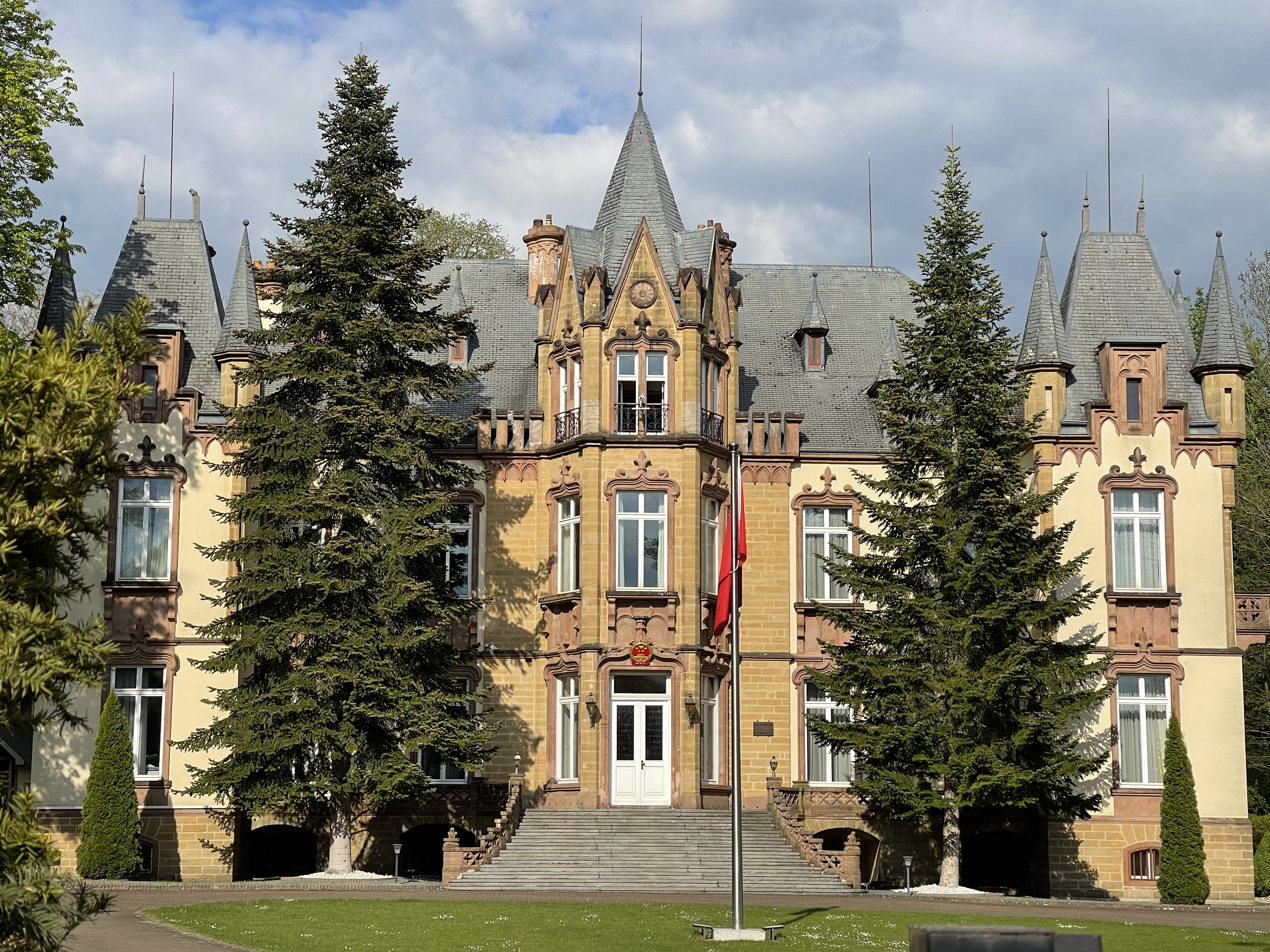
Embassy of China

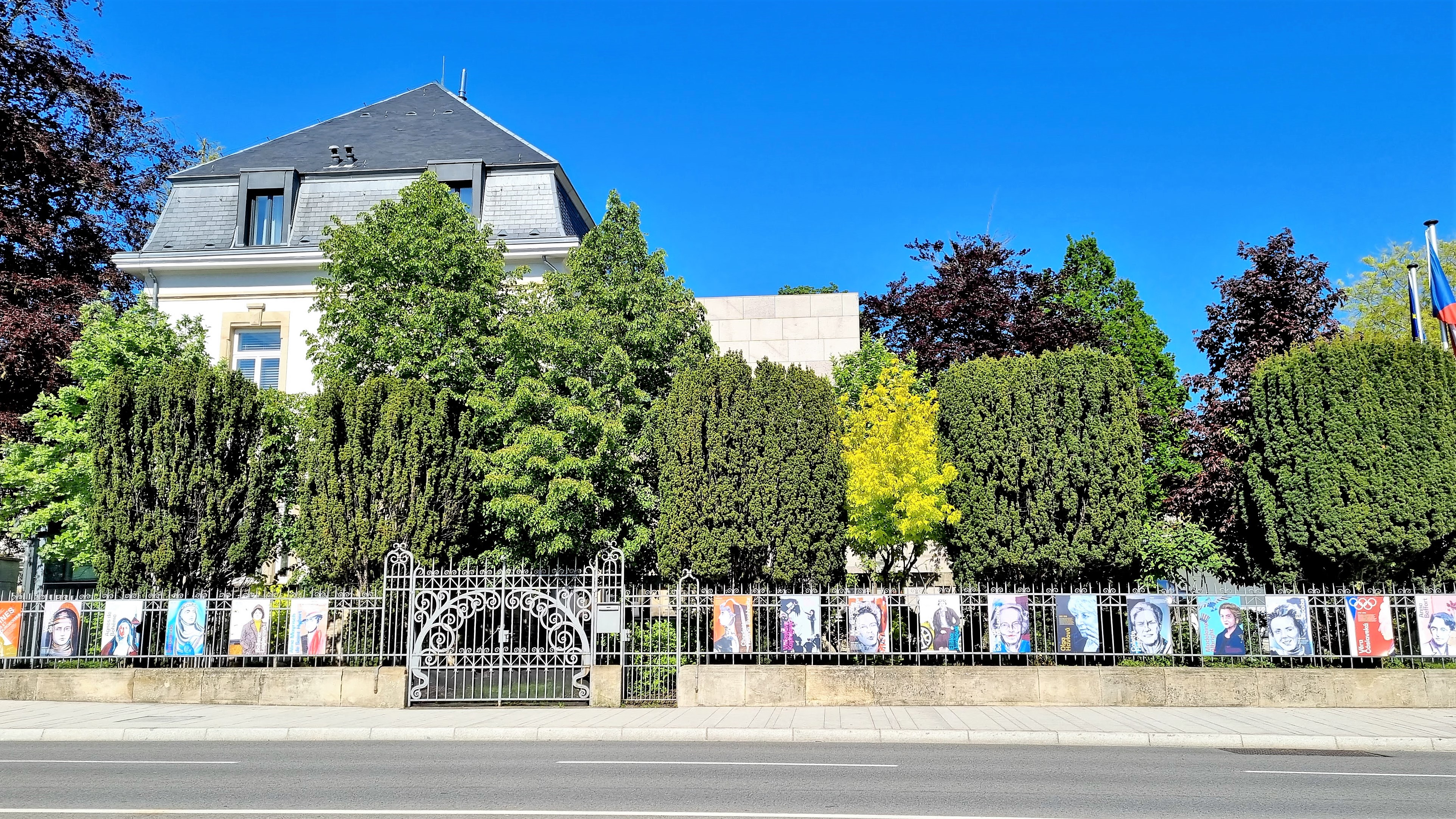
Embassy of the Czech Republic

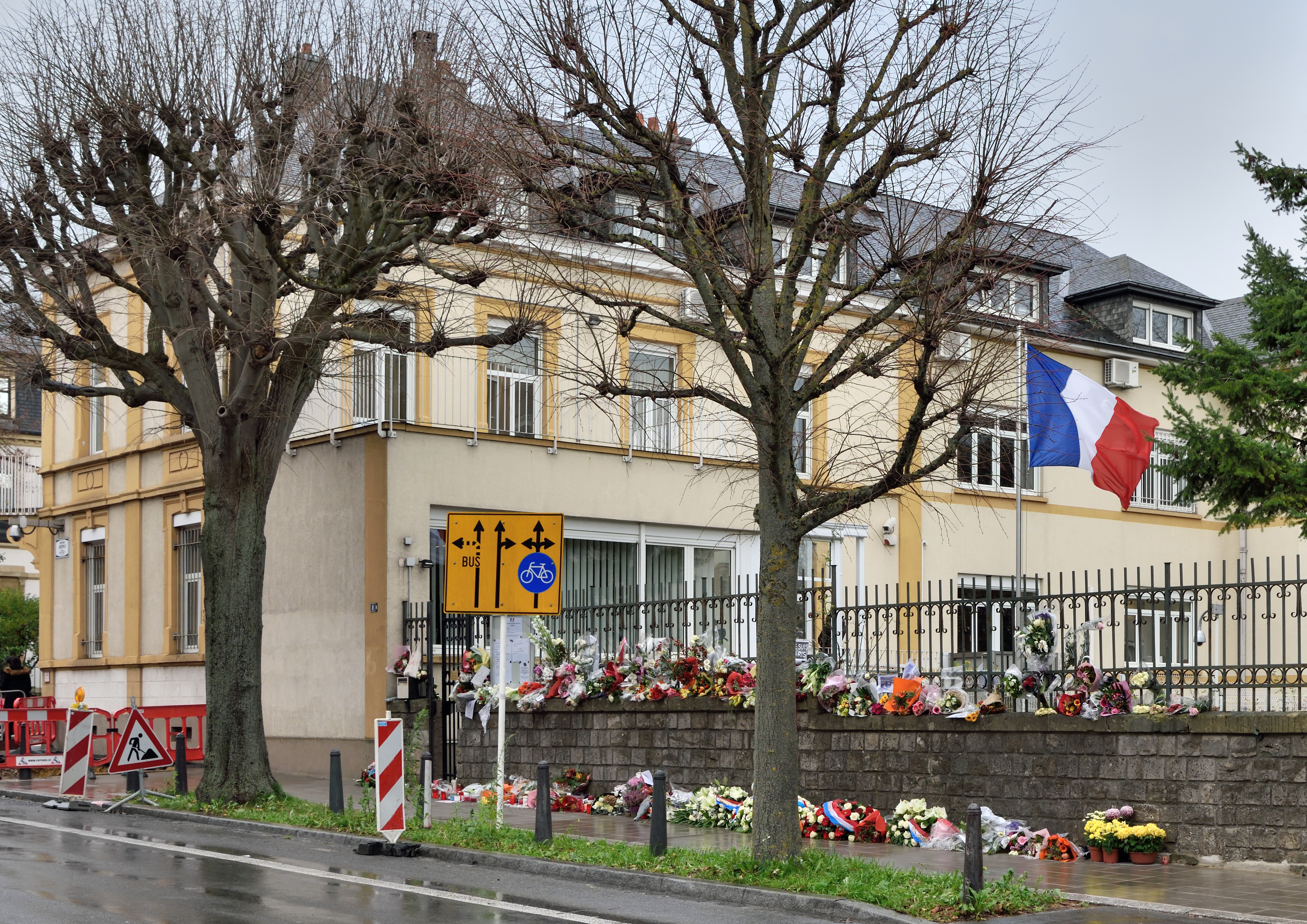
Embassy of France

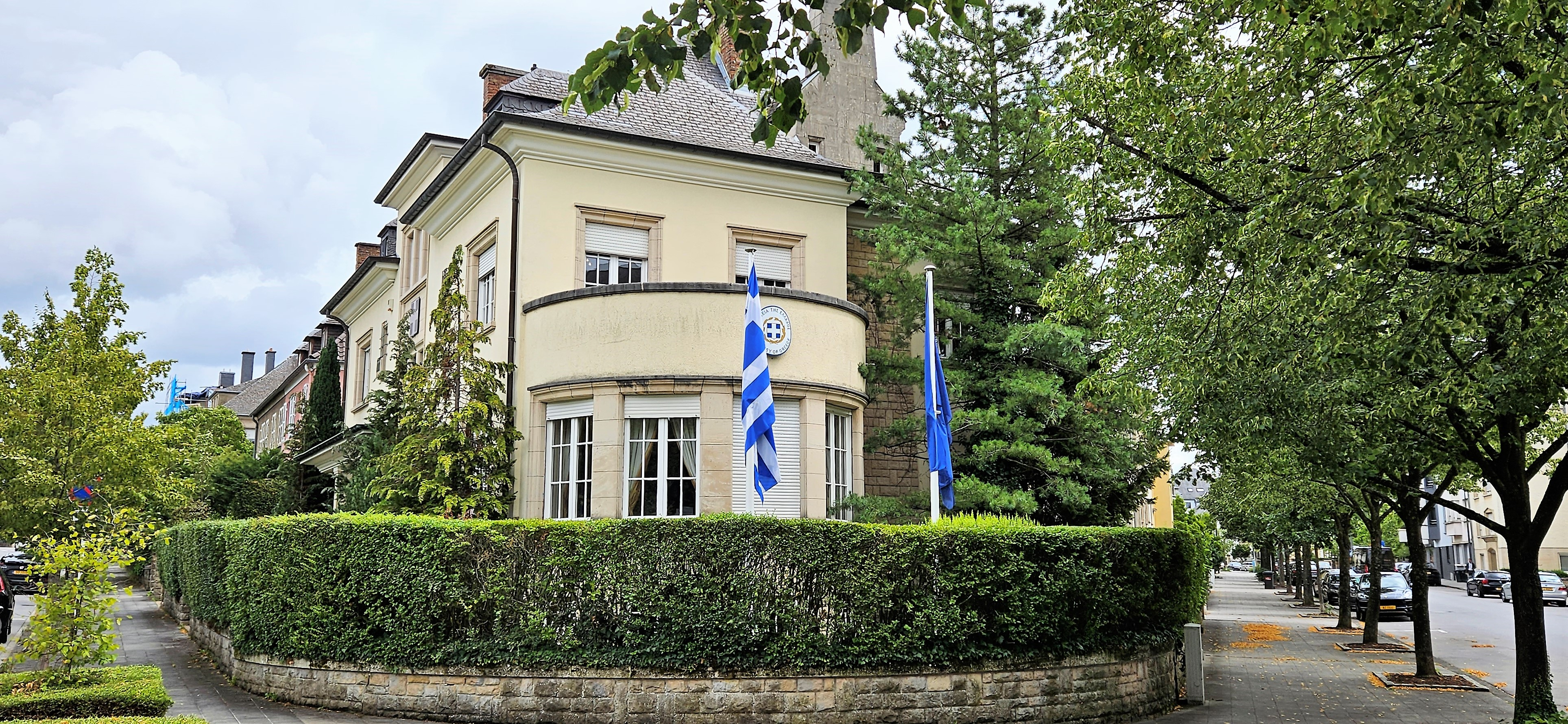
Embassy of Greece

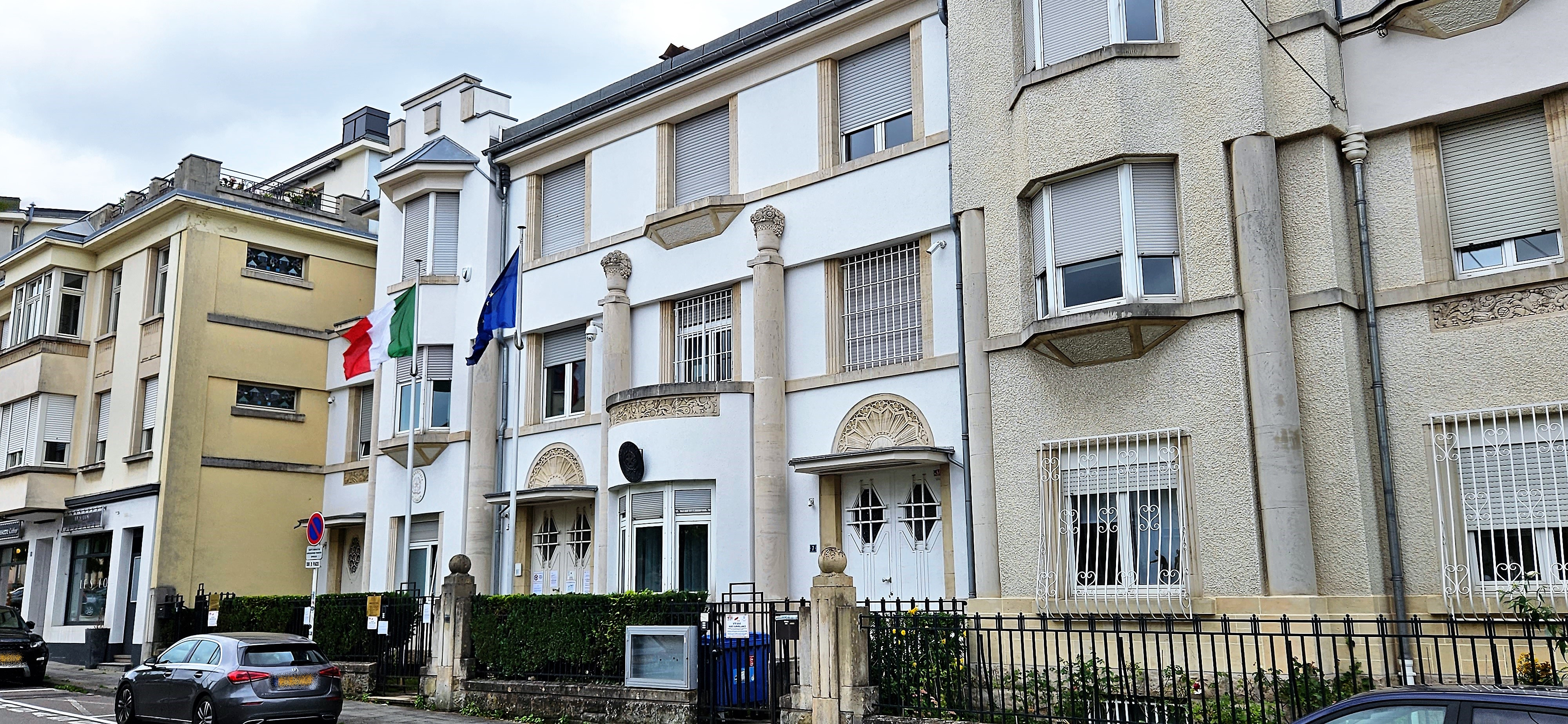
Embassy of Italy

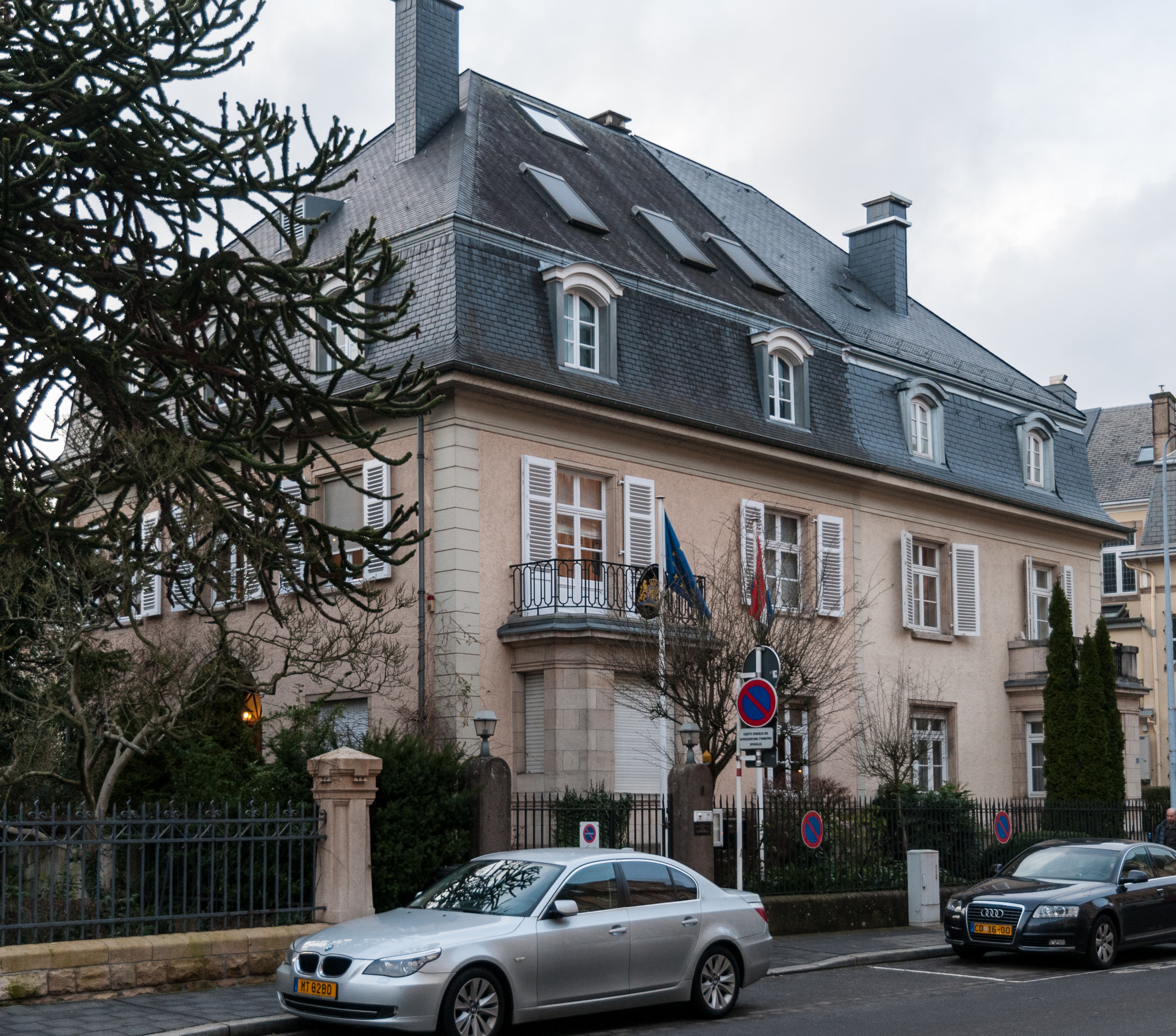
Embassy of the Netherlands

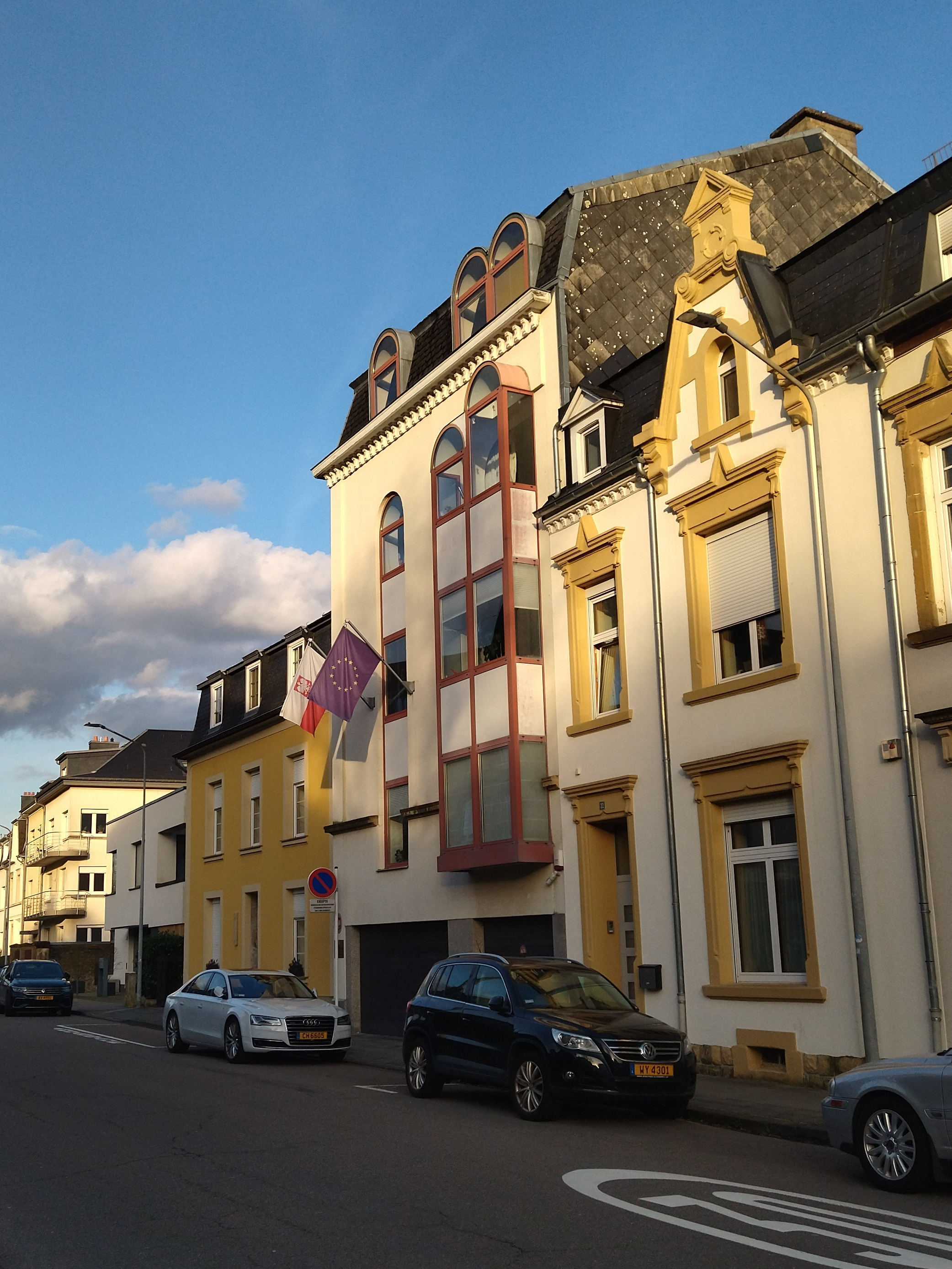
Embassy of Poland

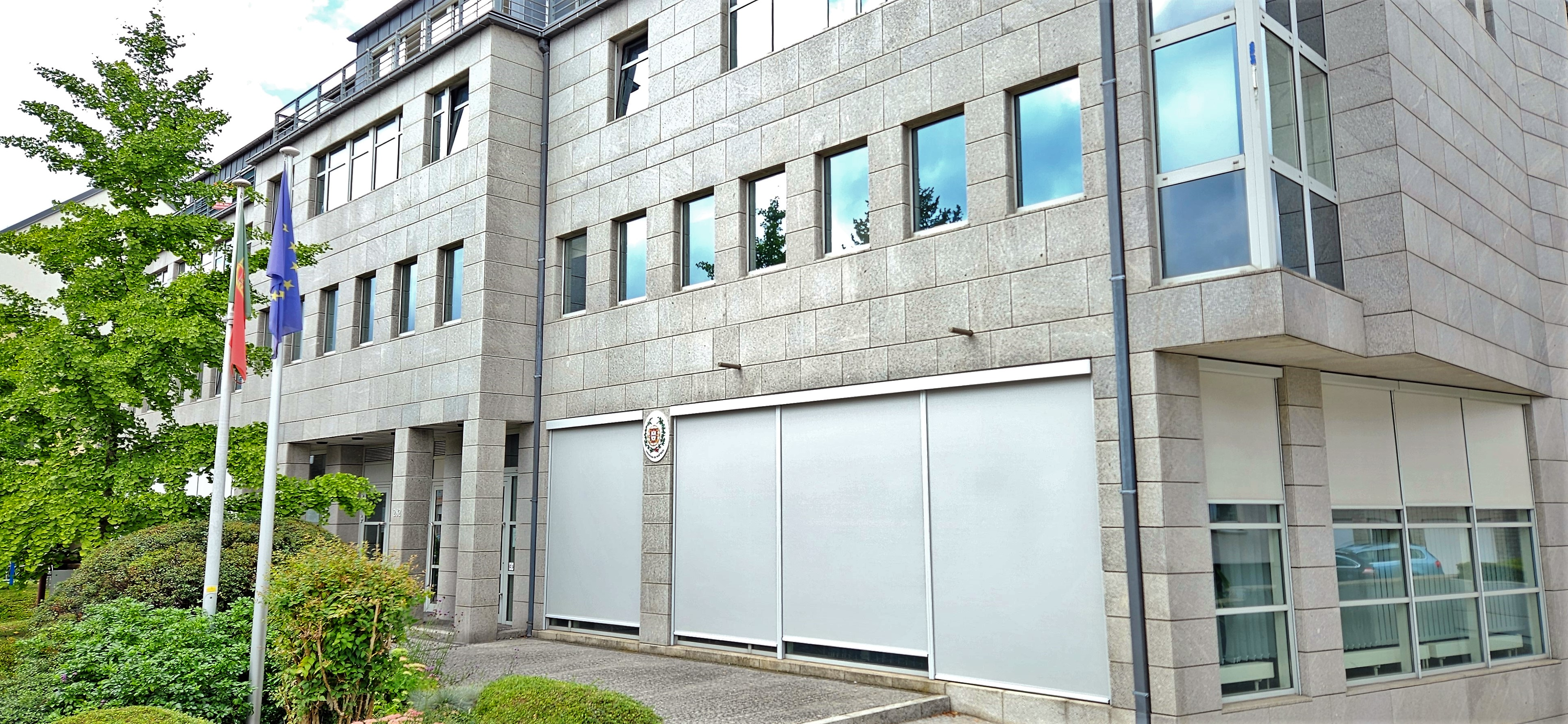
Embassy of Portugal

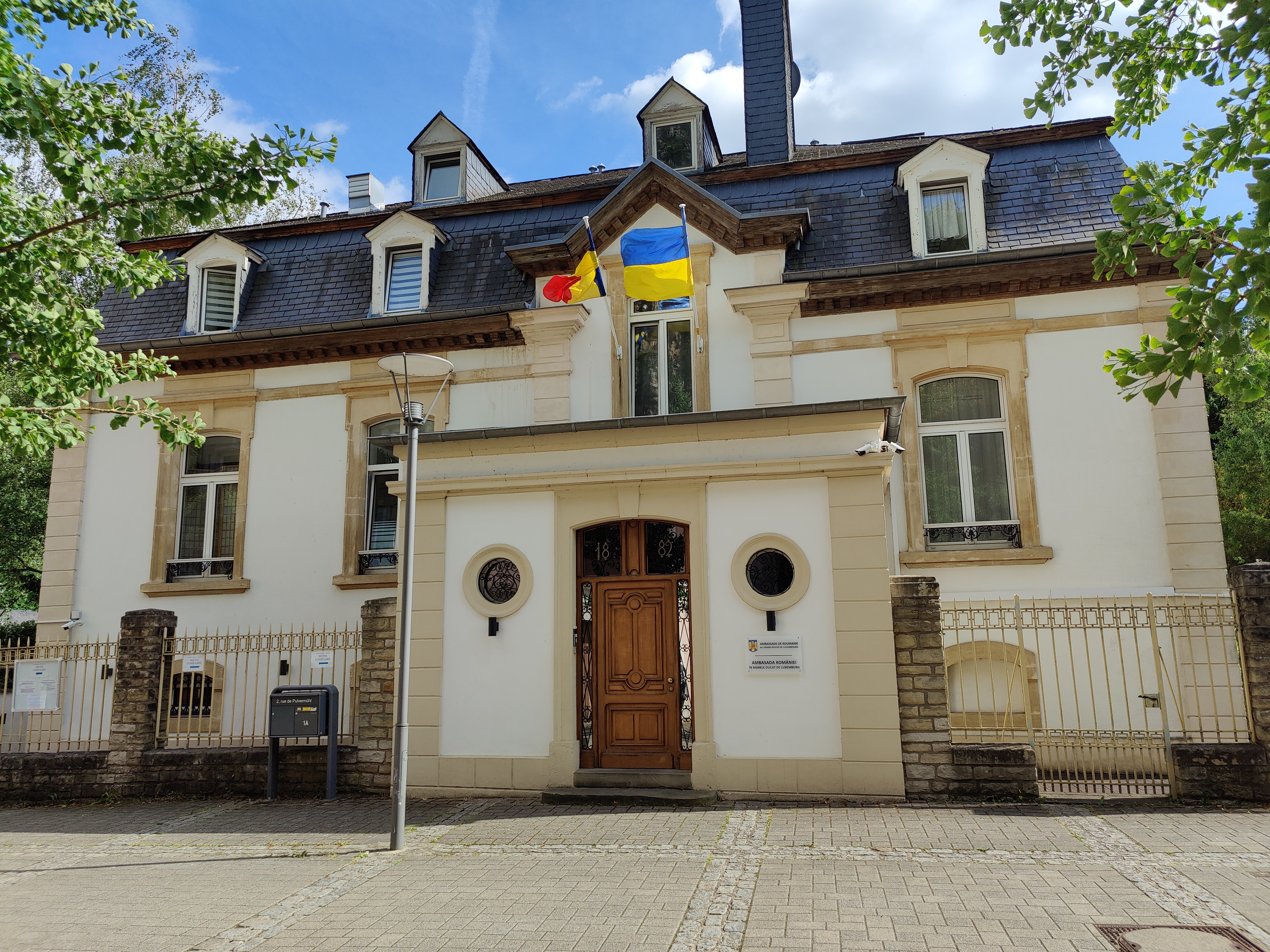
Embassy of Romania

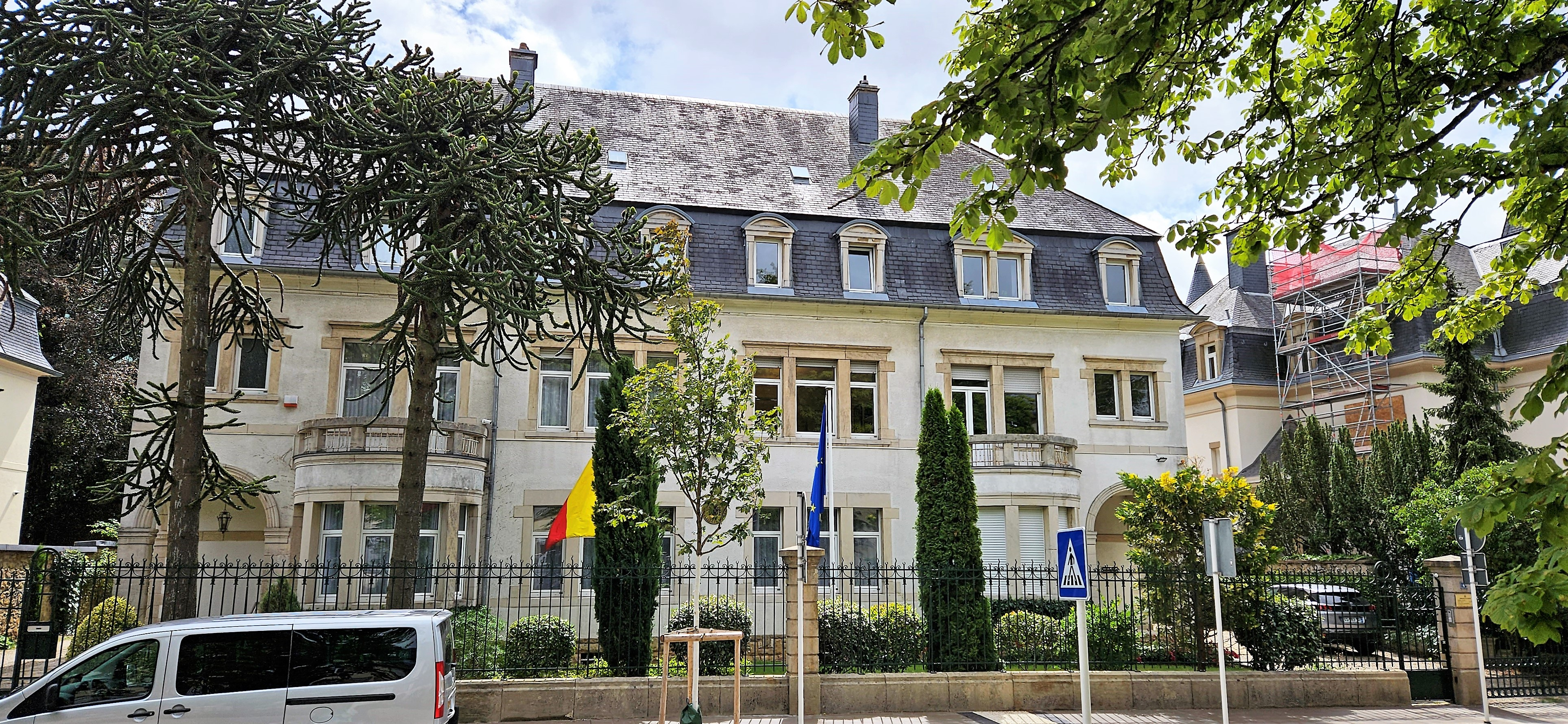
Embassy of Spain

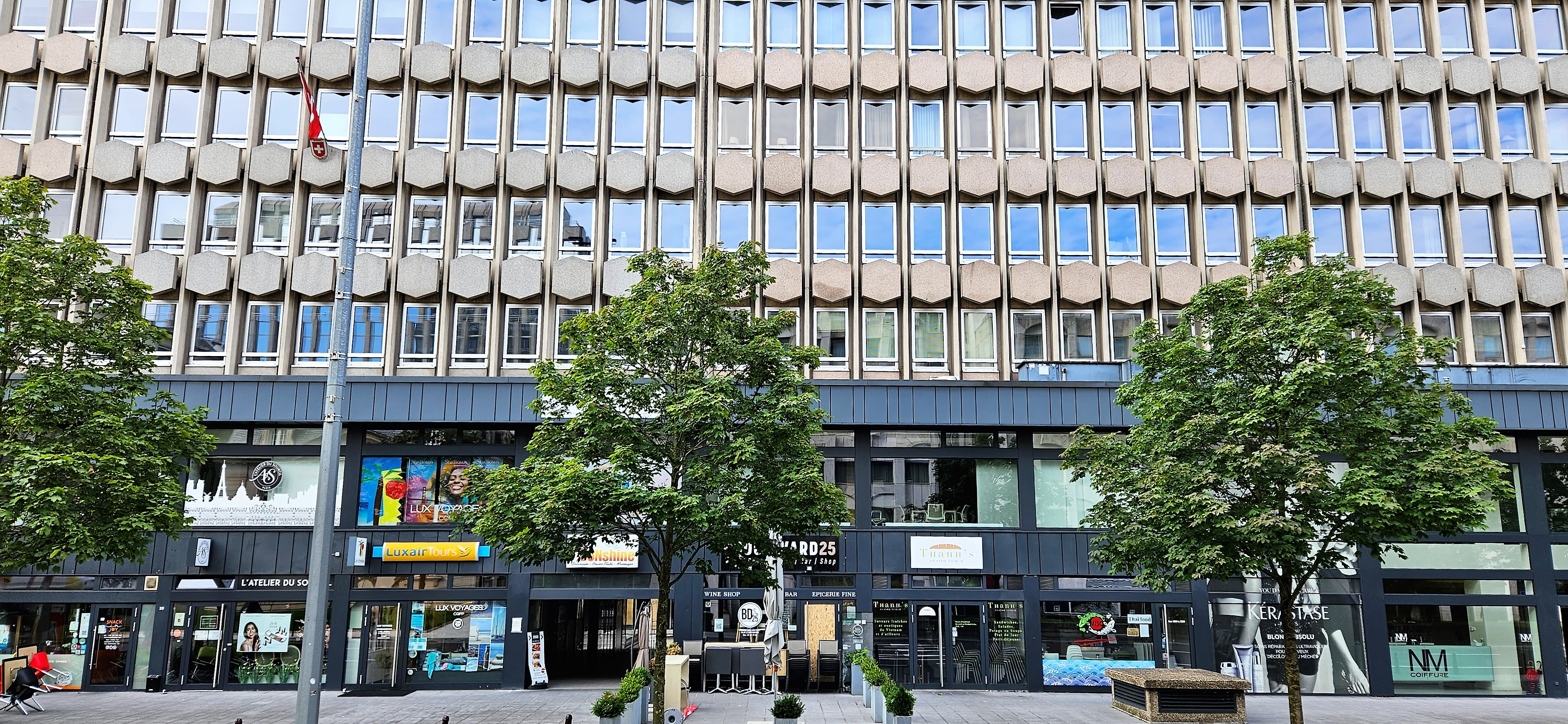
Embassy of Switzerland

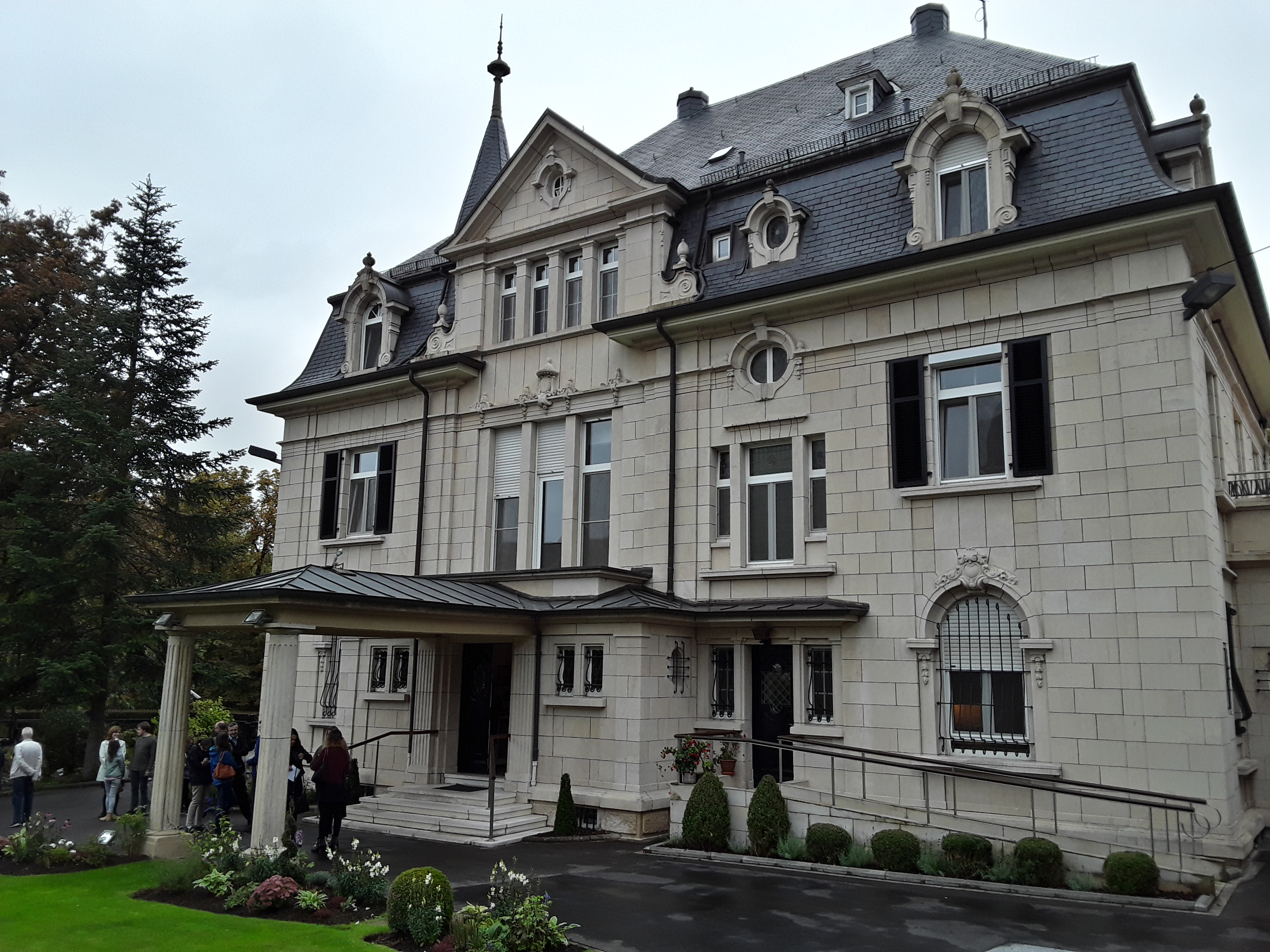
Embassy of the United States

== Accredited embassies ==
=== Resident in Brussels, Belgium ===
1. Afghanistan
2. Albania
3. Algeria
4. Andorra
5. Angola
6. Argentina
7. Armenia
8. Australia
9. Azerbaijan
10. Bahrain
11. Bangladesh
12. Barbados
13. Belarus
14. Belize
15. Bhutan
16. Bolivia
17. Bosnia and Herzegovina
18. Botswana
19. Brazil
20. Brunei
21. Bulgaria
22. Burkina Faso
23. Burundi
24. Cambodia
25. Canada
26. Central African Republic
27. Chad
28. Chile
29. Colombia
30. Comoros
31. Congo-Brazzaville
32. Congo-Kinshasa
33. Costa Rica
34. Croatia
35. Denmark
36. Djibouti
37. Dominica
38. Dominican Republic
39. Ecuador
40. Egypt
41. El Salvador
42. Equatorial Guinea
43. Eritrea
44. Estonia
45. Eswatini
46. Ethiopia
47. Finland
48. Gabon
49. Gambia
50. Georgia
51. Ghana
52. Guatemala
53. Guinea
54. Guinea-Bissau
55. Haiti
56. Holy See
57. Honduras
58. Hungary
59. Iceland
60. India
61. Indonesia
62. Iran
63. Iraq
64. Israel
65. Ivory Coast
66. Jamaica
67. Jordan
68. Kazakhstan
69. Kenya
70. Kosovo
71. Kuwait
72. Kyrgyzstan
73. Laos
74. Latvia
75. Lebanon
76. Lesotho
77. Liberia
78. Libya
79. Lithuania
80. Madagascar
81. Malawi
82. Malaysia
83. Mali
84. Malta
85. Mauritania
86. Mauritius
87. Maldives
88. Mexico
89. Moldova
90. Monaco
91. Mongolia
92. Montenegro
93. Morocco
94. Mozambique
95. Myanmar
96. Namibia
97. Nepal
98. New Zealand
99. Niger
100. Nigeria
101. North Macedonia
102. Pakistan
103. Panama
104. Papua New Guinea
105. Paraguay
106. Peru
107. Philippines
108. Qatar
109. São Tomé and Príncipe
110. Senegal
111. Serbia
112. Saudi Arabia
113. Seychelles
114. Sierra Leone
115. Singapore
116. Slovakia
117. Slovenia
118. South Africa
119. South Sudan
120. Somalia
121. Sri Lanka
122. Sudan
123. Sweden
124. Syria
125. Tajikistan
126. Tanzania
127. Thailand
128. Timor-Leste
129. Togo
130. Trinidad and Tobago
131. Tunisia
132. Turkmenistan
133. Uganda
134. United Arab Emirates
135. Ukraine
136. Uruguay
137. Uzbekistan
138. Venezuela
139. Vietnam
140. Yemen
141. Zambia
142. Zimbabwe

=== Resident in The Hague, Netherlands ===
1. Cameroon
2. Cuba
3. Cyprus
4. Norway
5. Oman

=== Resident elsewhere ===
1. Benin (Paris)
2. North Korea (Berlin)
3. San Marino (Paris)
4. Tonga (London)

=== Unconfirmed ===
- Fiji (Geneva)
- Grenada (Brussels)
- Kiribati (New York)
- Liechtenstein (Brussels)
- Micronesia (New York)
- Nicaragua (Berlin)
- Samoa (London)
- Solomon Islands (London)
- Tuvalu (New York)

== Non-resident delegations/representative offices ==
Resident in Brussels:

- Arab League
- Palestine (General Delegation)
- Republic of China (Representative Office)

== Closed missions ==
Host city	Sending country	Mission	Year closed	Ref.
Luxembourg City	Denmark	Embassy	2014	
Luxembourg City	Finland	Embassy	2015	
Luxembourg City	Sweden	Embassy	2010	

== Missions to open ==
Sending country	Host city	Mission	References
Brazil	Luxembourg City	Embassy	

== See also ==
- Foreign relations of Luxembourg
- List of diplomatic missions of Luxembourg
- Visa requirements for Luxembourgish citizens
