= Luxembourg–Mexico relations =

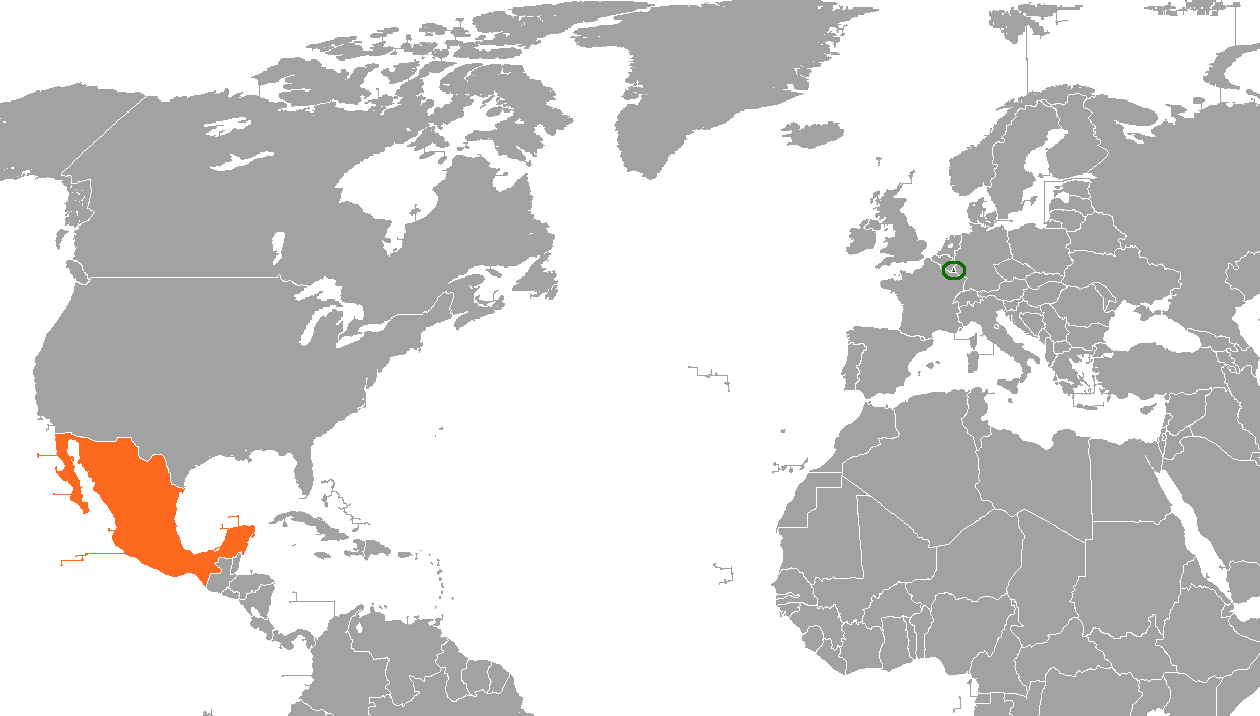

- Luxembourg: Mexico

The nations of Luxembourg and Mexico established diplomatic relations in 1947. Both nations are members of the OECD and the United Nations.

== History ==
Diplomatic relations between Luxembourg and Mexico were established in 1947. In 1980, Luxembourgish Prime Minister Pierre Werner paid an official visit to Mexico and met with President José López Portillo. During his visit to Mexico, both nations discussed and emphasized the energetic cooperation, especially in the iron and steel industry, and Luxembourg's participation in the Las Truchas Steel Project in the Mexican state of Michoacán. In March 1991, Foreign Minister Jacques Poos paid a visit to Mexico. In April that same year, Mexican Foreign Minister Fernando Solana paid an official visit to Luxembourg, becoming the first high-level representative of the Mexican government to visit Luxembourg.

In March 1996, Grand Duke Jean of Luxembourg paid an official visit to Mexico. While in Mexico, Grand Duke Jean met with President Ernesto Zedillo. In December 1997, Mexico and the European Union signed an Economic Partnership, Political Coordination and Cooperation Agreement. During the negotiations, Luxembourg, as an EU member state, played a neutral role and did not put obstacles. However, the ratification of the Agreement was stopped by the Luxembourgish government during 1998 and most of 1999 due to a tax dispute. The situation was resolved with the signing of an Agreement on the Avoidance of Double Taxation in January 2000 by both nations.

In April 2019, Luxembourgish Prime Minister Xavier Bettel paid an official visit to Mexico where he met with President Andrés Manuel López Obrador. During the visit, both leaders agreed to deepen trade and investment exchanges between both nations. They also agreed on the importance of the modernization of the Global Agreement between Mexico and the European Union. Prime Minister Bettel also addressed the Mexican Senate and called on lawmakers to advance LGBT and women's rights in Mexico.

In February 2023, Mexican Foreign Undersecretary, Carmen Moreno Toscano, paid a visit to Luxembourg and met with her counterpart Jean Olinger. The two discussed opportunities to strengthen the bilateral relationship between both nations by establishing a mechanism for political consultations.

== High-level visits ==
High-level visits from Luxembourg to Mexico

- Prime Minister Pierre Werner (1980)
- Minister of Foreign Trade Pierre Urbain (1990)
- Foreign Minister Jacques Poos (1991)
- Grand Duke Jean of Luxembourg (1996)
- Foreign Minister Lydie Polfer (2002)
- Minister of Finance Luc Frieden (2012)
- Prime Minister Xavier Bettel (2019)

High-level visits from Mexico to Luxembourg

- Foreign Minister Fernando Solana (1991)
- Foreign Undersecretary Carmen Moreno Toscano (2023)

== Bilateral agreements ==
Both nations have signed a few bilateral agreements, such as an Agreement to Eliminate Visa Requirements for Ordinary Passport Holders (1975); Agreement on Economic Cooperation (1984); Agreement on Air Transportation (1996); Agreement for the Promotion and Reciprocal Protection of Investments (1998); Avoid Double Taxation and Prevent Tax Evasion in the Matter of Income and Capital Taxes and Protocol (2001); Agreement for Cultural, Educational, Youth and Sports Cooperation (2006); and an Agreement for the Establishment of a Mechanism for Political Consultations on Matters of Mutual Interest (2023).

== Trade ==
In 1997, Mexico signed a Free Trade Agreement with the European Union (which includes Luxembourg). In 2023, trade between Luxembourg and Mexico totaled US$220 million. Luxembourg's main exports to Mexico include: sections of iron or non-alloy steel, electronics and machinery, trailers and semi-trailer vehicles, plastic, clothing, and chemical based products. Mexico's main exports to Luxembourg include: instruments and apparatus for regulating or controlling, minerals, chemical based products, plates, tiles and ceramics, telephones and mobile phones, electronics, tin ingots, rubber, and parts and accessories for motor vehicles.

In 2022, there were 98 Luxembourgish companies operating in Mexico with investments totaling US$340 million. Luxembourg steel company ArcelorMittal operates in Mexico, as well as Cargolux which operates scheduled cargo-flights between both nations. Mexican multinational companies such as Alsea and Cemex operate in Luxembourg.

== Diplomatic missions ==
- Luxembourg is accredited to Mexico from its embassy in Washington, D.C., United States and maintains honorary consulates in Mexico City and in Mérida.
- Mexico is accredited to Luxembourg from its embassy in Brussels, Belgium and maintains an honorary consulate in Luxembourg City.

== See also ==
- Foreign relations of Luxembourg
- Foreign relations of Mexico
