= Italy–Luxembourg relations =

- Italy: Luxembourg

Italy–Luxembourg relations are the bilateral relations between Italy and the Grand Duchy of Luxembourg. Both countries are members of the Organisation for Economic Co-operation and Development, European Union and NATO.

Italy was the second country to establish diplomatic relations with Luxembourg.

== Embassies ==
The Italian embassy inside of Luxembourg was established well over 100 years ago and it has been in the same building since 1933.

Luxembourg has an embassy in Rome.

== Economic relations ==
Italy ranks as Luxembourg’s fifth largest trading partner. Many Italian companies operate in Luxembourg.

== Visits ==
On June 3, 2025 Luxembourg's Deputy Prime Minister, Xavier Bettel paid a working visit to Italy.

== Resident diplomatic missions ==
- Italy has an embassy in Luxembourg City.
- Luxembourg has an embassy in Rome.

== See also ==
- Foreign relations of Italy
- Foreign relations of Luxembourg
- NATO-EU relations
