= Luxembourg–Russia relations =

- Luxembourg: Russia

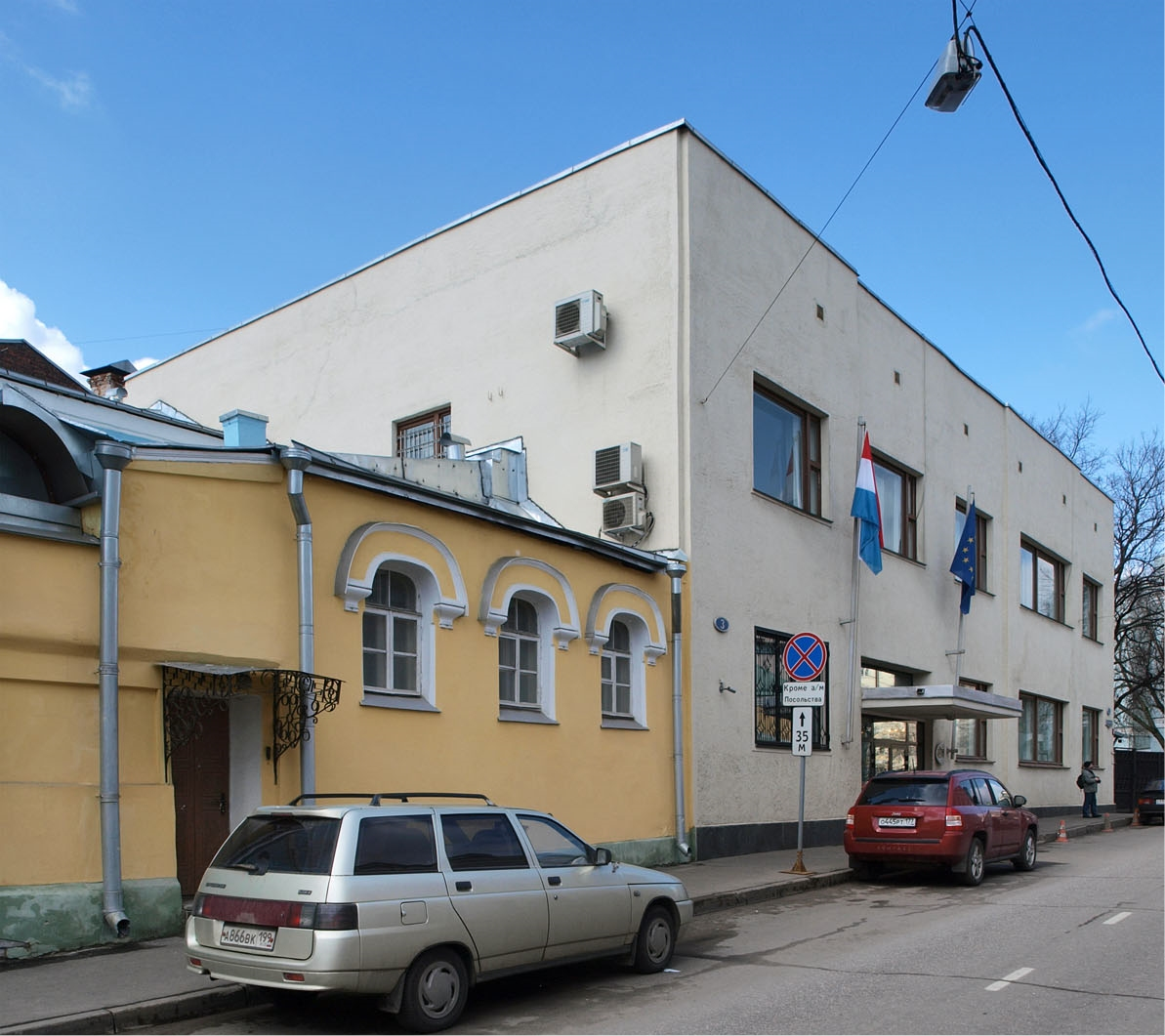
Luxembourg embassy in Moscow, Russia.

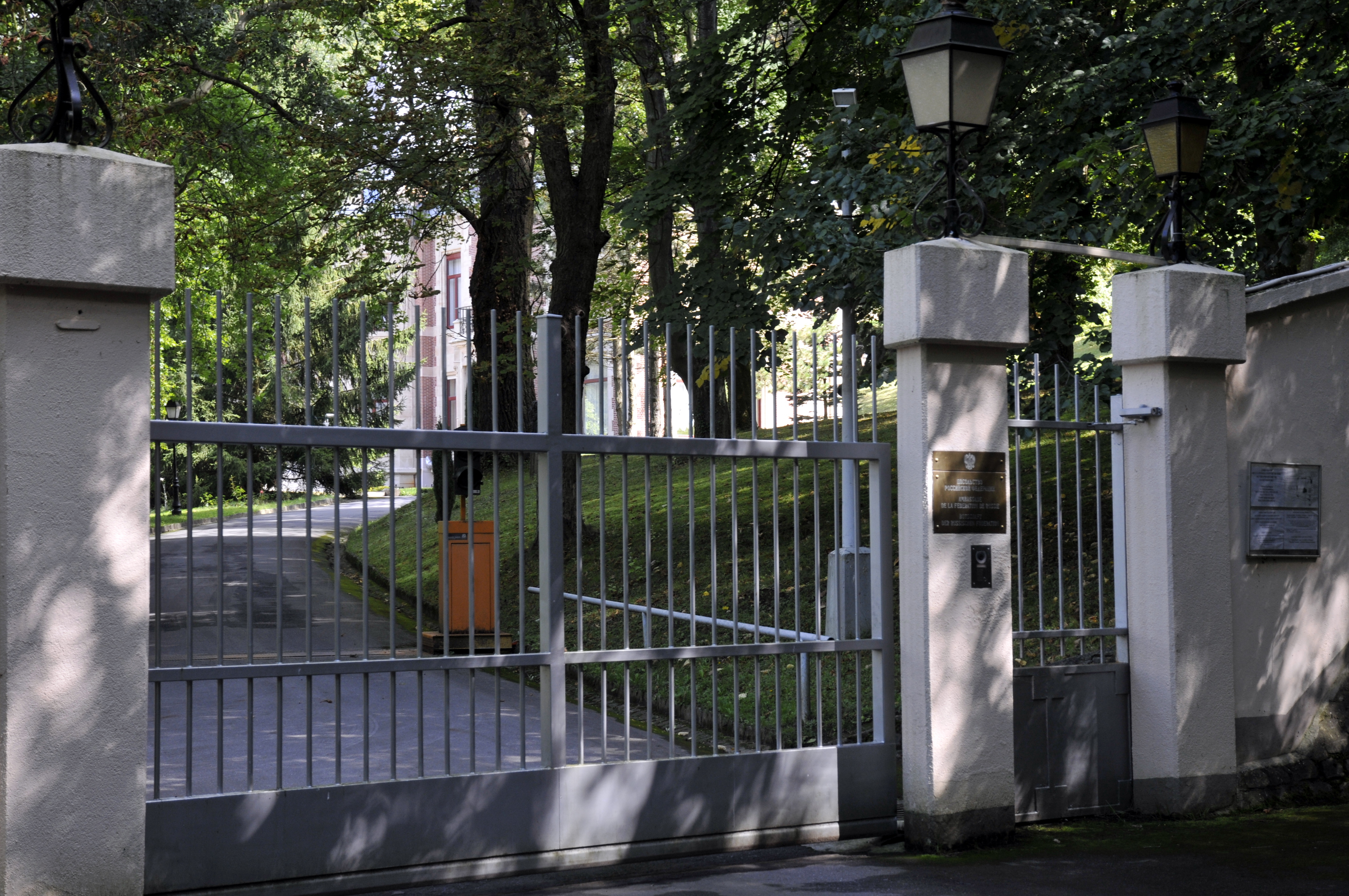
Russian embassy in Luxembourg.

Luxembourg–Russia relations are the bilateral foreign relations between the Grand Duchy of Luxembourg (member-state of the European Union) and the Russian Federation. Luxembourg has an embassy in Moscow and an honorary consulate in Saint Petersburg. Russia has an embassy in the city of Luxembourg.

Both countries are full members of the Organization for Security and Co-operation in Europe, and the United Nations.

In the history of bilateral relations, the first Russian president to come on an official visit to Luxembourg was Vladimir Putin on 24 May 2007.

== Economic relations ==
As bilateral trade had more than tripled from US$66.6 million in 2003 to US$228.3 million in 2006, time had come to strengthen the ties between the two countries, energy and finance being the key areas of cooperation between Russia and Luxembourg.

== Russian immigrant workers in Luxembourg ==
In 1926, about a hundred White émigré families, mostly former officers, came over from Bulgaria to Luxembourg to work mainly in the flourishing iron ore industry. Since 1982, the Grand Duchy has a Russian Orthodox Church. On 1 June 2008, there were 943 Russians registered in Luxembourg.

== 21st century ==
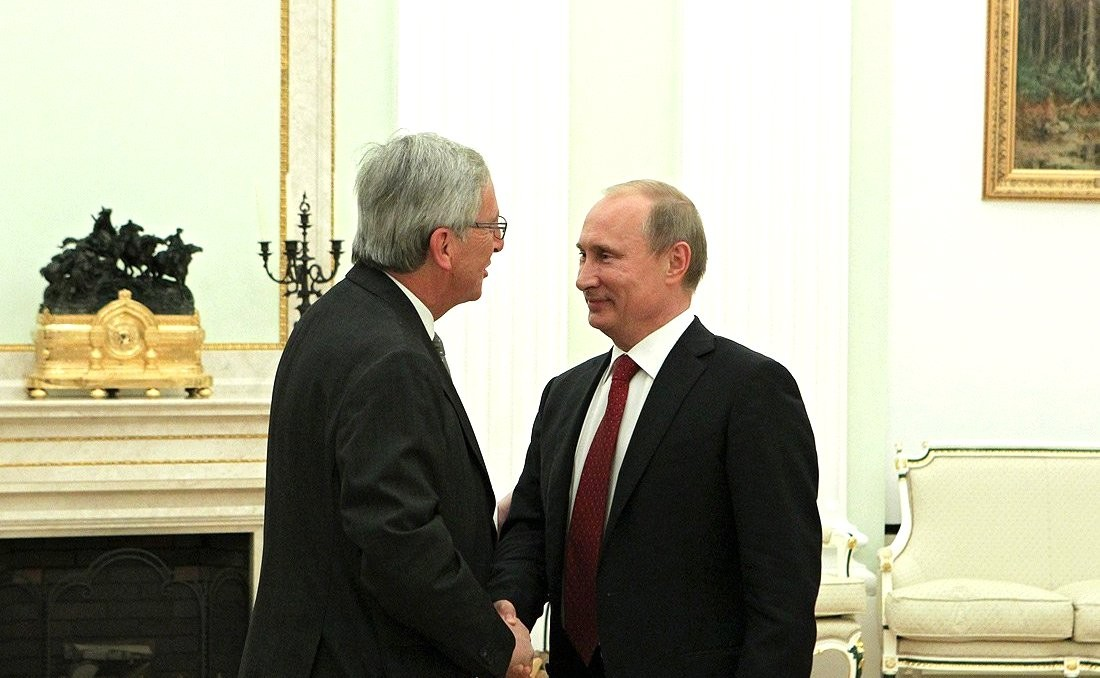
Luxembourgish Prime Minister Jean-Claude Juncker meets with Russian President Vladimir Putin in Moscow, 25 September 2012

During the 2008 South Ossetia War, Luxembourg claimed that Russia violated United Nations Security Council Resolution 1808, which Russia had voted for only a few months before. Luxembourg's criticism escalated especially after its recognition of Abkhazia and South Ossetia.

After the 2022 Russian invasion of Ukraine started, Luxembourg, as one of the EU countries, imposed sanctions on Russia, and Russia added all EU countries to the list of "unfriendly nations".

== Resident diplomatic missions ==
- Luxembourg has an embassy in Moscow.
- Russia has an embassy in Luxembourg City.

== See also ==
- Foreign relations of Luxembourg
- Foreign relations of Russia
- Russia-NATO relations
- Russia-EU relations
- List of ambassadors of Russia to Luxembourg
