= Australia–Luxembourg relations =

- Luxembourg: Australia

Australia–Luxembourg relations are the bilateral relations between the Commonwealth of Australia and the Grand Duchy of Luxembourg. Australia and Luxembourg formalized diplomatic relations on 18 September 1970 with the first appointment of Australia's ambassador in Brussels as non-resident ambassador to Luxembourg. The first ambassador presented credentials on 13 October 1970. Both countries are full members of the Organisation for Economic Co-operation and Development and share common values on human rights, climate change and disarmament.

== Diplomatic relations ==
Australia's Ambassador to the EU, NATO, Belgium and Luxembourg, Caroline Millar, presented credentials to H.R.H. the Grand Duke of Luxembourg in March 2022. Prime Minister Scott Morrison met Luxembourg Prime Minister Xavier Bettel during commemorations held in Portsmouth in June 2019 in Portsmouth for the 75th anniversary of the D-Day landings.

Australian Finance Minister Mathias Cormann met his Luxembourg counterpart, Pierre Gramegna, in March 2017 to discuss establishing a bilateral tax treaty, and Luxembourg's Foreign Minister Jean Asselborn in September 2016.

Luxembourg is represented in Australia through the embassy of the Netherlands in Canberra and through honorary consulates in Sydney and Melbourne.

== Economic relations ==
=== Trade and investment ===
Trade and investment figure strongly in the bilateral relationship. Luxembourg ranks as Australia's seventh largest investor with stocks valued at A$103 billion in 2021, with Foreign Direct Investments of $10 billion in Australia. Two-way services trade in 2020 was valued at A$137 million, while two-way goods trade amounted to A$48 million.

=== Tax treaty negotiations ===
Australia and Luxembourg are negotiating a bilateral tax treaty to encourage foreign investment and trade. The negotiations began following Luxembourg's compliance with OECD transparency standards, with Finance Minister Pierre Gramegna stating in 2017 that "Luxembourg is largely compliant and in the same category as Australia, the UK and the US" regarding tax transparency.

In a submission on the 2018–19 Federal Budget, the Financial Services Council recommended that "The Government place a priority on negotiating a tax treaty with Luxembourg", arguing that a free trade agreement with the European Union would see significantly diminished value in the absence of a tax treaty with Luxembourg, noting that "Luxembourg funds have about $US 4.5 trillion in net assets under management, by far the largest asset pool in Europe".

== Multilateral cooperation ==
Australia and Luxembourg work closely together in international organisations to promote global peace, security and human rights through effective multilateralism. Both countries share strong commitments on human rights, climate change and disarmament. They cooperate effectively in the UN Human Rights Council and share a commitment to the abolition of the death penalty.

Australia works with Luxembourg through the European Union in the World Trade Organization, sharing an interest in maintaining an effective international rules-based trading system. In the Indo-Pacific region, Australia collaborates with Luxembourg in the Asia-Europe Meeting (ASEM) and the ASEAN Regional Forum (ARF).

== Recent developments ==
=== EU-Australia Free Trade Agreement ===
Australia and the European Union launched negotiations for a bilateral free trade agreement in June 2018, with Luxembourg Foreign Minister Jean Asselborn noting "significant scope to further develop and deepen trade relations" between the countries. Australian ambassador Caroline Millar described Luxembourg as a "more significant partner than you would think" and called both countries "like-minded democracies with shared values and rule-based order".

=== Space cooperation ===
Both countries are founding signatories of the US Artemis Accords, a programme to return humans to the Moon by 2025. The Luxembourg Space Agency has signed agreements with the New South Wales government, with CEO Marc Serres expressing confidence in further space cooperation opportunities.

In February 2020, the State of New South Wales signed a Memorandum of Understanding with the Luxembourg Space Agency, establishing a framework for collaboration in space-related activities including exploration, exploitation and utilisation of space resources. The agreement covers cooperation in space applications including high-tech instrumentation, ground communications, smart payloads development, and commercialisation of space data, as well as space policy and law. The MOU builds on NSW's strengths in mining technology, robotics and automation, which align with Luxembourg's ambitions in space resource utilisation.

== People-to-people links ==
In 2017, the Australia-Luxembourg Working Holiday Arrangement entered into operation, allowing young Australians and Luxembourgers to travel and work in each other's countries for a one-year period. There is ongoing discussion about addressing social security and visa issues to facilitate greater mobility between the countries.

== See also ==
- Foreign relations of Luxembourg
- Foreign relations of Australia
