= Luxembourg–Vietnam relations =

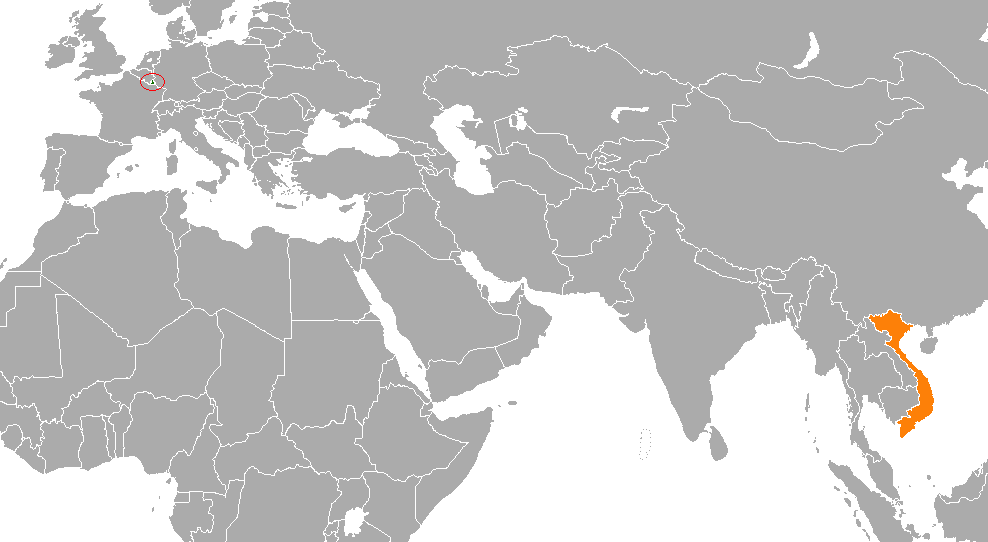

- Luxembourg: Vietnam

Luxembourg and Vietnam established diplomatic relations in 1973. Luxembourg's representation in Vietnam is through its embassy in Beijing, China. Vietnam is represented through its embassy in Brussels, Belgium.

== Mutual international support ==
In December 2008, Vietnam called on Luxembourg to support its ties with European Union. For its part, Vietnam is backing Luxembourg's candidacy for the post of non-permanent member at the UN Security Council.

== Trade links ==
Vietnam is one of the ten key countries in Luxembourg's development cooperation program. The countries have agreed to build a legal framework to facilitate business ties. At a meeting between Vietnamese Prime Minister Nguyễn Tấn Dũng and his Luxembourg counterpart, Jean-Claude Juncker, in September 2006, the two Prime Ministers agreed the need to boost bilateral trade ties based on the combination of Luxembourg's advanced technology and Vietnam's intensive labour force. Nguyễn Tấn Dũng, in October 2007, praised the cooperation by Luxembourg companies in finance and education and expressed the wish to boost bilateral ties with Luxembourg in these areas. In December 2008, according to Vietnam National Assembly Chairman Nguyễn Phú Trọng, there was still much potential for further economic and commercial co-operation.

== Development Cooperation ==
Luxembourg pledged EUR35 million in aid for the 2002-05 period.

== Resident diplomatic missions ==
- Luxembourg is accredited to Vietnam from its embassy in Beijing, China.
- Vietnam is accredited to Luxembourg from its embassy in Brussels, Belgium.

== See also ==
- Foreign relations of Luxembourg
- Foreign relations of Vietnam
