= PTAT-1 =

1989 fiber optic telecommunications cable

PTAT-1 was the first privately financed transatlantic fiber optic telecommunications cable. Completed in 1989 at a cost of US$600 million and maintained by Cable & Wireless (C&W) and Sprint/Private TransAtlantic Telecommunication Systems, Inc. (PSI, Inc.), it connected Manasquan, New Jersey, United States, with Devonshire, Bermuda, and Ballinspittle, Republic of Ireland, terminating at Brean, England, United Kingdom, for a distance of 7,552 kilometres (4,693 miles; 4,078 nautical miles).

PTAT-1 is notable for breaking the international telecommunication monopoly held by AT&T Corporation and British Telecom (BT) for telecommunications between the US and UK, and setting off the mass production of fiber optic systems that now circle the world.

PTAT-1 was built by a joint venture of a small private US company, Private TransAtlantic Telecommunication Systems, Inc. (PSI, Inc., founded as Tel-Optik in 1984) and Cable & Wireless plc of the UK. The submarine cable system and line terminal equipment were provided by Standard Telephones and Cables (STC), and alarm and control system management by International Computers Limited (ICL). The US shore end was built by Lightwave Spectrum. On August 15th, 1989, US Sprint Corp. acquired 100% of PSI, Inc., and thereby acquired 50% interest in PTAT-1.

The UK to US section of the cable was shut down just after 02:00 hours on 8 February 2004, as it was no longer considered financially viable by Cable & Wireless. Competitors to the cable had dropped their prices drastically after they re-emerged from Chapter 11 Bankruptcy with little or no debts to service, something C&W was unable to compete with.

This cable provided intelligent repeaters that monitored and reported bit errors when queried by a base station. It included three fiber pairs, supporting two active channels. Each repeater had a base-station-controlled switch that could direct traffic between two fiber pairs, allowing flexible connections and a backup path if needed.
