= Luxembourg–Spain relations =

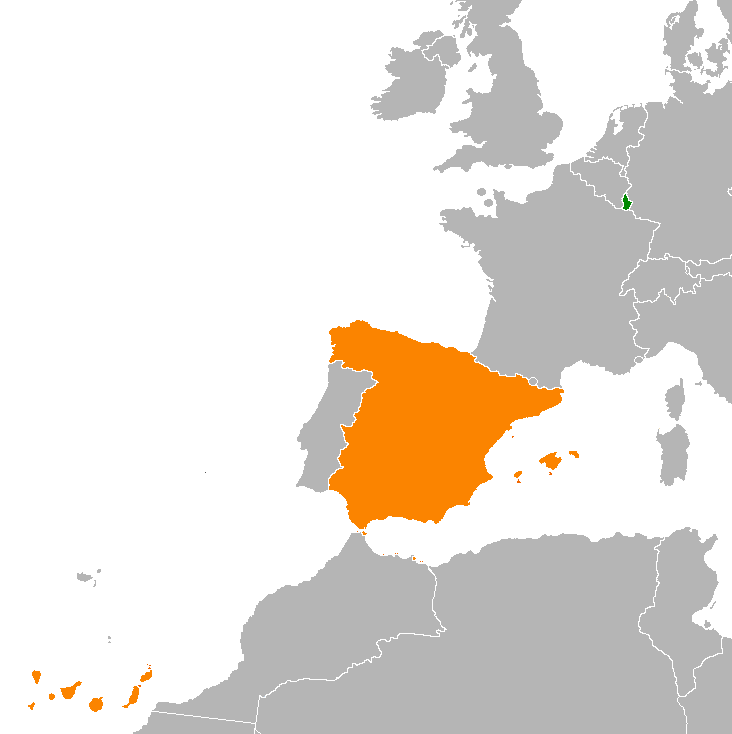

- Luxembourg: Spain

Luxembourg–Spain relations are the bilateral and diplomatic relations between these two countries. Both countries are members of the European Union, NATO and Organization for Security and Co-operation in Europe. Luxembourg has an embassy in Madrid Spain has an embassy in Luxembourg City.

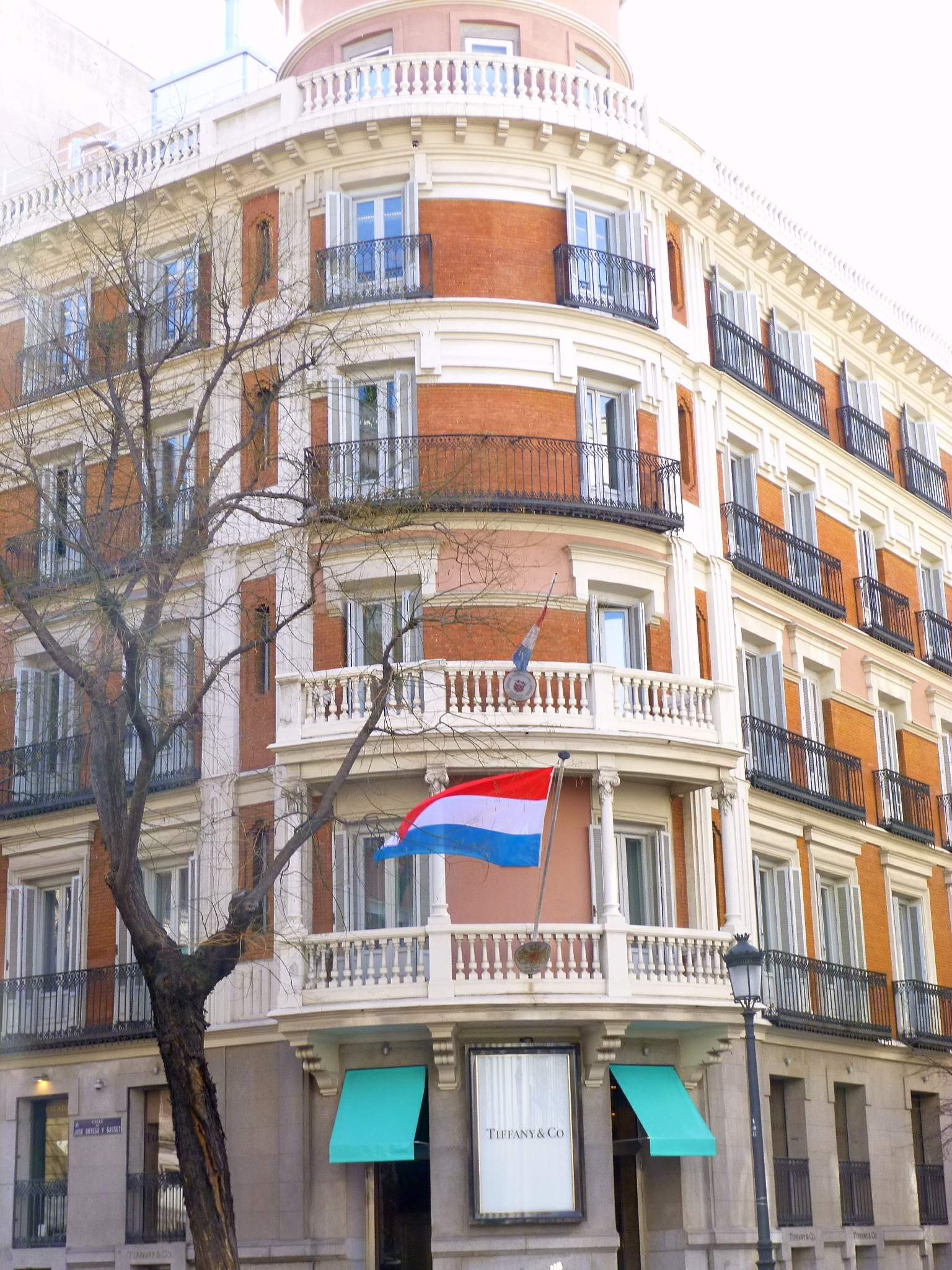
Embassy of Luxembourg in Madrid

== Diplomatic representation ==
The Ministry of Education of the embassy of Spain (with residence in Brussels, accredited for Belgium, the Netherlands and Luxembourg) has an office in the consular building of the embassy of Spain in Luxembourg and a Resource Center located in the only classroom of Spanish language and culture in Luxembourg capital.

In this service, consultancy, reporting, consultation, teacher training, organization of cultural activities, contacts with the Luxembourg administration and support to the numerous initiatives of the embassy of Spain related to the promotion of Spanish are fundamentally carried out. Classes are also given for children of Spanish citizens residing in Luxembourg, within the framework of the so-called "Spanish language and culture classroom"

== Economic relations ==
The good short- and medium-term forecasts of the Luxembourg economy make it predictable that economic relations with Spain will continue on the same path or even improve in the coming years. At the same time, there are possibilities for cooperation in a significant number of sectors with great development potential in Luxembourg such as: communications and audiovisual production; Logistics; Investigation and development; building; agrifood sector and everything related to financial services and products.

In addition, since Luxembourg is the seat of institutions of the European Union, an increase in the participation of Spanish companies in the numerous tenders that are convened can also be foreseen, in addition to being the headquarters of the NATO Agency for purchases and supplies (NSPA) .

== Cooperation ==
Luxembourg is not a recipient of Spanish development cooperation. It is worth mentioning that in 2007 contacts were maintained between the Cooperation Spanish and Luxembourgian to study a possible joint action in some third country (eventually in Central America).

== High level visits ==
In January 2007, the Minister of Foreign Affairs and Cooperation of Spain held a working visit to Luxembourg, especially marked by European affairs. In June of the same year, Prime Minister Juncker traveled to Spain, where he met, among other authorities, with the Minister of Economy.

The most relevant event of the year from the bilateral perspective was the state visit of SSMM los Reyes in April 2007. The Kings maintained high-level contacts with the Spanish community and visited the headquarters and industrial facilities of companies with capital Spanish and Luxembourg, such as Arcelor-Mittal and SES-Global.

They opened an important exhibition dedicated to Pedro Ernesto de Mansfeld, Spanish governor of Luxembourg (and after the Netherlands) at the time of Philip II and Philip III. For its part, SS.MM. Reyes Felipe and Letizia returned to Luxembourg for a day-long visit in November 2014; during the same lunch with the grand dukes and the heirs, and held hearings with the president of the government, the president of the Chamber of Deputies and the Minister of Foreign Affairs.

== Transport links ==
Luxair and Ryanair operate flights to Spain from Luxembourg Airport.

== Resident diplomatic missions ==
- Luxembourg has an embassy in Madrid.
- Spain has an embassy in Luxembourg City.

== See also ==
- Foreign relations of Luxembourg
- Foreign relations of Spain
