= Rob Frieden =

American lawyer

Rob Frieden holds the Pioneers Chair and serves as Professor of Telecommunications and Law at Penn State University in the United States. Frieden holds a B.A., with distinction, from the University of Pennsylvania (1977) and a J.D. from the University of Virginia (1980).

Before accepting an academic appointment, Frieden practiced law in Washington, D.C., and served as Assistant General Counsel at PTAT Systems, Inc. where he handled corporate, transactional and regulatory issues for the nation's first private undersea fiber optic cable company. He continues to provide legal, management and market forecasting consultancy services.

He has held senior policy making positions in international telecommunications at the United States Federal Communications Commission and the National Telecommunications and Information Administration.

Frieden is listed in a number of Who's Who publications including Who's Who in American Law.

== Publications ==
Frieden has written several books, Managing Internet-Driven Change in International Telecommunications and The Cable and Satellite Television Industries co-authored with Patrick Parsons and awarded the 1999 Cable Book Award. His latest book Winning the Silicon Sweepstakes: Can the United States Compete in Global Telecommunications was published by Yale University Press in 2010.

Additionally, Professor Frieden updates a major communications treatise: All About Cable and Broadband (Law Journal Press).

=== Journal articles ===
Frieden has published over sixty articles in academic journals. See Frieden Web Page.

Additionally, Professor Frieden has provided commentary in a variety of media including BusinessWeek, The Christian Science Monitor, the Philadelphia Inquirer and the News Hour with Jim Lehrer.

=== Other publications ===
Frieden also has presented papers and moderated sessions in numerous forums throughout the world.

Before accepting an academic appointment, Professor Frieden provided a broad range of business development, strategic planning, policy analysis and regulatory functions for the IRIDIUM mobile satellite venture.

He received a Deans' Excellence Award from the College of Communications of Penn State in 2004.
