= Germany–Luxembourg relations =

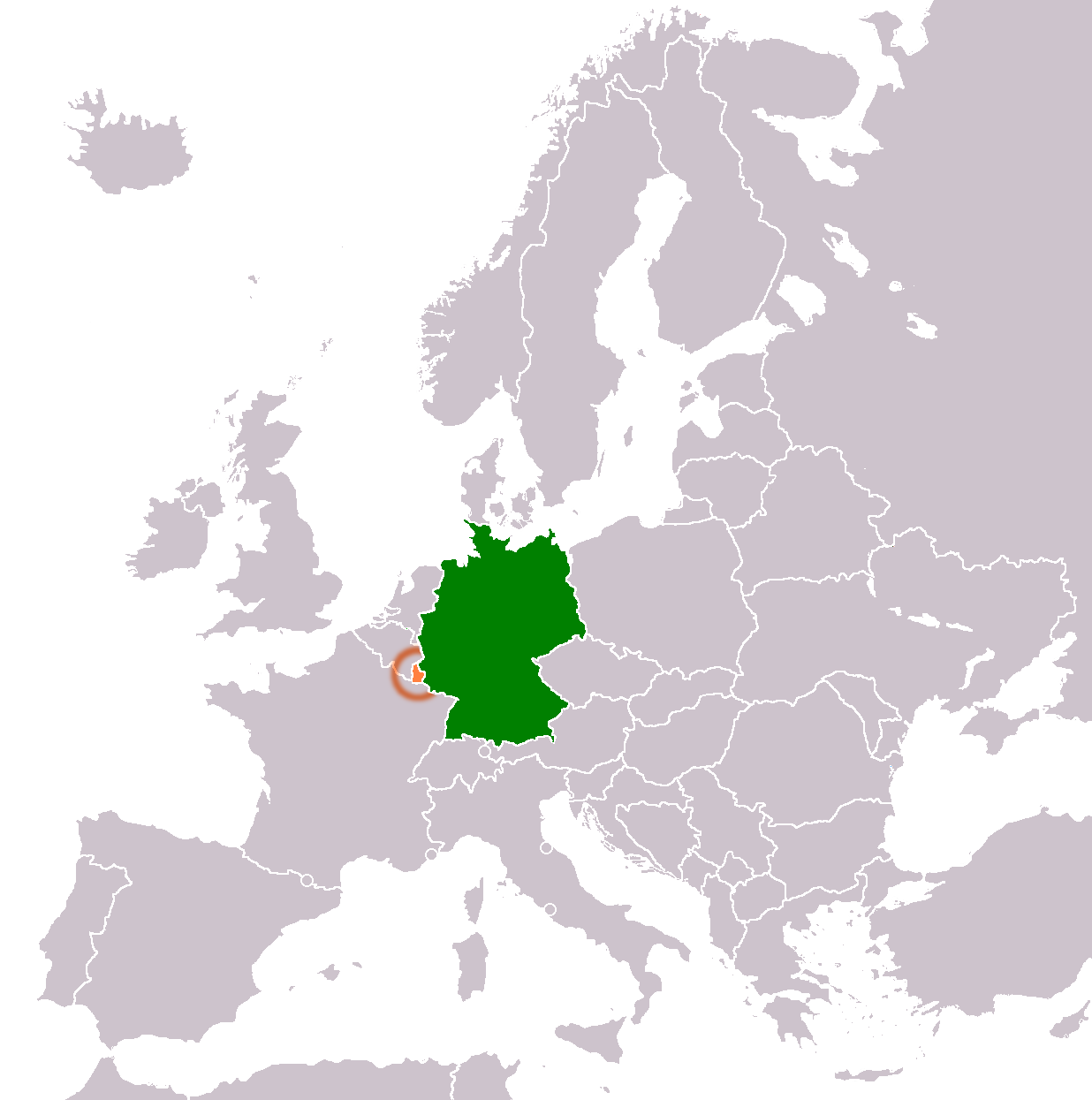

- Germany: Luxembourg

Diplomatic mission
- Embassy of Germany, Luxembourg: Embassy of Luxembourg, Germany

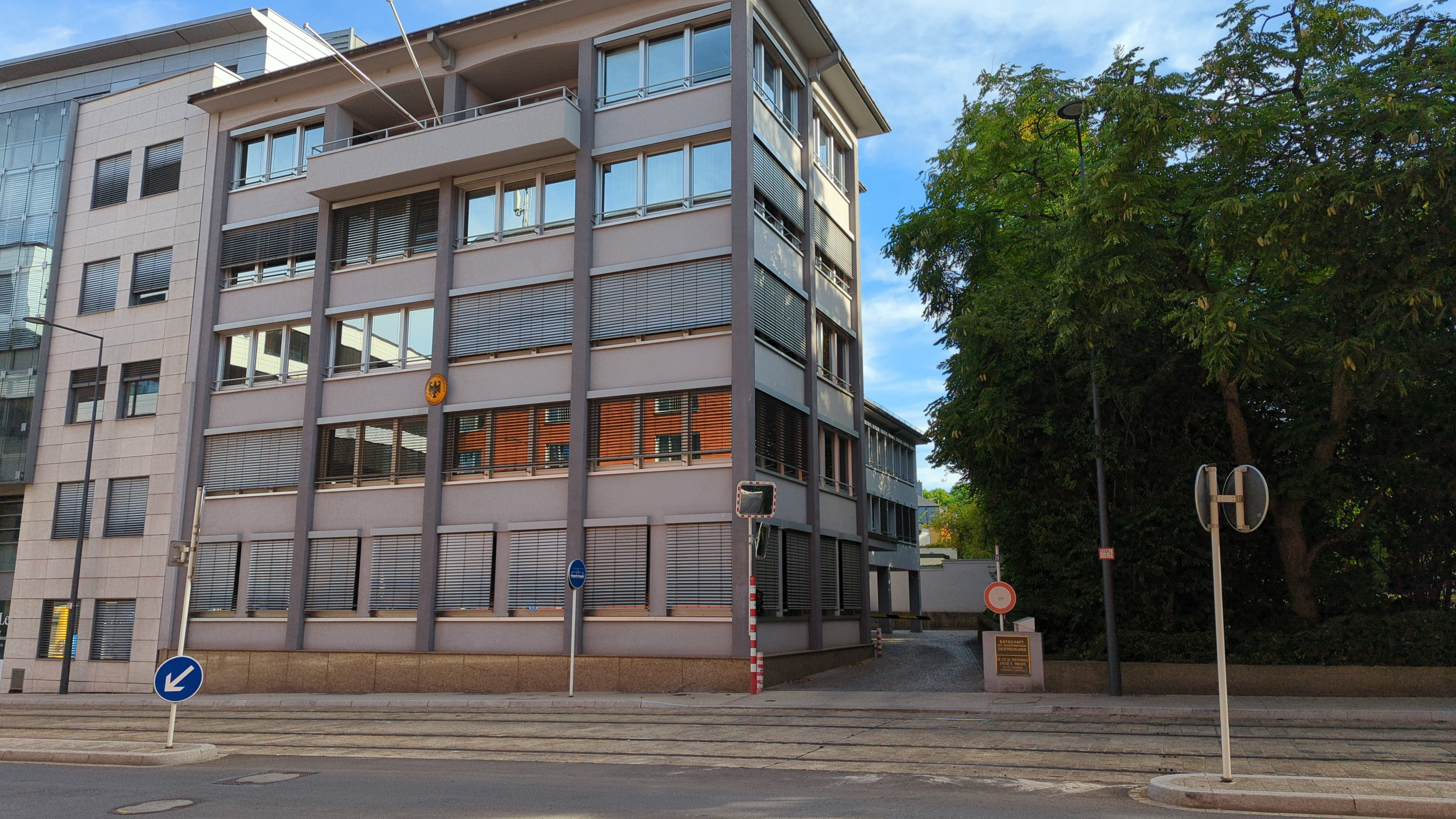
Embassy of Germany, Luxembourg

Germany and Luxembourg first established bilateral relations in April 1951. The two countries have shared a peaceful and friendly relationship over their 75 year relationship, especially through their mutual cooperation in international organisations such as the European Union, NATO, the OECD and the United Nations. The heads of state of both countries participate in the annual meeting of German-speaking countries.

Both countries have embassies to each other, with Germany's embassy in Luxembourg City, and Luxembourg's embassy in Berlin, along with ten honorary consulates.

The two countries share a 138 kilometres (86 mi) land border, with Luxembourg mostly bordering the German state of Rhineland-Palatinate, as well as a small 8 kilometres (5.0 mi) border with the state of Saarland.

== History ==
Luxembourg was a member of the Holy Roman Empire, the German Confederation and German Customs Union. In 1815, Luxembourg lost a portion of its territory to the Kingdom of Prussia (predecessor of modern Germany) in the Second Partition of Luxembourg. From 1914 to 1918, German troops occupied Luxembourg during the First World War. During this time, the First German Embassy in Luxembourg was used as the Grand Headquarters, which led to disgruntlement. The 1914 Septemberprogramm authorized by German Chancellor Theobald von Bethmann Hollweg planned an annexation of Luxembourg into Germany as one of its federal states.

During World War II, the Wehrmacht invaded Luxembourg on the night of May 9–10, 1940, to attack France, and held the country until 1944. The Grand Duchess Charlotte fled with her family and government into exile. From May 1940, the Volksdeutsche movement in Luxembourg was convinced that Luxembourgers belonged to the "Germanic race" (Volksdeutsche) and, during the occupation of Luxembourg in World War II, tried to achieve annexation to the National Socialist German Reich. In August 1942, Germany annexed the occupied country until the Liberation of Luxembourg in 1944.

After the war, diplomatic relation were re-established in 1951. Both countries became trusted neighbors and became founding members of the European Coal and Steel Community and advocates of European Integration. The French Lorraine, the German Saarland and the Grand Duchy of Luxembourg today cooperate closely across borders in various areas within the framework of the Saar-Lor-Lux European Region.

== Economic relations ==
Germany is Luxembourg's most important economic partner, accounting for 27% of its foreign trade volume. Around 50,000 Germans work in Luxembourg.

== Diaspora ==
There were around 23,000 Luxembourgers living in Germany in 2020, and around 17,000 Germans living in Luxembourg in 2020.

== Resident diplomatic missions ==
- Germany has an embassy in Luxembourg City.
- Luxembourg has an embassy in Berlin.

== See also ==
- Foreign relations of Germany
- Foreign relations of Luxembourg
