= List of ambassadors of Luxembourg to the Czech Republic =

The Ambassador from Luxembourg to the Czech Republic is the Grand Duchy of Luxembourg's foremost diplomatic representative in the Czech Republic, and in charge of Luxembourg's diplomatic relations with Estonia and Ukraine.

The embassy is in Prague, and was opened in 2002.

== List of heads of mission ==
=== Ambassador to the Czech Republic ===
- Pierre-Louis Lorenz (2002–2005)
- Mark Kurt (2005–2008)
- Jean Faltz (2008–2012)
- Michèle Pranchère-Tomassini (2012–2017)
- Gerard Phillips (September 2017 – present)
