= PTAT Systems =

Private Trans-Atlantic Telecommunication Systems, (PTAT Systems) was an American telecommunications company.

The company was created in March 1984 as Tel-Optik, and filed a Cable Landing License application in September 1984 and together with Cable and Wireless of the United Kingdom, built the first privately financed transatlantic fiber-optic cable, PTAT-1. It was turned on in May 1989 and was sold to Sprint Corporation in August 1989.

PTAT-1 consisted of 3 operational fiber pairs and one spare fibre pair. The total bandwidth was 27 DS-3 channels of 45 Mbit/s each - a total of roughly 1.2 Gbit/s. When PTAT-1 was turned on it was 2/3s of the total bandwidth available across the Atlantic at the time. PTAT-1 was turned off when much larger systems made PTAT-1 no longer worth operating.

The main spur of PTAT-1 linked New York and London via Manasquan NJ in the US, and Brean in the UK. A single fiber pair was looped down to Bermuda and up to Ireland providing 4 way connectivity.

When planning started in the summer of 1983, the longest fiber system in the US was less than a mile long and ran at 1.5 Mbit/s, a T-1.

The company was founded on premise that introducing international telecommunication competition would be easier via cable than via satellite, due to the regulatory environment that protected the International Telecommunications Satellite Organization. The relevant regulation for a cable system was the Cable Landing License Act of 1921, which stipulated that the party at the other end of the cable be acceptable to the US.

As a result of the competitive pressure that PTAT-1 introduced to the international telecommunications market, by the time the system was turned on, the international telecom monopoly between AT&T and British Telecom was broken, and the cost of international telecommunications plummeted.

PTAT-1 set the stage for the explosion of fiber optic systems which now circle the world.

The founders of PTAT System, Inc. were Ron Coleman, Brian Hughes, Jim McGillan, and Konnie Schaefer. E. F. Hutton & Co. was the major financial partner in PTAT Systems.

Ron Coleman was chairman and Konnie Schaefer was the president when the Cable Landing License was filed. Ron Coleman was CEO and chairman when the company was acquired by Sprint in 1989.
