= B. Roy Frieden =

American mathematician

Bernard Roy Frieden (born September 10, 1936) is an American mathematical physicist. He is an emeritus professor of optical sciences at the University of Arizona.

== Education and career ==
Frieden grew up in Brooklyn, New York, where his father was part-owner of the Empire Mirror Works until the collapse of the business in 1948. After a bachelor's degree in physics from Brooklyn College, he received a master's degree at the University of Pennsylvania in 1959.

He worked for General Electric and then in Rochester, New York for Bausch & Lomb, but found himself jobless in 1962, when the project he worked for was disbanded. He returned to graduate study in The Institute of Optics at the University of Rochester, and completed his Ph.D. in 1966. His doctoral thesis advisor was Robert E. Hopkins.

He joined the University of Arizona faculty as an assistant professor in 1966, and remained there for the rest of his career, retiring as a professor emeritus in 2002.

== Research and recognition ==
Frieden is known for his pioneering work on laser beam shaping and was among the first to investigate the optical transfer function of a three-dimensional object. He was the first to apply Jaynes' maximum entropy principle to image restoration.

He was elected a Fellow of the Optical Society of America, now known as Optica, in 1975; in 1988, he was elected a Fellow of SPIE.

Frieden originated Extreme Physical Information (EPI), an information-theoretic framework deriving physical laws from Fisher information. His foundational work is detailed in the books Physics from Fisher Information (1998) and Science from Fisher Information (2004). EPI has been independently applied and extended in peer-reviewed research across multiple disciplines, including thermodynamics (Plastino), evolutionary biology (Gatenby), systems science (Yolles), and quantum foundations (Regoli).

== Selected publications ==
- Frieden, B. Roy (1965). "Lossless conversion of a plane laser wave to a plane wave of uniform irradiance". Applied Optics. 4 (11): 1400–1403. Bibcode:1965ApOpt...4.1400F. doi:10.1364/AO.4.001400.
- Frieden, B. Roy (1967). "Optical transfer of the three-dimensional object". Journal of the Optical Society of America. 57 (1): 56–66. doi:10.1364/JOSA.57.000056. hdl:10150/621607.
- Frieden, B. Roy (1972). "Restoring with maximum likelihood and maximum entropy". Journal of the Optical Society of America. 62 (4): 511–518. doi:10.1364/JOSA.62.000511. PMID 5019595.
- Frieden, B. Roy (1983). Probability, Statistical Optics, and Data Testing. Springer-Verlag. 2nd ed., 1991. 3rd ed., 2001.
- Frieden, B. Roy (1998). Physics from Fisher Information: A Unification. Cambridge: Cambridge University Press. ISBN 978-0521599181.
- Frieden, B. Roy (2004). Science from Fisher Information: A Unification. Cambridge: Cambridge University Press. ISBN 978-0521832563.
