= List of diplomatic missions in London =

This is a list of the 165 resident embassies in London. For other diplomatic missions in the United Kingdom, see List of diplomatic missions in the United Kingdom.

== Embassies and High Commissions ==
Embassy/High Commission	Location	Neighbourhood	Image	Notes
Albania	33 St George’s Drive 51.490667°N 0.144028°W	Pimlico		
Algeria	1–3 Riding House Street 51.518222°N 0.142722°W	Westminster		
Angola	22 Dorset Street 51.51925°N 0.158028°W	Marylebone		
Antigua and Barbuda	45 Crawford Place 51.518917°N 0.165194°W	Marylebone		
Argentina	65 Brook Street 51.512472°N 0.14875°W	Mayfair		
Armenia	25A Cheniston Gardens 51.499°N 0.193°W	South Kensington		
Australia	Australia House, Strand 51.512889°N 0.115722°W	Aldwych		
Austria	18 Belgrave Square 51.4985°N 0.154694°W	Belgravia		
Azerbaijan	66 Holland Park 51.5064077°N 0.2068935°W	Holland Park		
Bahamas	10 Chesterfield Street 51.507167°N 0.148611°W	Mayfair		
Bahrain	30 Belgrave Square	Belgravia		
Bangladesh	28 Queen's Gate	Kensington		
Barbados	1 Great Russell Street 51.5171°N 0.1308°W	Bloomsbury		
Belarus	6 Kensington Court	South Kensington		
Belize	45 Crawford Place	Marylebone		
Belgium	17 Grosvenor Crescent	Belgravia		
Bolivia	106 Eaton Square	Belgravia		
Bosnia and Herzegovina	5-7 Lexham Gardens	South Kensington		
Botswana	6 Stratford Pl	Marylebone		
Brazil	14/16 Cockspur Street	Westminster		
Brunei	19-20 Belgrave Square	Belgravia		
Bulgaria	186–188 Queen's Gate	South Kensington		
Burundi	58–59 Trafalgar Square 51.5072°N 0.1283°W	Trafalgar Square		
Cambodia	64 Brondesbury Park	Willesden		
Cameroon	84 Holland Park	Holland Park		
Canada	Trafalgar Square (Canada House) 51.5079°N 0.1295°W	Trafalgar Square		
Chile	37-41 Old Queen Street	Westminster		
China	49–51 Portland Place 51.52102°N 0.14548°W	Marylebone		
Colombia	3 Hans Crescent	Knightsbridge		
Democratic Republic of the Congo	281 Gray's Inn Road 51°31′2.4″N 0°8′30.2″W	Fitzrovia		
Republic of the Congo	101 New Street Hill 51°25′21.3″N 0°1′56.5″E	Bromley		
Costa Rica	23 Woodstock St	Mayfair		
Croatia	21 Conway Street 51°31′24″N 0°8′28.5″W	Fitzrovia		
Cuba	167 High Holborn 51°30′58.1″N 0°7′31.4″W	St Giles		
Cyprus	13 St James's Square 51°30′26.8″N 0°8′11.2″W	St James's		
Czech Republic	26-30 Kensington Palace Gardens	Notting Hill Gate		
Denmark	55 Sloane Street	Knightsbridge		
Dominica	1 Collingham Gardens	South Kensington		
Dominican Republic	81 Cromwell Road	South Kensington		
Ecuador	3 Hans Crescent	Knightsbridge		
Egypt	26 South Street	Mayfair		
El Salvador	8 Dorset Square	Marylebone		
Equatorial Guinea	13 Park Place	St James's		
Eritrea	96 White Lion Street	Islington		
Estonia	44 Queen's Gate Terrace	South Kensington		
Eswatini	20 Buckingham Gate	Westminster		
Ethiopia	17 Princes Gate	South Kensington		
Fiji	34 Hyde Park Gate	South Kensington		?
Finland	38 Chesham Place	Belgravia		
France	58 Knightsbridge	Knightsbridge		
Gabon	27 Elvaston Place	South Kensington		
Gambia	92 Ledbury Road	Bayswater		
Georgia	20 St. George's Square	Pimlico		
Germany	23 Belgrave Square	Belgravia		
Ghana	13 Belgrave Square	Belgravia		
Greece	1A Holland Park	Holland Park		
Grenada	45 Bedford Row	Holborn		
Guatemala	105A Westbourne Grove	Notting Hill		
Guinea	239 Old Marylebone Road	Marylebone		
Guyana	3 Palace Court 51°30′36.2″N 0°11′30.8″W	Bayswater		
Haiti	21 Bloomsbury Way	Holborn		
Holy See	54 Parkside	Wimbledon		
Honduras	4th Floor 136, Baker Street	Marylebone		
Hungary	35 Eaton Place	Belgravia		
Iceland	2A Hans Street 51.4978°N 0.1594°W	Knightsbridge		
India	India House 51.5125°N 0.1183°W	Aldwych		
Indonesia	30 Great Peter Street	Westminster		
Iran	16 Prince's Gate 51.50153°N 0.17231°W	South Kensington		
Iraq	21 Queen's Gate	South Kensington		
Ireland	17 Grosvenor Place	Belgravia		
Israel	2 Palace Green 51.503056°N 0.189444°W	South Kensington		
Italy	4-5 Buckingham Gate	Westminster		
Ivory Coast	2 Upper Belgrave Street	Belgravia		
Jamaica	1-2 Prince Consort Road	South Kensington		
Japan	101–104 Piccadilly	Mayfair		
Jordan	6 Upper Phillimore Gardens	Holland Park		
Kazakhstan	125 Pall Mall 51.507528°N 0.130972°W	St James's		
Kenya	45 Portland Place	Marylebone		
Kosovo	8 John Street 51°31′19.06″N 0°6′53.89″W	Holborn		
Kuwait	2 Albert Gate	Knightsbridge		
Kyrgyzstan	Ascot House, 119 Crawford Street	Marylebone		
Laos	49 Porchester Terrace	Bayswater		
Latvia	45 Nottingham Place	Marylebone		
Lebanon	21 Kensington Palace Gardens	Holland Park		
Lesotho	7 Chesham Place	Belgravia		
Liberia	23 Fitzroy Square 51°31′22.4″N 0°8′26.8″W	Fitzrovia		
Libya	15 Knightsbridge	Knightsbridge		
Lithuania	2 Bessborough Gardens	Pimlico		
Luxembourg	27 Wilton Crescent	Belgravia		
Madagascar	One Knightsbridge Green, 5th Floor	Knightsbridge		
Malawi	36 John Street 51°31′17.3″N 0°6′54.4″W	Holborn		
Malaysia	45 Belgrave Square	Belgravia		
Maldives	22 Nottingham Place	Marylebone		
Malta	36-38 Piccadilly	Mayfair		
Mauritania	Carlyle House, 235–237 Vauxhall Bridge Road	Victoria		
Mauritius	32/33 Elvaston Place	South Kensington		
Mexico	16 St. George Street	Mayfair		
Moldova	55 Catherine Place	Westminster		
Monaco	7 Upper Grosvenor Street	Mayfair		
Mongolia	7-8 Kensington Court	South Kensington		
Montenegro	47 De Vere Gardens	Kensington		
Morocco	6 Grosvenor Gardens	Belgravia		
Mozambique	21 Fitzroy Square 51°31′22.6″N 0°8′27.45″W	Fitzrovia		
Myanmar	19A Charles Street	Mayfair		
Namibia	6 Chandos Street	Marylebone		
Nepal	12a Kensington Palace Gardens	Holland Park		
Netherlands	38 Hyde Park Gate	South Kensington		
New Zealand	80 Haymarket 51.5077°N 0.1318°W	St James's		
Nigeria	9 Northumberland Avenue	Westminster		
North Korea	73 Gunnersbury Avenue 51.5031°N 0.28915°W	Ealing		
North Macedonia	64-65 Vincent Square	Westminster		
Norway	25 Belgrave Square	Belgravia		
Oman	167 Queen's Gate	South Kensington		
Pakistan	35–36 Lowndes Square	Belgravia		
Palestine	5 Galena Road	Hammersmith		
Panama	40 Hertford Street	Mayfair		
Papua New Guinea	14 Waterloo Place 51°30′26.8″N 0°7′59.7″W	St James's		
Paraguay	81 Cromwell Road	South Kensington		
Peru	15 Buckingham Gate London	Westminster		
Philippines	6-11 Suffolk Street	Westminster		
Poland	47 Portland Place	Marylebone		
Portugal	11 Belgrave Square	Belgravia		
Qatar	1 South Audley Street	Mayfair		
Romania	4 Palace Green	South Kensington		
Russia	6/7 Kensington Palace Gardens 51.507806°N 0.190944°W	Kensington		
Rwanda	120-122 Seymour Place	Marylebone		
Saint Kitts and Nevis	10 Kensington Ct.	Kensington		
Saint Lucia	1 Collingham Gardens	South Kensington		
Saint Vincent and the Grenadines	10 Kensington Ct.	Kensington		
Saudi Arabia	30 Charles Street	Mayfair		
Senegal	47 Bedford Row	Holborn		
Serbia	28 Belgrave Square	Belgravia		
Seychelles	130-132 Buckingham Palace Road	Victoria		
Sierra Leone	41 Eagle Street 51°31′7.7″N 0°7′2.7″W	Holborn		
Singapore	9 Wilton Crescent	Belgravia		
Slovakia	25 Kensington Palace Gardens	Notting Hill Gate		
Slovenia	17 Dartmouth Street	Westminster		
Somalia	259-269 Old Marylebone Road	Marylebone		
South Africa	South Africa House 51.5082°N 0.1269°W	Trafalgar Square		
South Korea	60 Buckingham Gate 51.498028°N 0.136583°W	Westminster		
South Sudan	22-25 Portman Close	Marylebone		
Spain	24 Belgrave Square	Belgravia		
Sri Lanka	13 Hyde Park Gardens	Bayswater		
Sudan	3 Cleveland RowHigh Commission of Papua New Guinea, London 51°30′17.38″N 0°8′18.6″W	St James's		
Sweden	11 Montagu Place	Marylebone		
Switzerland	16/18 Montagu Place	Marylebone		
Syria	8 Belgrave Square	Belgravia		
Tajikistan	110 Clarendon Road	Notting Hill		
Tanzania	3 Stratford Place	Marylebone		
Thailand	29–30 Queen's Gate	South Kensington		
Timor-Leste	83 Victoria Street	Westminster		
Togo	Units 3, 7 & 8 Lysander Mews	Archway		
Tonga	36 Molyneux Street	Marylebone		
Trinidad and Tobago	42 Belgrave Square	Belgravia		
Tunisia	29 Prince’s Gate	South Kensington		
Turkey	43 Belgrave Square	Belgravia		
Turkmenistan	131 Holland Park Avenue	Holland Park		-
Uganda	58–59 Trafalgar Square	Westminster		
Ukraine	60 Holland Park 51.5061°N 0.2082°W	Holland Park		
United Arab Emirates	1-2 Grosvenor Cres	Belgravia		
United States	33 Nine Elms Lane 51.4826°N 0.1317°W	Nine Elms		
Uruguay	150 Brompton Road	South Kensington		
Uzbekistan	41 Holland Park	Holland Park		
Venezuela	1 Cromwell Road	South Kensington		
Vietnam	12-14 Victoria Road	South Kensington		
Yemen	57 Cromwell Road	South Kensington		
Zambia	2 Palace Gate	South Kensington		
Zimbabwe	429 Strand 51.5096°N 0.124°W	Covent Garden		

== British Overseas Territories ==
Territory	Mission type	Address	Area	Photo	Website
Bermuda	Representative Office	6 Arlington Street	St James's		
British Virgin Islands	Representative Office	15 Upper Grosvenor Street	Mayfair		
Cayman Islands	Representative Office	34 Dover Street	Mayfair		
Falkland Islands	Representative Office	14 Broadway	Westminster		
Gibraltar	Representative Office	150 Strand	Aldwych		
Montserrat	Representative Office	52 Grosvenor Gardens	Victoria		
Saint Helena, Ascension and Tristan da Cunha	Representative Office	12 Caxton Street	Westminster		
Turks and Caicos Islands	Representative Office	83 Baker St	Marylebone		

== Consulates-General ==
Country	Address	Area	Image	Website
Algeria	5 Portal Way	North Acton		
Angola	46 Bedford Square	Fitzrovia		
Argentina	27 Three Kings Yard	Mayfair		
Austria	18 Belgrave Mews West	Belgravia		
Brazil	3 Vere Street	Marylebone		
Colombia	35 Portland Place	Marylebone		
Egypt	2 Lowndes Street	Belgravia		
Lebanon	38 Palace Garden Mews	Holland Park		
Poland	73 New Cavendish Street	Holborn		
Portugal	3 Portland Place	Fitzrovia		
Turkey	Rutland Lodge Rutland Gardens	Knightsbridge		
Ukraine	78 Kensington Park Rd	Notting Hill		
Venezuela	56 Grafton Way	Fitzrovia		

== Other missions or delegations ==
Country	Mission	Address	Area	Image
Arab League	Representative Office of the Arab League	106 Gloucester Place	Marylebone	
Catalonia	Delegation of Catalonia	17 Fleet Street	Aldwych	
European Union	Delegation of the European Union to the United Kingdom	32 Smith Square	Westminster	
Flanders	Delegation of Flanders	1A Cavendish Square	Marylebone	
French Community of Belgium	General Delegation of Wallonia-Brussels	17 Grosvenor Crescent	Belgravia	
Hong Kong	Hong Kong Economic and Trade Office	18 Bedford Square, London	Mayfair	
Northern Cyprus	Representative Office of the Turkish Republic of Northern Cyprus	29 Bedford Square	Bedford Square	
Quebec	General Delegation of Québec	59 Pall Mall	St James's	
Somaliland	Mission of Somaliland	43-45 East Smithfield	Whitechapel	
Republic of China (Taiwan)	Taipei Representative Office	50 Grosvenor Gardens	Belgravia	

== Official Residences ==
Country	Address	Area	Image
Argentina	49 Belgrave Square	Belgravia	
Belgium	36 Upper Belgrave Street	Belgravia	
Brazil	54 Mount Street	Mayfair	
France	11 Kensington Palace Gardens	Kensington	
Japan	23 Kensington Palace Gardens	Kensington	
Mexico	48 Belgrave Square	Belgravia	
Russia	13 Kensington Palace Gardens	Kensington	
Sweden	27 Portland Place	Marylebone	
Switzerland	21 Bryanston Square	Marylebone	
Thailand	9 Tregunter Road	Brompton	
Turkey	69 Devonshire Street	Marylebone	
United States	Winfield House	Regent's Park	

== Closed missions ==
Country	Mission	Address	Area	Image
Sweden	Consulate General	63 Finsbury Pavement (1910–1919); 329 High Holborn (1919–1947); 14 Trinity Square (1948–1969); 23 North Row (1970–1973)	London Borough of Islington (1910–1919); Holborn (1919–1947); City of London (1948–1969); Mayfair (1970–1973)	14 Trinity Square (1948–1969)

== See also ==
- Ambassadors of the United Kingdom
- Diplomatic missions of the United Kingdom
- Foreign policy of the United Kingdom
- List of diplomatic missions in the United Kingdom
- Taipei Representative Office in the United Kingdom
- Hong Kong Economic and Trade Office
