= Margaret Warrender =

Scottish historian and author (1855–1950)

Margaret Warrender (1855–1950) was a Scottish historian and author.

Her full name was Julian Margaret Maitland Warrender. She was a daughter of Sir George Warrender of Lochend (near Dunbar) and Helen Purves-Hume-Campbell (died 1875). Her sister Alice founded the Hawthornden Prize and her brother George was an admiral. She lived at Bruntsfield House in Edinburgh and in London at Wilton Crescent.

In 1889 she edited and published a group of 18 historical documents and letters owned by her father. It was then thought that the rest of the collection had been lost in the fire at Lochend House in 1859. The other papers were rediscovered at Bruntsfield House and published by Annie Cameron and Robert S. Rait for the Scottish History Society.

Her portrait was painted by her friend Philip de László in 1912.

== Works ==
- Marchmont and the Humes of Polwarth (Edinburgh: Blackwood, 1894).
- Walks near Edinburgh (Edinburgh, 1890).
- Illustrations of Sixteenth Century Scottish History (Edinburgh: James Stillie, 1889).
