= 1942 Grantham by-election =

UK parliamentary by-election

- 25 March 1942

Constituency of Grantham
- Turnout: 42.6% (▼31.6%)
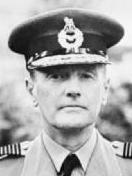
	First party	Second party
	Ind.
Candidate	Denis Kendall	Arthur Longmore
Party	Independent	Conservative
Popular vote	11,758	11,391
Percentage	50.8%	49.2%
Swing	New	▼8.9%
MP before election
Victor Warrender
Conservative
Elected MP
Denis Kendall
Independent

The 1942 Grantham by-election was a parliamentary by-election for the British House of Commons constituency of Grantham on 25 March 1942.

== Vacancy ==
The by-election was caused by the ennoblement of the sitting Conservative MP, Rt Hon. Sir Victor Warrender as Baron Bruntisfield. He had been MP here since gaining the seat from the Liberal party in 1923.

== Election history ==
Grantham had been won by the Conservative Party at every election since 1923. The result at the last General election was as follows;

1935 general election : Grantham Electorate 51,494
Party	Candidate	Votes	%	±%
Conservative	Victor Warrender	22,194	58.1	−11.1
Labour	Montague William Moore	16,009	41.9	+11.1
Majority		6,185	16.2	−22.2
Turnout		38,203	74.2	−5.3
Conservative hold		Swing		

== Candidates ==
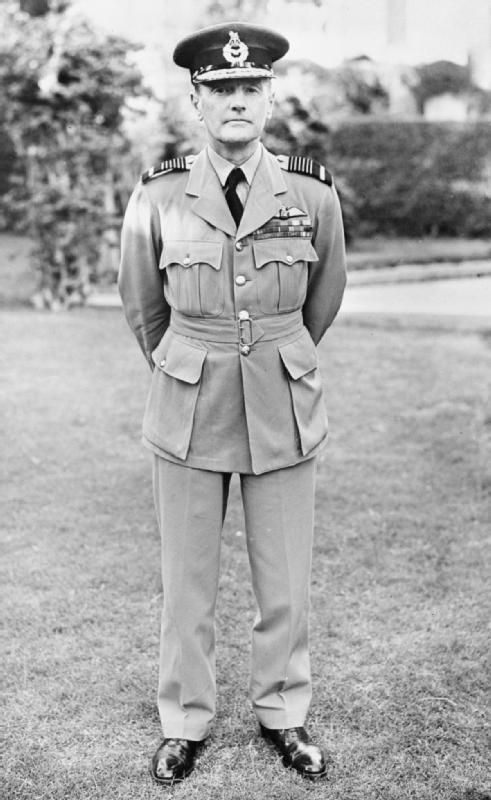
Sir Arthur Longmore

The local Conservatives selected 57-year-old Air Chief Marshal Sir Arthur Longmore. The outbreak of the Second World War found Longmore an Air Chief Marshal and in charge of RAF Training Command. On 2 April 1940, he was appointed Air Officer Commanding in the Middle East. He did not long enjoy the full confidence of Winston Churchill in that position and was relieved of his command in May 1941. His last role before his formal retirement in 1942 was as Inspector-General of the RAF. Longmore's constant demands for reinforcements resulted in some unwelcome attention from Churchill, who hated pessimists and senior commanders who complained about their lack of resources. After some acerbic correspondence, in which Churchill accused Longmore of failing to make proper use of the manpower and aircraft he had, Longmore was recalled to London in May 1941. However, given the prominence of RAF Cranwell in the constituency, Longmore looked a suitable candidate, even if he was an outsider.

The Labour party had re-selected Montague Moore to be their candidate at the General Election expected to take place in 1939-40. He was a local schoolmaster at Claypole. He had fought the seat on four previous occasions for Labour having started his political career as a Conservative. At the time of the by-election, he was still theoretically their candidate. The Liberals had not run a candidate here since they nearly re-gained the seat in 1929 and had no candidate in place at the outbreak of war. In accordance with the terms of the wartime electoral truce, no official Labour or Liberal candidate was put forward.

However, an Independent candidate emerged in the person of 39-year-old Denis Kendall. In 1938, Kendall moved to Grantham and became Managing Director of an arms production company, the British Manufacture and Research Company (BMARC). His factory was highly productive, where workers were well-paid and provided with endless music and dance parties. He was a member of Grantham Labour party but when the news first broke of a by-election, he had approached the local Conservatives offering to be their candidate, but was turned down.

== Campaign ==
Polling day was set for 25 March 1942. When nominations closed, it was to reveal a two horse race, between the Conservative Longmore and the Independent Kendall.

Longmore received a joint letter of endorsement from all the leaders of the parties in the coalition.

Kendall had initially been supported by the Grantham Labour Party, which then withdrew support on orders from Labour Party Headquarters. The party kept its collective head down during the campaign, though they did have to restrain Montague Moore, the previous Labour candidate and a few other local Labour members from actively supporting Kendall.

The war was not going well for the Allies; the Soviets had been driven back, the Japanese had taken Singapore and many were calling for Britain to create a 'Second Front' in Europe. The popular Labour politician Sir Stafford Cripps, who had returned to Britain following a spell as Ambassador to the Soviet Union, was brought into Churchill's War Cabinet.

One of Kendall's campaign leaflets proclaimed that "Denis Kendall is another Stafford Cripps. Independent yet Churchillian." Kendall campaigned against the "gang" around Churchill without being critical of Churchill himself.

Kendall revealed wartime production figures in his election hustings speeches to criticise the government, but in a way that breached the Official Secrets and the Defence of the Realm Acts.

The Grantham Communist party in line with the position taken by their national headquarters, circulated a leaflet that urged electors to vote for the Conservative Longmore, so as to show solidarity with the Red Army.

== Result ==
Kendall won and became the first Independent to defeat a government candidate since the war started;

Grantham by-election, 1942 Electorate 54,317
Party	Candidate	Votes	%	±%
Independent	Denis Kendall	11,758	50.8	New
Conservative	Arthur Longmore	11,391	49.2	−8.9
Majority		367	1.6	N/A
Turnout		23,149	42.6	−31.6
Independent gain from Conservative		Swing		

On 18 April 1942, the magazine Picture Post published a lengthy interview with Kendall with accompanying action pictures and the eye-catching quote: "I won't sit down and I won't shut up".

== Aftermath ==
In 1945, even with the intervention of a Labour candidate, Kendall still beat the Conservative into second place. The result at the following General election;

General election 1945: Grantham Electorate 62,783
Party	Candidate	Votes	%	±%
Independent	Denis Kendall	27,719	58.2	+7.4
Conservative	George Arthur Worth	12,206	25.6	−23.6
Labour	Thomas Sansby Bavin	7,728	16.2	N/A
Majority		15,513	32.6	+31.0
Turnout		47,653	75.9	+33.3
Independent hold		Swing		

== See also ==
- List of United Kingdom by-elections
- United Kingdom by-election records
