= Simon Warrender =

British navy officer and businessman

Simon Warrender DSC
- Born: 11 August 1922; Mayfair, London, England
- Died: 8 May 2011 (aged 88); Melbourne, Australia
- Spouse: Pamela Myer (m. 1950; div. 1986)
- Children: 2+
- Father: Victor Warrender
- Relatives: John Warrender (brother)
- Military career
- Service: Royal Navy
- Units: Royal Naval Volunteer Reserve; HMS Savage
- Wars: World War II

Simon George Warrender DSC (11 August 1922 – 8 May 2011) was a Royal Navy officer and businessman. He was decorated for his actions in World War II, and immigrated to Australia after the war's end, when he was involved in the aviation industry. He married into the Myer family, and he and his wife Pamela were prominent on the Melbourne social scene.

== Early life and education ==
Warrender was the second son of Victor Warrender and the former Dorothy Rawson (daughter of Richard Rawson). He was born at his parents' house in Mayfair; his father was a Conservative Party politician, and in 1942 was raised to the peerage as Baron Bruntisfield. His godfather was Harold Alexander, 1st Earl Alexander of Tunis.

Warrender grew up at Exton Hall in Rutland, and attended Ludgrove School and Eton College, where he displayed a talent for fencing.

== Naval career ==
In 1939, Warrender joined the Royal Naval Volunteer Reserve on a whim, despite his parents' objections. After training at HMS King Alfred, he was posted to the minelayer HMS Manxman. He commanded a flotilla of boats in the Battle of Madagascar, and later took part in relieving the Siege of Malta.

In 1943, Warrender transferred to the destroyer HMS Savage, which formed part of an Arctic convoy for the following two years. He was Savage's torpedo control officer during the Battle of the North Cape, and helped sink the German battleship Scharnhorst, for which he was awarded the Distinguish Service Cross (DSC). In 1944, Warrender was posted to Melbourne, Australia, as a flag lieutenant to help prepare for the arrival of the British Pacific Fleet.

Towards the end of the war he was stationed in Hong Kong, where he helped relieve the POW camp at Sham Shui Po and re-establish British administration.

== Life in Australia ==
Warrender took to flying after returning to civilian life, and in 1949 resolved to fly to Australia. His flight, in a single-engine Percival Proctor, took 34 days and was widely reported upon by Australian newspapers. It was a marketing stunt for his aircraft company, Sponson Developments.

In June 1950, Warrender married Pamela Myer, the daughter of Australian businessman Sir Norman Myer, in London. The wedding was attended by many leading members of the aristocracy, as well as three members of the Royal Family. They decided to settle in Melbourne, where Warrender set up as an insurance broker. The couple also imported four toy poodles from London, making them among the first breeders in Australia.

Warrender and his wife became a fixture on the Melbourne social scene, and counted several other noteworthies among their friends, including future prime minister Harold Holt.

He became an Australian citizen in 1967.

He was a member of the exclusive Melbourne Club, but resigned his membership in 1971 to protest the alleged exclusion of Jewish members of his wife's family; he was the first person to resign in the club's history.

He returned to the aviation industry in later life, helping Freddie Laker in his unsuccessful attempt to break into the Australian market in the 1970s, and later chaired Australia World Airways, which purported to be a competitor for Qantas but never went into operation.

== Death and legacy ==
Warrender died on 8 May 2011. He and his wife had divorced in 1986, but remained close and were lifelong partners.

Pamela M. Warrender, who was the daughter of Sir Norman Myer, founded the Committee for Melbourne, an apolitical member-based organisation that seeks to have a positive impact on the long-term development of Greater Melbourne.

One son, Alexander, predeceased his father. Another son, Simon H. Warrender, founded the Melbourne Prize Trust in 2004, dedicated to awarding arts prizes for urban sculpture, literature, and music created by Melbourne creatives.

== Publications ==
In 1973, Warrender published an autobiography, Scores of Years with a foreword written by politician Jim Cairns.
