= Luxembourg–United Kingdom relations =

- Luxembourg: United Kingdom

Diplomatic mission
- Embassy of Luxembourg, London: Embassy of the United Kingdom, Luxembourg City

Luxembourg–United Kingdom relations are the bilateral relations between the Grand Duchy of Luxembourg and the United Kingdom of Great Britain and Northern Ireland.

Both countries share common membership of the Council of Europe, European Court of Human Rights, the International Criminal Court, NATO, OECD, OSCE, and the World Trade Organization. Bilaterally the two countries have a Double Taxation Convention.

== History ==
In 1914, the Germans invaded and occupied Luxembourg, and the German General Staff was also located in Luxembourg. At the end of World War I, Allied forces liberated Luxembourg from German occupation.

In 1940, Luxembourg was reoccupied by Germany during the campaign in France and the Netherlands, and remained under German occupation until 1944. In December 1944, the Battle of the Bulge took place in Luxembourg, in which the Germans attempted to advance towards Antwerp again, but were stopped by the Allies, including forces from the British Second Army. During the war, the Luxembourg government-in-exile was based in London.

After the war, Luxembourg and Britain joined NATO, and later both were founding members of the European Union. Today, relations between the two countries are described as "excellent", and enjoy political, economic, social and cultural ties.

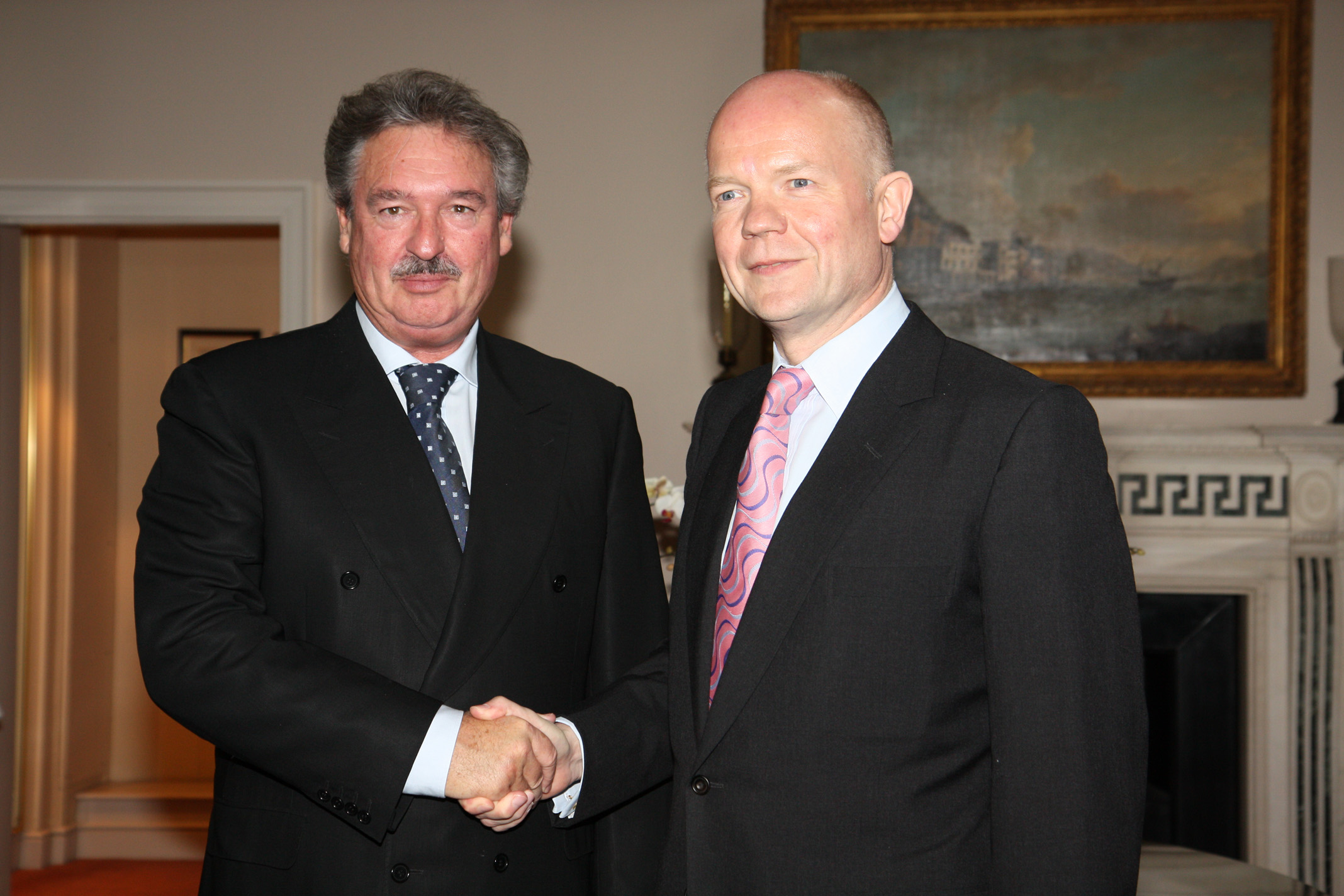
Luxembourger Foreign Minister Jean Asselborn with British Foreign Secretary William Hague in London, January 2011.

== Resident diplomatic missions ==
- Luxembourg maintains an embassy in London.
- The United Kingdom is accredited to Luxembourg through its embassy in Luxembourg City.

== See also ==
- Foreign relations of Luxembourg
- Foreign relations of the United Kingdom
