= The Queen's Award for Enterprise: International Trade (Export) (1981) =

The Queen's Award for Enterprise: International Trade (Export) (1981) was awarded on 21 April 1981, by Queen Elizabeth II.

== Recipients ==
The following organisations were awarded this year.

- ACS Engineering
- AVX
- Walter Alexander (Coachbuilders)
- Associated British Maltsters
- The Associated Octel Company
- Aviation Traders (Engineering)
- BIS Software
- Babcock Power
- Baker Perkins (Printing Machinery Division)
- Barrie Knitwear
- Berry Bros. & Rudd
- Black & Decker
- Borg Warner (Chemicals Division)
- Bradbury Wilkinson and Company
- Braithwaite and Taylor
- British Hartford-Fairmont
- British Manufacture and Research Company
- H P Bulmer (Pectin Division)
- CQC
- Cam Gears (The Resolven Factory)
- Camber International (England)
- Cementation International
- Conoco
- Crown House Engineering International
- Cummins Engine Company (Daventry Division)
- DJB Engineering
- Davy-Loewy
- Dowty Mining Equipment
- F Drake (Fibres)
- Educational Supply Association International
- Exploration and Production Services (Venuture)
- Exproduct
- Fernau Avionics
- Fitzgerald Lightring
- Fort Vale Engineering
- Foster Wheeler Power Products
- E & W C French (Taunton)
- GEC Turbine Generators
- Garrett AiResearch
- Glenlivet Whisky
- Glossop Superalloys
- Guinness Peat Group
- Haden International
- Houdret & Company
- Imperial Chemical Industries (Mond Division)
- Imperial Chemical Industries (Petrochemical Division)
- Instron
- Inter Commodities
- International Textile Company
- JCB Service
- JLG Industries (United Kingdom)
- Keystone Valve (UK)
- Staveley Machine Tools (Lapointe Broach Company Division)
- Lep Group'
- Lucas Aerospace (Actuation Division)
- Lucas CAV (CAV Fuel Injection Equipment UK Division)
- Lupofresh
- Macawber Engineering
- Kenneth Mackenzie Holdings
- Malvern Instruments
- Mars (Klix Division)
- Mayer, Newman & Company
- Merrett Syndicates
- Milton-Lloyd Associates
- Moores of Carnforth
- L G Mouchel and Partners
- Nautech
- Orme (Engineering Division)
- Polymer Engineering
- Park Air Electronics
- Perkins Engines
- Pirelli
- Plessey Semiconductors
- Preforamtions (Magnets)
- Pye T V T
- Pyrok Holdings
- RHP Bearings (Transmission Bearing Division)
- Racal Communications
- Renishaw Electrical
- Rowntree Mackintosh
- Seabourne Express
- Sericol Group
- Servicised
- Shackleton Engineering
- Shanning International
- Short Brothers
- Silberline
- Simon-Hartley
- Solid State Logic
- Steetley Minerals (Magnesia Division)
- Henry Taylor Tools
- Vesuvius Crucible
- Williams Grand Prix Engineering
