= Wilton Crescent =

Street in Belgravia, Central London

Coordinates: 51°30′02″N 0°09′20″W

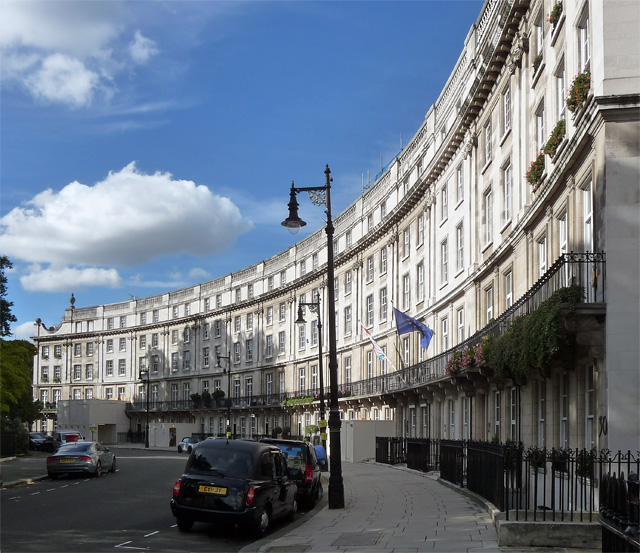
Wilton Crescent (Numbers 30-16 consecutive)

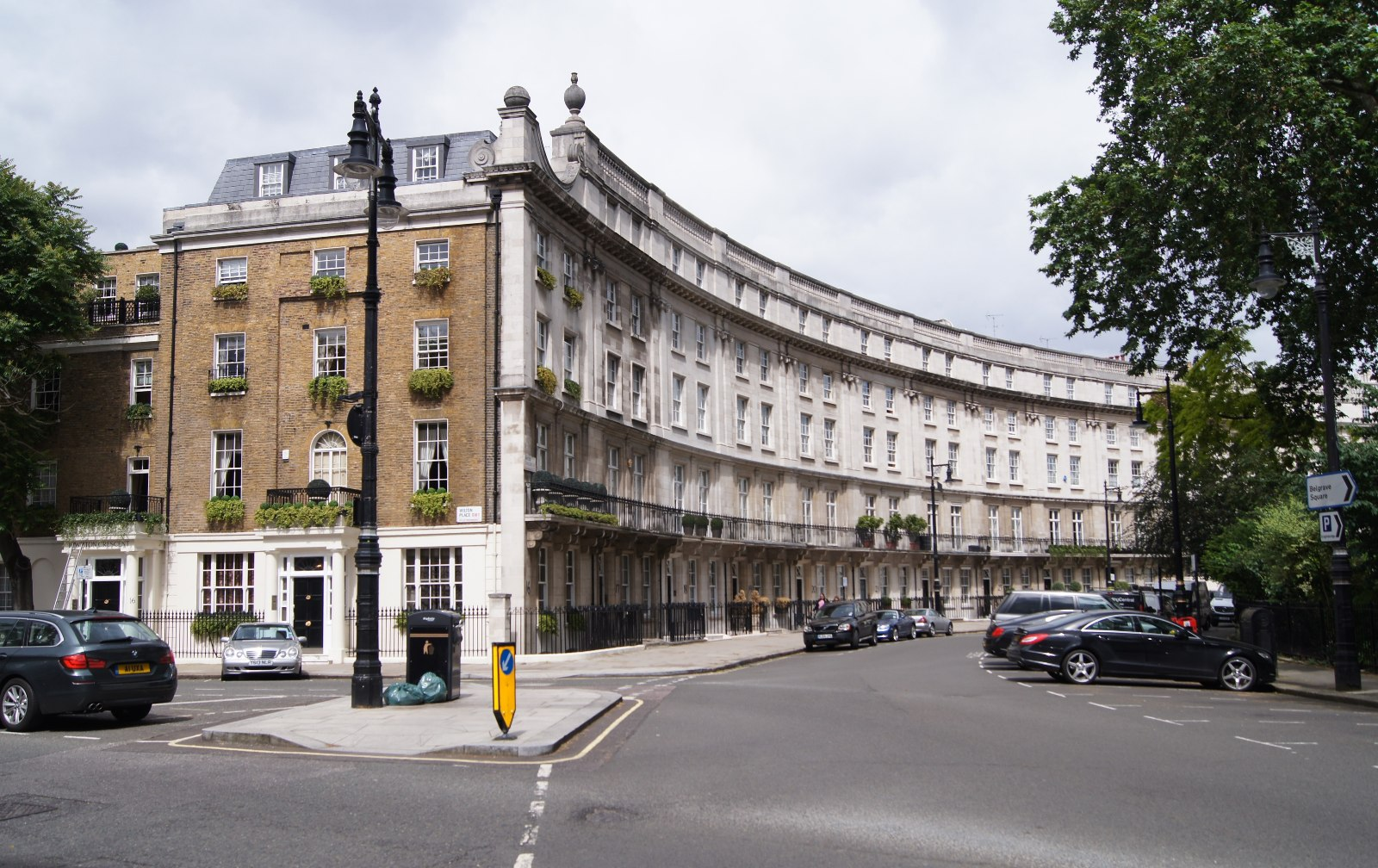
Wilton Crescent from Junction (16-30)

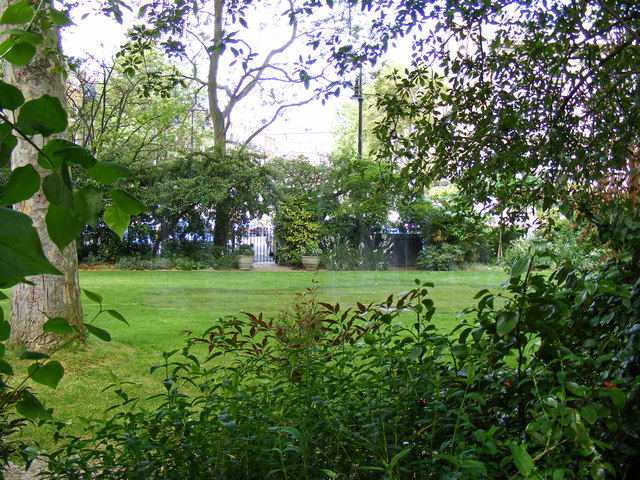
Wilton Crescent Garden

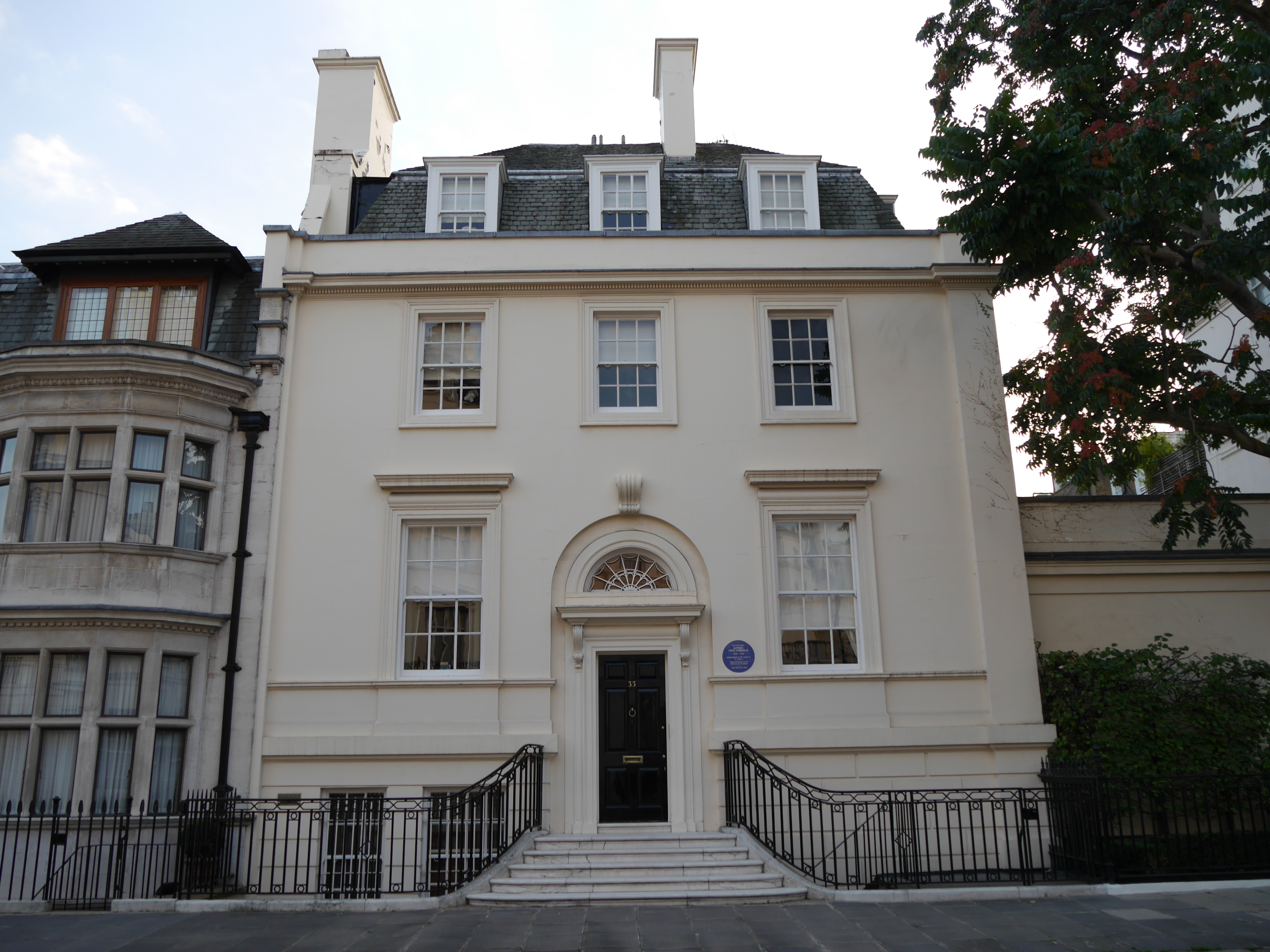
33 Wilton Crescent

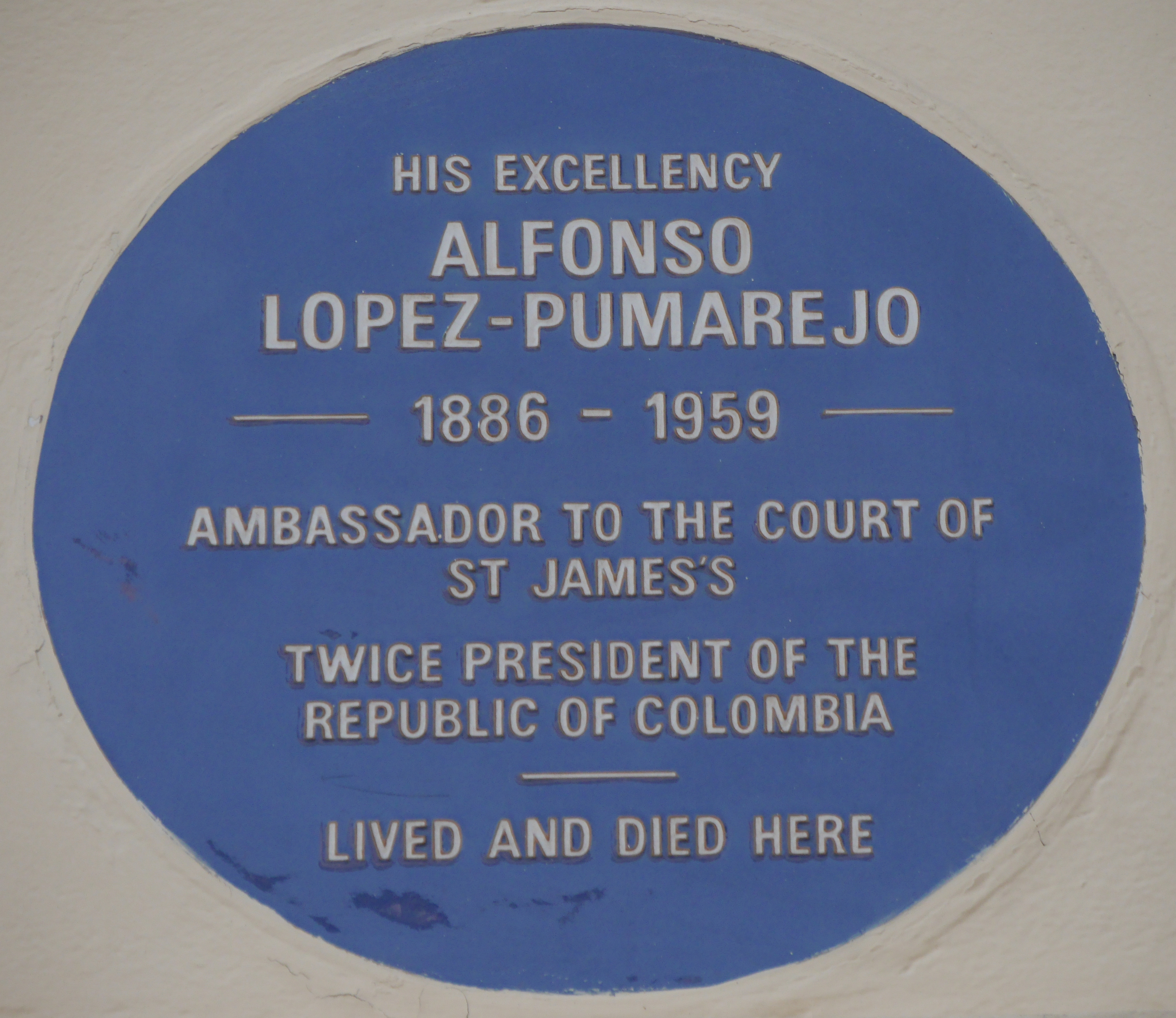
Alfonso López Pumarejo blue plaque, 33 Wilton Crescent and part of 32 to the left, which uniquely in the Crescent form part of a terrace with 1-11 Belgrave Square

Wilton Crescent is a street in Belgravia, Central London, comprising a sweeping elegant terrace of Georgian houses and the private communal gardens that the semi-circle looks out upon. The houses were built in the early 19th century and are now Grade II listed buildings. The street is the northern projection of Belgravia and is often taken to fall into the category of London's garden squares. (Note: The crescent constitutes a garden square in the same way as Walcot Square, Lambeth which is triangular; and Wilton Square, Islington centred on an irregular quadrilateral which resembles a rounded triangle.)

It is notable for its affluent and politically important list of residents, present and historic, and it today includes the High Commission of Singapore and equivalent Embassy of Luxembourg. Its closest public transit link is Hyde Park Corner tube station, beyond a cluster of affluent mews and St Paul's Knightsbridge (built in 1843).

== Overview ==
Wilton Crescent was created by Thomas Cundy II, the Grosvenor family estate surveyor, and was drawn up with the original 1821 Wyatt plan for Belgravia. It was named at the time of Thomas Egerton, 2nd Earl of Wilton, second son of Robert Grosvenor, 1st Marquess of Westminster, on whose estate the road was built in 1825 through Seth Smith (property developer)

In the 19th and 20th centuries, it was home to many prominent British politicians, ambassadors and civil servants. Louis Mountbatten, 1st Earl Mountbatten of Burma (1900–1979), lived at 2 Wilton Crescent for many years, marked today by an attributive blue plaque. Wilton Crescent is characterised by grand terrace houses, similar to other developments in the area, albeit narrower than those on nearby Belgrave Square. The crescent is laid out with Portland stone-clad, five-storey houses toward the north, and a straight row of stuccoed houses to the south. The curved terraces had originally been built in brick, but were- re-clad in stone between 1908 and 1912 under the supervision of architects Balfour and Turner.

Wilton Crescent lies east of Lowndes Square and Lowndes Street, to the northwest of Belgrave Square, and south of Wilton Place which connects it to the main road in Knightsbridge. Grosvenor Crescent is to the east, where the Indonesian Embassy is located. There is a private communal garden in the centre of the crescent, which won a bronze medal from the London Gardens Society in 2007.

There are two diplomatic buildings in Wilton Crescent: the High Commission of Singapore at No. 9, and the Embassy of Luxembourg at No. 27 (formerly home to the Luxembourgish government-in-exile).

=== Layout and numbering ===
The 50 buildings forming the Crescent are Grade II listed buildings. The crescent is split into three terraces of houses, and number 31 which forms a terrace with 1-15 Grosvenor Crescent. Numbers 32 and 33 face the opposite side of a brief continuation of the eastern arm of the crescent leading into Belgrave Square which form a terrace with 1-11 Belgrave Square. The western arm of the crescent which leads into Belgrave Square is named Wilton Terrace. It dates from the same period and is built in a similar style.

=== References in the arts ===
George Bernard Shaw's 1905 play Major Barbara is partly set at Lady Britomart's house in Wilton Crescent.

== Architectural details ==
The main two quadrants and main facing return of the crescent, forming 47 of the 50 buildings, are faced in portland stone, and are given a near-identical architectural treatment throughout. The first floor has Doric pilasters between the windows surmounted by a cornice above, which supports a giant order of paired paired ionic order pilasters which rise two floors and divide the houses, supporting a large modillion cornice. There is an attic storey which is crowned by a decorative balustrade of turned balusters, and the terminal ends of the terraces are further ornamented with ball finials.

== Notable residents ==
- Edward Pleydell-Bouverie (1818–1889); 44 Wilton Crescent
- Louis Mountbatten, 1st Earl Mountbatten of Burma (1900–1979); 2 Wilton Crescent
- Lord Randolph Churchill (1849 – 1895); 3 Wilton Crescent
- George Finch Hatton, 10th Earl of Winchilsea (1791–1858); No. 20 Wilton Crescent
- Reynold Clement (1834 - 1905), cricketer; No. 23 and No. 20 Wilton Crescent
- Richard Clement (1832 - 1873), cricketer; No. 23 and No. 20 Wilton Crescent
- Sir Percy Loraine, 12th Baronet (1880–1961); 19 Wilton Crescent
- Earls of Kinnoull, 41 Wilton Crescent
- George Rennie (engineer) (1791–1866); 39 Wilton Crescent
- Alfonso López Pumarejo (twice President of Colombia); 33 Wilton Crescent
- Sir Edmund Vivian Gabriel (1875–1950); 41 Wilton Crescent
- Quentin Crewe (1926–1998), writer
- Edmund Phipps (1808–1857), lawyer and writer
- Spencer Ponsonby-Fane (1824–1915)
- Grand Duchess Charlotte of Luxembourg (1896–1985); stayed on various occasion at 27 Wilton Crescent (now the Luxembourg Embassy) while in exile in London during World War II.
- Demetri Marchessini (1934-2016)
- Lord Dudley Stuart (1803–1854); 16 Wilton Crescent
- Hannah Courtoy (1784–1849); 14 Wilton Crescent
- John Russell, 1st Earl Russell (1792–1878); 30 Wilton Crescent
- Margaret Warrender (died 1950), author; at 50 Wilton Crescent
- Herbert Watney (1843–1932), physician; 1 Wilton Crescent

== See also ==
- List of eponymous roads in London
- List of garden squares in London
