= Victor Warrender, 1st Baron Bruntisfield =

British Conservative politician

The Right Honourable The Lord Bruntisfield MC PC

Parliamentary and Financial Secretary to the Admiralty
- In office 18 June 1935 – 28 November 1935
- Monarch: George V
- Prime Minister: Stanley Baldwin
- Preceded by: Lord Stanley
- Succeeded by: Lord Stanley
- In office 3 April 1940 – 26 July 1945
- Monarch: George VI
- Prime Minister: Neville Chamberlain; Winston Churchill
- Preceded by: Geoffrey Shakespeare
- Succeeded by: John Dugdale

Financial Secretary to the War Office
- In office 28 November 1935 – 3 April 1940
- Monarchs: George V Edward VIII; George VI
- Prime Minister: Stanley Baldwin; Neville Chamberlain
- Preceded by: Douglas Hacking
- Succeeded by: Sir Edward Grigg

Personal details
- Born: 23 June 1899
- Died: 14 January 1993 (aged 93)
- Party: Conservative
- Spouse(s): Dorothy Rawson (m. 1920; div. 1945) Tania Kolin (m. 1948)
- Children: 5, including John and Simon
- Parent: Sir George Warrender, 7th Baronet (father)

Victor Alexander George Anthony Warrender, 1st Baron Bruntisfield, MC (23 June 1899 – 14 January 1993), known as Sir Victor Warrender, Bt, between 1917 and 1942, was a British Conservative politician. He held minor political offices between 1928 and 1945, notably as Parliamentary and Financial Secretary to the Admiralty from 1940 to 1945 in Winston Churchill's war-time coalition government. In 1942 he was ennobled as Baron Bruntisfield. He is also said to be the first politician Margaret Thatcher looked up to before beginning her career in politics.

== Background and education ==
Warrender was the eldest son of Vice-Admiral Sir George Warrender, 7th Baronet, by Lady Ethel Maud Ashley-Cooper, daughter of Anthony Ashley-Cooper, 8th Earl of Shaftesbury. He was baptised with Queen Victoria as one of his godparents and was educated at Eton. His younger brother was the actor Harold Warrender. He served as a Lieutenant in the Grenadier Guards in the First World War and was awarded the Military Cross.

== Political career ==
Warrender was elected Member of Parliament (MP) for Grantham in 1923, a seat he held until 1942. He was Parliamentary Private Secretary to the Under-Secretary of State for India, Lord Winterton, from 1924 to 1928 and entered the government as an Assistant Government Whip under Stanley Baldwin in 1928, a post he held until the government fell in 1929. He was appointed a Lord of the Treasury (government whip) in 1931 under Ramsay MacDonald, was promoted to Vice-Chamberlain of the Household in 1932 and to Comptroller of the Household in May 1935.

After Baldwin became prime minister for the third time in June 1935, Warrender was made Parliamentary and Financial Secretary to the Admiralty. Then in November 1935 he exchanged this office for that of Financial Secretary to the War Office. He continued in this post when Neville Chamberlain became prime minister in 1937. When Chamberlain reshuffled his government in early April 1940, Warrender once again became Parliamentary and Financial Secretary to the Admiralty. He retained this office when Winston Churchill became prime minister in May 1940, and continued in it until Churchill resigned in July 1945. On 10 March 1942 Warrender was elevated to the peerage as Baron Bruntisfield, of Boroughmuir in the City of Edinburgh.

== Family ==
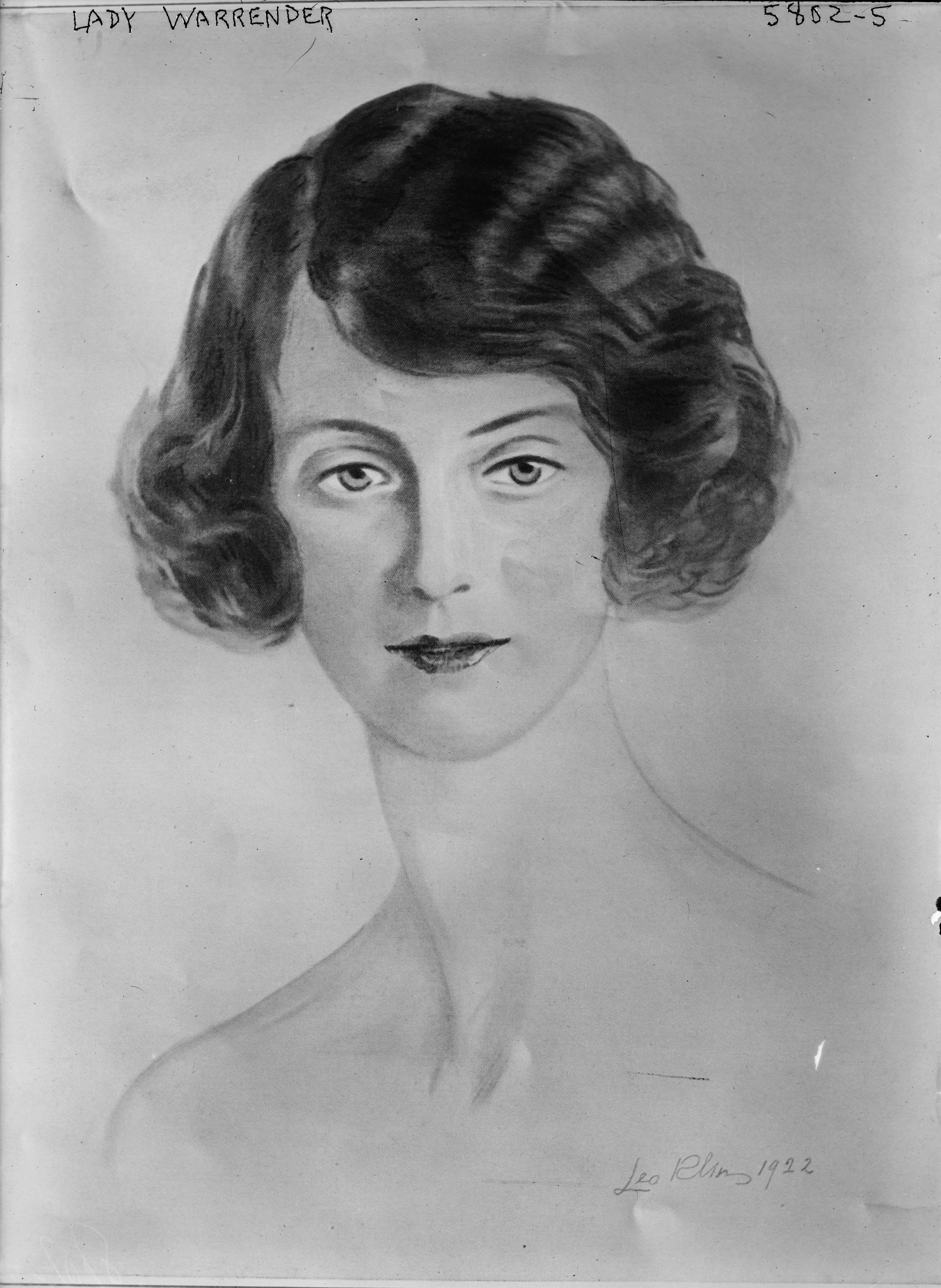
Dorothy Rawson

Lord Bruntisfield married Dorothy Rawson (d. 1975), daughter of Col Richard Hamilton Rawson, MP for Reigate, on 1 June 1920. They had three children:

- John Warrender, 2nd Baron Bruntisfield (7 February 1921 – 14 July 2007)
- Simon George Warrender (11 August 1922 – 8 May 2011), married Pamela Myer – built Bruntisfield House Melbourne and had issue – Edwina Jane Maitland (11 Dec. 1951–), Alicia Maude Grisel (30 Mar. 1953–), Alexander Simon Victor Shaftsbury (14 June 1955 – 23 August 1976 / Member Falls Creek Ski Patrol), Simon George Norman Angus Hamilton Warrender (13 June 1962–)
- Robin Hugh Warrender (24 December 1927 – 8 April 2004), married Gillian ("Gilly") Elizabeth Rossiter, daughter of Leonard and Elsie Rose (née Oppenheimer) Rossiter. They had three children, Carolyn Robin Warrender, Annabel Rose Warrender and Hugh Mark Warrender.

Lord and Lady Bruntisfield were divorced in 1945. Lady Bruntisfield was later invested as an Officer, Most Venerable Order of the Hospital of St. John of Jerusalem (O.St.J.). She died in July 1975. Lord Bruntisfield married secondly, Tania, daughter of Dr Michael Kolin, on 22 June 1948. They had two children:

- Anthony Michael Warrender (b. 17 July 1950), married (1) Christine Semenenko, (2) Patricia Connors and had issue.
- Victoria Isabella Warrender (b. 27 March 1952), married Hugh Mackay, 14th Lord Reay as his second wife on 20 June 1980 and has issue, two daughters.

Lord Bruntisfield died in January 1993, aged 93, and was succeeded by his eldest son, John. Tania, Lady Bruntisfield died in June 2007.

Parliament of the United Kingdom
Preceded by Robert Pattinson	Member of Parliament for Grantham; 1923–1942	Succeeded by Denis Kendall
Political offices
Preceded by Sir Frederick Penny	Vice-Chamberlain of the Household; 1932–1935	Succeeded by Lambert Ward
Preceded by Sir Frederick Penny	Comptroller of the Household; May–June 1935	Succeeded by George Bowyer
Preceded by Lord Stanley	Parliamentary and Financial Secretary to the Admiralty; June–November 1935	Succeeded by Lord Stanley
Preceded by Douglas Hacking	Financial Secretary to the War Office; 1935–1940	Succeeded by Sir Edward Grigg
Preceded by Geoffrey Shakespeare	Parliamentary and Financial Secretary to the Admiralty; 1940–1945	Succeeded by John Dugdale
Peerage of the United Kingdom
New creation	Baron Bruntisfield; 1942–1993	Succeeded by John Warrender
Baronetage of Great Britain
Preceded by George Warrender	Baronet (of Lochend); 1917–1993	Succeeded by John Warrender
