= Eric Smith (British politician) =

British politician (1908–1951)

Eric Martin Smith (28 December 1908 – 13 August 1951) was a British Conservative Party politician. He was a noted amateur golfer, winning the Amateur Championship in 1931 and representing England against Scotland and Ireland the same year.

Smith was the son of Everard Martin Smith and Violet, the daughter of Everard Hambro. He was educated at Eton College and Pembroke College, Cambridge.

At the 1950 general election, he was returned as the Member of Parliament (MP) for the Grantham constituency in Lincolnshire. He replaced the independent MP, Denis Kendall, who had been first elected in a war-time by-election, but came third in 1950.

Smith died in August 1951, aged 42, of a heart attack, at his home in Hitchin, Hertfordshire. His death did not trigger a by-election. The seat remained vacant until the 1951 general election, on 25 October.

Parliament of the United Kingdom
Preceded by Denis Kendall	Member of Parliament for Grantham; 1950–1951	Succeeded by Joseph Godber
