= Denis Kendall =

British politician

Member of Parliament for Grantham
- In office 25 March 1942 – 3 February 1950
- Preceded by: Victor Warrender
- Succeeded by: Eric Smith

Personal details
- Born: 27 May 1903 Halifax, United Kingdom
- Died: 19 July 1995 (Aged 92) Los Angeles, USA
- Party: Independent (until 1950); Liberal (from 1950)

William Denis Kendall, (27 May 1903 – 19 July 1995), was an engineer, businessman, and politician. During World War II he was Managing Director of the armaments firm British Manufacture and Research Co (BMARC), and from 1942-1950, he was the Member of Parliament for Grantham. In 1952 he emigrated to United States and set up American Manufacture and Research Co to build small diesel engines.

== Early life ==
William Denis Kendall was born in Halifax, West Yorkshire. When he was fourteen, he ran away to sea and made £5,000—a huge sum at the time—helping police raid opium dens along China's Yangtze River before running a waterfront cabaret in Shanghai. He then relocated to the US as a steeplejack. Later, he went to work for a Philadelphia car plant and eventually became works manager for the Paris Citroen car factory.

== Career ==
In 1938, Kendall went to Grantham, Lincolnshire, and became Managing Director of British Manufacture And Research Co (BMARC), which was set up by the French subsidiary of Hispano-Suiza and Lord Brownlow to manufacture aircraft cannon. Kendall became a member or affiliate of the British National Party (BNP). Kendall attracted the notice of the British security service for his Fascist sympathies, his suspected German links, his possible involvement in arms trafficking and his notorious indiscretion. By 1942, MI5 security service files describe him as a "larger than life" figure.

He won the parliamentary seat of Grantham in a 1942 by-election when he defeated the National Government candidate by just 367 votes. When he won the by-election, the magazine Picture Post published a lengthy interview with accompanying action pictures and the eye-catching quote: "I won't sit down and I won't shut up". As the Managing Director for the British Manufacture and Research Company in Grantham, Kendall had controversial views on war production, which he took every opportunity to publicise. He learnt his engineering skills at car factories in the US and France. His factory was highly productive, where workers were well-paid and provided with endless music and dance parties. He hired an organ and cinema organist to entertain them.

He retained the seat in July 1945 with an increased majority of 15,513. He developed plans to produce a "People's Car", and displayed a prototype outside Parliament in August 1945. A company, Grantham Productions, was set up to manufacture the car, and also agricultural tractors. He failed to secure adequate finance, despite the promise of funds from the Jamsahib of Nawanagar, India, and the company went into liquidation. The plans and tooling for the car were sold to Hartnett of Australia, and the tractor factory was sold to Newman Tractors. In August 1945 he also set up Grantham Publications, which published the weekly Grantham Guardian from November 1945 to December 1950.

He was defeated in the 1950 General Election, and again in the 1951 General Election. In 1952, he moved to the US, and set up the American Manufacture and Research Co (American MARC) in Inglewood, California to produce small diesel engines. This was sold in 1961 and he then set up Dynapower Systems Corporation and Dynapower Medionics.

== National Archive files ==
Three files available in The National Archives reveal that Kendall had come to the attention of the Security Service well-before his election. Shortly after his election, a reporter visiting his office saw that he had letters pinned up from Winston Churchill, King George VI and Lord Beaverbrook commending him for his part in the rescue of four people from a bombed house. However, the security files also showed how Beaverbrook, then Minister for Aircraft Production, had raised concerns about Kendall's activities. The file at the National Archives suggests real fears that Kendall planned to smuggle secret plans for a new 20mm aircraft cannon out of the UK to America.

As a result of Beaverbrook's intervention, Kendall's letters were intercepted, as were those of his wife, Virginia. She despaired of his lavish lifestyle; and in one letter to a US friend, wrote:

"...[he] has completely lost his head... has one woman friend after another... spends thousands on silver and diamonds... some day the British people will want to know what is happening".

The Security Service MI5, continued to watch his activities, and expressed concerns that he was carelessly revealing wartime production figures in his election hustings speeches in a way that breached the Official Secrets and the Defence of the Realm Acts. Kendall's popularity however, thwarted any attempt to arrest him.

The files cover Kendall's election in 1942, including copies and summaries of his speeches. His victory was a surprise. He had initially been supported by the local Labour Party, which then withdrew support on orders from headquarters. A file minute of 14 September 1944 summarises the low opinion in which the Service held him

"The not very satisfactory Member of Parliament is said to boast that he can get his own way on everything."

A copy of the Picture Post article featuring the interview is included in the National Archives files. The files go on to record speculation about his presumed post-war gun running and smuggling activities in India, the Netherlands and Palestine, involving Kendall's boat Tao Tien, which had a double hull for concealing illicit items.

In 1949 a court ordered him to repay £15,000 provided by a private donor as an investment, but which he tried to use to pay off creditors. The security files also disclose that MI5 also kept close eyes on another company, Russian Oil Products, which was suspected of being a cover for Soviet espionage though Kendall's involvement, if any, is unclear. The company was sold to Regent Oil Company in 1948, the forebear of Texaco in the UK.

Kendall lost his seat as an MP at the 1950 election. Interest in him appears to have declined after 1953. The files contain summary reports of his ongoing activities, and a career summary from 1950 concludes that

"during the war he was involved in the Black Market and there is in fact little doubt that he is a currency smuggler".

The files record his close association with leading right-wing extremists throughout.

== Other information ==
Manthorpe News

An article posted in the web site "Manthorpe News" has a picture of Clark Gable, Lord Brownlow and Kendall taken around 1943 with Gable in US Army uniform with the rank of captain. The caption indicates that Gable was on a morale-boosting visit to Kendall's factory. The cutting is from the Grantham Journal, a newspaper still in publication. Gable was posted to RAF Polebrook in 1943, in Northamptonshire but not far from Grantham.

The website also publishes a report headed "British MARCo military history of the second world war as seen by William Denis Kendall" (undated but presumably post-war) with the following quote:

[...] "About this time the Ministry of Aircraft Production came into being headed by Lord Beaverbrook with Lord Brownlow being his Parliamentary Private Secretary.

All guns and shells were produced to equip our Spitfires and Hurricane fighter planes[,] 4 cannons per plane.

When world war2 [sic] heated up and the bombing of Britain commenced, few people realised that my factories were the most bombed in the country, and during the raids I lost approximately 200 of my workpeople killed and wounded when their shelter sustained a direct hit. I had a fine medical staff of three doctors and thirty nurses out of a total 7,800 employees" [...]

.

Grantham was said (Note: (according to the BMARC Wikipedia page)) to have received 21 raids by the Luftwaffe, which killed 70 people in 1941, around the Commercial Road area. This is in the town centre and north of Springfield Road where Kendall's factory was.

Kendall's wife, Virginia

The following posting was made by Anne Tracy's brother, William Tracy, and his wife Lillian, of Portsmouth, OH, USA on this site:

Denis Kendall's wife, Virginia, was my first cousin. She was the daughter of my mother Anne, born "Anna Laura". She became a ballroom dancing instructor there, and escaped Portsmouth for Paris in the mid to late 1930s. In Paris she found work, also as a dancing instructor. One day Denis Kendall came to her studio to take some lessons. The charming Englishman literally "swept her off her feet" so to speak. They married immediately and of course she moved to Grantham.

Virginia was a tall, lithe redhead with very large, expressive blue eyes, charming and with the grace of a dancer. She was cheerful, and a real tease with small boys like me. They (both, I believe) were dual-citizens and so needed to touch base in America from time to time. It was on such an occasion, during which they merely stayed the required minimum time in a hotel in New York, that I met Denis when I was about 10 or 11, let's say 1938 or 9, possibly as late as 1940. The war was on but we were not yet in it. Atlantic travel was restricted but they had special access because of his war work. Denis utterly charmed me, my parents and everyone around us, as he seems to have done with everyone. I recall his telling me a long involved story about capturing a German U-boat single-handedly by surrounding it on his white horse!

We knew that Virginia worked for the OSS, but all we knew beyond that was that she was attached to the Manhattan Project. The marriage ended in divorce, and I remember that there was a great deal of pussyfooting around the reasons for it in the family ("He was cruel to her" and so on). In the light of the recent evidence about Denis, one wonders of he was the reason why the disaffected wife was recruited by the OSS. I suppose we will never know. One also wonders if he was up to something on those New York visits! One has to make a certain allowance for the fact that he was passing secrets to us, but I suppose the British can take a dim view of even that. Seems to me more like industrial espionage.

She returned to Paris after the war where she met and married Colonel Thomas Davis, then attached to NATO headquarters with whom she had her only child, a daughter, Tracy Davis.

== Notes ==
Parliament of the United Kingdom
Preceded by Victor Warrender	Member of Parliament for Grantham; 1942– 1950	Succeeded by Eric Smith
