= John Warrender, 2nd Baron Bruntisfield =

British soldier, farmer and politician (1921–2007)

The Right Honourable The Lord Bruntisfield OBE MC TD
- Born: 7 February 1921; Edinburgh, Scotland
- Died: 14 July 2007 (aged 86); Edinburgh, Scotland
- Education: Royal Military College, Sandhurst
- Spouse(s): Moireen Campbell (m. 1948; died 1976) Shirley Crawley (m. 1977; died 1981) Jan Graham (m. 1985)
- Children: 4
- Father: Victor Warrender
- Relatives: Simon Warrender (brother)
- Military career
- Rank: Brigadier
- Units: North Somerset Yeomanry; 44th Royal Tank Regiment; Royal Company of Archers
- Wars: World War II
- Awards: Military Cross; Territorial Decoration

John Robert Warrender, 2nd Baron Bruntisfield, OBE MC TD (7 February 1921 – 14 July 2007) was a Scottish soldier, farmer and Conservative politician.

== Biography ==
Warrender was born in Edinburgh. He was the eldest son of Sir Victor Warrender, 8th Baronet, and his first wife, Dorothy Rawson. His father served as Conservative MP for Grantham from 1923 to 1942, when he was created 1st Baron Bruntisfield.

Warrender studied at Eton College and then the Royal Military College, Sandhurst, from where he was commissioned into the Royal Scots Greys. He stood 6 ft 4 in high, and was powerfully built. He won the Military Cross for his actions while serving at a lieutenant in Italy in November 1942. It was later rumoured that his actions could have merited a Victoria Cross. He served as adjutant of the regiment, and was an Aide-de-camp to the Governor of Madras from 1946 to 1948. He became a farmer when he retired from the Army. He was lieutenant colonel of the newly amalgamated North Somerset Yeomanry and 44th Royal Tank Regiment from 1957 to 1962, and was awarded the Territorial Decoration in 1967. He later joined the Royal Company of Archers, and was a Brigadier from 1973 to 1985.

He received the OBE in 1963, and stood as the Conservative candidate for the safe Labour seat of Pontypridd in the 1964 general election, losing to the incumbent, Labour's Arthur Pearson, by a wide margin. He became Deputy Lieutenant of Somerset in 1965. He inherited the barony on the death of his father in 1993, but was excluded from the House of Lords by the House of Lords Act 1999.

He married three times. He was first married to (Ann) Moireen Campbell in 1948. They had two sons and two daughters, one of his granddaughters being Alice Warrender (born 1983), a former investment manager who became a devout Catholic writer, painter and artist following a radical conversion. She died in 1976, and he remarried, to Shirley Crawley (née Ross), in 1977. His second wife died in 1981, and he remarried again, to Jan Graham (née Joanna Kathleen Chancellor), in 1985. He died in Edinburgh.

His heir was his son, Michael (b. 9 January 1949), who became the 3rd Baron. He is married and has a son, John Michael Patrick Caspar Warrender (b. 1 June 1996).

Peerage of the United Kingdom
Preceded by Victor Warrender	Baron Bruntisfield; 1993–2007	Succeeded by Michael Warrender
