= High Commission of Papua New Guinea, London =

High Commission of Papua New Guinea in London
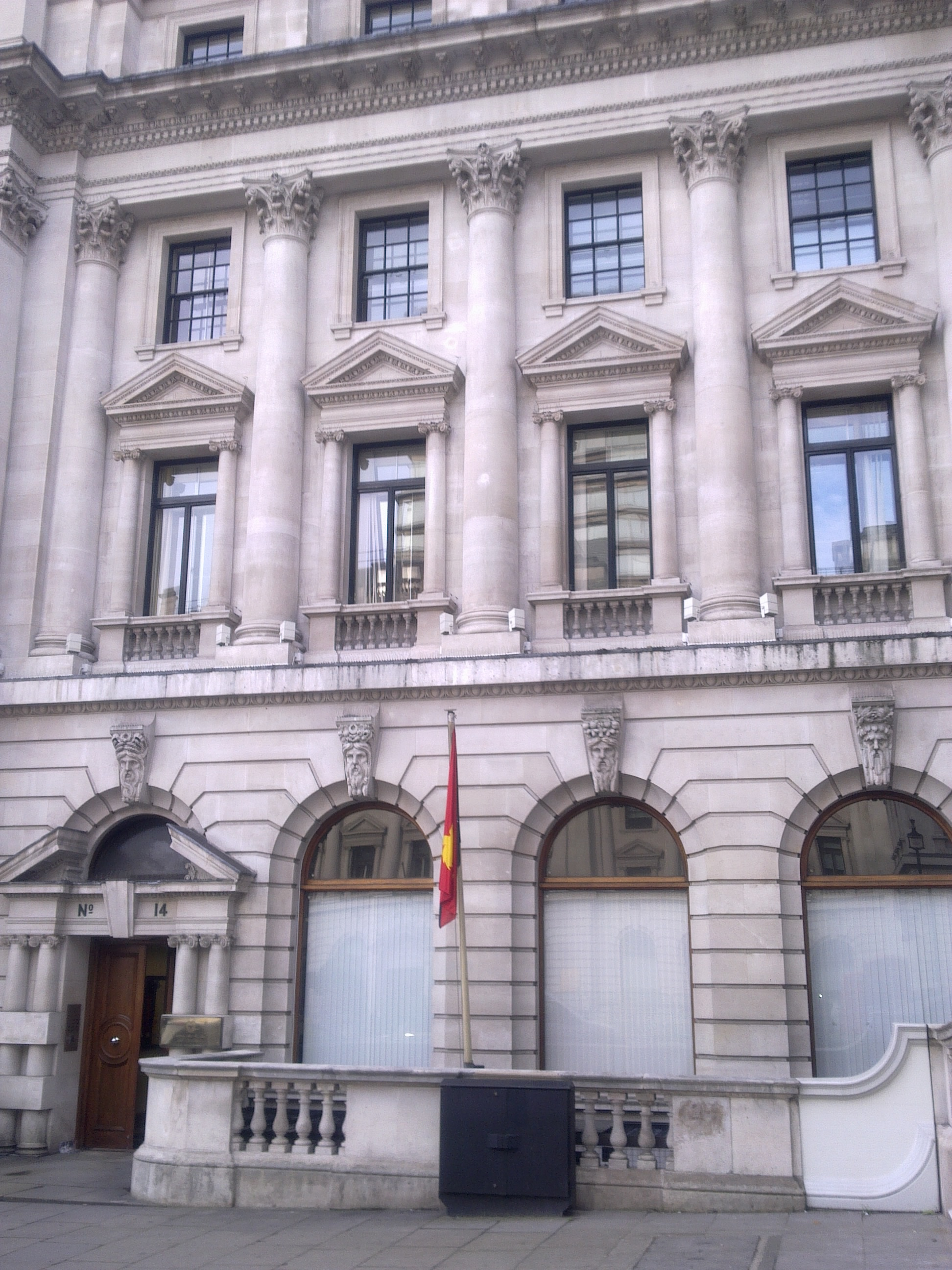
- Location: St James's, London
- Address: 14 Waterloo Place, London, SW1Y 4AR
- Coordinates: 51°30′26.8″N 0°7′59.7″W
- High Commissioner: Winnie Anna Kiap

The High Commission of Papua New Guinea in London is the diplomatic mission of Papua New Guinea in the United Kingdom. In line with other Papuan diplomatic missions it is also referred to as Kundu London, after the traditional Papuan kundu drum. The High Commission was established in 1975, the year of Papua New Guinea's independence from Australia.

== Gallery ==
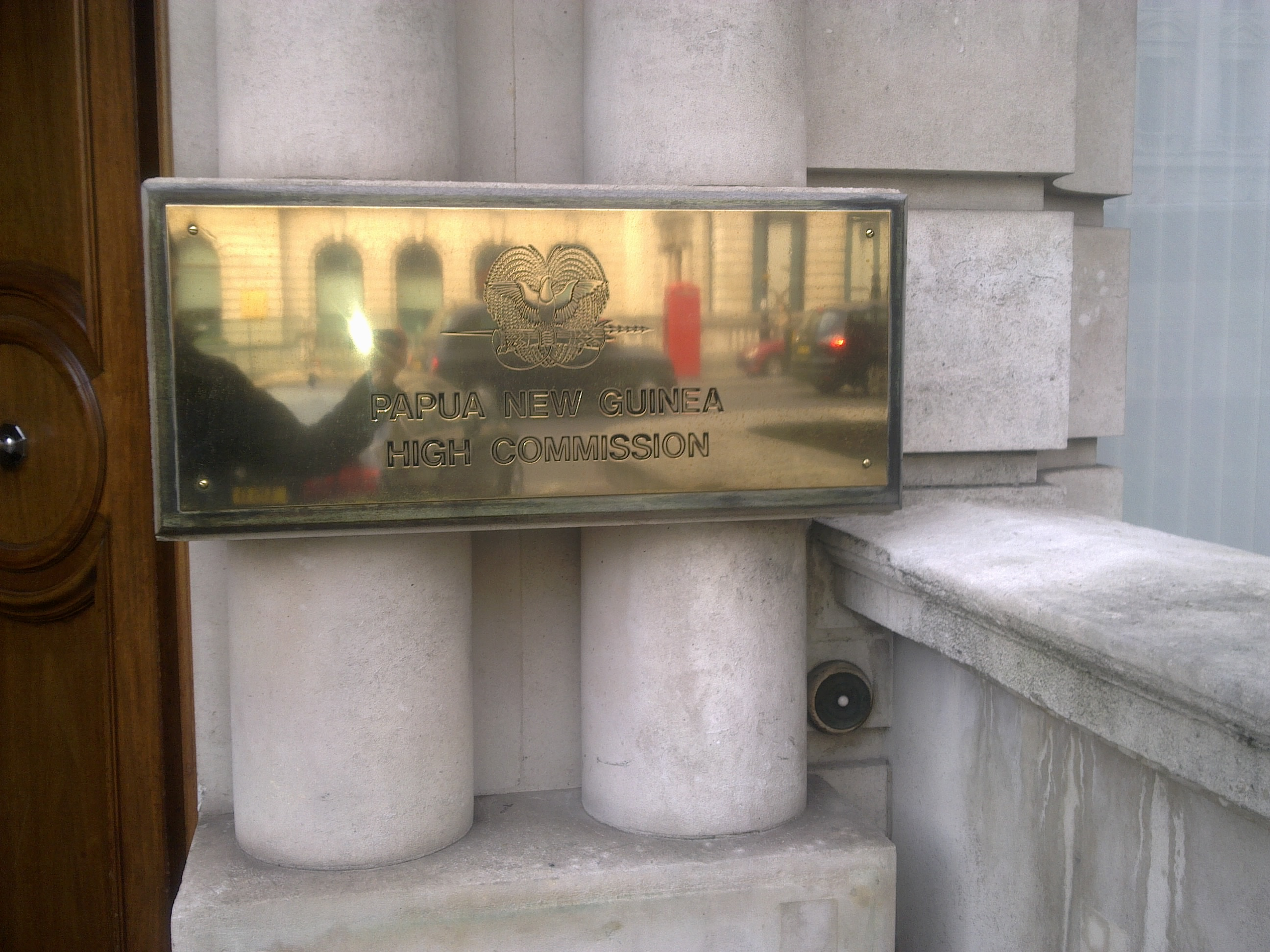
Plaque outside the embassy depicting the Emblem of Papua New Guinea

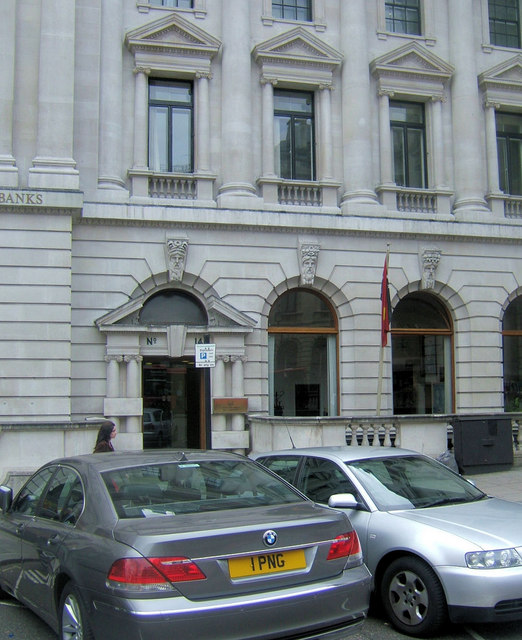
The High Commission
