= High Commission of Singapore, London =

Diplomatic mission of Singapore in the United Kingdom

High Commission of the Republic of Singapore in London
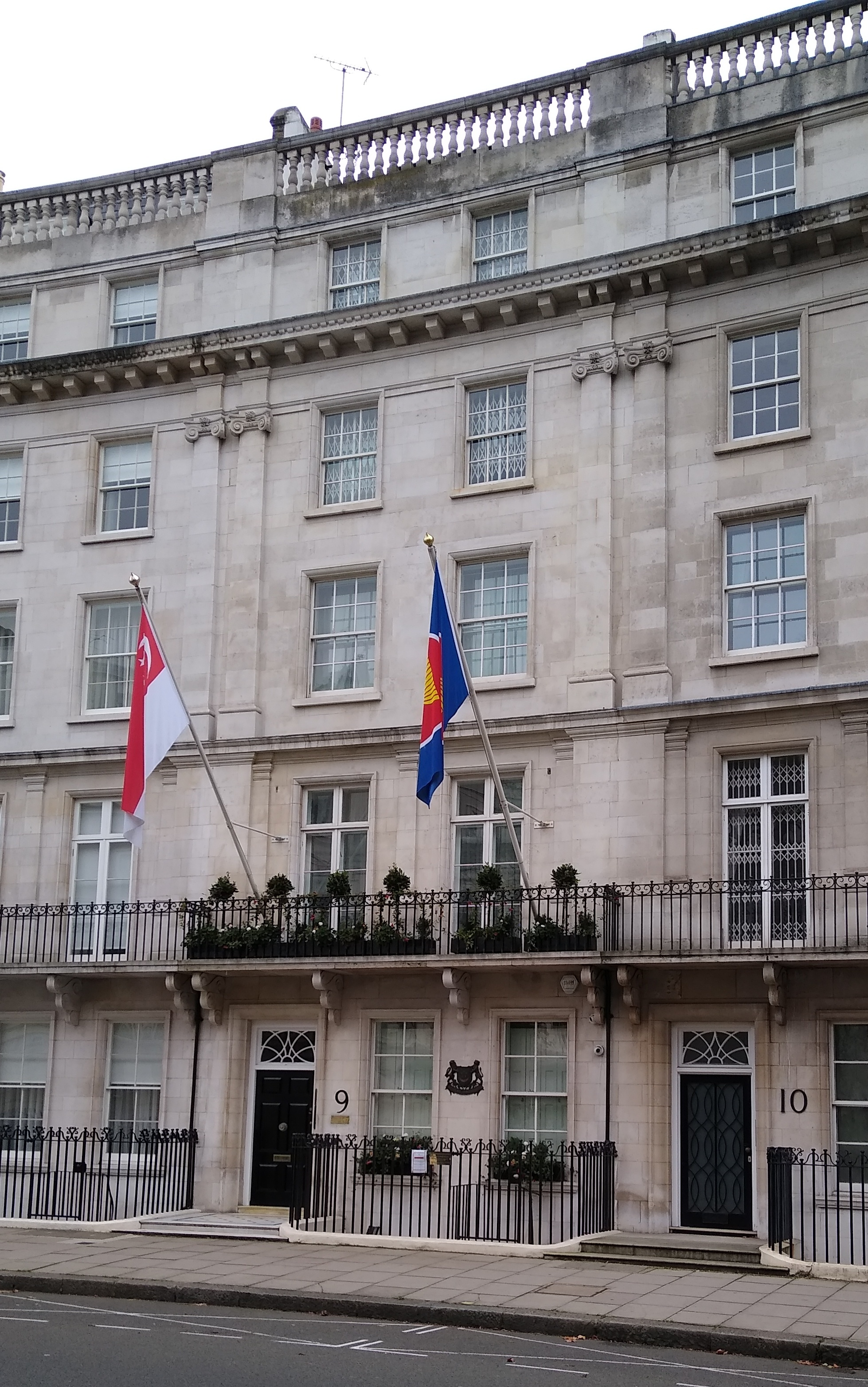
- Location: Belgravia, London
- Address: 9 Wilton Crescent, London, SW1X 8SP
- Coordinates: 51°30′1″N 0°9′22.7″W
- High Commissioner: Ng Teck Hean

The High Commission of the Republic of Singapore in London is the diplomatic mission of Singapore in the United Kingdom. Also accredited as the Embassy of Singapore to Ireland and Iceland.

The building forms one of a group of Grade II listed stucco buildings along the western side of Wilton Crescent, in the Belgravia district.

== Gallery ==
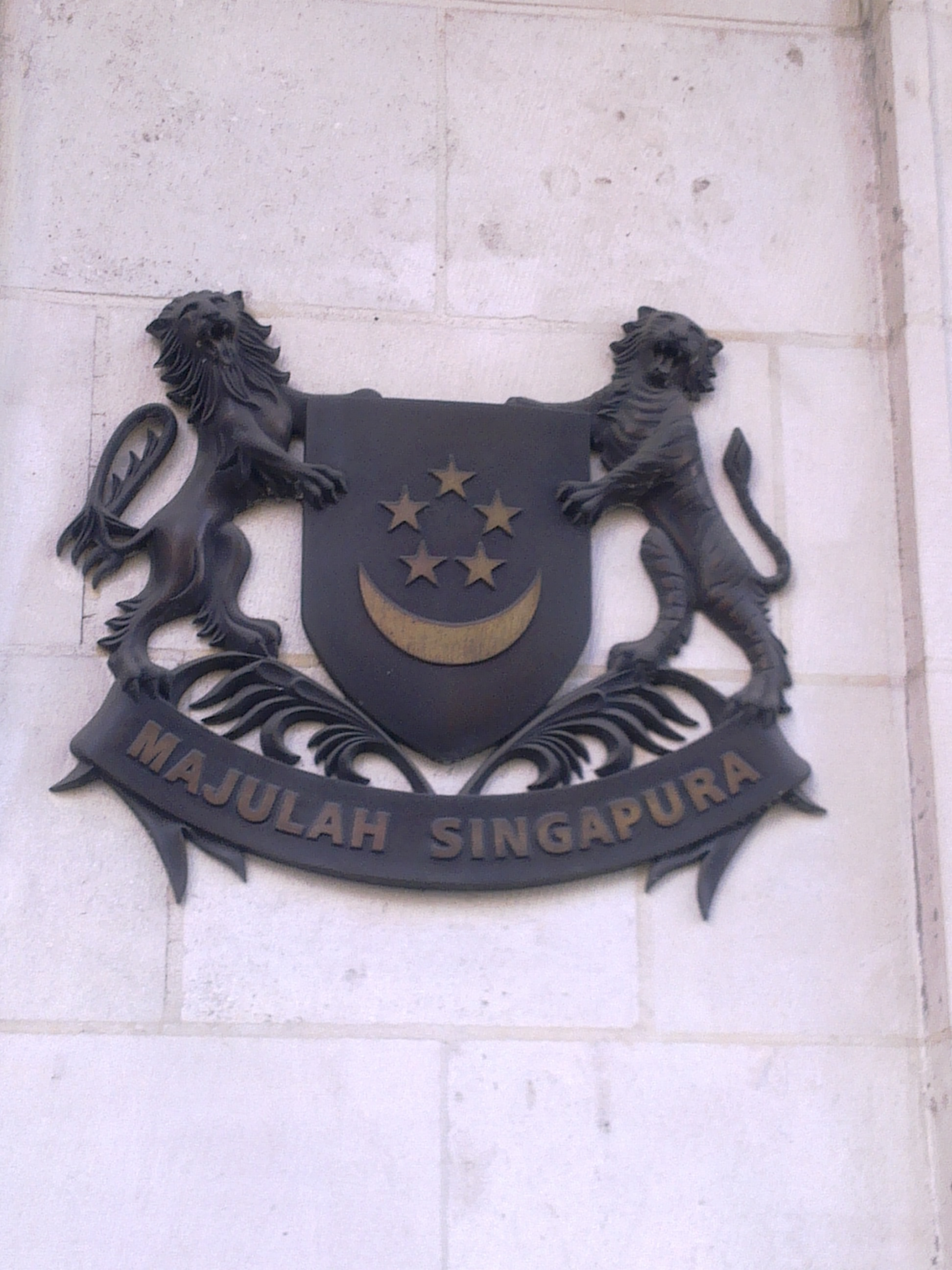
Plaque outside the High Commission depicting the Coat of arms of Singapore

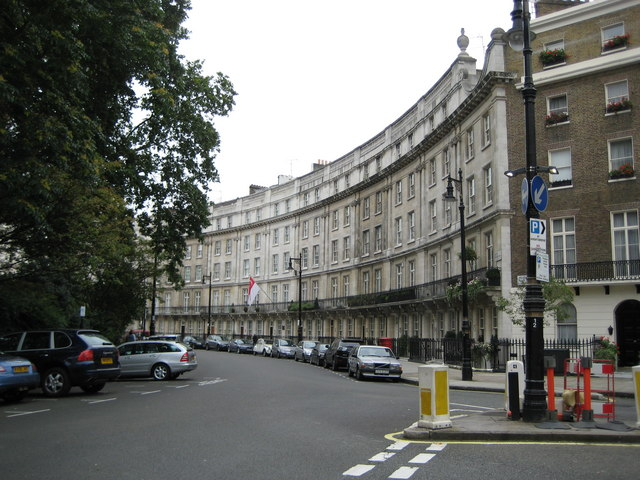
Wilton Crescent with the High Commission in the distance
