= Sir George Warrender, 7th Baronet =

Royal Navy officer (1860–1917)

Vice-Admiral Sir George Warrender KCB KCVO
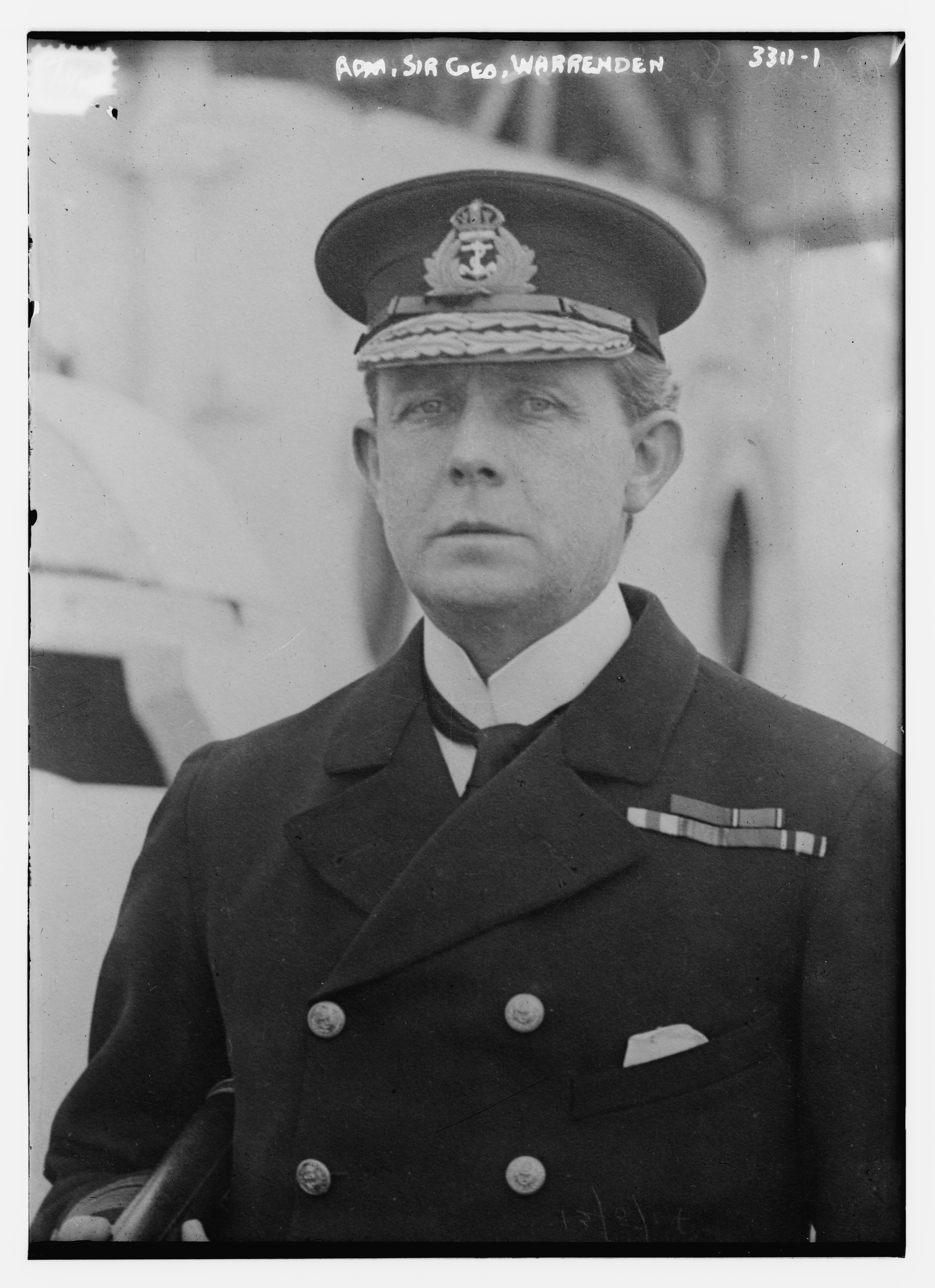
- Born: 31 July 1860; Edinburgh, Midlothian, Scotland
- Died: 8 January 1917 (aged 56); London, England
- Military career
- Allegiance: United Kingdom
- Branch: Royal Navy
- Service years: 1873–1916
- Rank: Vice-Admiral
- Commands: East India Squadron; 2nd Battle Squadron; Plymouth Command
- Conflicts: Zulu War; Boxer Rebellion; World War I
- Awards: Knight Commander of the Order of the Bath; Knight Commander of the Royal Victorian Order

Vice-Admiral Sir George John Scott Warrender, 7th Baronet, KCB, KCVO (31 July 1860 – 8 January 1917) was a Royal Navy officer during World War I.

== Early career ==
Warrender was the son of Sir George Warrender, 6th Baronet and Helen Purves-Hume-Campbell, born at Bruntsfield House, Edinburgh, one of six children. Warrender joined the navy as a cadet in 1873 at Dartmouth. He qualified as a French interpreter in 1878. He served in the Zulu War in 1879 as midshipman on the corvette HMS Boadicea. As a member of the naval brigade he was part of the force sent to relieve Eshowe and was present at the Battle of Gingindlovu, so receiving the South Africa medal. In 1880 he was promoted to Lieutenant, specialising in gunnery.

He was a staff officer at HMS Excellent between 1884 and 1885, the second lieutenant on the cruiser Amphion from 11 December 1888 serving on the Pacific Station, It listed her commissioned and warrant officers as follows: and was promoted to commander in 1893. He commanded the royal yacht HMY Victoria and Albert between 1896 and 1899.

He was appointed captain on 13 May 1899. He fought in the Boxer Rebellion in 1900 as flag captain to Rear-Admiral Sir James Andrew Thomas Bruce and commander of HMS Barfleur (1899–1902). It was announced in the 1902 Coronation Honours that he would be appointed a Companion of the Order of the Bath (CB) dated 26 June 1902, and he received the actual decoration after his return home, from King Edward VII at Buckingham Palace on 24 October 1902.

He was captain of HMS Lancaster in the Mediterranean between 1904 and 1905, followed by the command of HMS Carnavon, also in the Mediterranean from 1905. From 1907 to 1908 he was Aide-de-Camp to King Edward VII and on 2 July 1908 he was promoted to Rear Admiral. He served as Commander in chief of the East Indies Station from 1907 to 1909. He became commander of the second cruiser squadron in 1910, serving as such until 1912, and was awarded KCVO in 1911. He became commander of the 2nd Battle Squadron, with the new dreadnought battleship HMS King George V as his flagship, in 1912, holding the command until December 1915, and was awarded KCB in 1913. He was promoted to Vice-Admiral on 4 June 1913.

== 1914 Kiel Review ==
In June 1914, just before the outbreak of the First World War his squadron visited the German naval port of Kiel, during the annual regatta attended by Kaiser Wilhelm II and senior German admirals. The objective was to show off the modern British ships, and also inspect the German fleet. During the week-long visit, news arrived of the assassination of Archduke Franz Ferdinand of Austria. Warrender's final message of farewell, in line with the spirit of the visit and the welcome which they had received, was Friends in the past, friends forever.

During his tour, a German officer, Lieutenant George von Hase, was selected to accompany Warrender and act as his aide and translator. Hase was required to write a report about Warrender and other British officers he met, and later wrote a book describing the visit. He described Warrender as clean shaven and good looking, with an aristocratic face and fine blue eyes. He seemed around 50 with greying hair, but retained the vigour of a younger man. He appeared self-possessed and decided and was popular amongst his men because of his care for their concerns. Business was handled with short orders and short replies, so that despite an absence of military formalities everything was done professionally. Warrender was noticeably deaf: He could understand his staff without problem, but could sometimes have difficulty with other officers and strangers, particularly in a noisy environment such as a party. At dinner, seated with the Kaiser unfortunately on his deaf side, he had difficulty maintaining the conversation. He was reputed to be a good tennis player and splendid golfer.

The Admiral's wife accompanied him on the visit, staying on board the Hamburg-Amerika liner Viktoria Luise, which was customarily berthed in Kiel every year for Kiel week. This ship became the centre of high society for the occasion. There was a hectic round of social engagements, where the admiral had to be whisked between simultaneous events so as to be seen attending. Sporting competitions were arranged between British and German teams. Hase noted that the Germans won most of the events, except for football. He described the British sailors as noticeably small, while 70 men from George V were under 17 and he considered that there was a disproportionate number of older men.

German and British ships saluting the Kaiser, 24 June 1914

Hase was instructed by Warrender to convey an invitation to Admiral von Ingenohl for any German officers who wished to visit and inspect the British ships. Ingenohl declined, on the grounds that he was forbidden to show visitors many parts of his ships. Warrender responded that, of course, some parts of British ships would also be off-limits and that he understood such restrictions, so visits were eventually arranged. British officers were only allowed to visit the older Deutschland class battleships, while important installations on British ships were covered. However, Hase reported that he was friendly with Commander Brownrigg, the gunnery officer, was happy to show him around almost all the ship, except for the 'firing director' which was regarded as strictly secret. Lord Brassey, who had arrived at Kiel on his own yacht, managed to become lost, and was found wandering in the secret submarine yard.

On the afternoon of 28 June news arrived of the assassination of Franz Ferdinand, who had been a friend of the British ambassador to Germany, Edward Goschen, who was also staying on George V. A discussion ensued at which Hase was present, where Warrender warned of the likelihood that many European countries would now be drawn into a war. Social engagements were cancelled, although the regatta events were completed.

Early the following morning the Kaiser departed for Vienna. The day continued on a somber note, with lunch on board George V for German admirals. Afterwards these were invited to tour the ship, but only Admiral Ingenohl and his officers accepted, and were given a demonstration of the main guns operating. Later Warrender attended a party given by British sailors for their German counterparts in return for the welcome they had received. Warrender was welcomed by a wave of thunderous stamping, and jumped onto a table to give a speech about friendship between the two nations. Three cheers were given for the German Navy, before Rear Admiral Mauve climbed on the table to respond and call three cheers for the British. The room once again resounded to stamping approval. In the evening Warrender attended the official Imperial Yacht club dinner, now presided over by Prince Henry, in the Kaiser's absence.

Hase commented on conversations with Warrender about the consequences of submarines on warfare. Although Warrender did not agree with views expressed by Admiral Percy Scott that submarines would bring an end to Britain's control of the seas, he did agree that in future close blockade would be impossible. He observed that the preparation of Scapa Flow as a long range naval base for the blockade of Germany, had been suggested by German officers.

== First World War ==
Shortly after the Kiel visit Warrender temporarily commanded the Grand Fleet ordered to move to Scapa Flow after annual exercises, when a declaration of war was considered imminent.

Warrender was considered a good admiral during peacetime, but his reputation suffered as the war proceeded. His squadron was regarded as one of the best trained in gunnery in the fleet. He was described by Commodore William Goodenough as having "an imperturbability that no circumstances could ruffle", although others ascribed this stolidity simply to a lack of initiative.

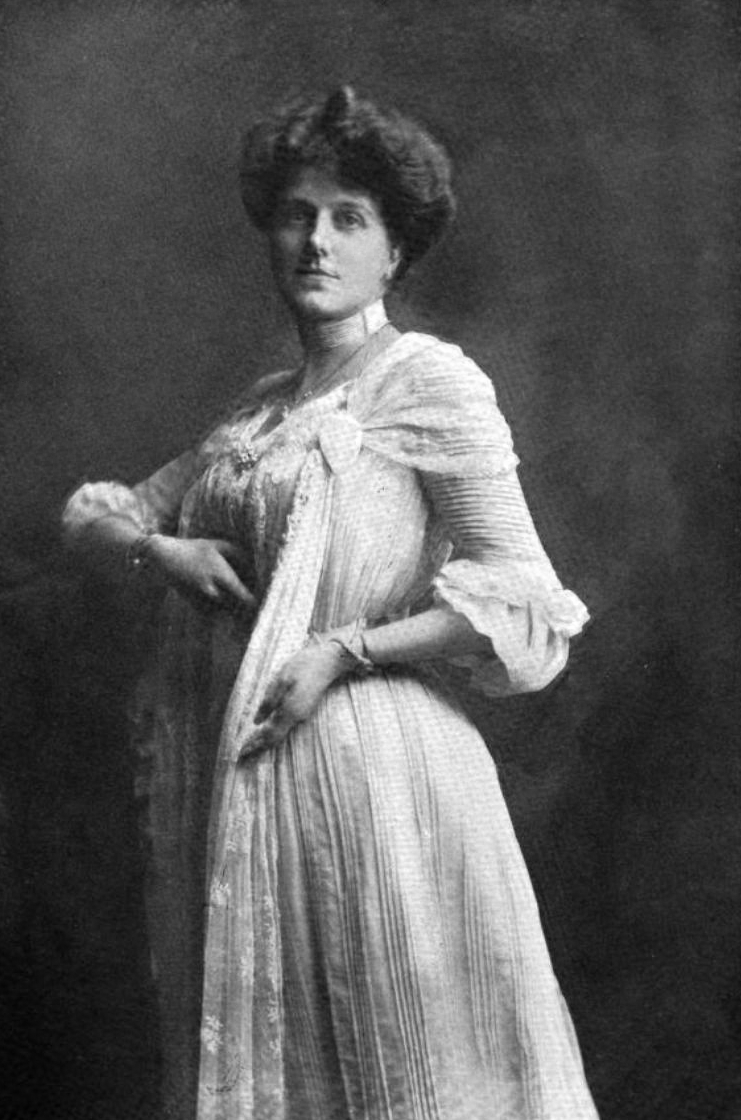
Lady Ethel Maud Warrender in 1903

One of the battleships in his command, HMS Audacious, sank after striking a mine when at sea for gunnery practice in October 1914. He commanded a British squadron of six battleships, four battlecruisers, cruisers and destroyers which attempted to intercept Admiral Hipper following Hipper's raid on Scarborough. Hipper escaped, some of his ships slipping past Warrender despite being spotted and coming within range of his superior force. First Sea Lord Fisher wanted Warrender replaced for his poor performance, but Warrender was a friend of Admiral John Jellicoe commanding the Grand Fleet, who kept him in his post because of his past experience handling large fleets. Warrender was also suffering from increasing deafness and was replaced in December 1915. He became Commander-in-Chief, Plymouth in March 1916, but asked for retirement in December 1916 because of increasingly poor health. He died in January 1917, was cremated at Golders Green on 12 January and his ashes placed at the Church of the Annunciation, Bryanston Street, London.

== Family ==
One of his sisters, Alice Warrender, founded the Hawthornden Prize. He married Lady Ethel Maud Ashley Cooper, daughter of Anthony Ashley-Cooper, 8th Earl of Shaftesbury, on 6 February 1894 at St. Paul's Church, Knightsbridge, London. He had three children, Sir Victor Alexander George Anthony Warrender 8th Bt., 1st Baron Bruntisfield (1942), Harold John Warrender and Violet Helen Marie Warrender, who married Alexander Ruthven Pym and had four children.

== Bibliography ==
- "Death of Sir George Warrender". The Times. No. 41371. London. 9 January 1917. p. 8 – via Newspapers.com.
- "Funeral of Sir G. Warrender". The Times. No. 41375. London. 13 January 1917. p. 11 – via Newspapers.com.
- Robert Massie (2004). Castles of Steel: Britain, Germany, and the Winning of the Great War at Sea. London: Johnathan Cape. ISBN 0-224-04092-8.
- Robert K. Massie (1991). Dreadnought: Britain, Germany, and the coming of the Great War. Random House. ISBN 0-394-52833-6.
- Admiral Sir William Goodenough (1943). A rough record. London and New York: Hutchinson.
- Arthur Marder (1965). From the Dreadnought to Scapa Flow Volume II, The war years :To the eve of Jutland 1914-1916. London: Oxford University Press.

Military offices
Preceded by Sir Edmund Poë	Commander-in-Chief, East Indies Station; 1907–1909	Succeeded by Sir Edmond Slade
Preceded by Sir George Egerton	Commander-in-Chief, Plymouth; March 1916–December 1916	Succeeded by Sir Alexander Bethell
Baronetage of Great Britain
Preceded by George Warrender	Baronet (of Lochend); 1901–1917	Succeeded by Victor Warrender
