= Alice Warrender =

Alice Helen Warrender (16 October 1857 – 23 September 1947) was a Scottish philanthropist, who established one of Britain's earliest annual literary awards, the Hawthornden Prize, in 1919.

Alice Warrender was born at Hawthornden Castle, Scotland as the eldest of six children of Sir George Warrender, 6th Baronet (1825–1901) and Helen Purves-Hume-Campbell, daughter of Sir Hugh Purves-Hume-Campbell, 7th Baronet. Her younger brother was the admiral Sir George Warrender, 7th Baronet.

In 1919, she founded the Hawthornden Prize for a work of imaginative literature, including biography, by an English writer under the age of 41. Winners received £100 (equivalent to £4,000 in 2025) and a silver medal.

Alice Warrender was a judge on the committee awarding the prize until her death. She never married, and is buried at St Martin's Church, Ruislip.
