= BMARC =

British defence company

British Manufacture and Research Company
- Type: Private
- Industry: Arms
- Founded: 1937
- Founder: William Denis Kendall
- Defunct: 1992
- Successor: Royal Ordnance
- Headquarters: Springfield Road, Grantham, NG31 7JB
- Area served: Worldwide
- Products: Weapons
- Parent: Hispano-Suiza (1937–71); Oerlikon-Bührle (1971–88); Astra Holdings (1988–92)

BMARC (British Manufacture and Research Company) was a British firm designing and producing defence products, particularly aircraft cannon and naval anti-aircraft cannon. It was based on a 60-acre (24 ha) site on Springfield Road (part of the A607) in Grantham, Lincolnshire.

== History ==
=== Second World War ===
Created and funded under the Air Ministry's Shadow factory plan headed up by Herbert Austin, the company was founded by William Denis Kendall. Shortly after start-up during the Second World War rearmament period, Kendall became MP for Grantham from 1942 to 1950.

Lord Brownlow was Chairman. Like R&H and A-B, the site had its own fire brigade. These company fire brigades would hold an inter-company sports competition at the Grantham cricket ground, with other council fire brigades as far as Melton Mowbray, Bourne and Peterborough. It had a rifle club, and would hold inter-department competitions. The company raised money for Grantham Hospital, to buy it a new operating table, costing £330.

The factory had 7,800 employees in the war, with 2,000 women; the women made the bullets. Due to the London Blitz, the socialite Lady Ursula d'Abo returned home to nearby Leicestershire, and her father (the Duke) arranged a job for her at the factory, as women's officer. Ursula would travel the eight miles back to her home, by horse-drawn carriage, in the dark. In the darkness the horse knew the way home to Belvoir Castle. Ursula was having an affair with the managing director, which her brother Charles (the Duke from 1940 to 1999) did not like, who described the managing director as a real whole-hearted cad, of the worst type All of Ursula's three brothers saw operational service in the war.

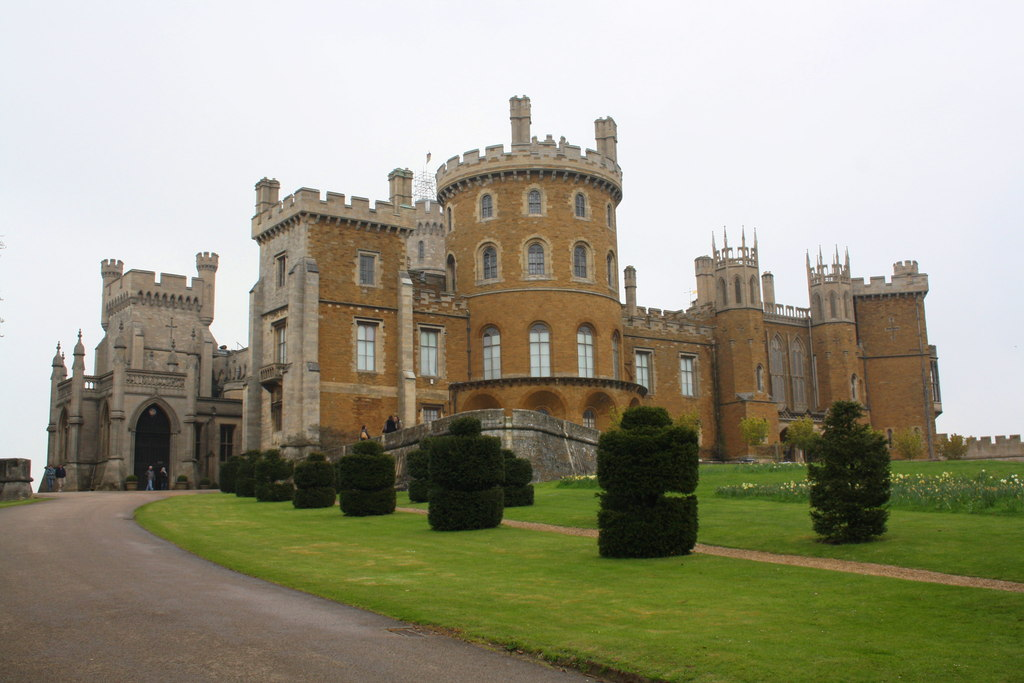
The horse knew the way home, in the dark, from the factory to Belvoir Castle, each night

The factory was not unknown to Luftwaffe personnel, and also the importance of what it made. The factory was sited next to the railway, which could be followed. German aircraft dropped many bombs in the Vale of Belvoir on the way home from the Midlands, as it was a known thoroughfare for their bomber aircraft

By 1943, its two production units fulfilled 46% of the UK's demand for the Hispano-Suiza 20 mm cannon. The remainder came from The Birmingham Small Arms Company Limited (BSA) shadow factory in Newcastle-under-Lyme, 25%; Poole Royal Ordnance Factory, 25%; and the Royal Small Arms Factory Enfield, 3%. At the time of the Battle of Britain in 1940, 20 mm cannon were only just starting to arm the Spitfire and Hurricane. By 1943, the RAF had converted entirely to cannon armament for its fighters.

Grantham received 21 raids by the Luftwaffe for precisely this reason, which killed 88 people in 1941-42 (many around the Commercial Road and Norton Street area on 9 January and 4 February in 1941). On 9 January 1941 at around 7pm, 22 people were killed, with 29 high-explosive bombs, on Commercial Road, near number 71.

In mid-October 1944, censorship restrictions were halted, and the first official list of air raids on Grantham was released, once any immediate danger of repeat attacks had disappeared. Grantham had received 197 high-explosive bombs, 500 incendiary bombs, with 71 houses destroyed. 8 people were killed in Lincoln, with 55 injured, Skegness had 36 people killed. Six people were killed in Scunthorpe.

One notable raid was on 24 October 1942 when 32 people were killed when bombs destroyed most of Stuart Street and its air-raid shelter. The Grantham Journal would refer to any attack on Grantham as 'an air raid on a Midlands town'. The October 1942 attack was in lots in moonlight, with 10 people killed in the air raid shelter. Also hit was St Catherine's Road, with 17 high-explosive bombs, and 20 houses destroyed. It is thought that the attack was to hit the No. 5 Group RAF HQ at nearby St Vincents Hall.

The Ministry of Aircraft Production site on Springfield Road was hit on Monday 27 January 1941 around 2.30pm, when a plane was shot down. The Junkers Ju 88 had taken off from Schiphol. In the raid 16 people at the factory were killed, 4 high-explosive bombs were dropped on the factory with 30 people injured. 4 houses were destroyed.

The Ju 88, A-5 4D+CT of 9./KG 30, crashed landed in a field at 3.30pm near Pilley's Lane at Fishtoft. The German crew set the plane on fire, and escaped, but were caught. It was their 100th mission. This was the second time that the crew had been shot down - on 10 May 1940, the crew had been shot down by a Fokker D.XXI, and crashed at Vijfhuizen, and one of the crew was killed, being replaced with Ernst Stiller. One of the propellers of the aircraft ended up in the BMARC social club. The crew was Oberleutnant Friedrich-Karl Rinck the pilot aged around 26 from Stralsund, Obergefreiter Ernst Stiller, Oberfeldwebel Wilhelm Rüther from Salzhausen aged around 27, and Unteroffizier Ferdinand Wissing from Rhede aged around 23.

The factory was also attacked in daylight on 3 December 1940, but the plane was damaged by the 3rd Kesteven (Grantham and Spittlegate) Battalion who had an anti-aircraft battery at the factory. 7 people were killed on 4 February 1941.

The 1942 morale-raising film The Foreman Went to France was based on an employee of the Grantham factory. Melbourne Johns, from Pembrokeshire, was working at the Grantham factory and realised in 1940 that the Hispano-Suiza factory in France had important Deep Hole Boring Machines that could be of immense value to the Germans and set out on a mission with a team to recover the equipment. Finding the French factory and local village deserted, they drove the equipment back to England on a lorry. Melbourne Johns died in Grantham in 1955. The Deep Hole Boring Machine (DHBM), used for drilling the barrels of the guns, in the Grantham factory was very valuable, and was encased in a specially-made bomb-proof shelter.

The company, for morale, had an amateur revue group, called the 'Hot Spots'; a production at the town's Theatre Royal on Thursday 15 February 1940 was attended by the actor Leslie Howard; Howard would be shot down on BOAC Flight 777 on 1 June 1943 by eight Junkers Ju 88 aircraft. The 'Hot Spots' group took part in Wings for Victory Week events.

On Friday 6 August 1943 the social club featured Felix Mendelssohn's Hawaiian Serenaders, with the Band of the Royal Air Force Regiment. As part of factory entertainment, Gracie Fields entertained workers at the town's cinema on Tuesday 31 August 1943. Afterwards Gracie visited a local airfield, and stayed the night at Mr Kendall's home - 'Brusa' on Belton Lane.

It also put on events at the Empire Theatre on George Street, and at the Sleaford Corn Exchange. It arranged a Brains Trust panel question evening at the Sleaford Picture drome on Saturday 12 February 1944 at 8pm. and at the State Cinema in Grantham at 3pm on the Sunday. On both panels were Alexander Critchley, John Loverseed, a Battle of Britain pilot, George Reakes, Clement Davies later the Liberal leader until 1956, Edgar Granville, Baron Granville of Eye, John McGovern (politician), and Aneurin Bevan.

By the end of the war, the factory had made 5 million rounds of ammunition, and 100,000 cannon shells. Jim Eade (1905-1983), who worked for Denis Kendall at BMARC, was later the editor of the Grantham Journal from 1945 to 1967.

=== Post-war ===
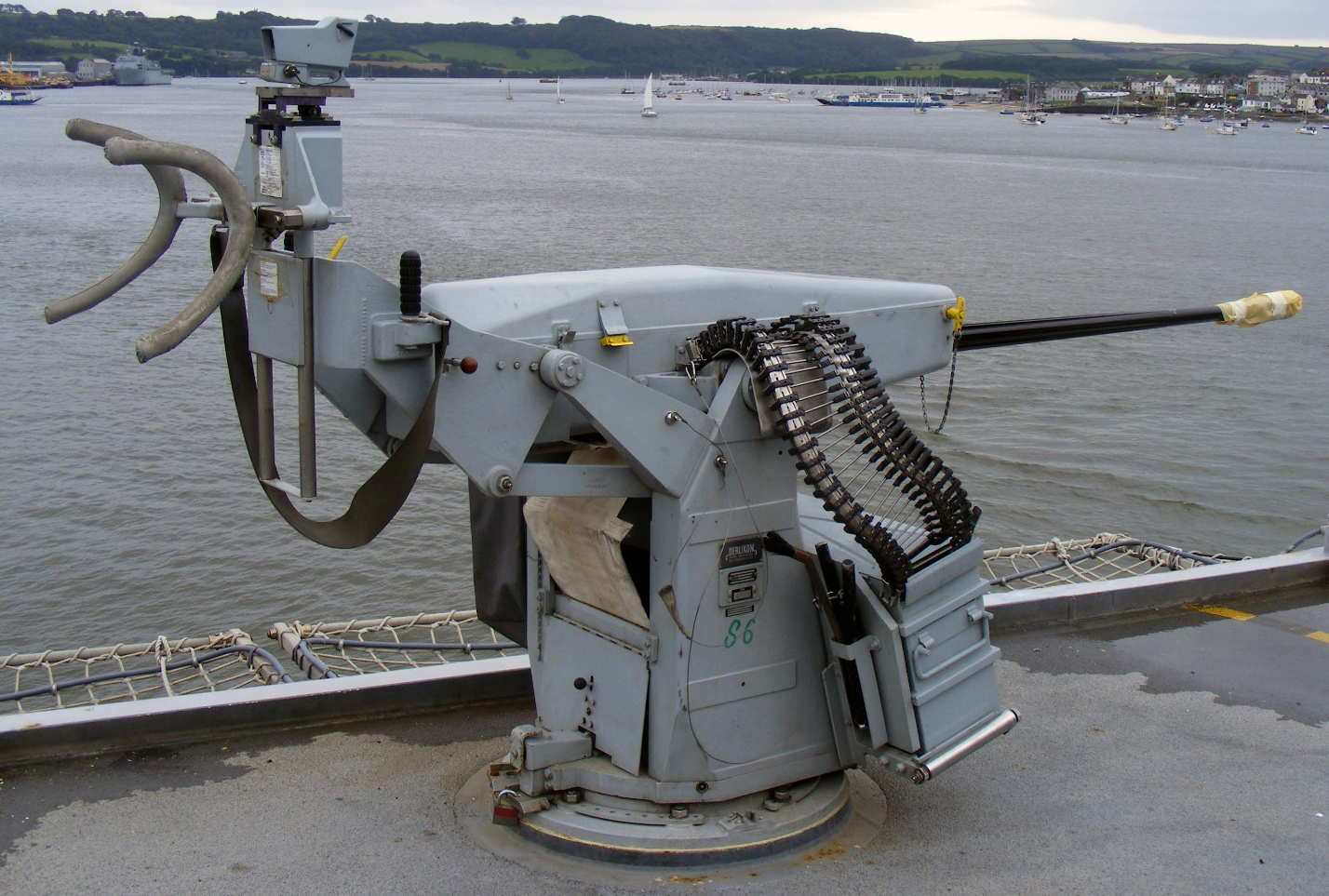
Royal Navy 20 mm cannon

In 1974, the company acquired a 720-acre (2.9 km^{2}) site at Faldingworth, near Market Rasen which had two indoor firing ranges for testing and proving of cannon (Oerlikon 20 mm cannon). The site also had the capability to store nuclear weapons such as Redbeard and WE.177. This site is currently used by BAE Systems. The company also made the Oerlikon 30 mm twin cannon (GCM).

BMARC was a subsidiary of Hispano-Suiza (Suisse), S.A. in Geneva and then was owned from 1970 to 1987 by Oerlikon, the Swiss defence contractor. It was then sold to British Astra Holdings, which had a head office in Kent, in May 1988.

With Contraves of Switzerland (now called Rheinmetall Air Defence) and Plessey, it developed the Seaguard naval anti-missile defence. In 1984 the Royal Navy bought the Dutch Goalkeeper CIWS (made by Signaal, now Thales Nederland) in an agreement whereby the Dutch armed forces would buy, in exchange, the Rolls-Royce Marine Spey engine for their Karel Doorman-class frigates.

In the 1990s, the company was investigated for alleged illegal dealings with Iraq. Jonathan Aitken was a non-executive director of the company from September 1988, and in a libel trial in March 1997, BMARC was accused of selling weapons to Iran. On 11 December 1995, an ITV World in Action programme covered the subject and the Scott Report. It was extensively (and exclusively) investigated by the Guardian newspaper, largely motivated by the potential to discredit (and later convict) Jonathan Aitken.

=== Falklands War ===
The company was awarded The Queen's Award for Enterprise: International Trade (Export) (1981).

In planning the Vulcan raid, Operation Black Buck, the RAF was most interested in the capabilities of the anti-aircraft twin 35-mm Oerlikon GDF. The station commander of RAF Waddington sent the station intelligence officer, Flt Lt Martin Hallam, to speak to Spike Jones, a former senior RAF officer, now at the Grantham factory. The meeting was arranged by the managing director Werner Loyk (Swiss). The RAF were able to find out capabilities of radar, but the RAF were told that it would be unlikely for the Argentines to have transported the bulky Roland (missile) system.

The Argentines had taken the system to the Falklands, and the system would later shoot down a Sea Harrier on 1 June 1982. The Argentines would also shoot down two of their own aircraft with the Oerlikon 35mm.

After the Falklands War, many Royal Navy vessels had BMARC 20mm cannon added, as many of these ships had had woeful protection in that war, against substantial Argentine air attacks.

=== Financial collapse ===
On 4 February 1992, after owing £50 million, Astra went into receivership. In Britain, it also owned the pyrotechnics company Haley & Weller (who made grenades). After the financial collapse of Astra Holdings, in April 1992 BMARC was bought by British Aerospace, briefly becoming part of Royal Ordnance. The company closed the Grantham site later in 1992, and the site was sold in 1994.

=== Visits ===
The site was visited on Tuesday 26 January 1943 by the Minister of Supply, Sir Andrew Duncan. On Sunday 7 September 1941 the Band of the Royal Air Force College gave a concert in the BMARC social hall.

== Royal Navy use ==
Ships using the 20 mm weapons are the Type 22 frigate, the Type 42 destroyer, the Fort Victoria-class replenishment oiler, the Fort Rosalie-class replenishment ship, the River-class patrol vessel, the Castle-class patrol vessel, the Fearless-class landing platform dock, HMS Bristol, and RFA Fort Victoria (A387) and HMS Roebuck.

== Current use of the site ==
The former site's offices are now home to the Springfield Business Park, with the rest of the factory part developed for housing. South Lincolnshire Enterprise Agency was based there.
