= Embassy of Luxembourg, London =

Diplomatic mission of Luxembourg in the United Kingdom

Embassy of Luxembourg in London
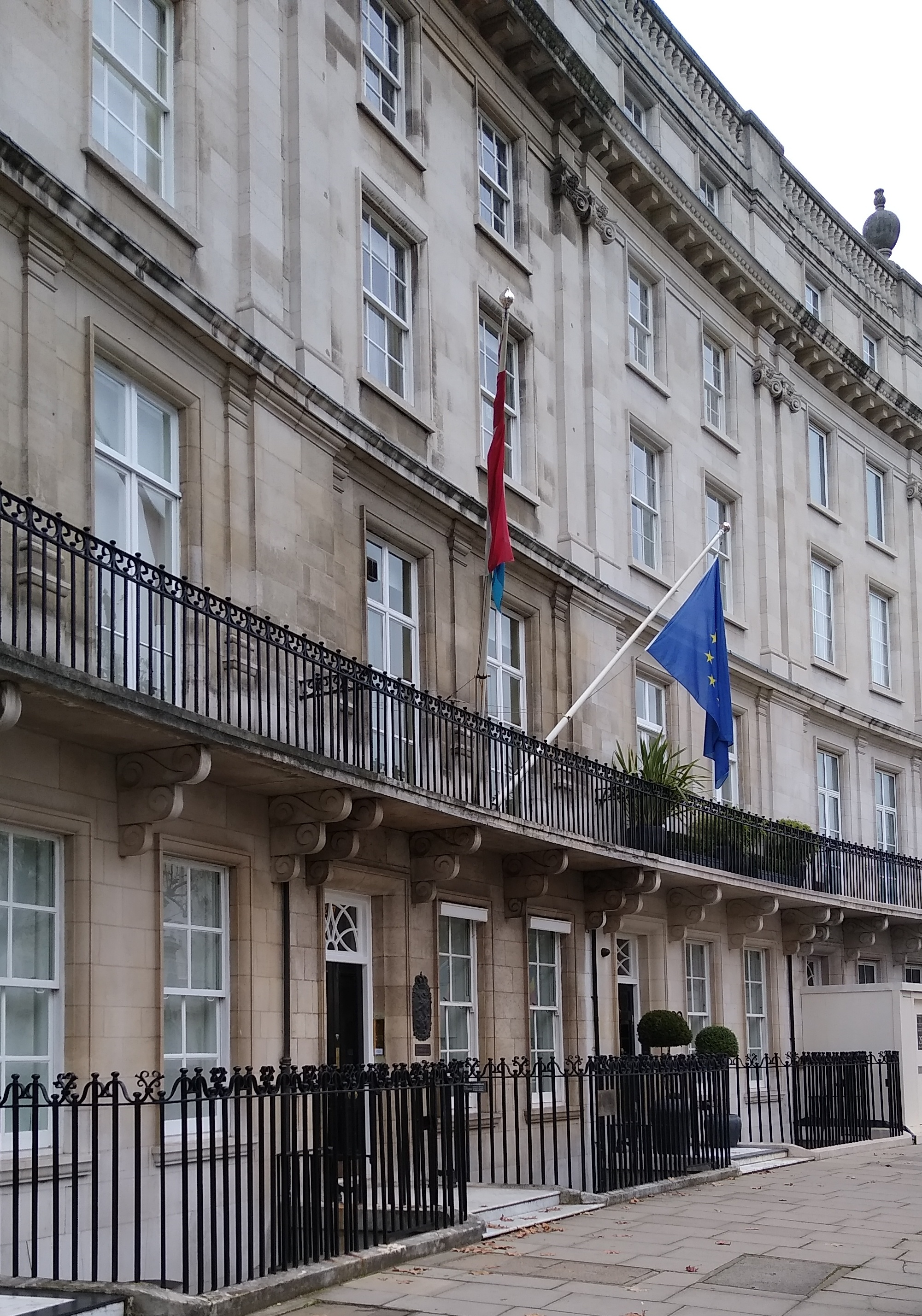
- Location: Belgravia, London
- Address: 27 Wilton Crescent, London, SW1X 8SD
- Coordinates: 51°30′3.2″N 0°9′16.9″W
- Ambassador: Jean Olinger

The Embassy of Luxembourg in London is the diplomatic mission of Luxembourg in the United Kingdom. It was the home of the Luxembourg government-in-exile during the Second World War.

The building forms one of a group of Grade II listed stucco buildings along the eastern side of Wilton Crescent.

== Gallery ==
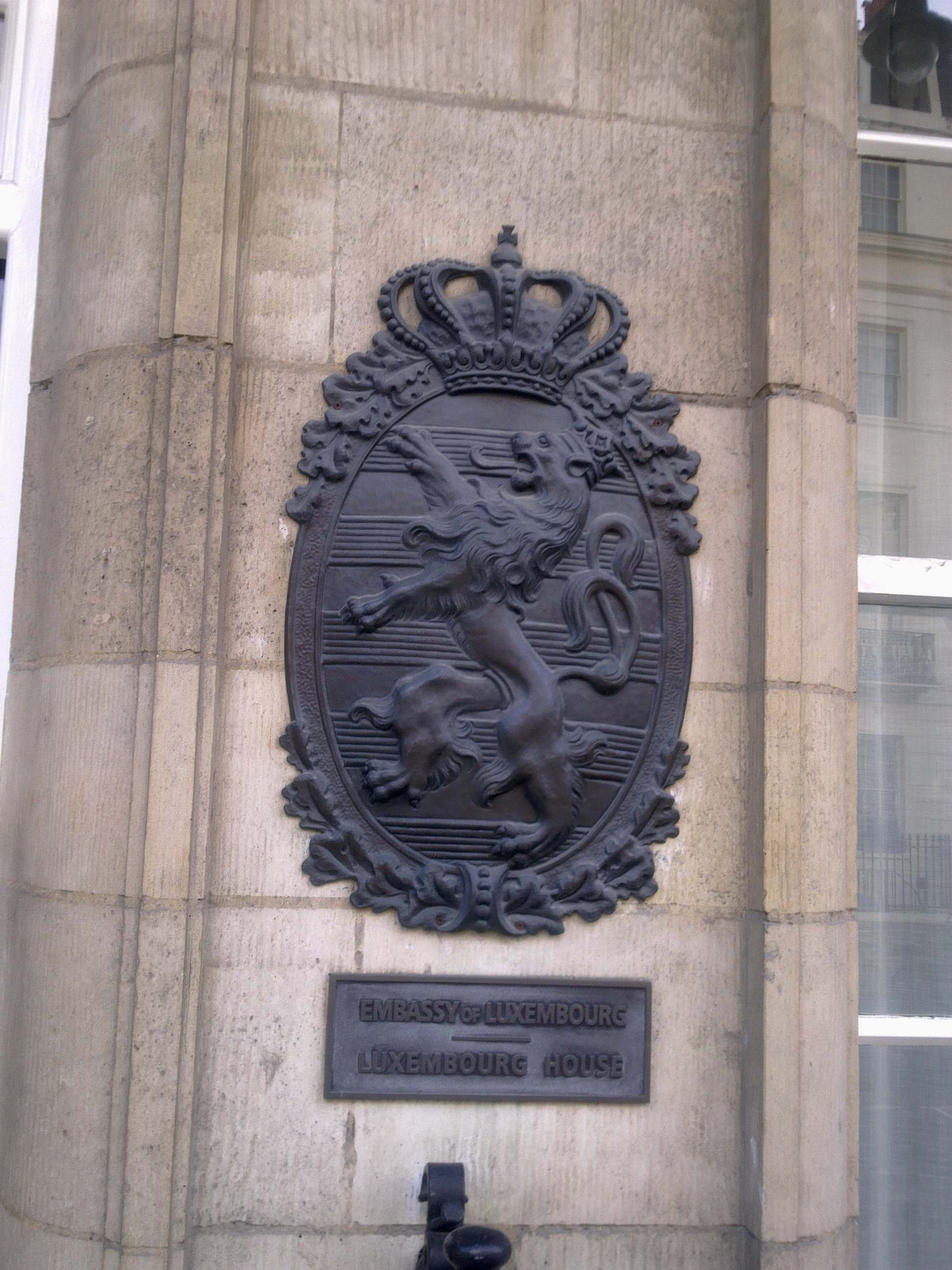
Plaque outside the embassy depicting the Coat of arms of Luxembourg, lesser version

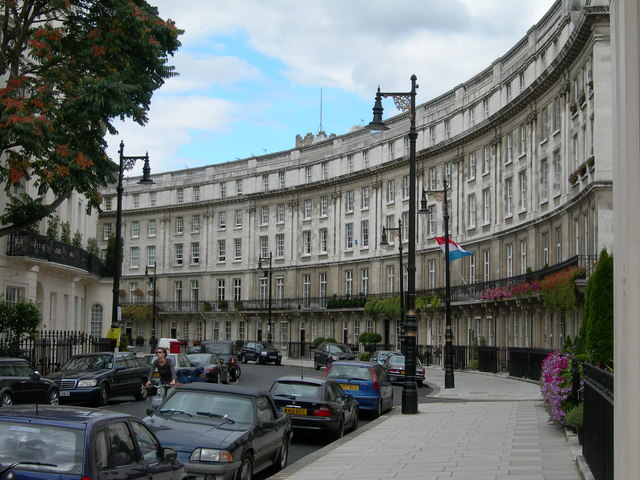
The embassy as seen from Belgrave Square
