= Baron Bruntisfield =

Barony in the Peerage of the United Kingdom

Escutcheon of the Baron Bruntisfield

Baron Bruntisfield, of Boroughmuir in the City of Edinburgh, is a title in the Peerage of the United Kingdom. It was created in 1942 for the Scottish Conservative politician and former Vice-Chamberlain of the Household, Sir Victor Warrender, 8th Baronet. The Warrender family descends from George Warrender. He was Lord Provost of Edinburgh and represented Edinburgh in Parliament. In 1715 he was created a baronet, of Lochend in the County of Haddington, in the Baronetage of Great Britain.

His grandson, the 3rd Baronet, fought at the Battle of Minden in 1759, represented Haddington Burghs in the House of Commons and served as King's Remembrancer of the Court of Exchequer from 1771 to 1791. He was succeeded by his son, the 4th Baronet. He sat as a Member of Parliament for Haddington Burghs, Truro, Sandwich, Westbury and Honiton and notably served as a Lord of the Admiralty from 1812 to 1812. In 1822 Warrender was admitted to the Privy Council. On his death the title passed to his younger brother, the 5th Baronet.

His grandson, the 7th Baronet, was a Vice Admiral in the Royal Navy. He was succeeded by his son, the 8th Baronet, who was raised to the peerage as Baron Bruntisfield, of Boroughmuir in the City of Edinburgh, in 1942. As of 2026 the titles are held by the latter's grandson, the 3rd Baron, who succeeded in 2007. He is a retired officer of the British Army and an investment banker.

== Warrender baronets, of Lochend (1715) ==
Escutcheon of the Warrender baronets of Lochend

- Sir George Warrender, 1st Baronet (c. 1658–1721)
- Sir John Warrender, 2nd Baronet (c. 1686–1772)
- Sir Patrick Warrender, 3rd Baronet (1731–1799)
- Sir George Warrender, 4th Baronet (1782–1849)
- Sir John Warrender, 5th Baronet (1786–1867)
- Sir George Warrender, 6th Baronet (1825–1901)
- Sir George John Scott Warrender, 7th Baronet (1860–1917)
- Sir Victor Alexander George Anthony Warrender, 8th Baronet (1899–1993) (created Baron Bruntisfield in 1942)

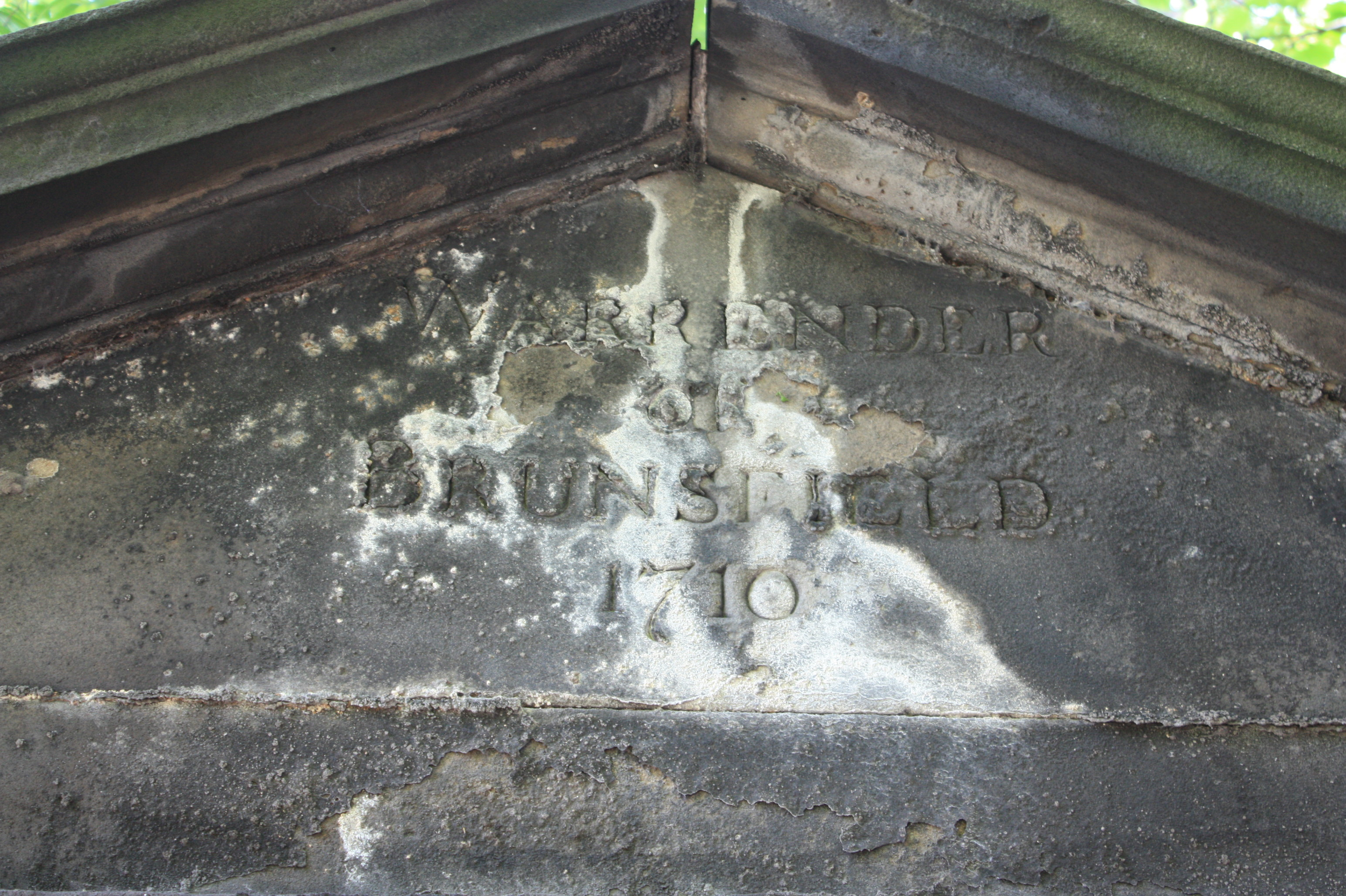
The Warrender burial vault, Greyfriars Kirkyard

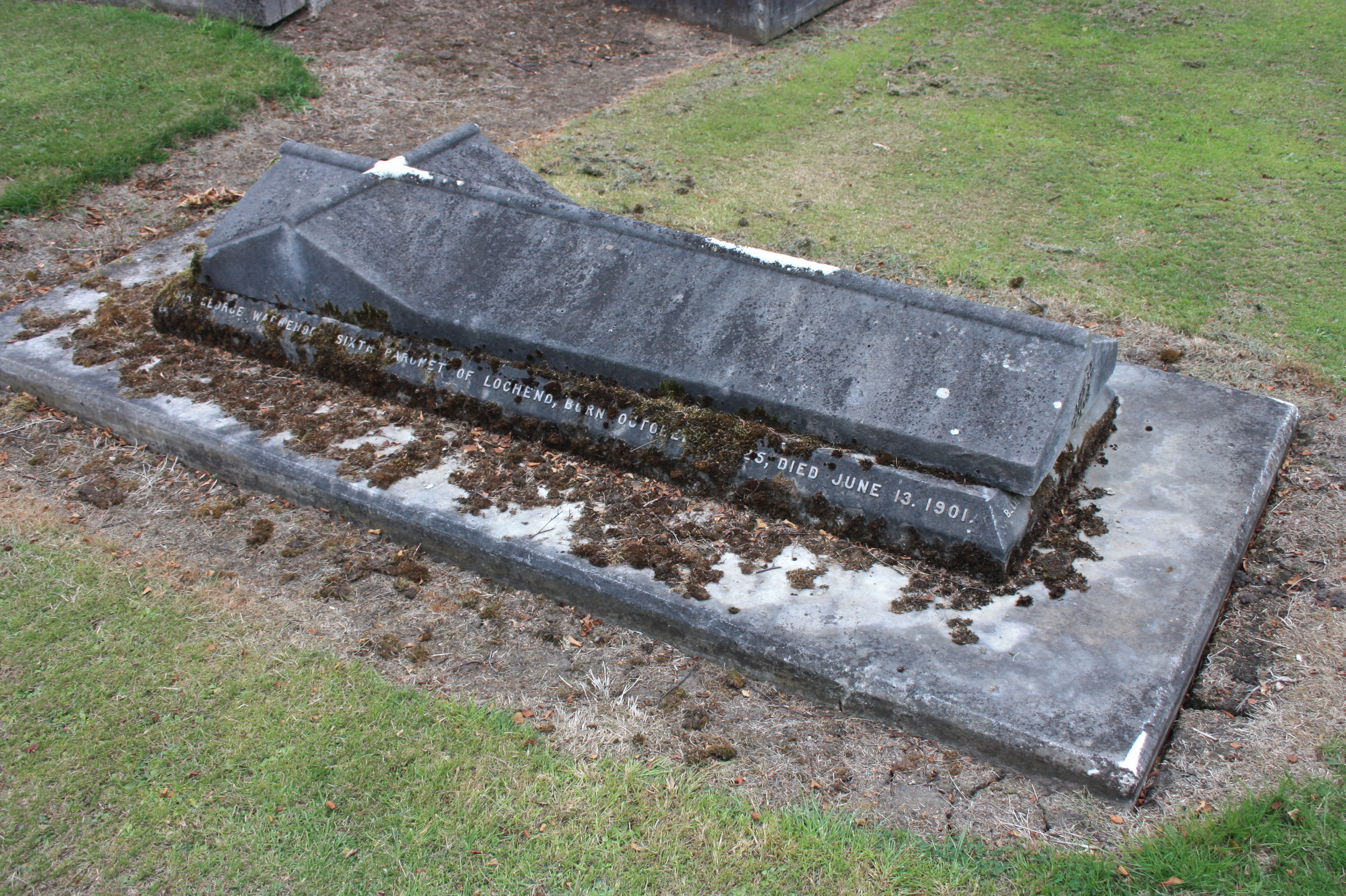
The grave of Sir George Warrender, 6th Baronet, Grange Cemetery

== Barons Bruntisfield (1942) ==
- Victor Alexander George Anthony Warrender, 1st Baron Bruntisfield (1899–1993)
- John Robert Warrender, 2nd Baron Bruntisfield (1921–2007)
- Michael John George Warrender, 3rd Baron Bruntisfield (born 1949)

The heir apparent is the present holder's son John Michael Patrick Caspar Warrender (born 1996).

Baronetage of Great Britain
Preceded by Kneller baronets	Warrender baronets of Lochend; 2 June 1715	Succeeded by Tench baronets
