= France and NATO =

International relations

France–NATO relations
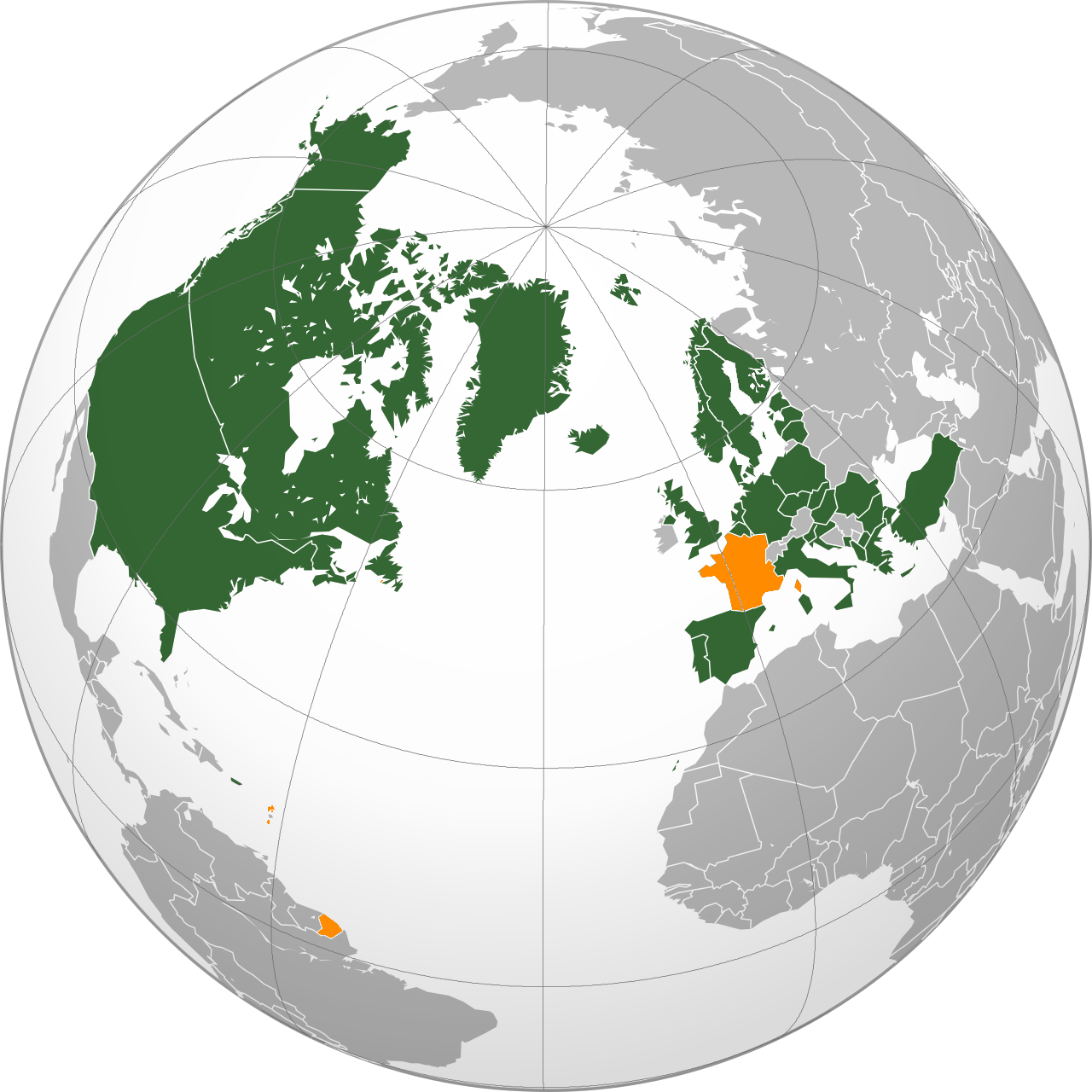
- NATO: France

France is a founding member of NATO and played an active role in its establishment. Since NATO's creation in 1949, France has consistently maintained its membership in both political and military spheres. However, it has frequently criticized NATO's operational methods, particularly the dominant role of the United States within the alliance.

Under the presidency of Charles de Gaulle, France pursued diplomatic independence and promoted a vision of European collective security that conflicted with American leadership in NATO, especially regarding the integration of member states' armed forces under a US-led unified command and the control of NATO’s nuclear arsenal. In 1966, under De Gaulle’s leadership, France withdrew from NATO’s integrated military command. Nevertheless, cooperation agreements between French and NATO forces were quickly signed, reducing the practical impact of this withdrawal. This cooperation was reinforced under Presidents François Mitterrand and Jacques Chirac, and in 2009, President Nicolas Sarkozy reinstated France into NATO’s unified command.

Throughout the Cold War, NATO helped define the political stance of the Western world toward the Soviet Union and the Warsaw Pact. Militarily, it set the standards for member countries’ capabilities and doctrines. During major crises, such as those involving Berlin or Cuba, and later regarding the Euromissile Crisis or in response to the terrorist attacks of September 11, France demonstrated solidarity with its Atlantic allies. However, French foreign policy often led to disagreements with the United States, even when this meant diverging from other European Union member states with which France was advancing European integration.

Since the 1990s, such disagreements have become less frequent, and France has re-emerged as a significant contributor to NATO’s political and military activities.

== Founding of NATO (1948–1950) ==
At the end of the Second World War, France was unable to ensure its security independently. Its priorities were focused on supply, reconstruction, and maintaining control over its extensive overseas empire, in the occupation zone in Germany, and its metropolitan territory. The French armed forces were poorly equipped and struggled to operate across such vast areas. The United Nations (UN), founded in 1945 to promote global collective security, quickly revealed structural limitations. In practice, decision-making power was concentrated in the hands of the five permanent members of United Nations Security Council, each of whom, at the insistence of Joseph Stalin, had a right of veto on resolutions. France became one of these five permanent members, largely due to the insistence of Charles de Gaulle. However, early votes demonstrated that the UN would not be able to guarantee European security, particularly as tensions grew between the Soviet Union and Western powers. While the UN Charter provided for the creation of international armed forces under its authority, such a force seemed unlikely to materialize. Consequently, France began to explore other multilateral security arrangements on regional or bilateral levels, as permitted by the UN Charter. (Note: Article 51 of the Charter recognises the "inherent right of individual or collective self-defence if an armed attack occurs against a Member of the United Nations" and Article 52 states that "nothing in the present Charter precludes the existence of regional arrangements or agencies for dealing with matters relating to the maintenance of international peace and security". These articles are largely the result of France's insistence on allowing these regional agreements.)

Until 1947, the primary focus of French diplomacy remained the prevention of a military resurgence in Germany. (Note: The Franco-Soviet Treaty of 1944 and the Franco-English Treaty of Dunkirk, signed in March 1947, followed the same logic.) When it became apparent that the Soviet Union posed a more immediate threat to European stability, France actively engaged—often taking the initiative—in the formation of political and military alliances designed to guarantee its security. However, agreement on strategy was not easily achieved, either domestically in France or among the French, British, and American governments.

France sought to continue the policy of dismembering Germany, as outlined in the Yalta and Potsdam agreements. In contrast, by 1949–1950, the United States and the United Kingdom had come to see the reintegration of West Germany as necessary, both for economic and humanitarian reasons and for the defense of Western Europe. Although there was broad consensus on the importance of American aid, French policy remained divided between a European-focused vision of security and an Atlantic-oriented approach. This strategic ambiguity remained a key issue in French diplomacy throughout the Cold War.

While the European idea gained significant momentum in the immediate post-war years, major questions persisted. In France, as in other countries, there were deep divisions over the appropriate model for European cooperation—ranging from simple intergovernmental collaboration to the creation of supranational institutions, potentially involving partial transfers of sovereignty, and drawing on either federalist principles or consensus-based decision-making among partner states.

The fifth meeting of the Council of Foreign Ministers (CFM) of the four wartime Allies ended in London on December 16, 1947, in failure. A definitive break occurred between Soviet Foreign Minister Vyacheslav Molotov and the three Western ministers. In the days that followed, British Foreign Secretary Ernest Bevin, French Foreign Minister Georges Bidault, and U.S. Secretary of State George Marshall held bilateral consultations to determine the implications of this failure, particularly regarding European security. From late 1947, discussions progressed on two parallel tracks: one between France and the United Kingdom on forming a European alliance, and another, conducted secretly among the three Western powers, on establishing an Atlantic military alliance to protect Western Europe.

=== The Treaty of Brussels, a preliminary step ===
With the support of the United States, the United Kingdom—joined by France—proposed on January 22, 1948, that the Benelux countries form a regional political and military alliance. These negotiations resulted in the signing of the Brussels Treaty on March 17, 1948, which established the Western Union. Although concerns about a potential threat from Germany were still present during the discussions, the treaty was ultimately concluded with a clear defensive intent toward the Soviet Union, particularly following the February 1948 communist coup in of Czechoslovakia, which heightened East–West tensions.

The United States was kept informed throughout the negotiations, both through official channels and more discreetly via frequent direct contacts between American and British officials, from which the French were largely excluded. These exchanges extended beyond European security to broader questions concerning the future structure and orientation of Europe. The limited outcomes of these discussions prompted France, beginning in the early 1950s, to increasingly orient itself toward West Germany, whose political and economic revival had become an established reality that France had to acknowledge. In this context, the Treaty of Brussels functioned less as a foundation for a European defense system and more as a diplomatic means to facilitate broader acceptance of a fully operational Atlantic alliance.

=== France in the founding of NATO ===
==== Negotiating the North Atlantic Treaty ====
Following the failure of the Council of Foreign Ministers (CFM) in London in December 1947, the United States, France, and the United Kingdom secretly agreed on the principle of a Western alliance that would associate the United States with the defense of Western Europe. However, at that stage, no concrete arrangements were outlined. The United States remained undecided on the nature of its involvement—whether it should be limited to material assistance or extend to the stationing of American troops in Europe. France actively advocated for a more concrete commitment. On March 4, 1948, French Foreign Minister Georges Bidault sent a note to U.S. Secretary of State George Marshall, emphasizing the seriousness of the European situation and the need to define specific measures to ensure the security of France and its neighbors. Marshall agreed on the urgency of the situation but made American involvement conditional on the prior signing of the Brussels Treaty.

Subsequently, secret negotiations were conducted between the United States, the United Kingdom, and Canada, excluding France. The official justification given later was concern over communist infiltration within the French administration. In addition, the American administration reportedly still viewed France with skepticism, perceiving it through the lens of its 1940 defeat. While the U.S. executive branch recognized the necessity of direct American involvement in European security, domestic public opinion and existing legislation limited such commitments. The passage of the Vandenberg Resolution on June 11, 1948, which authorized peacetime alliances outside the American continent, removed this legal obstacle. The Berlin Blockade, launched by the Soviet Union in June 1948, further galvanized support and opened the path to formal negotiations beginning in July 1948 between the United States and the five Brussels Treaty signatories.

France sought strong U.S. guarantees in the event of Soviet aggression. It was unsuccessful in achieving an automatic commitment to armed intervention. Instead, Article 5 of the treaty states that each party "shall assist the Party or Parties so attacked by taking forthwith, individually and in concert with the other Parties, such action as it deems necessary, including the use of armed force." However, France did secure the inclusion of its Algerian departments under the treaty’s protection. Additionally, Italy joined NATO in exchange for the accession of the Nordic countries, as favored by the United States. The North Atlantic Treaty was signed on April 4, 1949. The U.S. Senate ratified it on July 21, 1949, by a vote of 82 to 13. The National Assembly followed on July 26, and the treaty entered into force on August 24, 1949.

==== Early NATO organization ====
The North Atlantic Treaty initially established only one governing body: the North Atlantic Council, tasked with determining the subsidiary structures necessary for the functioning of the alliance. Intense negotiations followed, particularly regarding the creation of a restricted strategic committee composed of the United States, the United Kingdom, and France. France strongly supported this proposal, viewing it as a crucial opportunity to exert influence over NATO’s strategic direction, which it otherwise feared would be dominated by the Anglo-American powers. France achieved partial success with the creation of the "Permanent Group," a body responsible for preparing military plans for the Military Committee—composed of the chiefs of staff—and the Defense Committee at the ministerial level. The structure of NATO’s governance at these three levels was ratified at the Council’s first meeting on September 17, 1949.

As NATO's activities expanded and various committees were established, the need for a permanent civilian structure became evident. In May 1950, the Council created the Council of Deputies, composed of Deputy Foreign Ministers, with each member country appointing a permanent representative. France was represented by Hervé Alphand.

==== First definition of NATO strategy ====
NATO’s military authorities began defining the alliance’s strategic doctrine immediately after its formation. For France, a primary objective was to secure American support for a forward defense strategy, aimed at defending continental Europe directly in the event of a Soviet attack. France sought to avoid the adoption of a peripheral defense strategy, which would prioritize defense at the edges of Europe rather than on the continent itself. However, both the British—particularly Field Marshal Montgomery—and the Americans tended to favor a peripheral strategy. This preference was largely influenced by the overwhelming numerical superiority of Soviet land forces. The first NATO Strategic Concept, approved in early 1950, ultimately represented a compromise. It provided for "stopping and, as soon as possible, repelling enemy offensives," though it did not specify the conditions, terms, or means for doing so. It also called for the rapid initiation of strategic bombing operations, "involving the use of all devices without exception"—a formulation understood to include nuclear weapons.

=== Requesting aid and American military presence ===
==== American military aid to France ====
The ratification of the North Atlantic Treaty by the French National Assembly was accompanied by a resolution urging the government to use all its influence to obtain from the United States the essential armaments needed to enable the French armed forces to effectively fulfill the defense obligations arising from the treaty. On April 5, 1949, the five signatories of the Brussels Treaty formally requested military assistance from the United States. The U.S. executive responded favorably and began the process of securing funding from Congress. On October 6, 1949, President Harry S. Truman signed the Mutual Defense Military Assistance Program Act into law. A bilateral agreement between France and the United States was concluded on January 27, 1950, along with similar agreements with seven other European countries. On March 8, 1950, the French aircraft carrier Dixmude delivered the first shipment of American aircraft to French Naval Aviation. The negotiations surrounding this aid were complex. In exchange for assistance, the United States requested logistical facilities on French territory, raising concerns in France about issues of national sovereignty. These concerns were heightened by France’s ongoing involvement in the First Indochina War, which was consuming a significant portion of its military resources and limiting its ability to commit forces to the European theater.

==== Korean War and military integration ====
On June 25, 1950, the North Korean army launched a large-scale invasion of South Korea, initiating a conflict that would last three years and prompt a significant military commitment by the United States—not only in Korea but also in Europe, where Western governments grew increasingly concerned about the possibility of a Soviet offensive.

American forces in Europe (1950–1955)
Year	Workforce
1950	120,497
1951	250 601
1952	250 601
1953	380 705
1954	397,029
1955	413 169

In response to this shifting geopolitical context, France submitted two memoranda to the U.S. government, the first on August 5 and the second on August 17, 1950. These documents emphasized France’s military efforts and the corresponding need for increased aid. They also requested the stationing of additional American and British troops on the European continent and proposed the reorganization of NATO to include unified command and defense planning. A tripartite meeting of the American, British, and French foreign ministers, held on September 12, 1950, provided U.S. Secretary of State Dean Acheson with the opportunity to outline the American position. His proposals largely aligned with French expectations—except on one critical issue: the incorporation of German soldiers into Western defense forces, to which France was firmly opposed.

The urgency of the Korean War and fears that it might precede a Soviet attack in Europe led to swift decisions. On September 26, 1950, the North Atlantic Council agreed to create a unified military force for the defense of Western Europe under NATO authority. This force would operate under a Supreme Commander—who, it was understood, would be an American. The question of West German participation was deferred, with the Defense Committee tasked to study the matter further. Though diplomatically isolated on the issue, France secured time to prepare counter-proposals, which would eventually take the form of a European army initiative—the Treaty of Paris. At its December 1950 meeting, the Council appointed General Dwight Eisenhower as the first Supreme Commander of NATO forces in Europe. The military structure of the Brussels Treaty was merged into NATO’s framework. Eisenhower established his headquarters in Rocquencourt, France, at a site soon known as SHAPE (Supreme Headquarters Allied Powers Europe). The command structure he implemented ensured notable French participation: of 21 general officers in the high command, five were French, and 25 of 242 staff positions at SHAPE were allocated to French officers.

== Mutual doubts and disappointments (1951–1958) ==
France played a leading role in the creation of NATO, in its development into a permanent and integrated military organization, and in the establishment of the American security guarantee through a strong presence of U.S. troops in Europe. However, beginning in the early 1950s, the frequent crises faced by successive governments of the Fourth Republic created tensions between France and the United States regarding NATO’s functioning, strategy, and resources.

=== German rearmament and the Treaty of Paris crisis ===
The issue of German rearmament remained highly sensitive for France. Three approaches were considered for Germany’s future: neutralization, Atlanticization, or Europeanization. The first, supported by the political left and accompanied by Europe-wide security guarantees, was advocated by Moscow during the conferences of the four former Allies. However, the failure of the 1954 Berlin Conference demonstrated that this option was unattainable. The Atlantic solution, proposed by the United States and gradually accepted by all NATO members, raised concerns in France about a potential loss of influence within NATO and reduced control over the scale of German rearmament. The European solution represented a compromise, appealing to those who still opposed any form of German rearmament while gaining support across much of the French political spectrum.

==== France's failed proposal for a European army ====
Promoted in June 1950 by Jean Monnet, in line with the Schuman plan that had led to the European Coal and Steel Community (ECSC), the proposal was presented to the National Assembly on 24 October 1950 by Prime Minister René Pleven. It called for the creation of a European Defense Community (EDC) with supranational structures and the participation of West Germany (Federal Republic of Germany). Initially perceived by the United States as a delaying tactic, the proposal was eventually endorsed at the Atlantic Council meetings in December. The Treaty of Paris negotiations began in Paris on 15 February 1951. The continental European members of the Brussels and North Atlantic treaties signed the treaty on 27 May 1952. However, the relationship between the Treaty of Paris and NATO remained unresolved. Political divisions in France persisted, while the government sought increased aid from its allies, particularly the United States—amid the ongoing Indochina war—while aiming to limit West Germany’s role in European defense. Although the United States strongly supported the treaty and pressed for its ratification, the French National Assembly rejected it on 30 August 1954, after two more years of internal and external negotiations.

==== Accepting Germany's entry into NATO ====
France ultimately accepted the entry of the Federal Republic of Germany (FRG) into the Atlantic Alliance in exchange for commitments from the United Kingdom and the United States to maintain their forces assigned to NATO. The extension of the Brussels Treaty to include Germany and Italy led to the creation of the Western European Union (WEU), which remained largely inactive in practice for several decades. Beginning in 1984, however, and largely at France’s initiative, the WEU became a platform supporting the development of a European defense policy that, while not integrated, was coordinated with NATO. On 22 October 1954, the North Atlantic Council approved the protocol of accession of the FRG, and the occupation status was formally ended through the Bonn–Paris conventions. Marking a symbolic shift in France’s relationship with NATO, Hervé Alphand was replaced on the same date as France’s permanent representative to the NATO Council by Maurice Couve de Murville, who would later serve as Minister of Foreign Affairs under President General de Gaulle. Ratification of these agreements by the French parliament was achieved with difficulty, bringing to a close four years of political and diplomatic crisis in December 1954.

=== NATO reorganization, 1951–1952 ===
By the early 1950s, NATO was widely viewed as ineffective, and a comprehensive reorganization was considered necessary. The process began at the North Atlantic Council meeting in Ottawa in September 1951 and culminated in the adoption of a new organizational structure at the Lisbon Council meeting in February 1952. Jean Monnet represented France on the Temporary Committee tasked with drafting reform proposals, chaired by the American Averell Harriman. Consensus was reached on the need to establish permanent civil structures concentrated in a single location, and to provide NATO with its own budget and legal personality. France and the United Kingdom advocated for the appointment of a strong Director General to lead the civil organizations and chair the Council. However, the United States prevailed in establishing a separate position of Secretary General responsible for NATO's civilian functions, while the presidency of the Council remained distinct. France was nonetheless satisfied with the selection of Paris, rather than London, as NATO's headquarters—a decision supported by U.S. General Dwight D. Eisenhower. The reorganization did not grant NATO any supranational authority. The North Atlantic Council remained the sole decision-making body, with decisions made unanimously. The Council meets at the level of permanent representatives (with ambassadorial rank), ministers of defense and foreign affairs, and heads of state or government. Meetings at the highest level are designated NATO summits.

=== Dependence on the United States, US Go Home ===
Map of NATO air bases in France before the withdrawal of the integrated military command in 1966.

American military aid to France under the NATO framework steadily increased during the early 1950s. Originating during the Second World War, this aid reached its peak between 1953 and 1954. While engaged in the Korean War, the United States also provided substantial support to France in the Indochina War, including significant deliveries of equipment and ammunition.

By the mid-1950s, France's standing among its allies had deteriorated. France was often perceived as lacking a consistent and coherent foreign policy and approach to NATO, marked by frequent governmental instability and repeated requests for increased U.S. assistance without corresponding commitments. On the French side, there was growing resentment toward the United States, which was seen as imposing its views on major decisions affecting French security interests, often without a strong sense of partnership. Frustrations were compounded by perceived American interference in French domestic affairs, particularly in economic matters, and by what was seen as a delayed and insufficient U.S. response in Vietnam, culminating in the defeat in the Battle of Diên Biên Phu in the spring of 1954.

Anti-American sentiment reached a peak in the summer of 1954, with Franco-American relations at their lowest point. Throughout the 1950s and 1960s, tens of thousands of American troops—alongside smaller numbers of British and Canadian personnel—were stationed at approximately twenty NATO bases in France. Their presence was often poorly received by segments of the French population, who viewed them as a quasi-occupational force due to their higher standard of living and visible presence. The French Communist Party (PCF), which continued to perform strongly in elections, played a significant role in promoting anti-American sentiment, popularizing slogans such as “US Go Home". In 1958, filmmaker Henry Bonnière directed At Your Service, a documentary commissioned by the United States Information Agency, intended to promote peaceful coexistence between NATO military personnel and French civilians.

American military personnel in France under NATO
1950	1951	1952	1953	1954	1955	1956	1957	1958	1959	1960	1961	1962	1963	1964	1965	1966	1967
802	22,876	22,876	44,950	47,187	55,270	59,615	71,531	50,417	43,933	40,059	40,045	53,074	41,331	33,503	31,049	22,333	1,491

=== American hegemony and the Suez crisis ===
The years 1953 and 1954 marked a significant turning point in France’s relationship with NATO. In the Soviet Union, the death of Joseph Stalin and the emergence of a new collective leadership signaled a desire for peaceful coexistence. In contrast, the United States, under President Dwight D. Eisenhower, maintained a strongly anti-communist stance and adopted a military strategy centered on nuclear deterrence and massive retaliation, aimed in part at reducing military expenditures. France viewed this shift with concern, fearing that it would miss an opportunity for détente in Europe and abandon the conventional defense of the European continent, increasing the risk of its destruction in a nuclear conflict. French military officials were kept largely uninformed about U.S. nuclear planning by American officers at SHAPE, amid fears of communist infiltration during the McCarthy era and a series of espionage scandals.

Beginning in 1954, Algeria became the primary focus of French national security concerns. As Algeria was administratively part of metropolitan France, it was technically within NATO’s geographical area of responsibility. However, NATO’s jurisdiction applied only to external aggression. France attempted, unsuccessfully, to persuade its allies that Algeria—like Indochina—was a critical front in the fight against communism. The United States, strongly opposed to colonialism, was unwilling to support French efforts in Algeria, fearing damage to its relations with Middle Eastern and Third World countries. France redeployed troops from its NATO commitments to Algeria, prompting discontent among Allied military leadership.

The Suez Crisis in 1956 further exposed divisions within NATO, particularly between the United States and its European allies. The United States demanded an immediate cessation of the Franco-British military intervention, which had been launched without prior American consultation. Washington used both the United Nations and NATO to exert pressure. Facing U.S. opposition and Soviet threats, France concluded that it needed to assert greater independence and accelerate its nuclear weapons program.

By 1957, NATO’s increasingly nuclear-oriented strategy—driven largely by the United States—became more tangible and more concerning for France. The successful Soviet launch of Sputnik gave credibility to Soviet nuclear capabilities. The United Kingdom chose to align its nuclear development more closely with the United States, while the U.S. declined to provide France with nuclear assistance. Instead, it proposed deploying tactical nuclear weapons in France under American control. The French government hesitated, and no decision had been reached by the time Charles de Gaulle returned to power in May 1958. These developments also caused significant concern in West Germany, contributing to a Franco-German rapprochement and the signing of secret nuclear cooperation agreements, which were later extended to Italy.

== France and NATO until the end of the Cold War (1958–1989) ==
=== De Gaulle: NATO without integration (1958–1969) ===
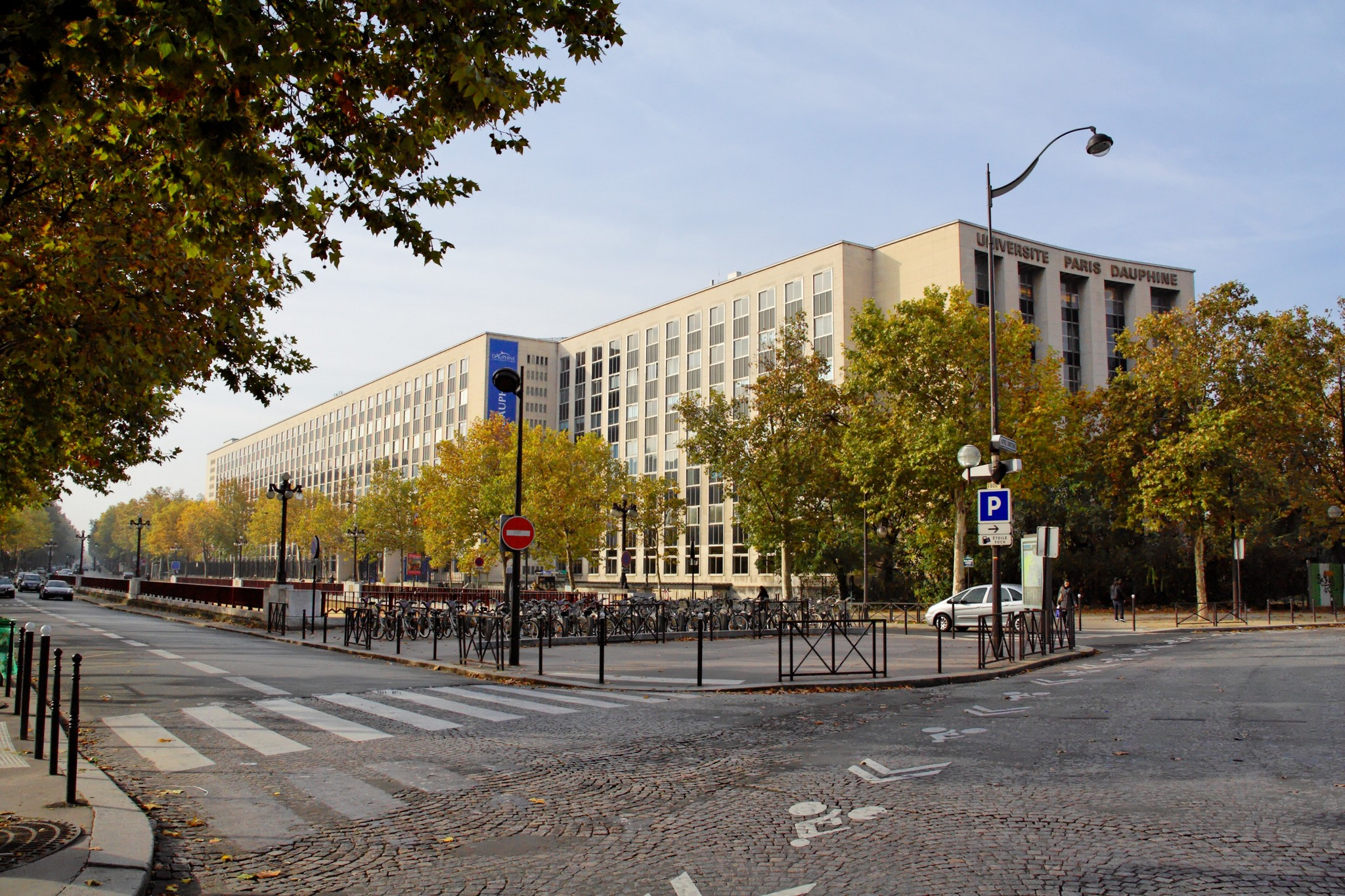
Former NATO headquarters in Paris (inaugurated in 1959 and used by NATO until 1967).

The points of contention between France and the United States regarding NATO during Charles de Gaulle’s presidency were largely continuations of earlier disputes. However, under de Gaulle, France increasingly asserted its autonomy and was able to translate its NATO policy into clear positions and concrete actions. French policy toward NATO during this period followed two main phases: initially, efforts were made to secure a greater role for France in NATO’s leadership structure; when these efforts failed to produce satisfactory results, France shifted toward regaining full national decision-making authority in matters of defense and security, while remaining within the Atlantic Alliance. Upon returning to power in 1958, de Gaulle promptly launched a program to develop an independent French nuclear deterrent, aimed at achieving strategic autonomy. France conducted its first nuclear test in February 1960 at Reggane, in Algeria.

==== France's place in NATO leadership ====
Upon returning to power in 1958, President Charles de Gaulle immediately set a clear course regarding France’s position within NATO. He stated that "our place in the NATO organization must be reconsidered. The Americans have an overwhelming preponderance in the organization of commands. We are completely kept away from the plans drawn up by the SAC (...). SACEUR has resources whose use is completely beyond our decision". (Note: These words were spoken on 17 June 1958 at a meeting of France's main civil and military leaders responsible for foreign and defence policy.) Central to de Gaulle’s concerns was the issue of nuclear weapons. His remarks came in the context of a proposal made by President Eisenhower at the December 1957 NATO summit to deploy nuclear weapons and intermediate-range ballistic missiles (IRBMs) in Europe. De Gaulle refused to accept such a deployment unless France was granted equal decision-making authority with the United States and the United Kingdom on nuclear matters within NATO. The United States hoped that by proposing the stationing of nuclear weapons on French territory, France would agree to place its nuclear program under NATO control and abandon its pursuit of an independent deterrent. De Gaulle, however, saw NATO’s regional framework—from the North Atlantic to Western Europe—as inadequate to meet France’s global security concerns. He believed that threats needed to be assessed and addressed on a global scale. The crises of summer 1958 in the Middle East and Far East further reinforced his view that NATO, as structured by the Treaty of Paris, no longer suited France's strategic needs.

Following three months of diplomatic exchanges and internal deliberation, de Gaulle took a decisive step. On 17 September 1958, he sent a confidential memorandum to U.S. President Eisenhower and British Prime Minister Harold Macmillan. In it, he proposed the establishment of a tripartite NATO directorate that would place France on an equal footing with its principal allies. The memorandum began with a strategic diagnosis: “The Atlantic alliance was designed and its implementation is prepared with a view to a possible zone of action [the North Atlantic] which no longer responds to political and strategic realities. (...) The radius of action of ships and planes and the range of missiles make such a narrow system militarily obsolete. (...) It was initially assumed that atomic weapons (...) would remain a monopoly of the United States, which seemed to justify the delegation of global defense decisions to Washington. (...) This is no longer the case.” The proposal concluded with a call for “an organization of which France is a direct part,” tasked with making joint decisions on global security and implementing strategic action plans, particularly regarding nuclear weapons".

The proposal was met with strong resistance from other NATO members, who viewed it as an initiative that excluded them from critical discussions. Most insisted that any reforms to NATO must be discussed within the existing framework of the North Atlantic Council, which includes all member states. The official response from President Eisenhower, received on 20 October 1958, was a polite but firm rejection—an outcome de Gaulle had anticipated. Realistically, de Gaulle knew he could not yet pursue a complete break with NATO. France had not yet resolved the Algerian War and did not yet possess operational nuclear weapons. In the meantime, he sought to use international tensions to foster limited forms of tripartite cooperation and to test the willingness of his allies to share strategic responsibility.

In 1963, de Gaulle explained the objective of his 1958 memorandum to Alain Peyrefitte: “This memorandum was only a process of diplomatic pressure. I was then looking for a way to get out of NATO and regain my freedom, which the Fourth Republic had alienated. So I asked for the moon”.

The next four years were marked by a series of crises, the most significant for European NATO members being the Berlin Crisis. In that case, France played a key role in Western coordination, but de Gaulle attributed this cooperation more to the commitments arising from post-World War II agreements than to NATO itself. Despite this collaboration, substantial disagreements emerged throughout the crisis. On other issues, de Gaulle increasingly felt that Western solidarity was limited and that the United States paid little regard to French interests. Washington remained firmly opposed to de Gaulle’s concept of tripartism, viewing it as a threat to NATO’s cohesion and unity. To demonstrate France’s resolve, de Gaulle began gradually withdrawing French forces from NATO’s integrated military command. On 11 March 1959, he removed the Mediterranean Fleet from NATO command, followed in 1962 by the withdrawal of the Atlantic and Channel fleets.

==== Independence of French policy ====
===== Nuclear weapons =====
The nuclear issue was central to Charles de Gaulle’s vision of France’s status in the world and its sovereign independence. The United States was unwilling to engage in substantive discussions on NATO's nuclear strategy, and American assistance to France’s nuclear program failed to materialize—due both to political reluctance and legal constraints. (Note: The McMahon Act.) Despite these differences, de Gaulle and President Eisenhower maintained cordial and respectful relations in 1959 and 1960, meeting on several occasions and exchanging numerous letters. While de Gaulle consistently expressed his disagreements over NATO’s functioning, he also reaffirmed France’s commitment to the Western alliance. In a letter dated 25 May 1959, de Gaulle wrote: “I have never been more convinced that, in the present situation, NATO of free States is absolutely necessary. (...) In view of Soviet ambitions and forces, and anticipating what the power and imperialism of the enormous totalitarian China could become, (...) France undoubtedly belongs to the camp of freedom. [By] adopting, on its behalf, measures that are not ‘integrated’ into NATO, France in no way intends to alter our alliance". Nevertheless, de Gaulle persistently returned to the question of nuclear decision-making authority. In his letter of 6 October 1959, he again requested that the United States agree that any decision to initiate nuclear war anywhere in the world should be made jointly by the United States, the United Kingdom, and France.

Regarding the tactical nuclear weapons that Eisenhower had proposed to station in France, de Gaulle rejected the plan on the grounds that they would remain under exclusive American control, without a jointly agreed employment strategy. He confirmed his refusal in a letter dated 25 May 1959. In response, during the second half of 1959, SACEUR relocated approximately 200 U.S. F-100 fighter-bombers based in Toul, Étain, and Chaumont to bases in the United Kingdom and the Federal Republic of Germany. This marked a significant gesture by de Gaulle, underscoring both his insistence on shared control over NATO’s nuclear weapons and his skepticism toward NATO’s evolving nuclear strategy, which he feared would turn European territory into a potential nuclear battlefield while making American strategic guarantees less credible.

Despite his position on nuclear weapons, de Gaulle adopted a more pragmatic approach concerning the French Forces in Germany (FFA), which remained under NATO command. In September 1960, an agreement was signed allowing the deployment of Honest-John and Nike tactical missiles equipped with nuclear warheads, which remained under American control until a decision on use was made. A similar agreement was concluded in 1963 for aircraft of the 1st Tactical Air Command (1er CATAC) operating in West Germany. Committed to maintaining operational cooperation with NATO allies, French Defense Minister Pierre Messmer initiated the creation of the Tiger Squadron Association in 1960, later renamed the NATO Tiger Association, to strengthen ties between NATO air units.

===== de Gaulle's announcement =====
On 9 September 1965, President Charles de Gaulle announced that “by 1969 at the latest, the subordination described as integration, as planned by NATO and which hands over our destiny to foreign authority,” would come to an end. The year 1969 marked the 20th anniversary of the North Atlantic Treaty, which was originally concluded for that duration. De Gaulle deliberately left unclear whether France intended to denounce the treaty itself or merely cease participation in NATO’s integrated military structures. In a letter to U.S. President Lyndon B. Johnson dated 7 March 1966, de Gaulle clarified France’s position: France would remain a party to the Atlantic Alliance, stating, “France measures to what extent the defense solidarity thus established between fifteen free peoples of the West contributes to ensuring their security and, in particular, what essential role is played in this respect by the United States of America.” However, de Gaulle also declared that “France considers that the changes accomplished or in the process of being accomplished, since 1949 (...) no longer justify, as far as it is concerned, the military arrangements taken after the conclusion of the ‘alliance.’” He went on to affirm that France intended to “recover on its territory the entire exercise of its sovereignty, currently undermined by the permanent presence of allied military elements or by the habitual use which is made of its sky, to cease its participation in ‘integrated’ commands, and to no longer place forces at the disposal of NATO". This distinction between NATO as established by the 1949 treaty and the military structures created afterward became the foundation of France’s policy toward the Alliance for decades to come.

For de Gaulle, this decision effectively marked an exit from NATO’s military organization. “We no longer belong there, so to speak,” he confided to Alain Peyrefitte in 1964. On 13 October 1965, he elaborated: “NATO is desirable as long as a threat remains in the East. NATO, yes—but not NATO, not the integrated military organization under American command".

The decision provoked strong political reactions within France. In April 1966, the Federation of the Democratic and Socialist Left (FGDS) unsuccessfully filed a motion of censure against the Pompidou government, with Guy Mollet leading the charge. Maurice Faure of the Democratic Rally warned: “If each of our allies behaved as you do and took the decisions that you have just decreed, it would mean nothing other than the withdrawal of all American forces from the European continent". Former Prime Minister René Pleven also criticized the government, accusing it of deception: “You deceived us about your intentions; you did not tell them to the nation”.

===== Removal of NATO bases =====
In 1967, the NATO bases in France, primarily American, were closed and handed over to France. The total number of occupants included approximately 27,000 soldiers and 37,000 civilians. The organization's headquarters moved from Yvelines to Belgium.

===== Cooperation agreements =====
The implementation of France's exit from the integrated military organization proceeded rapidly in 1966 and was accompanied by a review of NATO’s structure. At the highest decision-making level, France remained a full member of the North Atlantic Council but no longer participated in the Defense Planning Committee or in the newly created Nuclear Planning Group.

An exchange of letters between the French and German governments, dated 21 December 1966, defined the status of the French forces stationed in Germany (Forces Françaises en Allemagne, FFA). In the military domain, negotiations on the conditions under which French forces would contribute to European defense in the event of a crisis or conflict concluded with the Ailleret-Lemnitzer agreements on 22 August 1967. These agreements significantly reduced the practical impact of the French withdrawal and clarified the role of the FFA in the defense of Western Europe. The pipeline network in Central Europe was not affected by these developments.

===== Normalization =====
The normalization of Franco-American relations, which began in 1968, was reinforced with the election of President Nixon. The intervention of Warsaw Pact troops in Czechoslovakia, the growing autonomy of the Federal Republic of Germany in pursuing détente with the East, and internal difficulties in France did not favor further attempts to transform NATO's organizational model.

France's allies adapted to the French nuclear force, which had become a concrete reality, and noted that the military cooperation envisioned in the Ailleret-Lemnitzer agreements was being implemented operationally to the satisfaction of all parties. Senior French military officials even made occasional public references to this cooperation.

In the final month of his presidency, de Gaulle undertook two actions reflecting the continued importance of relations with the United States in French foreign policy. One was symbolic: he attended Eisenhower’s funeral in Washington, where he met with Nixon. The other was more substantial: he instructed Michel Debré to confirm the renewal of France’s membership in the Atlantic Alliance.

=== Rapprochement, 1970 to 1991 ===
Until the end of the Cold War, three presidents succeeded one another, managing the legacy left by Charles de Gaulle without making significant changes, while adapting to the fluctuations in East–West relations and developments in the European context. National independence was consolidated, and France’s nuclear deterrent force continued to develop throughout the 1970s. The link between strategic and tactical nuclear capabilities and conventional forces was firmly established, supported by the unified command structure of the French armed forces. During this period, however, France had to accept the prevailing Atlantic status quo, as its European partners showed no willingness to distance themselves from the United States—particularly following the détente period of 1969–1975, which was succeeded by renewed tensions with the Soviet Union.

In December 1980, Édouard Balladur highlighted two key points in an article published in Le Figaro: "France is a member of the Atlantic Alliance" and it "is not part of NATO, under American command". A few months later, the election of François Mitterrand marked what Paul-Marie de La Gorce described as an "Atlantic shift" in France’s foreign policy.

As the first Socialist president of the Fifth Republic, François Mitterrand repeatedly affirmed France’s commitment to the Atlantic Alliance, while ruling out rejoining NATO’s integrated military command: “France has not left the Atlantic Alliance. It has not left the Atlantic defensive military alliance. It has left the NATO integrated command and, therefore, there is no question of returning under the orders of the integrated command".

==== Strengthening cooperation ====
Unable to fundamentally transform NATO, France opted to strengthen its cooperation with the Atlantic Alliance. In line with NATO's forward defense strategy—which aimed to counter a Soviet offensive as close as possible to the eastern border of the Federal Republic of Germany—and consistent with the reorganization of the French armed forces following the Algerian War, French forces became NATO’s strategic reserve, with terms of engagement clarified as their operational capabilities improved.

Military strength of the Atlantic Alliance in Central Europe (1988)
Country	Military personnel	%
Benelux	137,000	12%
Denmark	21,000	2%
France	267,000	24%
FRG	352,000	31%
United Kingdom	141,000	12%
United States (in Europe)	216,000	19%
TOTAL	1,134,000	100%

The agreements signed in July 1974 between Generals Valentin and Ferber expanded the scope of cooperation between France and NATO to include the entire 1st Army, while maintaining France’s autonomy in deciding on the commitment of its forces. This cooperation was seen as necessary by both parties: France could not envisage defending its own territory if the battle in Germany were lost, and NATO valued the strategic reserve provided by the French forces, whose equipment—initially limited—improved significantly from the early 1970s onward. However, nuclear policy remained a point of divergence. Following the 1966 withdrawal, the French military had been without tactical nuclear weapons but regained this capability in 1973 with the air-delivered AN-52 and in 1974 with the deployment of Pluton missiles. The doctrine governing the use of these weapons diverged from NATO policy. NATO had adopted a flexible response strategy, aiming to raise the threshold for nuclear use to limit the risk of escalation. This required conventional forces to engage Warsaw Pact forces long enough to determine Soviet intentions. In contrast, France’s strategy linked the maneuvering of its FFA units to the early use of tactical nuclear weapons, intended as a final warning before any escalation to strategic nuclear strikes.

The period of détente ended in the late 1970s. Tensions in East–West relations resurfaced in the early 1980s, notably over the Euromissiles and the Soviet invasion of Afghanistan. These developments led to a political rapprochement between France and its allies, reminiscent of the 1958–1962 Berlin crisis period. Throughout the Cold War, France consistently demonstrated its Atlantic solidarity during times of crisis. While Paris did not consider reversing the 1966 decisions, intensified cooperation during the 1980s—both in terms of doctrines governing the deployment of French forces alongside NATO integrated forces and through regular joint exercises—made France’s contribution to NATO more credible. French forces, which represented approximately 15% of NATO's integrated capabilities, were significant in both quantity and improving quality, particularly as the focus on nuclear capability began to ease. These forces constituted NATO’s only directly operational strategic reserve in the event of a surprise attack by Warsaw Pact forces.

==== East-West negotiations ====
In June 1968, at a meeting in Reykjavik, NATO invited the Warsaw Pact to begin negotiations on a mutual and balanced reduction of conventional forces in Central Europe. Soviet leader Leonid Brezhnev gave his agreement in principle on 14 May 1971. (Note: These negotiations are most often identified by their acronym "MBFR".) France opposed this initiative, as it rejected bloc-to-bloc discussions, which it viewed as contrary to its policy of independence and its vision of détente in Europe. In practice, negotiations—without France—began in 1973 and continued throughout the 1970s without producing any tangible results.

In the mid-1970s, the Soviet Union began deploying SS-20 missiles, which were capable of striking targets across Europe and were significantly more advanced than the SS-4 and SS-5 models they replaced. This development initiated the Euromissile crisis. Concerns over these theater nuclear weapons overshadowed ongoing discussions about conventional force reductions. In late 1977, NATO’s Nuclear Planning Group—of which France was not a member—initiated the modernization of NATO’s intermediate-range nuclear forces as part of its flexible response strategy, a doctrine never accepted by France. On 12 December 1979, the Atlantic Council (with France participating) and the Defense Planning Committee decided to deploy new intermediate-range missiles—Pershing II and ground-launched cruise missiles—in Western Europe starting in 1983, should the Soviet Union refuse to withdraw its own systems.

François Mitterrand, elected President on 10 May 1981, maintained France's support for NATO’s deployment decision, strengthened relations with the United States, and adopted a firmer stance toward Moscow than his predecessor, Valéry Giscard- d'Estaing. The Soviet Union, in turn, expressed willingness to negotiate, but only on the condition that British and French nuclear forces were included in any agreement. Mitterrand categorically rejected this condition, as it would place the French nuclear deterrent under the influence of an American–Soviet agreement. He summarized the imbalance with a now well-known statement: “Pacifism is in the West, and the Euromissiles are in the East. I think this is an unequal relationship”. Negotiations on intermediate-range nuclear forces (INF), which had begun in October 1980, soon stalled. NATO proceeded with the first deployment of Pershing II missiles in Germany in 1983. In response, the Soviet Union withdrew from both the INF and the ongoing conventional arms reduction talks.

The rise of Mikhail Gorbachev to power in March 1985 marked a significant shift in East–West relations and reinvigorated negotiations on both nuclear and conventional forces in Europe. In January 1986, Gorbachev proposed a comprehensive nuclear disarmament program to the United States, including the elimination of intermediate-range nuclear weapons in Europe, in line with the "zero option" favored by U.S. President Ronald Reagan. The proposal explicitly excluded British and French nuclear arsenals from the scope of the INF agreement. Substantive negotiations resumed and led to the signing of the INF Treaty in December 1987.

In June 1986, the Soviet Union and the other Warsaw Pact states proposed restarting talks on conventional forces in Europe, with more ambitious aims than those of the earlier MBFR (Mutual and Balanced Force Reductions) negotiations. These talks, now held within a framework defined by the OSCE and acceptable to France, officially began in Vienna on 9 March 1989 between the 23 NATO and Warsaw Pact member states. They progressed rapidly, culminating in the signing of the Treaty on Conventional Armed Forces in Europe (CFE) in Paris on 19 November 1990 by 22 NATO and Warsaw Pact countries, including France.

== France and NATO from 1990 to the present day ==
The fall of communist regimes in Europe and the subsequent dissolution of the Soviet Union marked the end of the Cold War and raised questions about the future of the Atlantic Alliance, originally created to defend Europe against the Soviet threat. The Warsaw Pact was officially dissolved on 1 July 1991. NATO, rather than dissolving, embarked on a process of transformation, successfully redefining its mission and later expanding to include countries from Central and Eastern Europe. France accepted this transformation and progressively reintegrated into NATO’s military structures.

At the NATO summit held in London on 5–6 July 1990, the Alliance acknowledged the end of the Cold War, the reunification of Germany, and the need to modernize its objectives. President François Mitterrand stated: “NATO, which has remarkably ensured our security (...) must today adapt to the new situation in Europe. (...) Our Alliance must maintain its cohesion. It demonstrated this by reaffirming the need for the presence of American forces in Europe and by supporting the membership of a unified Germany in NATO. (...) The time has come to establish new relationships in Europe, where everyone is interested in the security of this continent. It seems to me that NATO, by adapting, can play a very useful role in this evolution".

=== NATO post-Cold War strategy ===
With the dissolution of the Soviet Union at the end of 1991, NATO's transformation accelerated. At the Rome summit in November 1991, NATO adopted a new strategic concept, opened further toward the countries of Central and Eastern Europe, and sought to redefine its relationship with emerging European institutions in matters of security and defense. President François Mitterrand supported the continued relevance of NATO and endorsed the strategic redefinition of its role, arguing that the disappearance of the Soviet bloc did not signify the end of all security threats. However, he opposed the idea of NATO assuming a political role, which he considered the prerogative of individual nations and the European Union, then taking shape through the Treaty of Maastricht.

The final declaration of the Rome summit stated that "increasing the role and responsibilities of European members constitutes an important foundation for the renovation of NATO," while also affirming NATO’s pre-eminence: "We intend, at the same time as the emergence and development of a European security identity and Europe’s role in defense, to consolidate the fundamental transatlantic link, of which NATO is the guarantor, and fully maintain the strategic unity and indivisibility of the security of all Allies".

The Maastricht Treaty, signed in February 1992, established a Common Foreign and Security Policy (CFSP) for the European Union, which included "all issues relating to the security of the European Union, including the long-term definition of a common defense policy (ESDP), which could lead, when the time comes, to a common defense." However, traditional differences among EU member states prevented the rapid implementation of an independent European defense policy. Under the treaty's provisions, the Western European Union (WEU) continued to define European defense policy, while NATO remained the only operational military structure in Europe—until the inability of the WEU and the EU to manage the conflicts in the former Yugoslavia prompted a shift in thinking during 1998–1999. In June 1992, the WEU adopted the Petersberg Declaration, which limited future European military action to peacekeeping and humanitarian missions.

The Yugoslav Wars, beginning in 1991, marked NATO’s first military operations, carried out under the authority of the United Nations. These missions revealed the operational limitations of the WEU and EU and increasingly required NATO intervention. France, deeply involved in these operations—particularly as it held command of UNPROFOR—came to recognize that NATO resources were indispensable. As a result, closer cooperation between NATO and the WEU was formalized at the NATO Summit in Brussels in January 1994. To avoid duplication of military resources, it was agreed that NATO would make its collective assets available, following consultation within the North Atlantic Council, for WEU-led operations conducted by European Allies under the CFSP, in situations affecting European security but not requiring full NATO involvement. This Brussels Summit marked the introduction of the concept of a "European identity in security and defense" into NATO discourse. However, it did not lead to a revision of NATO's operating procedures. President François Mitterrand, who remained in office until May 1995, continued to oppose France’s reintegration into NATO’s military command, despite increasing collaboration and exchanges between French and NATO officers during operations in the former Yugoslavia.

=== French return to NATO decision-making, 1995–2008 ===
With the election of Jacques Chirac as President of France, the country moved closer to NATO in an effort to influence decisions from within, particularly with the aim of further Europeanizing the Alliance’s decision-making structures. At the North Atlantic Council meeting in December 1995, France announced the return of the Chief of Staff of the Armed Forces (CEMA) to the Military Committee and of the Minister of Defense to the Atlantic Council, though French forces remained outside NATO's integrated military command structure. In return, France sought to obtain command of the Alliance’s southern theater of operations (AFSOUTH) between 1995 and 1997, a request that was ultimately denied by the United States. From March to June 1999, President Chirac committed French military forces to NATO-led airstrikes on the Federal Republic of Yugoslavia, despite the absence of a United Nations mandate for the operation.

France's participation in NATO decision-making bodies and structures
Category	Instance	Creation	1949–1950	1951–1966	1967–1995	1996–2003	2004–2008	2009–2016
High-level decision-making bodies	North Atlantic Council	1949	F	F	F (1)	F	F	F
High-level decision-making bodies	Defense (Plans) Committee	1949	F	F	X	X	X	BORN
High-level decision-making bodies	Nuclear Plans Group	1966	BORN	BORN	X	X	X	X
Military structures	Military Committee	1949	F	F	X	F	F	F
Military structures	International military staff	1951	BORN	F	X	F	F	F
Military structures	Cdt. ally Europe (ACE)	1951	BORN	F	F	F	BORN	
Military structures	Cdt. Ally Transformation (ACT)	2003	BORN				F	F
Military structures	Cdt. Allied Operations (ACO)	2003	BORN				F	F
Civil structures	Committees reporting to the Board	1950	F	F	F (2)	F	F	F
Civil structures	International Secretariat	1951	BORN	F	F	F	F	F
Legend and notes (1) The Minister of Defense does not participate in ministerial meetings (2) France continues to participate in most Committees						F	= Full participation of France	
Legend and notes (1) The Minister of Defense does not participate in ministerial meetings (2) France continues to participate in most Committees						F	= Partial participation of France	
Legend and notes (1) The Minister of Defense does not participate in ministerial meetings (2) France continues to participate in most Committees						X	= No participation from France	
Legend and notes (1) The Minister of Defense does not participate in ministerial meetings (2) France continues to participate in most Committees						BORN	= Not existing at this time	

==== Europeanization of NATO ====
Four decades after the failure of the European Defense Community, France renewed efforts to establish a European defense capacity within the frameworks of the Western European Union (WEU) and the European Union (EU). However, France's partners were reluctant to move beyond intergovernmental consultations, limited collaborative weapons programs, and symbolic initiatives such as the creation of the Franco-German brigade.

At the same time, France opposed the U.S.-driven expansion of NATO to non-European countries. At the Riga Summit in 2006, President Chirac opposed any such development, stating: “In certain cases, NATO associates certain countries with its contributions to military operations, by mutual agreement. This is what is happening in Afghanistan. But there was never any question of extending NATO to Asia, or anywhere else. (...) NATO can only function properly as a military defense structure between the United States, Canada, and Europe”.

=== French return to integrated military organizations ===
President Nicolas Sarkozy completed France’s return to NATO’s integrated military command, a move prepared since 2007 and approved by the French Parliament on 17 March 2009. The reintegration was officially ratified at the NATO summit held on 3–4 April 2009. France, however, did not rejoin the Nuclear Planning Group, in order to maintain its autonomy in nuclear deterrence policy.

In practical terms, this decision led to the deployment of several hundred French personnel to NATO’s fifteen military command headquarters. France also secured two key leadership positions within the Alliance: the Supreme Allied Commander Transformation (SACT), based in Norfolk, United States, and a joint command headquarters in Lisbon, responsible notably for oversight of the NATO Response Force (NRF), to which France contributes substantially in terms of both personnel and resources.

==== France's contribution to the defense effort ====
Main contributing countries to the NATO budget
Country	Country's contribution as a % of the total NATO budget for 2016 and 2017	% of GDP (est. year 2016)
France	10.6339	1.78
United States	22.1446	3.61
United Kingdom	9.8485	2.21
Germany	14.6500	1.19
Italy	8.4109	1.11
The Netherlands	3.1804	1.17
Canada	6.6092	0.99

France ranks third among NATO member states in contributions to the Alliance's common budget. Contributions from NATO’s 29 member states are calculated using a cost-sharing formula based on each country's gross national income. France also covers direct costs associated with NATO operations in which it elects to participate. Since 2006, NATO has set a long-term objective for each member state to allocate 2% of its GDP to defense spending. As of 2016, only five countries had met this target. France was approaching the benchmark, in contrast to many European Union member states, from whom it regularly called for increased contributions to European defense and international operations—areas where France believes it carries a disproportionate burden. The United States, by comparison, maintains significantly higher levels of defense spending than other major Western industrialized nations, reinforcing both its dominant role within NATO and its ongoing calls for increased European defense commitments.

==== Positions of France in intra-NATO debates ====
Although NATO unity remains a primary objective, France has occasionally expressed disagreements with some of the Alliance's policies and operational approaches. One notable example is France's opposition to the American initiative for a missile defense shield in Europe. France views this project as a potential threat to its nuclear deterrence capabilities, both by competing with and potentially undermining its nuclear forces. Additionally, the anti-missile shield involves substantial industrial and financial commitments, which France finds concerning. The declaration at NATO's Warsaw Summit in July 2016 referenced an "appropriate combination" for NATO’s deterrence and defense system, which includes nuclear capabilities, conventional forces, and missile defense systems".

In November 2019, President Emmanuel Macron notably described NATO as experiencing "brain death" in an interview with The Economist, citing the Turkish intervention in northern Syria, which was conducted without the consensus of other NATO members.

=== French material and operational contributions ===
As NATO's scope expanded beyond the defense of member states against the Soviet threat, the Alliance began to engage in missions beyond its original territorial borders. This shift marked NATO's evolving role in maintaining global peace and security, particularly where the interests of its members were at stake.

Following the terrorist attacks of September 11, 2001, NATO invoked Article 5 of the Washington Treaty for the first and only time in its history, declaring that the attack against the United States was considered an attack on all NATO members, including France.

In September 2021, a $56 billion contract for the sale of a diesel-powered Suffren-class submarine from France's Naval Group to Australia was abruptly canceled. Australia chose to purchase American nuclear-powered submarines as part of the new AUKUS defense arrangement instead. This decision, along with Switzerland's subsequent choice to buy American F-35s over French Dassault Rafale or Eurofighter Typhoons, reignited opposition within parts of the French political class to continued participation in NATO's command structure.

During the 2022 French presidential election campaign, the question of France's relationship with NATO was raised by various candidates, amid Russia's invasion of Ukraine. Four candidates (Emmanuel Macron, Valérie Pécresse, Anne Hidalgo, and Yannick Jadot) expressed support for France's continued membership in NATO. Three candidates (Marine Le Pen, Éric Zemmour, and Nicolas Dupont-Aignan) advocated for France to leave NATO's military command, while five others (Jean-Luc Mélenchon, Fabien Roussel, Philippe Poutou, Nathalie Arthaud, and Jean Lassalle) called for France to exit NATO entirely.

=== French participation in major NATO operations ===
Start year	Year end	Operation area	Operation name	Mandate UN	Participation of the European Union	Participation of France
1993	1996	Adriatic	"Sharp Guard”	#820 No. 943		Under the joint control of NATO and the WEU, a vast naval blockade operation, in which 14 nations including France are participating.
1993	1995	Bosnia and Herzegovina	"Deny Flight”	#816		Overflight ban operation in which France is participating. A Mirage 2000 is lost due to damage.
1995	1995	Bosnia and Herzegovina	"Deliberate Force”	coordinated with UNPROFOR		Massive bombing of Bosnian Serb positions. France participates with planes – of which a Mirage 2000N will be lost – and artillery pieces.
1996	1996	Bosnia and Herzegovina	IFOR	#1031		Succeeding UNPROFOR, deployment of a force of 60,000 men, including around 7,500 French soldiers, acting as part of "Operation Joint Endeavor"
1997	2004	Bosnia and Herzegovina	SFOR	#1088	Takeover by EUFOR Althea	SFOR takes over from IFOR, with resources reduce Treaty of Paris to 32,000 men.
1999	1999	Kosovo (Serbia)	"Allied Force”	–		Aerial bombings on Serbia carried out by NATO in the context of Kosovo gaining independence against Serbia's wishes. France participates by carrying out approximately 3% of the bombing missions carried out by several hundred NATO aircraft.
1999	–	Kosovo	KFOR	#1244		Since the beginning, France has contributed to this force, the largest contingents of which are provided by Germany, Italy and the United States
2001	2016	Mediterranean	Active Endeavor (OAE)	–		
2001	2003	North Macedonia	"Essential Harvest”	–	"EUFOR Concordia" takes over	NATO's intervention results from a request from Maonia and consultations with the OSCE and the EU. France contributes significantly to the Task Force of around 3,500 men. The lesser operations "Renard Roux" and "Allied Harmony" followed before the EU took over.
2003	2014	Afghanistan	ISAF	#1386		France participates in the ISAF throughout its existence. In 2011–2012, when the ISAF reached its highest level of strength with around 130,000 men, the United States contributed 90,000 men, the United Kingdom 9,000, Germany 5,000 and the France for 4,000
2015	–	Afghanistan	Resolute Support	#2189		In 2015 and 2016, France did not provide troops to this training and supervision operation for the Afghan army which mobilized around 12,000 men from NATO and partner countries
2009	2016	Somalia	"Ocean Shield”	#1814 #1816	"Atalanta" conducted in parallel	Naval anti-piracy operation off the coast of Somalia, completed in November 2016. France is participating in the EUNAVFOR Atalanta operation of the same nature extended in November 2016 by the EU until 2018.
2016	–	Mediterranean	Sea Guardian			Naval operation which follows on from Ocean Shield. In 2016, France did not directly engage its ships there.
2011	2011	Libya	"Unified Protector”	#1970 #1973		France is, via Operation Harmattan, one of the main players in the air-naval intervention in Libya coordinated by NATO.

== France's foreign relations with NATO member states ==
- Albania
- Belgium
- Bulgaria
- Canada
- Croatia
- Czech Republic
- Denmark
- Estonia
- Finland
- Germany
- Greece
- Hungary
- Iceland
- Italy
- Latvia
- Lithuania
- Luxembourg
- Montenegro
- Netherlands
- North Macedonia
- Norway
- Poland
- Portugal
- Romania
- Slovakia
- Slovenia
- Spain
- Sweden
- Turkey
- United Kingdom
- United States

== See also ==
- Foreign relations of France
- Foreign relations of NATO

== Bibliography ==
- Raflik, Jenny (2013). La IVe République et l'Alliance atlantique: influence et dépendance, 1945–1958 (Thesis). Rennes: Presses universitaires de Rennes. ISBN 9782753528000.
- Secretary Marshall (1947). "Avalon Project - A Decade of American Foreign Policy 1941-1949 - Fifth Meeting of the Council of Foreign Ministers, London". avalon.law.yale.edu.
- Soutou, Georges-Henri (2010). La Guerre froide: 1943–1990. Paris: Pluriel. ISBN 978-2-8185-0127-6.
- Conseil d l'Atlantique Nord (1949). "Directive du Comité militaire au Groupe permanent [archive]" (PDF).
- Conseil de l'Atlantique Nord (2009). "Les soixante ans du Conseil de l'Atlantique nord".
- Bozo, Frédéric (1996). Deux stratégies pour l'Europe: De Gaulle, les États-Unis et l'Alliance atlantique 1958 – 1969. Collection Espoir. Paris: Plon. ISBN 978-2-259-18392-5.
- Bozo, Frédéric (1991). La France et l'OTAN: de la guerre froide au nouvel ordre européen. Travaux et recherches de l'IFRI. Institut français des relations internationales. Paris: Masson. ISBN 978-2-225-82485-2.
- Dumoulin, André (2013). Histoire de la dissuasion nucléaire. Histoires. Paris: Argos. ISBN 978-2-36614-004-0.
- Secretaires du Groupe Permanent (1949). "Le Concept stratégique pour la défense de la zone de l'Atlantique Nord (DC 6/1)" (PDF). NATO / OTAN (Site officiel).
- Commission du. (1949). "Débats parlementaires de la 4e République (pages 1666–1669)" (PDF). Archived from the original (PDF) on 2023-11-17.
- NATO / OTAN (2001). "NATO the first five years 1949–1954 – The first steps" (PDF). Archived from the original (PDF) on 2023-11-17.
- U.S. Department of State / Office of the Historian (1950a). "United States Minutes, Private Meeting of the Foreign Ministers, New York September 12, 1950". Archived from the original on July 31, 2016.
- U.S. Department of State / Office of the Historian (1950b). "United States Delegation Minutes, First Meeting of the Foreign Ministers, New York, Waldorf Astoria, September 12, 1950, 3 p.m." Archived from the original on 2013-12-06.
- Trachtenberg, Marc; Gehrz, Christopher (n.d.). "America, Europe, and German Rearmament, August–September 1950: A Critique of a Myth".
- NATO / OTAN (Official website) (1950). "Documents émis lors de la cinquième session du Conseil de l'Atlantique Nord".
- NATO / OTAN (Official website) (2000). "North Atlantic Council – Brussels 18th–19th Dec 1950 – Final Communiqué".
- Documentation Française (n.d.). "Chronologie de l'OTAN". Archived from the original on 2022-10-09.
- NATO / OTAN (Official website) (2009). "OTAN Hebdo".
- NATO / OTAN (Official website) (n.d.a). "Texte du Protocole d'accession au Traité de l'Atlantique Nord de la RFA". Archived from the original on 2010-03-05.
- NATO / OTAN (Official website) (n.d.b). "Le retrait de la France du commandement intégré de l'OTAN" (PDF).
- CVCE – Centre Virtuel de la Connaissance sur l'Europe (1954). "Traité de Bruxelles modifié (Protocoles signés à Paris le 23 octobre 1954)".
- legifrance.gouv.fr (1954). "Décret du 22 octobre 1954 portant nomination d'un représentant permanent de la France auprès du Conseil de l'OTAN".
- NATO / OTAN (Official website) (1951a). "Convention sur le statut de l'Organisation du Traité de l'Atlantique Nord".
- Vignes, Daniel-Henri (1955). "La personnalité juridique de l'O.T.A.N." Annuaire Français de Droit International. 1 (1): 471–475. doi:10.3406/afdi.1955.3250.
- NATO / OTAN (Official website) (1951b). "North Atlantic Council - Seventh session - Final Communiqué".
- Raflik, Jenny (2008). "La France et la genèse institutionnfelle de l'Alliance atlantique (1949–1952)". Relations Internationales (in French). 134 (2): 55–68. doi:10.3917/ri.134.0055. ISSN 0335-2013.
- INA (n.d.). A votre service | INA (in French) – via www.ina.fr.
- Kane, Tim (2004). "Global U.S. Troop Deployment, 1950–2003". The Heritage Foundation. Archived from the original on February 19, 2017.
- NATO / OTAN (Official website) (1957). "Final Communiqué". www.nato.int.
- Général de Gaulle (1958). "Lettre et mémorandum du général de Gaulle au général Eisenhower (17 septembre 1958)". CVCE.EU by UNI.LU (in French).
- "Copie de la réponse d'Eisenhower (dans le dossier préparé pour la rencontre entre Kennedy et de Gaulle du 31 mai 1961)". www.jfklibrary.org. Kennedy library. 1961.
- Peyrefitte, Alain (1994). Peyrefitte, Alain (ed.). La France redevient la France. C'était de Gaulle / Alain Peyrefitte. Paris: Fayard. ISBN 978-2-213-02832-3.
- U.S. Department of State / Office of the Historian (1959). "Doc 141. Letter from President de Gaulle to President Eisenhower".
- Kerherve, Alain (2011). "Au général Eisenhower, une vision gaulliste toujours d'actualité". Gaullisme.fr (in French).
- de Gaulle, Charles (1966). "Lettre de Charles de Gaulle à Lyndon B. Johnson (7 mars 1966)".
- CVCE – Centre Virtuel de la Connaissance sur l'Europe (1966). "Aide-mémoire du gouvernement français aux quatorze représentants des gouvernements membres de l'OTAN (11 mars 1966)" (PDF).
- Persée (1966). "Le retrait de la France des structures militaires de 1'O.T.A.N. et les forces françaises d'Allemagne". Annuaire Français de Droit International. 12 (1): 784–798. doi:10.3406/afdi.1966.1906.
- Peyrefitte, Alain (1997). C'était de Gaulle: 1963-1966. Paris: de Fallois Fayard. ISBN 978-2-213-59458-3.
- INA (1966). "Assemblée nationale: le débat de censure".
- Assemblée nationale (République française) (1966). "Assemblée nationale – Débats parlementaires – Séance du mardi 19 avril 1966" (PDF).
- Pompidou, Georges (1966). Discours de Georges Pompidou à l'Assemblée nationale (in French) – via www.ina.fr.
- Dargent, Raphaël (2019). "Allié, mais pas vassal: Le 7 mars 1966, De Gaulle sort de l'OTAN". www.revuemethode.org.
- Dervaux-Desbiens, Elodie (2018). "Le départ des troupes américaines, mars 1967". Enseigner de Gaulle (in French).
- NATO / OTAN (Official website) (1966). "Conseil de l'Atlantique Nord (CAN) – Communiqué final de la réunion des 15–16 décembre 1966".
- Balladur, Édouard (1980). "Retour à la guerre froide?". Le Figaro.
- Institut François Mitterrand (2011). "François Mitterrand - 1981-1988: Politique internationale".
- La Gorce, Paul Marie de; Moschetto, Bruno (2004). La Ve République. Que sais-je? (2e éd ed.). Paris: Presses universitaires de France. ISBN 978-2-13-037293-6.
- Raflik, Jenny (2011). "François Mitterrand et l'Otan". Matériaux pour l'histoire de notre temps (in French). 101–102 (1–2): 35–38. doi:10.3917/mate.101.0009. ISSN 0769-3206.
- Bozo, Frédéric (2011). "François Mitterrand et la fin de la guerre froide (1981-1991)". Matériaux pour l'histoire de notre temps (in French). 101–102 (1–2): 39–45. doi:10.3917/mate.101.0010. ISSN 0769-3206.
- Vie-publique (1983). "Texte du discours de François Mitterrand au Bundestag". Archived from the original on 2010-03-31.
- General Secretary Mikhail Gorbachev (1986). "General Secretary Mikhail Gorbachev Letter to President Ronald Reagan January 14 1986".
- NATO / OTAN (official Website) (1990). "Déclaration sur une Alliance de l'Atlantique Nord rénovée ("Déclaration de Londres")".
- "Intervention de M. François Mitterrand, Président de la République, lors du sommet de l'Atlantique Nord, Londres, le 5 juillet 1990". www.vie-publique.fr. 5 July 1990.
- Mitterrand, François (1990). "Conférence de presse de François Mitterrand". www.vie-publique.fr. Archived from the original on 2017-07-13.
- Wörner, Manfred (1991). "L'OTAN transformée: la portée du sommet de Rome". Archived from the original on 2017-07-14.
- Vie-publique (1991). "Conférence de presse de François Mitterrand (Rome, le 8 novembre 1991)". Archived from the original on 2017-01-05.
- Andréani, Gilles (1998). "La France et l'OTAN après la guerre froide". Politique étrangère. 63 (1): 77–92. doi:10.3406/polit.1998.4726.
- Documentation Française (n.d.a). "L'OTAN après la guerre froide". Archived from the original on 2021-05-06.
- Durandin, Catherine (2013). "C. Durandin publie "OTAN, histoire et fin ?", Diploweb.com". www.diploweb.com.
- Vaïsse, Maurice (2009). "La France et l'OTAN: une histoire". Politique étrangère (in French). Hiver (4): 861–872. doi:10.3917/pe.094.0861. ISSN 0032-342X.
- Mongrenier, Jean-Sylvestre (2005). "La nouvelle OTAN: des rivages nord-atlantiques aux confins eurasiatiques". Hérodote (in French). 118 (3): 27–47. doi:10.3917/her.118.0027. ISSN 0338-487X.
- NATO / OTAN (Official Website) (1991). "Déclaration de Rome sur la Paix et la Coopération".
- Soetendorp, Ben (2002). "La construction d'une défense européenne: émergence d'un défi politique et appels à résolution". Revue internationale et stratégique (in French). 48 (4): 119–128. doi:10.3917/ris.048.0119. ISSN 1287-1672.
- Documentation Française (n.d.b). "L'Europe de la défense". Archived from the original on 2017-05-30.
- Conseil des ministres de l'Union de l'Europe occidentale (1992). "Déclaration de Petersberg faite par le Conseil des ministres de l'UEO (Bonn, 19 juin 1992)".
- nato.int (1999). "LE DEVELOPPEMENT DE L'IDENTITE EUROPEENNE DE SECURITE ET DE DEFENSE (IESD) AU SEIN DE L'OTAN" (PDF).
- vie-publique.fr (n.d.). "Conférence de presse conjointe de MM. François Mitterrand, Président de la République, et Alain Juppé, ministre des affaires étrangères, Bruxelles le 11 janvier 1994". Archived from the original on 2024-05-01.
- La Gorce, Paul-Marie de (1996). "Retour honteux de la France dans l'OTAN". Le Monde diplomatique (in French).
- Quilès, Paul (1958). "N°1495. – RAPPORT D'INFORMATION de M. Paul QUILES déposé en application de l'article 145 du Règlement par la commission de la défense nationale et des forces armées sur les négociations relatives au concept stratégique de l'OTAN et leurs conséquences sur la politique de défense et de sécrité". www.assemblee-nationale.fr.
- Semo, Marc; Haski, Pierre (1999). "Une légalité contestable. L'Otan est passée outre la nécessaire résolution de l'ONU". Libération (in French).
- Vie-publique (2006). "Conférence de presse de M. Jacques Chirac à Riga le 29 novembre". Archived from the original on 2022-10-09.
- NATO / OTAN (official Website) (2019). "Le Groupe des plans nucléaires (NPG)".
- NATO / OTAN (official Website) (2024). "Le financement de l'OTAN".
- NATO / OTAN (official Website) (2016). "Les dépenses de défense des pays de l'OTAN (2009–2016)".
- Guibert, Nathalie (2016a). "Le sommet de l'OTAN à Varsovie, une étape vers le bouclier antimissile". Le Monde.fr (in French).
- Guibert, Nathalie (2016b). "La saga du bouclier antimissile de l'OTAN". Le Monde.fr (in French).
- RFI (2019). "Emmanuel Macron juge l'Otan en état de "mort cérébrale"". RFI (in French).
- OTAN (2001). "Déclaration du Conseil de l'Atlantique Nord". www.nato.int.
- NATO / OTAN (official Website) (1949). "Le Traité de l'Atlantique Nord". NATO (in French).
- NATO / OTAN (official Website) (2010). "La signature des Accords de paix de Dayton il y a 15 ans: une étape importante pour l'OTAN et les Balkans".
- CVCE – Centre Virtuel de la Connaissance sur l'Europe (n.d.). "Les accords de Dayton – Les bouleversements géopolitiques en Europe après 1989 – CVCE Website". www.cvce.eu.
- Le Pautremat, Pascal (2009). "La Bosnie-Herzégovine en guerre (1991–1995): au cŒur de l'Europe". Guerres Mondiales et Conflits Contemporains (in French). 233 (1): 67–81. doi:10.3917/gmcc.233.0067. ISSN 0984-2292.
- imagesdefense.gouv.fr (2010). "Les soixante ans de l'OTAN" (PDF). Archived from the original (PDF) on 2024-06-29.
- Le Monde (2021). "Podcast. Tout comprendre à la crise des sous-marins australiens".
- LCI (2021). "Avant les sous-marins australiens, le cas des F-35 américains préférés aux Rafale par la Suisse". TF1 INFO (in French).
- Cantié, Valérie (2022). "Rester dans l'Otan un peu, beaucoup, pas du tout: ce que proposent les candidats à la présidentielle". France Inter (in French).
- NATO / OTAN (official Website) (n.d.c). "Le rôle de l'OTAN au Kosovo". Archived from the original on 2010-03-05.
- NATO / OTAN (official Website) (2011). "International Security Assistance Force (ISAF): Key Facts and Figures – 25 January 2011" (PDF).
- nato.int (n.d.). "NATO's Resolute Support Mission in Afghanistan". Archived from the original on 2024-04-25.
