= Capital of Culture =

Capital of Culture or City of Culture may refer to:

- European Capital of Culture, formerly European City of Culture, title awarded annually in the European Union
- American Capital of Culture, in the Americas, title awarded annually by American Capital of Culture Organization, an NGO
- Arab Capital of Culture, in the Arab League, title awarded annually under the supervision of UNESCO
- Turkic Capital of Culture, in the Turkic speaking areas, title awarded annually by TURKSOY
- Lithuanian Capital of Culture, in Lithuania, title awarded annually to encourage the development of culture and arts
- National capital of culture, in Serbia, title awarded annually to a city
- UK City of Culture, title awarded quadrennially, for the first time in 2013
- City of Culture of Galicia, complex of cultural buildings in Santiago de Compostela, Spain
- The Pool (play), subtitled City of Culture?, 2004 play
