= Lithuanian Capital of Culture =

The Lithuanian Capital of Culture (Lithuanian: Lietuvos kultūros sostinė) is a city designated for a period of one calendar year, during which it is given a chance to showcase its cultural life and development. The aim of the project is to encourage the cultural activity of inhabitants of Lithuanian towns and cities and to develop culture and art in the regions.

== Regional Capitals of Culture ==
The initiative began in 2008, with Zarasai being chosen as the first Capital of Culture. In 2014 the project was expanded to include smaller Regional Capitals of Culture (Lithuanian: Lietuvos mažosios kultūros sostinės). This initiative aims to strengthen cultural traditions, promote professional art, develop cultural tourism, and encourage new creative initiatives in different regions. Naisiai was the first town to be declared the country's Regional Capital of Culture in 2015, and since then, 10 towns and cities have been selected each year. The Ministry of Culture supports and promotes this initiative, with the Lithuanian Council for Culture allocating 50,000 euros annually to the most important projects since 2018. The Lithuanian Union of Rural Communities initiates the competition, with partners including the Association of Lithuanian Municipalities, the Ministry of Culture, and the Association of Lithuanian Elders. Many of these regional capitals utilise the efforts of local enthusiasts, cultural workers, and volunteers to create memorable cultural events for the local community, and to develop new cultural tourism initiatives, especially activities that focus on unique local aspects of culture.

Regional Capitals of Culture proposals have included such activities as a reconstructed cultural centre, and a new organ music hall (Kėdainiai, 2026), and thematic areas based on 'waves' alongside a proposal to become a cultural resort (Zarasai). In 2024 Kaišiadorys's proposal was themed around its identity as a crossroads between four other towns, and Druskininkai's proposal was based on celebrating the 150th anniversary of the birth of painter, composer and writer M. K. Čiurlionis, and sought to commemorate him, as well as writers Vytautas Bložė and his wife Nijolė Miliauskaitė, Ričardas Gavelis, and sculptor Jacques Lipchitz.

== Cities ==
Year	National Capital of Culture	Regional Capital of Culture (by county)									
Year	National Capital of Culture	Alytus	Kaunas	Klaipėda	Marijampolė	Panevėžys	Šiauliai	Tauragė	Telšiai	Utena	Vilnius
2008	Zarasai										
2009	Plungė										
2010	Ramygala										
2011	Šilutė										
2012	Anykščiai										
2013	Palanga										
2014	Panevėžys										
2015	Žagarė						Naisiai				
2016	Telšiai										
2017	Klaipėda								Ukrinai	Labanoras	
2018	Marijampolė										
2019	Rokiškis				Liudvinavas		Baisogala				
2020	Trakai			Veiviržėnai							
2021	Neringa	Valkininkai	Krakės	Barstyčiai	Klausučiai	Tiltagaliai	Juodeikiai	Veliuona	Nevarėnai	Vyžuonos	Deltuva
2022	Alytus	Leipalingis	Nemakščiai		Sangrūda	Panemunėlis	Šakyna	Bijotai	Alsėdžiai	Kavarskas	Vievis
2023	Tauragė	Marcinkonys	Kulautuva		Baraginė	Pačeriaukštė I			Plateliai		
2024	Kaišiadorys				Višakio Rūda	Kamajai			Ryškėnai	Dubingiai	Onuškis
2025	Druskininkai			Dreverna; Švėkšna	Kudirkos Naumiestis		Žeimelis				Rudamina
2026	Kėdainiai										
2027	Pasvalys										
2028	Zarasai										
