= France–Lithuania relations =

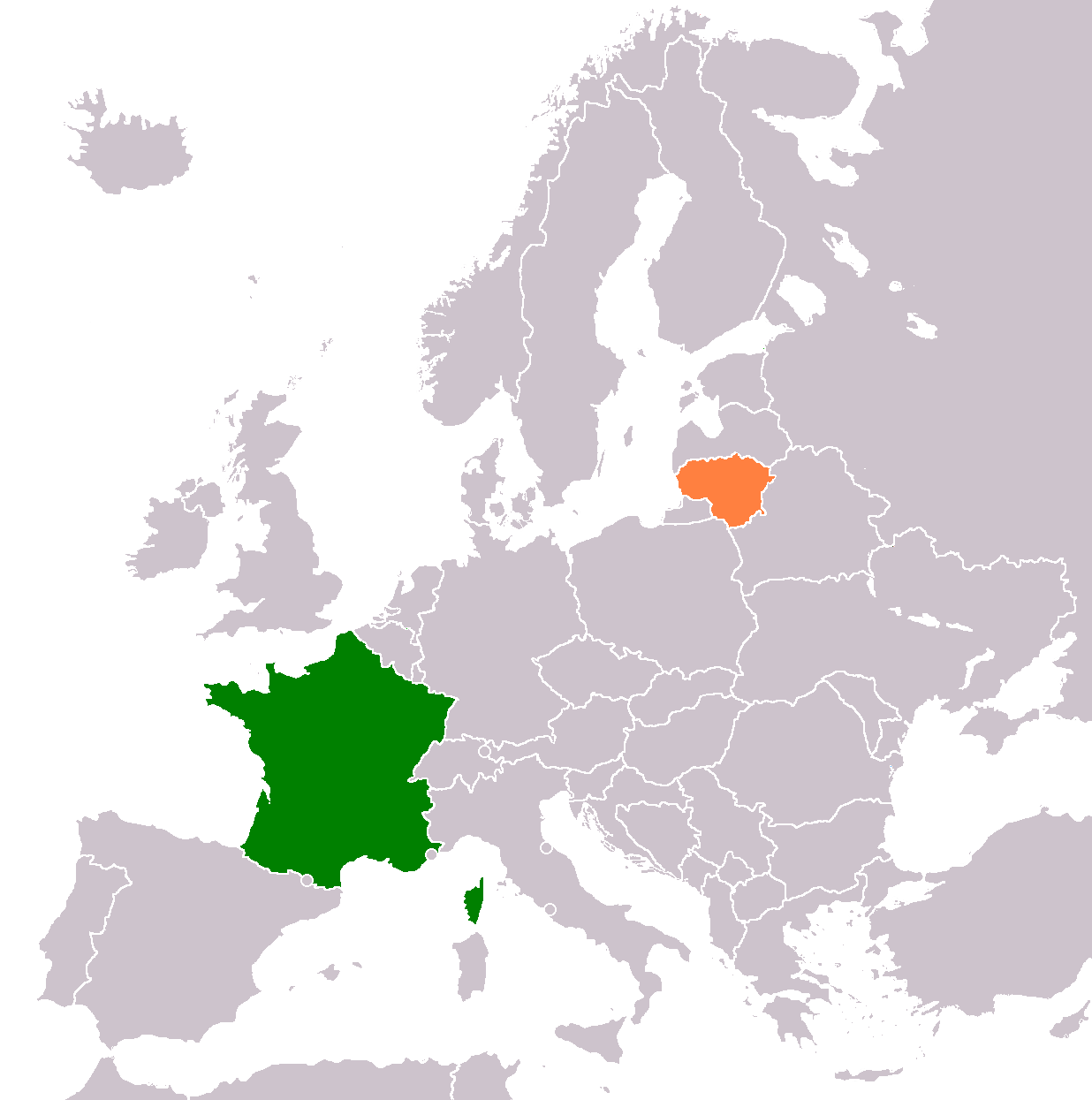

- France: Lithuania

France–Lithuania relations are the bilateral relations between France and Lithuania. Both countries are full members of the Council of Europe, European Union, NATO and the Eurozone.

== History ==
=== First contacts in the early period and during the Grand Duchy of Lithuania ===
French relations with Lithuania began in the 14th century, when the French king Charles IV the Fair was informed that the Grand Duke of Lithuania Gediminas intended to be baptized. The French king was informed about this by the Pope John XXII residing in Avignon, with whom Gediminas corresponded in 1322–1324.

French knights were in the ranks of the Teutonic Order that attacked Lithuania, including the attack on Pilėnai Castle, as well as in the Crusades of 1391, 1392 and 1394. The crusade of 1394 was led by the Duke of Burgundy Philip II the Brave.

=== Relations during the ATR era ===
In the 16th–17th centuries, in an effort to weaken the Holy Roman Empire, France tried to prevent the Polish–Lithuanian Commonwealth from rapprochement with the Austrian Habsburgs, France forged dynastic kinship ties with the rulers of the Polish–Lithuanian Commonwealth and nominated its candidates for its throne. As a result, the French princes Henry of Valois (reigned 1573–1574) and François Louis de Conti (1697, but never took the throne) were elected rulers of the Polish–Lithuanian Commonwealth. Henry of Valois is also known for the fact that the Vytis sign is on the clock tower of the Palace of Justice thanks to him. Later, representatives of the younger Bourbons branch often unsuccessfully applied for the throne. In September 1733, Stanisław Leszczynski, supported by French diplomats, was elected ruler of the ATR.

King Henry of Valois is buried in the Church of Saint-Dionysius in Paris, and the heart of John Casimir Vasa is buried in the Church of Saint-Germain-des-Prés. The mausoleum depicts a battle between Poles and Lithuanians against the Cossacks.

In the 17th–18th centuries, pro-Pranciscan political groups (Pacs, and for some time in the 18th century, the Potocks) formed in the ATR.

At the end of the 18th century, the French Revolution influenced the public life and reforms of the ATR, the ideals of which influenced the Constitution of the Third of May.

As early as the 19th century, At the beginning of the 19th century, French surnames (Lautrec, de Choiseul-Gufje) were found in Lithuanian birth records, which proves that due to various circumstances, individual French people lived in the lands of the Grand Duchy of Lithuania. Lithuanian genealogist Rimvydas Butautas-Kudirka derives the Kudirka surname from an alien from Southern France who settled in Prussia in the 17th century (from the French Couderc, which in turn comes from the Occitan coderc, meaning meadow, grove).

=== Relations when Lithuania was part of the Russian Empire ===
In 1797, the University of Vilnius began teaching French language and literature.

Napoleon created the Duchy of Warsaw in 1807–1815, and the Lithuanian Transnemunė belonged to it. Meanwhile, Lithuania Minor was occupied as early as the end of 1806. The French surrendered to the French on 16 June 1807. After the capture of Königsberg, the Prussian king Frederick William III with his wife Louise and children arrived in Klaipėda via the Curonian Spit, which became the temporary capital of Prussia in 1807–1808 years.

In June–December 1812, Greater Lithuania was occupied by the army of Napoleon I – it was French time. The Grand Duchy of Lithuania was restored with the capital Vilnius, and the Lithuanian population initially welcomed the French army as liberators. There was also a Lithuanian regiment in Napoleon's army, one of the most prominent members of which was the poet Silvestras Teofilis Valiūnas. On 14 July 1812, the lands of the Grand Duchy of Lithuania were formally annexed to the Duchy of Warsaw. After France lost the campaign to Russia in 1812 On 8–10 December, about 50,000 retreating French soldiers gathered in Vilnius and its surroundings, the vast majority of whom (about 37,000–40,000) died of hunger and disease by the beginning of 1813 and were buried here – such places are called French cemeteriess. The cemetery in Šilainiai has survived to this day; There were also cemeteries in the Jurbarkas area, Vilnius Northern town.

In 1832 the famous poet and writer Adam Mickiewicz moved to Paris. His poem Vėlinės George Sand was translated into French. After the unsuccessful uprisings of 1831 and 1863, Lithuanian nobles fled to France in search of political asylum. Some of them later became members of the Lithuanian society "Želmuo" founded in 1886 by Mikalojus Akelaitis, which maintained ties with Lithuanian gymnasiums, and later – with the social democratic party.

1870–1871 In the war, French prisoners of war who were captured contributed to the excavation of the King Wilhelm (now Klaipėda) Canal section from Dreverna to Malku īlanka.

=== Relations 1918–1940 ===
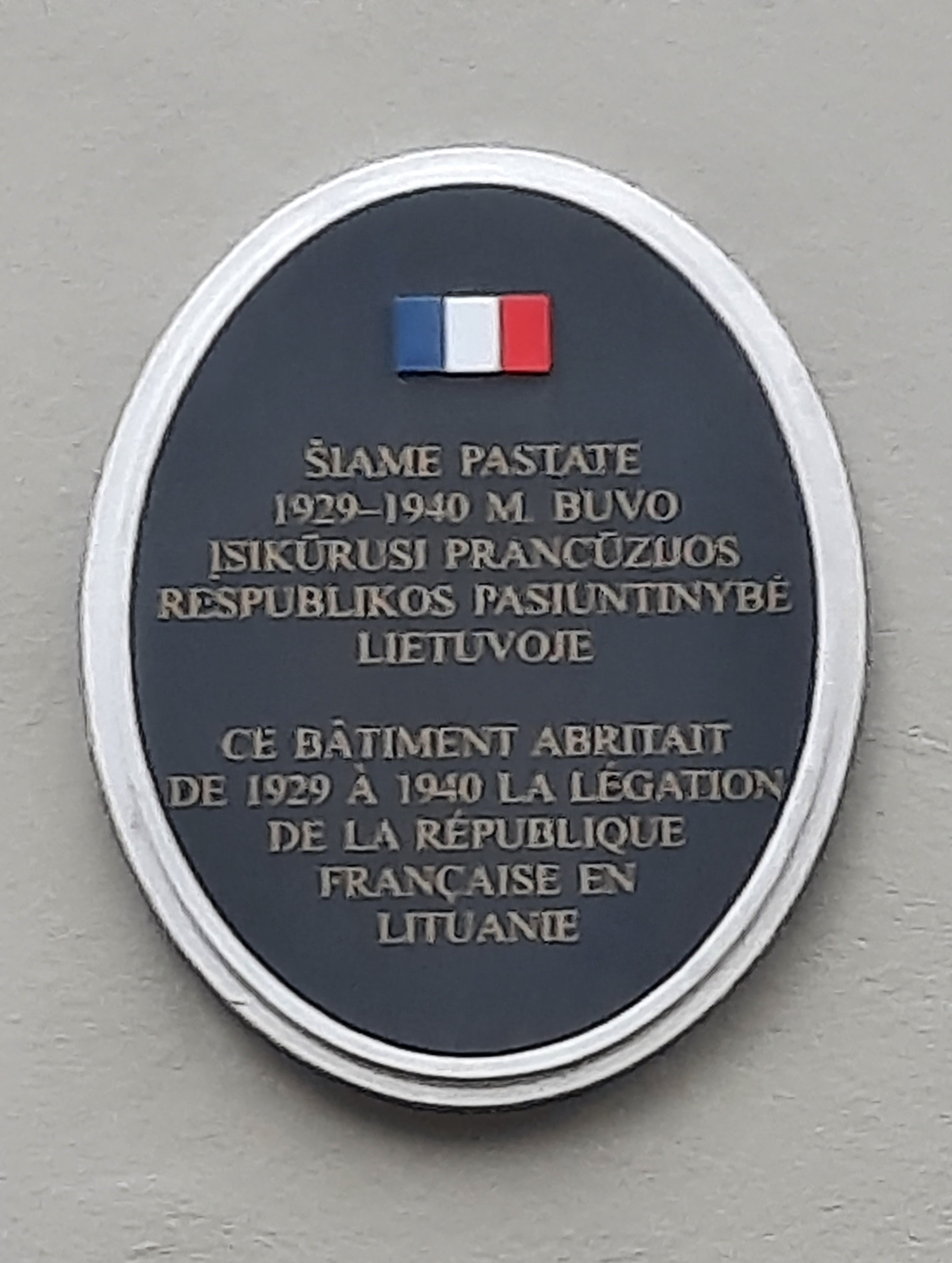
Memorial plaque of the embassy in Kaunas, Putvinskio st.

The first contacts between Lithuania and France were established back in the fall of 1918, and the 1919 Versailles peace conference featured a Lithuanian delegation under Oskaras Milašius. France pronounced de jure recognition of Lithuania on 20 December 1922, becoming a key political partner to the state of Lithuania of the period.

The French military mission in Kaunas (merged with the French military mission in Riga in 1921) was the first official representative office of the Entente countries in Lithuania. On 11 May 1920, Lithuania's independence was recognized de facto by France. In the same year, the Lithuanian mission began operating in Paris. Meanwhile, de jure France recognized it during the Ambassadors' Conference on 20 December 1922. Initially, there was tension between the states over the Klaipėda region and Vilnius. France was entrusted with the administration of Klaipėda region from January 1920, which it intended to declare the Klaipėda Free State. France was one of Poland's main allies in Western Europe, so it tried to reconcile the conflicting Lithuania and Poland. In December 1923, In January 1917, during the Klaipėda Revolt, battles took place between French soldiers under the Klaipėda Commissioner Gabriel Jean Petisné and Lithuanian activists, during which two Frenchmen and twelve Lithuanians were killed. As a result of the negotiations between the Ambassadors on 17 January, sovereignty rights in the Klaipėda region were transferred to the Republic of Lithuania.

In 1924, a French representative office was established in Kaunas (operated until 1940), as well as a consulate. From 1929 to 1940, the French legation rented a building at V. Putvinskio gatvė No. 14. Envoys extraordinary and ministers plenipotentiary René Ristelhueber and Georges Ferdinand Charles Dulong resided here. In 2013, a commemorative plaque was unveiled on the building during the Francophonie Days held in Kaunas.

In 1928 several bilateral agreements were signed between the states: a consular convention, an extradition treaty, a convention on judicial custody and assistance, the transmission of judicial acts and orders for questioning in civil and commercial cases, and a temporary agreement on trade relations. In 1930, an agreement was reached on the protection of trademarks. In the 1930s, France was Lithuania's 6th largest foreign trade partner. Until 1934, imports exceeded exports in the trade balance, but from 1935, Lithuanian exports to France began to increase and significantly exceeded imports. There was also cooperation in the fields of war and politics, and the Lithuanian army was also armed with weapons purchased in France.

Close cultural cooperation was also established between the countries – a department of romance philology was established at Kaunas University, a Lithuanian-French society was established, and Lithuanians were given opportunities to study and do internships at French universities. Lithuanian writers translated French literature into Lithuanian in large numbers. 1923 a Lithuanian-French society was active in Kaunas.

The French writer Žanas Mokleras visited pre-war Lithuania several times and wrote several books about Lithuania, including – Panorama of Lithuanian Literature (Paris, Sagittaire, 1938). A student of the Sorbonne, the famous linguist Žoržas Matorė was invited to Kaunas University to teach French, and lived in Lithuania almost until the beginning of World War II. He left behind memories of Lithuania.

=== Relations during the occupation of Lithuania ===
During the times of Soviet occupation, Lithuania did not have an official mission to France, even though individual persons were allowed to act in an emissary capacity.

On 2 June 1940, the Third Reich occupying France closed the Lithuanian legation; Lithuanian diplomats were forced to evacuate and leave for the southern part of France. Less than 2 weeks later, Lithuania was occupied by the Soviet Union. France adhered to a policy of non-recognition of the occupation and Lithuanian representatives were issued diplomatic credentials by the French Ministry of Foreign Affairs, although they were not included in the official lists of diplomats or invited to official receptions. Lithuania had its representative in France until 1960, as well as in the period 1989–1990.

According to the military attaché service of the French Embassy in Lithuania, 41 French and Belgian prisoners of war who escaped from concentration camps set up in Prussia during World War II may have been buried in the Klaipėda city cemetery. About 15–16 French prisoners of war who died or were killed were buried in the cemeteries of towns and villages in Klaipėda, Šilutė and Tauragė counties.

After Lithuania was reoccupied by the Soviet Union, part of the Lithuanian cultural elite fled to France, actively contributing to cultural and academic life there. Notable ones are Jurgis Baltrušaitis, Jurgis Baltrušaitis. Jurgis Savickis, Algirdas Julius Greimas. In 1944 the Lithuanian Relief Society was founded, reorganized into the Lithuanian Community of France in 1947. Joseph Kessel, Emmanuel Levinas, Romain Gary, Oscar Milosz, who had previously left Lithuania, also worked in France. Since 1950 the Polish-Lithuanian writer Czesław Miłosz has lived in France, where he wrote one of his most famous works, Pavergtą protą.

During the Soviet period, the teaching of French language and literature continued at Vilnius University and some other higher and secondary schools. Although French literature continued to be translated, the absolute majority of the writers translated were classics or authors conforming to the canons of socialist realism. Among the translators, Aleksys Churginas stood out, while Juozas Miltinis in 1979 staged the play Requiem for a Nun based on V. Faulkner and Camus. According to Thierry Laurent, a scholar who has studied Lithuanian-French relations, "during the thirty years of post-war Soviet occupation, Lithuanian-French relations significantly diminished, became completely accidental or went underground".

Although France did not de jure recognize the Soviet occupation, at least two French citizens considered to be loyal to the Soviet government had visited Lithuania. This happened in 1965 when French philosophers Jean-Paul Sartre and Simona de Beauvoir (more details Jean-Paul_Sartre#Ž._Sartre_and_Lithuania) visited Soviet Lithuania for five days. During their trip to Neringa, photographer Antanas Sutkus took Lithuania's best-known photo of Ž. P. Sartre, "Sartre fights the wind in the Curonian Spit".

=== Relations after 1991 ===
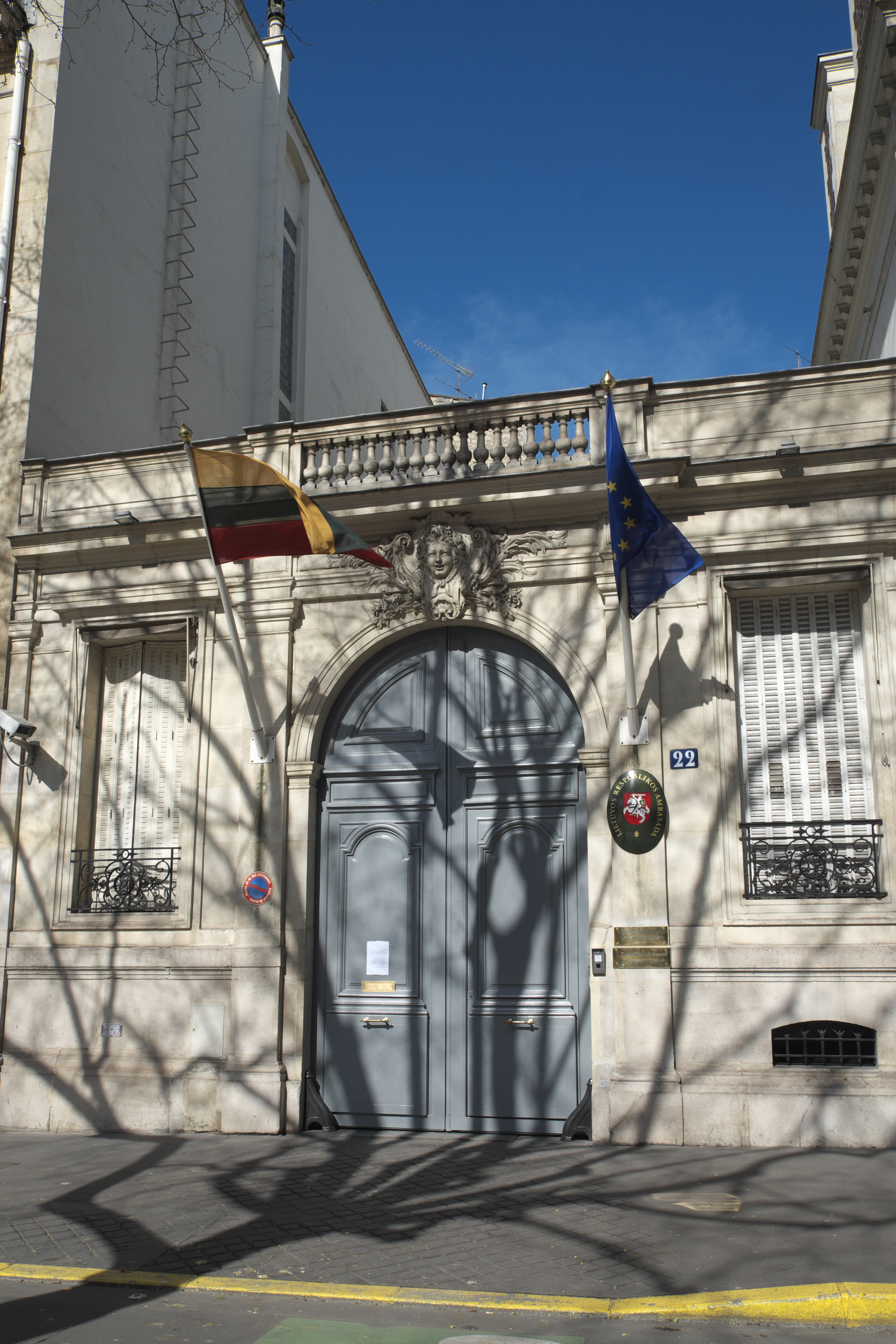
Lithuanian Embassy in Paris 2020

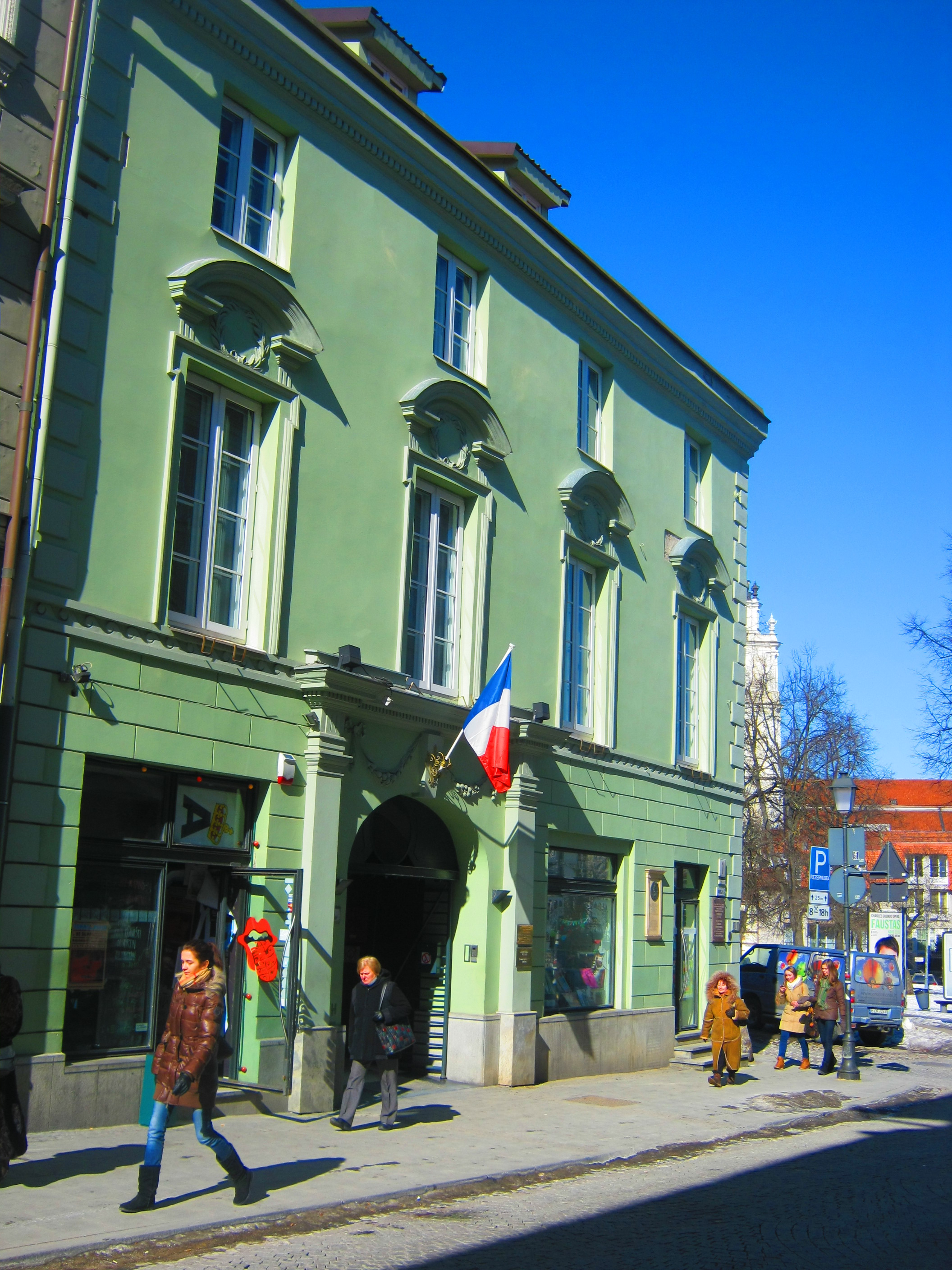
French Embassy and French Cultural Center in Vilnius 2013

On 20 June 1991, French President François Mitterrand and the Speakers of both Houses of Parliament received Vytautas Landsbergis during his first official visit to France. France recognized Lithuania de jure on 25 August becoming one of the first Western countries to do so. On 29 August 1991, relations between the two countries were restored. On 15 May 1992, F. Mitterrand became the first Western head of state and the first French President to pay an official visit to Lithuania. The French government preserved Lithuanian gold deposited in the country's banks during the interwar period and compensated for the loss of its embassy building. The diplomatic relations were resumed on 29 August 1991.

In 1994, Lithuania joined the Paris Convention, signed in 2016 and ratified the Paris Agreement.

Since 1999, Lithuania is an observer on the Francophonie.

The following bilateral agreements are in force between the countries: Treaty of Amity, Friendship and Cooperation (1992), Protocol on the Establishment of a Stock Exchange (1992), Agreement on the Appointment of a Temporary Technical Advisor (1993), Financial Protocol (1994), Agreement on the International Carriage of Goods by Road (1994), Agreement on the Avoidance of Double Taxation on Income and Capital and on Fiscal Abuses (1997), Agreement on the Return of Illegally Staying Persons (1998), Agreement on the Abolition of the Visa Regime (1999), Agreement on the Status of the Building of the Diplomatic Mission of the Republic of Lithuania in Paris (2001), Agreement on Cooperation in the Fields of Culture, Education, Science, Technology and Engineering (2003), Agreement on the Exchange of Classified Information and the Protection of Classified Information (signed in 2009, ratified in 2010), an agreement on joint film production (2015) and an agreement on cooperation in the field of defence and security (2013)

At the end of July 2001, the President of France Jacques Chirac paid an official visit to Lithuania.

Lithuanian-French relations intensified further after Lithuania became a member of the EU and NATO. In 2020, French President Emmanuel Macron visited Lithuania. In 2021, in response to France's request, Lithuania sent 30 volunteer soldiers to Mali.

== Educational, scientific, sports and technological exchanges and cultural cooperation ==
On 19 October 2017, a cooperation agreement was signed between the Embassy of France in Lithuania, Klaipėda City Municipality and Klaipėda University, the aim of which is to develop cultural cooperation, exchange and share a common historical memory.

French is one of the most popular foreign languages in Lithuania. In 2008–2010 According to a study by Vilnius University, the number of people who speak French in Lithuanian cities reached 5.26%, and in Palanga, Pasvalys, Kupiškis and Trakai, at least one fifth speak the language. Lithuania is an observer of the Francophonie. French literature began to be translated into Lithuanian at the end of the 19th century. Translated works by Guy de Maupassant, Prosper Mérimée, Émile Zola, Anatole France.. Meanwhile, in 1858, translations of several Lithuanian folk songs were published in the journal Revue contemporaine, and in 1869 Revue des deux mondes Prosper Mérimée published the novella "Lokis", which takes place in Lithuania.

The following organizations are active in Lithuania, contributing to the spread of the French language in Lithuania:

- French Cultural Center at the French Embassy in Vilnius
- Lithuanian-French Association
- Lithuanian-French Chamber of Commerce, Francophonie Business Forum
- Association of French Language Teachers and Lecturers
- Francophone Student Club "CLEF" (Cercle Lituanien des Étudiants Francophones)
- Lithuanian Branch of "Union presse francophone"
- Francophone Studies Center at Mykolas Riomer University
- Šiauliai University French Cultural Center
- Vilnius International French Lyceum

Lithuanian and French men's football teams have played four matches against each other by 2021 December. The French team won all of them. There have also been several meetings between the Lithuanian and French men's basketball teams. Some of the most notable meetings are the 2003 European Basketball Championship semi-finals (Lithuanian victory) and the 2013 European Basketball Championship final (French victory).

The women's basketball team has also played several matches against the French national team. One of the most promising Lithuanian basketball players, Justė Jocytė, has been playing in the French major league since December 2019.

== Economic relations ==
In 2020, trade turnover between Lithuania and France reached 1.68 billion euros, and France was the 12th largest trading partner of Lithuania.

Imports from France to Lithuania dominate the trade balance.

- Exports amount to 717 million euros; and France is the 14th largest export partner
- Imports amount to 963 million euros; France is the tenth largest import partner. The most imported goods are land vehicles, their parts and accessories, cosmetics, perfumery, machinery and mechanical equipment, non-alcoholic and alcoholic beverages, electrical machinery and equipment and their parts, pharmaceutical products, etc.

France is 12th in terms of foreign direct investment in Lithuania (investments amount to 551.86 million euros). In turn, the amount of Lithuanian direct investment abroad in France in 2020 was 27.54 million euros. euros (13th place by volume).

== High level visits ==
=== High-level visits from France to Lithuania ===
- In May 1992, President François Mitterrand became the first Western leader to visit Lithuania after the restoration of diplomatic relations.
- In 2001, President Jacques Chirac paid an official visit
- In September 2011 French Prime Minister François Fillon visited Vilnius.
- On 28–29 November 2013, President François Hollande travelled to Vilnius where he participated in the Eastern Partnership Summit.
- On 28–29 September 2020, President Emmanuel Macron travelled to Vilnius and met with President Gitanas Nausėda and Belarusian Opposition Leader Sviatlana Tsikhanouskaya.
- On 11–12 July 2023, President Emmanuel Macron travelled to Vilnius to attend the 33rd NATO summit.

=== High-level visits from Lithuania to France ===
- In September 2009 Lithuanian President Dalia Grybauskaitė was received in the French Parliament by the French President.
- On 29–30 November 2021, President Gitanas Nausėda travelled to Paris and talks with President Emmanuel Macron
- On 10–11 March 2022, President Gitanas Nausėda travelled to Versailles, Yvelines and participated in the informal meeting of the European Council.
- On 25–26 May 2023, President Gitanas Nausėda travelled to Paris and have reception and talks with President Emmanuel Macron
- On 26 July 2024, President Gitanas Nausėda travelled to Paris to attend the 2024 Summer Olympics opening ceremony.
- On 27 March 2025, President Gitanas Nausėda attended a meeting of the "Coalition of the willing" in Paris hosted by President Macron.

== Resident diplomatic missions ==
- France has an embassy in Vilnius.
- Lithuania has an embassy in Paris and 5 honorary consulates (in Bordeaux, Marseille, Rouen, Troyes and Valence).

== See also ==
- Foreign relations of France
- Foreign relations of Lithuania
