= Euromissile Crisis =

Crisis in the late Cold War

- Part of the Cold War
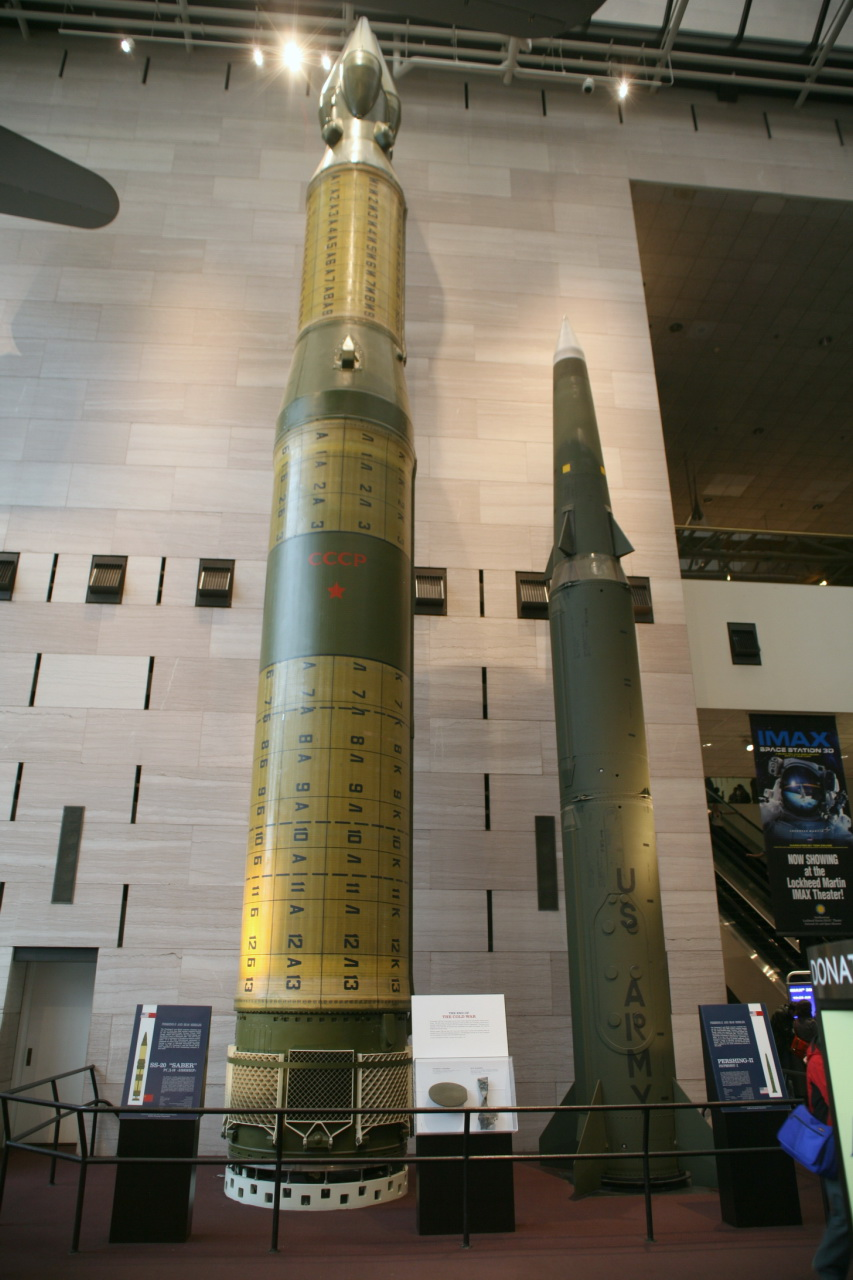
- SS-20 and Pershing II missiles, two of the main missiles involved within this crisis, on display in the National Air and Space Museum in Washington DC, United States.
| Date | Late 1970s to late 1980s |
| Location | Europe, North America |

Belligerents
| NATO | USSR | Pacifist, left-wing and anti-nuclear protestors |

The Euromissile Crisis, also known as the INF affair, was a crisis during the Cold War, which is widely held the Soviet Union began deploying SS-20 missiles to Eastern Europe in the late 1970s. In response to the crisis, the North Atlantic Treaty Organization (NATO) began developing the Double-Track Decision, to either negotiate the Soviet missiles out of Europe or to bring in American missiles to counterbalance the Soviets'. In response to NATO's plan, pacifist protests spread across several European nations. The crisis would also eventually lead to the signing of the Intermediate-Range Nuclear Forces Treaty (INF Treaty) in 1987.

== Background ==
In 1972, the Soviet Union and United States signed the first Strategic Arms Limitation Talks (SALT I) as part of the Détente policies of both superpowers They would then sign SALT II in 1979. The agreements created restrictions on missiles with a range greater than 5,500 kilometres (3,400 mi). In a speech to the International Institute for Strategic Studies in October 1977, the German Chancellor Helmut Schmidt argued that SALT could leave Europe undefended by the United States. Harold Brown, the United States Secretary of Defense, stated that NATO operations would not decrease due to SALT.

Among the Western Bloc, France had withdrawn from NATO's unified command structure in 1966. NATO leadership also became concerned that Détente could not replace military build-up and that the United States could no longer defend Europe.

== Deployment and negotiations ==
In March 1976, the Soviet Union began deploying the SS-20 missile in Europe. The missile was stealthy, medium-range (compliant with SALT), and relatively accurate compared to its predecessors. The missile also used solid fuel, instead of liquid fuel, and carried three warheads. Tupolev Tu-22M bombers were also being deployed and threatening Western Europe; the United States did not see it as an intercontinental bomber. The Soviets attempted to prevent more weapons from reaching Europe through threats, negotiations, and exploiting the West's internal fighting.

The US Carter Administration was initially hesitant to deploying missiles in Europe to counter the Soviets. US President Jimmy Carter was also hesitant towards the neutron bomb. More generally, deploying weapons was viewed as a possible destabilizer to Détente. NATO's heads of states assembled in Washington, D.C., in 1978 to improve military capabilities and expand military spending by 3% annually. In January 1979, Jimmy Carter, Helmut Schmidt, French President Valéry Giscard d'Estaing, and British Prime Minister James Callaghan met in Guadeloupe to discuss the crisis. Schmidt offered to host long-range theater nuclear forces in Germany in the conference. On October 9, Leonid Brezhnev proposed in a speech in East Berlin to remove some of the missiles from the western Soviet Union if NATO did not deploy more missiles in Europe.

In December 1979, NATO adopted the double-track policy, with one method of resolution being through negotiations and the other was deploying American ground-launched cruise and Pershing II missiles if negotiations failed. The decision was unanimous. The Prime Ministers of the Netherlands and Norway and the Foreign Minister of Denmark traveled to Washington to promote negotiation over deployment. At the end of 1980, Carter lost the 1980 United States presidential election and became a lame duck.

In 1981, US President Ronald Reagan proposed to the Soviet Union that he would remove the entire deployment if the Soviets removed their SS-4, SS-5, and SS-20 missiles. In 1983, the Double-Track policy was implemented. By late 1985, 108 Pershing II launchers were deployed under the second track. There were 464 ground-launched cruise missiles hosted in Belgium, the Netherlands, Italy, West Germany, and the United Kingdom. The United States spent $10 billion on the deployment. France did not support the decision militarily.

In Greece, according to historians Eirini Karamouzi and Dionysios Chourchoulis, Prime Minister Andreas Papandreou used the crisis to renegotiate American bases in the country.

== Protests ==
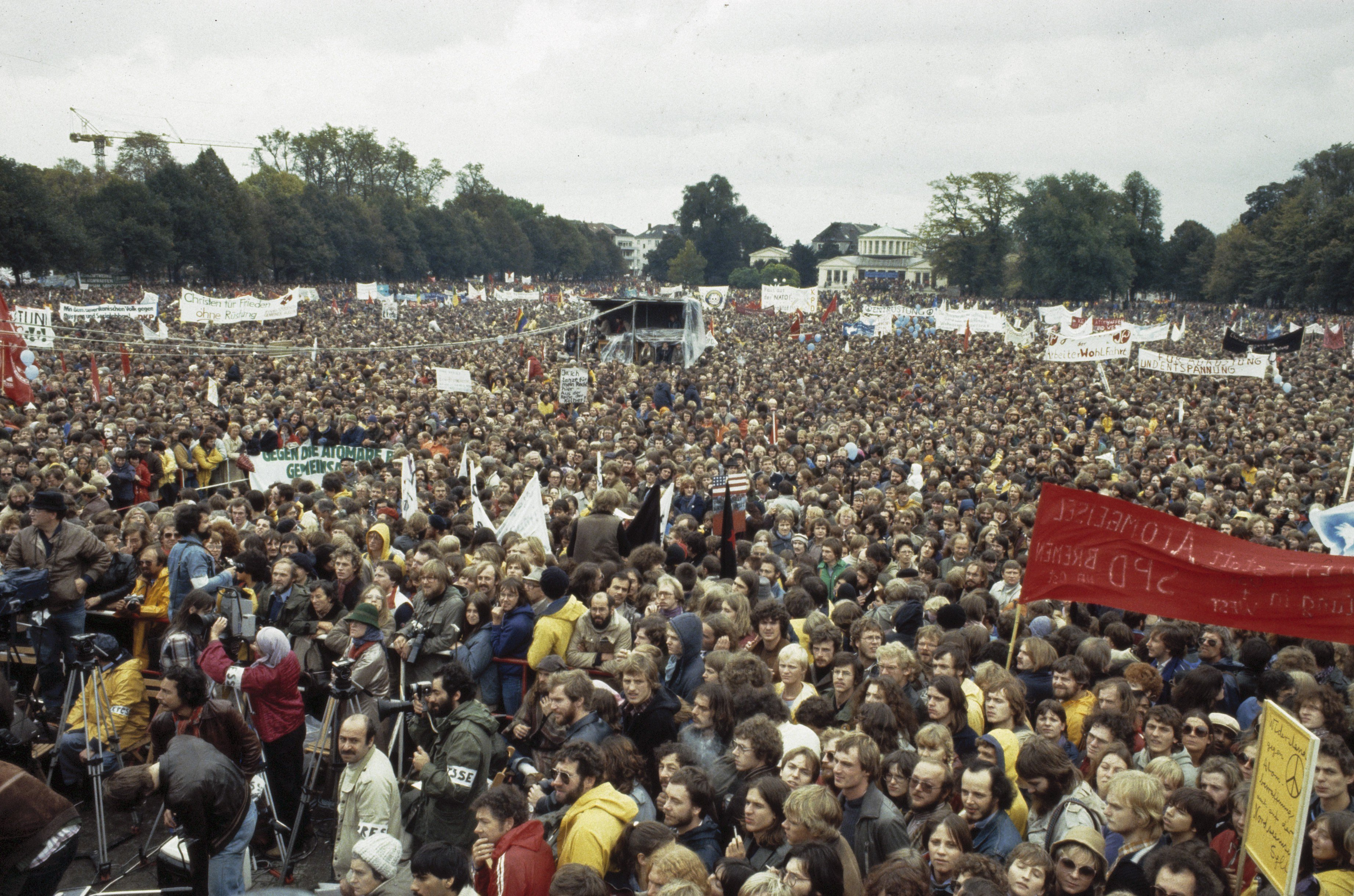
Protests in Bonn in 1981

Public opinion towards the deployment of more nuclear weapons in Europe began to become increasingly negative as fears of nuclear war rose during the late 1970s. Simultaniously, the Soviet Union pursued a propaganda campaign in Western media, framing the double decision as a provocation and act of aggression.

From 1981 to 1983, protests broke out across Belgium, Italy, the Netherlands, West Germany, and the United Kingdom against American and NATO influence as well as nuclear proliferation. Opposition was highest in West Germany, where any future conflict would likely be fought. In October 1981, around 250,000 Germans protested in Bonn. These demonstrations were the largest West Germany had experienced up to that point. Schmidt's government opposed the protests, calling them a "declaration of war".

Left-leaning parties generally supported decreasing influence from the Americans. In France, the involvement of the French Communist Party worked to discredit their respective peace movements. According to the Project on Nuclear Issues, non-nuclear weapon wielding government leaders felt that they could not publicly support introducing American missiles to their nations.

Against the backdrop of the Euromissile Crisis, the "Six Nation Initiative" was launched in May 1984 by Greece, together with India, Argentina, Mexico, Tanzania, and Sweden. The group emerged as a diplomatic effort by non-aligned states seeking to promote arms control, reduce the risk of nuclear escalation in Europe, and encourage renewed dialogue between the major Cold War blocs.

== Aftermath ==
The Euromissile Crisis is described as starting a Second Cold War, a new period of heightened tensions between the superpowers.

The Social Democratic Party of Germany's lack of support for the double-track decision led to their coalition breaking in 1982 after the Free Democratic Party began coalitioning with CDU/CSU. The party would stay out of power until 1998. This was influenced by the Green Party gaining support from protestors against nuclear weaponry. According to Jeffrey Herf, the aftermath of the Euromissile Crisis would lead to reforms under Mikhail Gorbachev. The double-track policy led to further negotiations that culminated to the signing of the INF Treaty. The INF Treaty marked the end of hostilities and tensions related to the Euromissile Crisis.

== See also ==
- Cuban Missile Crisis
