= France–Luxembourg relations =

- France: Luxembourg

Diplomatic mission
- Embassy of France, Luxembourg: Embassy of Luxembourg, Paris

France and the Luxembourg maintain bilateral relations, and share a land border. Both nations are members of the Council of Europe, European Union, NATO, OECD and the United Nations.

== History ==
=== Early relations ===
In the Middle Ages, Luxembourg was a state within the Holy Roman Empire, in which the House of Luxembourg played an important role. After their coronation as emperors, the House of Luxembourg began to neglect their ancestral lands, which were conquered by Philip the Good in 1443. In the late Middle Ages and early modern period, Luxembourg was mostly under the rule of the Burgundians and Habsburgs, with French influence being noticeable and French became the predominant administrative language in Luxembourg in the 17th century. From the 16th century onwards, the duchy was repeatedly caught up in the rivalry between France and the Habsburg Netherlands, which made its strategically important fortress of Luxembourg a contested object. French troops repeatedly occupied parts of Luxembourg: they invaded the country in 1635/36 during the Thirty Years' War. In 1659, Luxembourg lost a portion of its territory to the Kingdom of France in the First Partition of Luxembourg and in 1684, Louis XIV conquered the city of Luxembourg before it was returned to the Spanish Habsburgs in 1698.

During the French Revolution, France finally annexed the whole of Luxembourg in 1795 and incorporated it into French territory as the Département Forêts (Forest Department). The introduction of conscription in Luxembourg triggered a peasant uprising (Klöppelkrieg) in 1798. It was not until Napoleon's fall in 1815 that Luxembourg regained its independence, now as a grand duchy in personal union with the United Kingdom of the Netherlands, but it remained a bone of contention between the major powers. Prussian troops were stationed in the fortress of Luxembourg to protect the country from a possible French attack. Luxembourg also joined the German Confederation.

=== Belgian revolution and Luxembourg crisis ===
After the Belgian Revolution of 1830, the major European powers – including France – finally decided on the second partition of Luxembourg. The western part of Luxembourg, with its predominantly French-speaking population, was ceded to Belgium in 1839 under the Treaty of London, while the remaining Grand Duchy retained its present borders. Luxembourg was thus effectively divided between French-influenced Belgium and the German sphere of influence, but retained its dynastic ties to the Netherlands until 1890. In 1867, France attempted to acquire Luxembourg from the Dutch king, which led to conflict with Prussia. The Luxembourg Crisis was ended by the Second Treaty of London of 1867: France renounced its claim to Luxembourg, Prussian troops withdrew and the Grand Duchy was declared neutral forever.

=== World wars ===
During the First World War, the German Empire marched through neutral Luxembourg in 1914 to attack France from the north, thereby violating Luxembourg's neutrality. Although Luxembourg remained officially neutral under German occupation, the Western powers accused the country of being too pro-German after the end of the war. Grand Duchess Maria-Adelheid had maintained close ties with Emperor Wilhelm II, while 3,000 Luxembourgers had joined the French Foreign Legion. Domestic unrest due to dissatisfaction with Maria-Adelheid even led to French troops having to intervene in Luxembourg in 1919 to end a republican coup attempt. In the same year, 73% of Luxembourgers voted in a referendum in favor of an economic union with France, but France rejected this and recommended that Luxembourg instead form close ties with Belgium. As a result, Luxembourg turned to Belgium for economic support (Belgian-Luxembourg Economic Union in 1921) and sought closer ties with France in the future, primarily within a multilateral framework.

Luxembourg and France were both invaded and occupied by Germany during World War II. Luxembourgers, alike French, were among the prisoners of the Natzweiler-Struthof concentration camp and its subcamps operated in German-occupied France. The Luxembourg government went into exile and worked from London with the Allies, including the Forces françaises libres led by Charles de Gaulle. In 1944, Allied troops – mainly US forces – liberated the Grand Duchy. Luxembourg then abandoned its strict neutrality and aligned its foreign policy closely with France and the Western Allies. This reorientation laid the foundation for Luxembourg's active role in the emerging post-war order in Europe.

=== Modern relations since 1945 ===
After 1945, France and Luxembourg enjoyed particularly close ties. Luxembourg was one of the founding members of the United Nations and NATO and closely integrated its security policy with France and its Western partners. In 1950, French Foreign Minister Robert Schuman (whose mother was from Luxembourg) initiated the plan to establish the European Coal and Steel Community, in which France and Luxembourg were involved from the outset. In 1957, both countries were among the six signatories of the Treaties of Rome establishing the European Economic Community (EEC). In the decades that followed, they further deepened their cooperation within the framework of European integration – a symbol of this is the Schengen Agreement, which was signed in 1985 in the Luxembourg border town of Schengen by France, Luxembourg, and neighboring countries and marked the beginning of the abolition of border controls. In 2002, both countries introduced the euro as their currency.

France and Luxembourg remain close partners within the EU to this day and frequently coordinate their foreign and European policies. Luxembourg is involved in multilateral missions (UN, NATO, EU) within the scope of its capabilities, often in cooperation with France. In 2010, a permanent Franco-Luxembourg government commission was established to deepen cooperation in the border region. It has met annually since then and has made important progress in areas such as transport, cross-border work (e.g., teleworking for commuters), health, and education. This close cooperation is underscored by regular state visits and government consultations.

== Economic relations ==
France and Luxembourg are closely linked economically, benefiting from the shared EU single market and the common currency, the euro. France is one of Luxembourg's most important trading partners: it is its third-largest supplier and second-largest market (as of 2022). Conversely, Luxembourg is a major investor in France through its financial sector; as a so-called transit country for capital, it was nominally the largest foreign investor in France in 2021. Many French companies – particularly banks, insurance companies, and retail chains – have a presence in Luxembourg. The labor market is particularly intertwined: in March 2023, Luxembourg had over 222,000 cross-border workers, more than half of whom (around 122,000) came from France. These French commuters play a central role in Luxembourg's economy. The governments of both countries work closely together to coordinate such cross-border economic issues, for example within the framework of the Greater Region of SaarLorLux and through agreements to promote infrastructure, transport, and regional development.

== Cultural relations ==
In addition to Luxembourgish and German, French is also an official language in Luxembourg; around 90% of the population speaks French, which underscores the country's close cultural ties to France. The Grand Duchy has been a member of the International Organization of La Francophonie since 1970. Cultural cooperation between France and Luxembourg was officially established by an agreement in 1954. In 2003, the French-German-Luxembourg Pierre Werner Institute, dedicated to cultural dialogue in Europe, opened in Luxembourg City. Thanks to cultural and linguistic similarities, there is also close cooperation in the fields of education and research.

== Diaspora ==
In 2021, just under 50,000 French nationals lived in Luxembourg, making them the second largest group of foreigners. Just under 1,000 Luxembourg nationals live in France.

== Resident diplomatic missions ==
- France has an embassy in Luxembourg City.
- Luxembourg has an embassy in Paris and a consulate-general in Strasbourg.
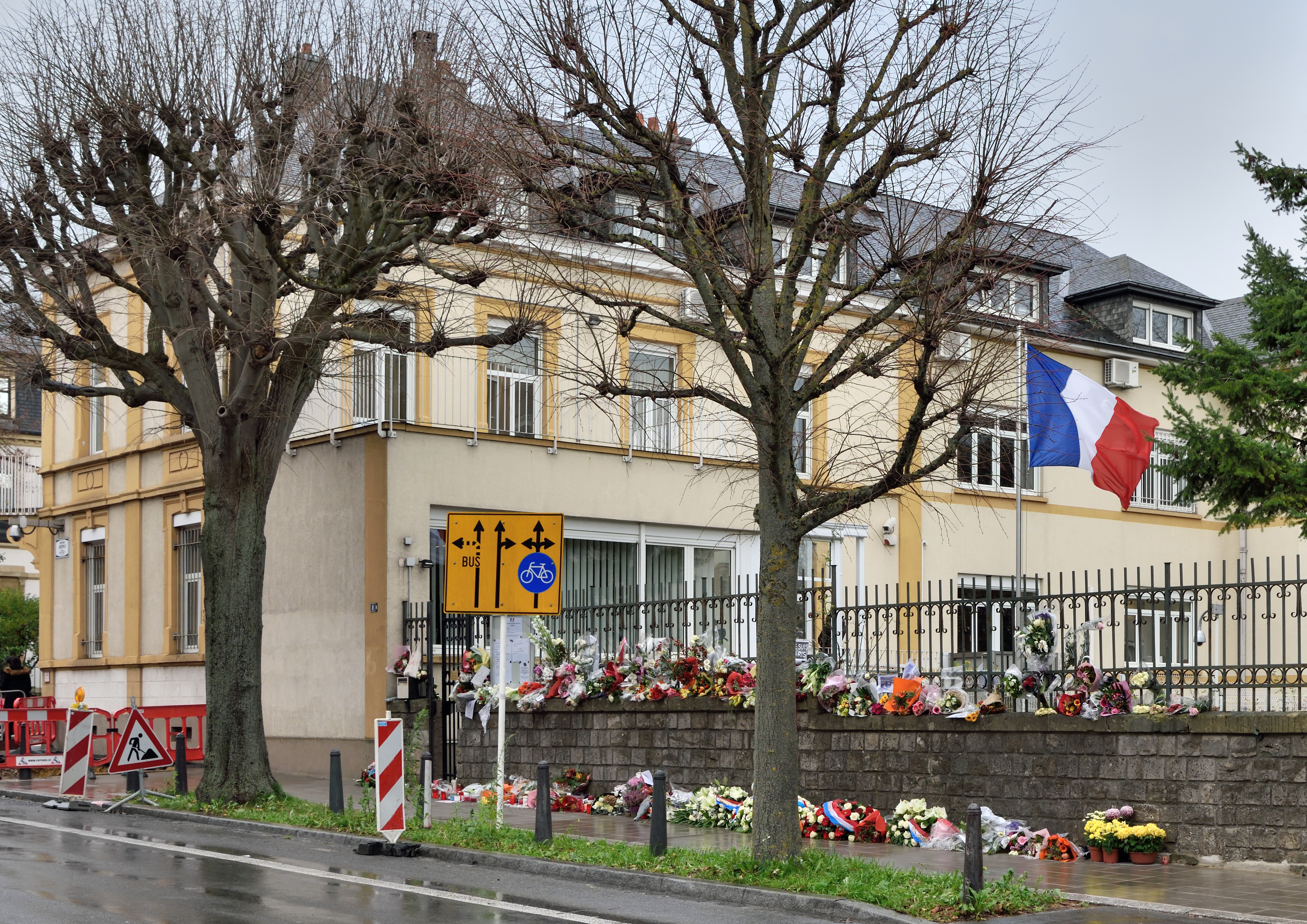
Embassy of France in Luxembourg City

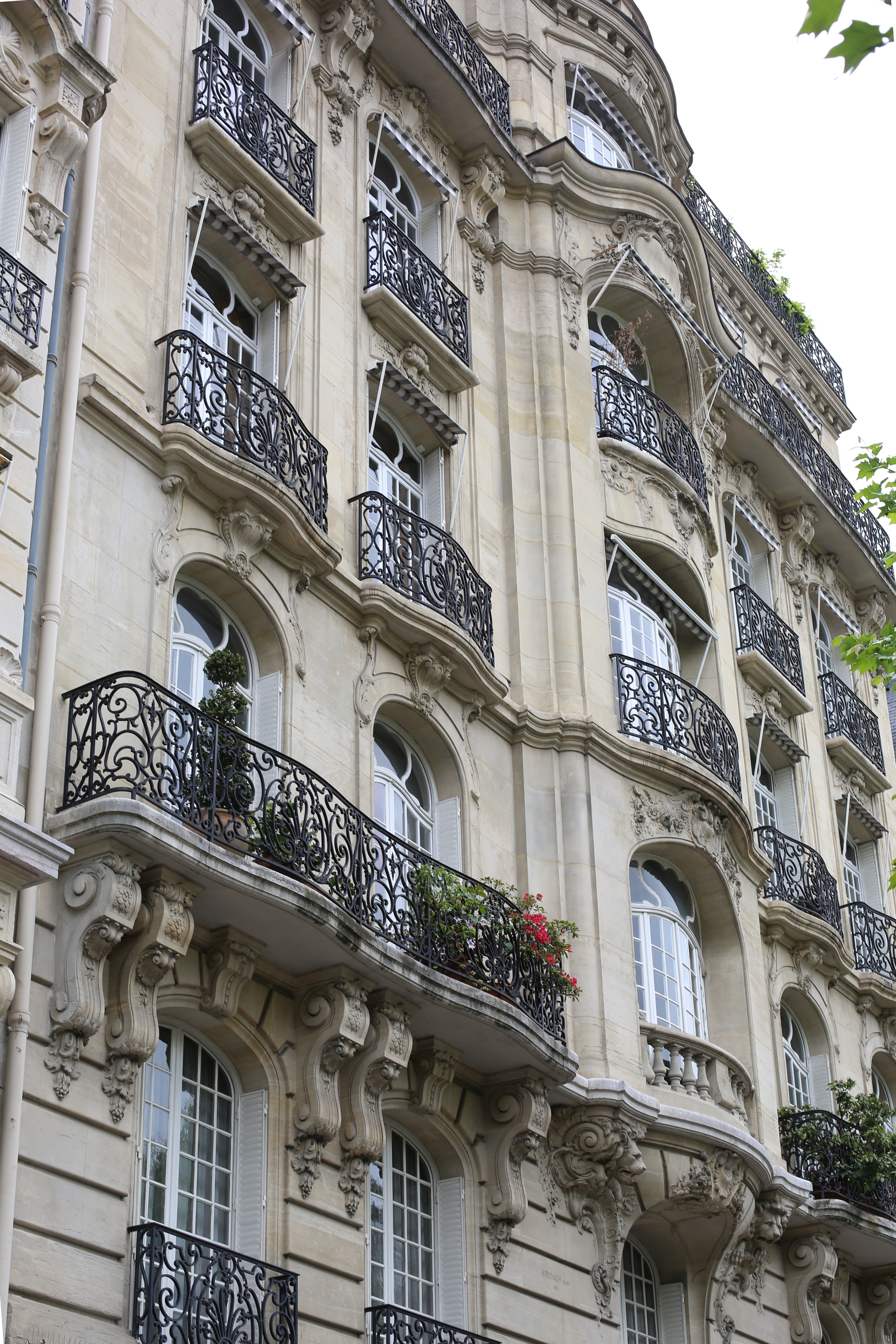
Embassy of Luxembourg in Paris

== See also ==
- Foreign relations of France
- Foreign relations of Luxembourg
- France–Luxembourg border
