= National capital of culture =

National capital of culture (Serbian: Национална престоница културе, Nacionalna prestonica kulture) is a program of the Ministry of Culture of the Republic of Serbia. The program was announced in 2021, and it was decided that Čačak will be the first to win the title of "capital of culture" in 2023. The current "capital of culture" is Užice, and in 2025, Zrenjanin takes over the title.

== History ==
In October 2021, a working group was created for the preparation and implementation of the "National Capital of Culture" program. On March 21, 2023, Čačak became the first "National capital of culture". On this occasion, a spectacle was held on the town square in Čačak. In the period March 2023-March 2024, numerous exhibitions, manifestations, concerts were held... Thanks to this program, Čačak was a destination for more than 230,000 visitors.

With the "train of culture" Čačak handed over the title of "capital of culture" to Užice.

== National capitals of culture ==
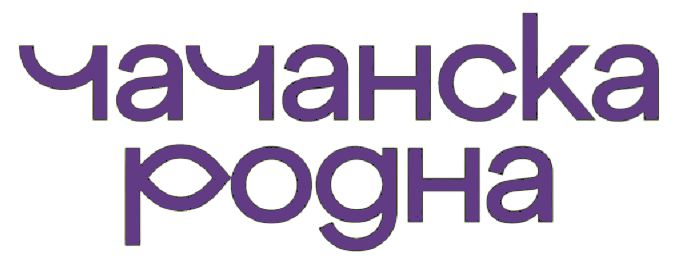
Logo of Čačanska rodna

Year	City	Slogan	Refs.
2023	Čačak	Čačanska rodna	
2024	Užice	Era kulture	
2025	Zrenjanin	Meandri grada – tokovi kulture	

== See also ==
- European Capital of Culture
