= Dreverna =

- Village
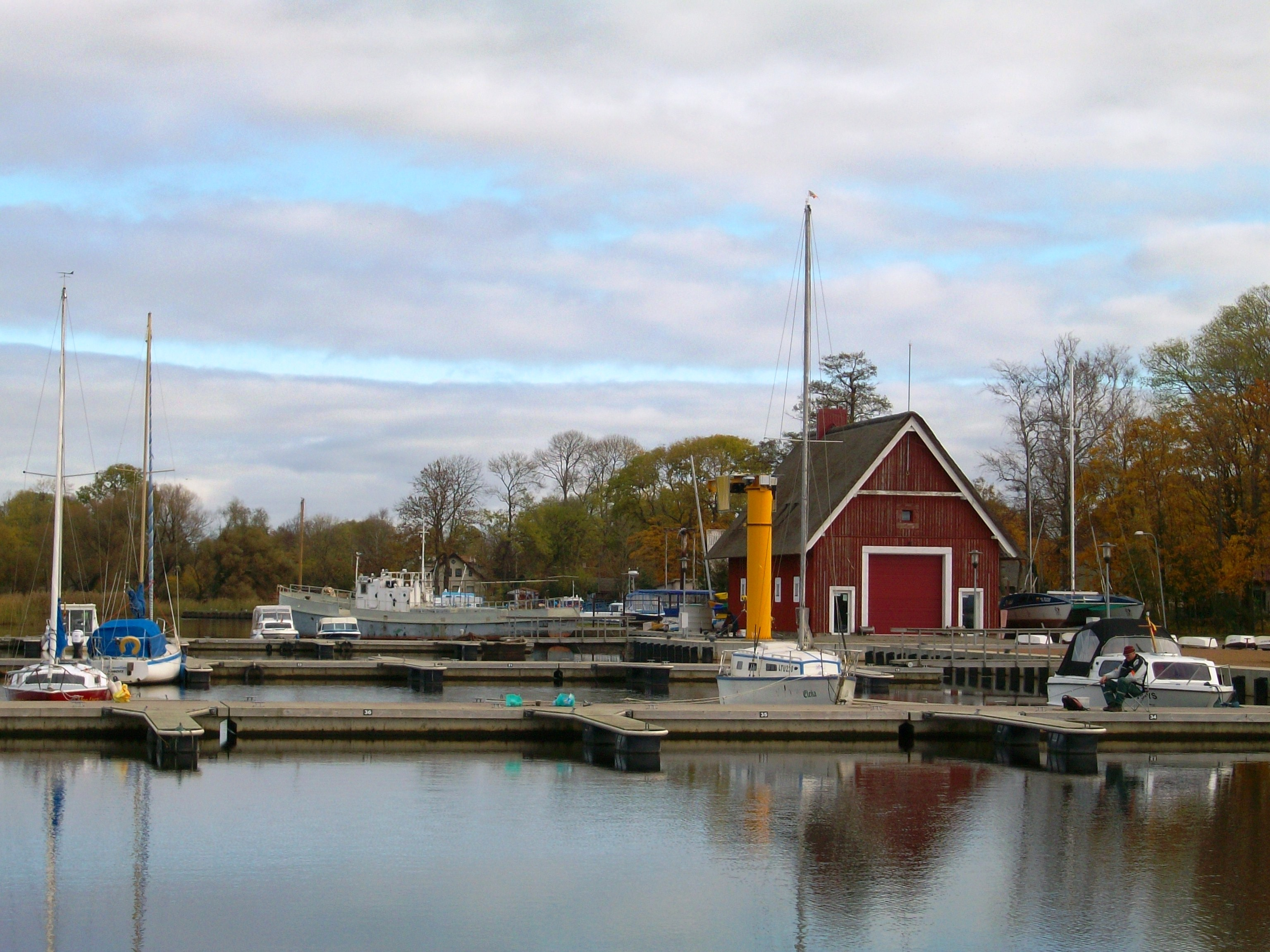
- Small boat pier in Dreverna.

- Location within Lithuania
- Coordinates: 55°31′01″N 21°14′49″E
- Country: Lithuania
- County: Klaipėda County
- Municipality: Klaipėda District Municipality
- Eldership: Priekulė Eldership

Population (2011)
  - Total: 530
- Time zone: UTC+2 (EET)
  - Summer (DST): UTC+3 (EEST)

Dreverna (German: Drawöhnen) is a village located in Klaipėda County of Lithuania, on the Dreverna river, southwest of the village is the Curonian Lagoon.

== History ==
Dreverna was first mentioned in the thirteenth century. Dreverna was an important trading centre, as it had a large fish market. During the Soviet occupation, the settlement was based around farming.

In 1898 a primary school was set up, and from 1951, the seventh year was included, in 1986 the eighth teaching year was included which formed the Dreverna High School.

The settlement was affected by the January 2007 tornado, where the village had a power failure, and there were heat supply disturbances.
