= Hartnett =

Hartnett may refer to:

== People ==
- Angela Hartnett (born 1969), British chef
- Gabby Hartnett (1900–1972), American baseball player and manager
- Jimmy Hartnett (1927–1988), Irish former professional footballer
- Josh Hartnett (born 1978), American actor
- Josie Hartnett (1927–2005), Irish sportsperson
- Kevin Hartnett (born 1984), Irish sportsperson
- Laurence Hartnett (1898–1986), engineer who made several important contributions to the Australian automotive industry
- Maurice A. Hartnett III (1927–2009), American judge from Delaware
- Michael Hartnett (1941–1999), an Irish poet
- P. P. Hartnett, (born 1958), Irish writer and photographer
- Paul Hartnett (1927–2022), American politician from Nebraska
- Sonya Hartnett (born 1968), Australian author
- Tim Hartnett (fl. 2020s), American politician from New Hampshire
- Thomas F. Hartnett (born 1941), American politician from South Carolina
- Will Ford Hartnett (born 1956), American politician from Texas
- William E. Hartnett (1919–2002), American politician and lawyer from Illinois
- William J. Hartnett (1932–2016), American politician and educator from Ohio

== Other uses ==
- Hartnett (car), an automobile produced in Australia from 1951 to 1955
- Hartnett House, predecessor to Bella Terra Publishing

== See also ==
- Harnett (disambiguation)
