= Propert =

Propert is a surname. Notable people with the surname include:

- John Propert (1793–1867), Welsh physician
- John Lumsden Propert (1834–1902), English physician and art critic, son of John Sr.
