= Warwick Charlton =

English journalist and public relations worker

Warwick Charlton (9 March 1918, Chelsea, London – 10 December 2002) was an English journalist and public relations worker.

== Life ==
A journalist's son, Warwick Charlton was educated at Epsom College. He took several reporting jobs on Fleet Street before the Second World War, during which (due to his journalistic experience) he served alongside American forces in North Africa as Field Marshal Montgomery's press officer (creating a more informal and popular public image for him), wrote Eighth Army News, campaigned for better pay for frontline troops and founded other service newspapers (all with relative freedom from censorship thanks to Montgomery's protection).

Postwar, he is best known as the English mover behind Project Mayflower and the construction of Mayflower II, as a commemoration of the wartime cooperation between the United Kingdom and the United States. He spent his retirement at Avon Castle, near Ringwood, and acted as Ringwood's town crier. His obituary in The Telegraph stated he was:

A man of great imagination, energy, stamina, ingenuity and humour, [and] ... understood that in order to get a plan off the ground it was necessary, on occasion, to sail rather close to the wind.

== Works ==
- Lovely Day Tomorrow, play
- Stately Homes Of England, play
- books on the Profumo affair, Mayflower II, and casino management
