= Alan McGlashan =

British RFC/RAF pilot & doctor (1898–1997)

Alan Fleming McGlashan
- Born: 20 October 1898; Bedworth, Warwickshire
- Died: 6 May 1997 (aged 98); London
- Education: Epsom College; Clare College, Cambridge
- Known for: Pilot and doctor
- Spouses: Hilda Cameron-Smith (m. 1934; died 1975); Sasha Baldi (m. 1979)
- Awards: Military Cross; Croix de Guerre with Palm
- Aviation career
- Air force: Royal Flying Corps

Alan Fleming McGlashan, MC (20 October 1898 in Bedworth, Warwickshire – 6 May 1997 in London) was a British pilot and doctor.

His father was a medical doctor in General Practice. McGlashan joined the Royal Flying Corps in 1916, later the RAF.

After constantly flying over German lines, he was mentioned in despatches (MiD), awarded the MC and the Croix de Guerre with Palm, the citation reading, He has accomplished all his missions with the greatest devotion, and on many occasions has succeeded in reconnaissance at very low altitude in perilous conditions under violent enemy fire.

McGlashan was educated at Epsom College. The student exhibition he won to Clare College, Cambridge, had been deferred to 1918 (B.A. 1921). He trained for the medical profession at St George's Hospital (MRCS and LRCP 1924). After qualifying, he joined a tramp steamer as ship's surgeon. He also worked as a drama critic for The Observer and News Chronicle.

After joining his father in general practice, he trained at the Maudsley Hospital and the Tavistock Clinic, qualifying as a consultant psychiatrist (D.P.M.) in 1940.

Later, after meeting C.G. Jung and reading his works, McGlashan, though eclectic in his work, leaned strongly towards Jungian analysis. Between 1941 and 1945 McGlashan was consulting psychiatrist on the War Office Selection Boards. He was a member of the psychiatric staff at St George's Hospital, the Maudsley Hospital and the West End Hospital; his private practice was for many years in Wimpole Street, and later at his home. His patients included Charles, Prince of Wales and, as she would become, Diana, Princess of Wales.

In 1934 he married Hilda Cameron-Smith (died 1975), and in 1979 he married Sasha Baldi.

Laurens van der Post and Arthur Koestler were close friends. He died in London on 6 May 1997, aged 98.

== Interests ==
McGlashan's interests included flying gliders, ballooning, tennis, and bridge.

== Writings ==
- The Savage and Beautiful Country, Chatto & Windus 1966, Houghton 1967. Expanded edition Daimon Publishers 1988, ISBN 3-85630-517-3
- Gravity and Levity, Chatto 1975, Houghton 1976. Expanded edition Daimon Publishers 1994, ISBN 3-85630-548-3
- The Freud/Jung Letters – abridged with preface by A. McGlashan 1979, ISBN 0-691-03643-8
- St. George & the Dragon, Selwyn Blunt 1931
- Contributor to Suicide of a Nation, ed. Arthur Koestler 1963
- Contributions to Lancet, Listener, Encounter, Réalités, Parabola, Harvest, four of the Take-Home Books, Pergamon Press 1964–70
- Contribution 'How to be Haveable' to The Rock Rabbit and the Rainbow, editor Robert Hinshaw, Daimon Publishers 1998, ISBN 3-85630-540-8
- The Times 24 September 1983 p. 8: 'Treat the Patient as a Person'
