= Paul Burke (rugby union, born 1973) =

Ireland international rugby union player

- Born: Paul Burke; 1 May 1973 (age 53) Paddington, London, England
- Height: 1.73 m (5 ft 8 in)
- Weight: 85 kg (13 st 5 lb)
- School: St Paul's Catholic School; Epsom College
- University: Loughborough University

Rugby union career
- Position: Fly-half
- Current team: Epsom College
Amateur team(s)
Years	Team	Apps	(Points)
1991–1994	Loughborough Students		
1994–1996	Cork Constitution		
Senior career
Years	Team	Apps	(Points)
1992–1994	London Irish	21	(63)
1994–1996	Munster Rugby		
1996–1998	Bristol	50	(500)
1998–2000	Cardiff	32	(50)
2000–2004	Harlequins	88	(995)
2004–2006	Munster Rugby	38	(245)
2006–2008	Leicester Tigers	21	(122)
- Correct as of 31 May 2008
International career
Years	Team	Apps	(Points)
1992	England U21	1	(0)
1995–2003	Ireland	13	(108)

Paul Burke (born 1 May 1973), educated at Epsom College in Surrey, is an Irish rugby union player who played at Fly Half. He has formerly played for Cork Constitution, London Irish, Munster, Bristol, Cardiff and Harlequins. He signed for English club Leicester Tigers for the 2006–7 season and helped take the team to three finals in that year. The 2007–2008 season was plagued by injury and he retired at the end of that season. He has since become kicking coach for Leicester Tigers.
