= John Lumsden Propert =

English physician and art critic

- Born: 9 April 1834
- Died: 7 March 1902 (aged 67)
- Occupations: Physician and art critic

John Lumsden Propert (9 April 1834 – 7 March 1902) was an English physician and art critic.

== Biography ==
Propert was born on 9 April 1834. He was the son of John Propert (1792–1867), surgeon, by his wife Juliana Ross. His father founded in 1855 the Royal Medical Benevolent College, Epsom, of which he was long treasurer. Propert was educated at Marlborough College (Aug. 1843–Dec. 1847), and at King's College Hospital. He obtained the diploma of the Royal College of Surgeons of England and the licence of the Society of Apothecaries in 1855, and in 1857 he graduated M.B. with honours in medicine at the University of London. He then joined his father in general practice in New Cavendish Street, London, and became highly successful.

Propert was widely known in artistic circles as a good etcher and a connoisseur of art. His house, 112 Gloucester Place, Portman Square, was filled with beautiful specimens of Wedgwood, bronzes, and jewelled work. He was credited with being one of the first to revive the taste for miniature painting in England. His very fine collection of miniatures was dispersed by sale in 1897. He published in 1887 'A History of Miniature Art, Notes on Collectors and Collections,' and compiled in 1889, with introduction, the illustrated catalogue of the exhibition of portrait miniatures at the Burlington Fine Arts Club.

Propert died at his house in Gloucester Place on 7 March 1902, and was buried at Brookwood cemetery. He married in 1864 Mary Jessica, daughter of William Hughes of Worcester, and had three sons and three daughters, of whom a son and three daughters survived him.
