= Pilgrim Belle =

1993-built sternwheel paddleboat

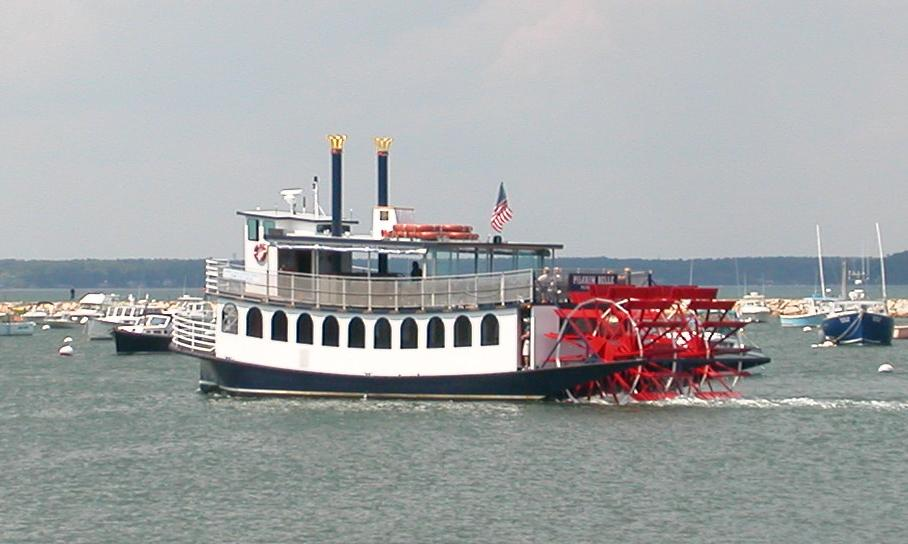
- Pilgrim Belle in Plymouth Harbor

History

United States
- Name: Pilgrim Belle
- Namesake: The Pilgrims
- Owner: Captain John Boats
- Operator: Pilgrim Belle Cruises LLC
- Builder: River Head Marine
- Acquired: 1993
- In service: 1993
- Status: In service

General characteristics
- Length: 65 ft (20 m)
- Propulsion: 2 paddle wheels; 2 John Deere diesel engines
- Speed: 10 kn (19 km/h)
- Capacity: 90 passengers
- Sensors & processing systems: Marine VHF radio; GPS; Radar

Pilgrim Belle is a small, paddle-driven excursion boat in Plymouth, Massachusetts. Built in 1993, the Belle is owned and operated by Captain John Boats, which owns multiple fishing boats in Plymouth. She shares a pier with the 1956-built replica ship Mayflower II.

== Design and construction ==
Pilgrim Belle was built by River Head Marine in 1993. She has a top speed of 10 knots and a fuel capacity of 500 gallons. She was built to a design by naval architect Bill Preston, which resembles classic Mississippi River steamboats.

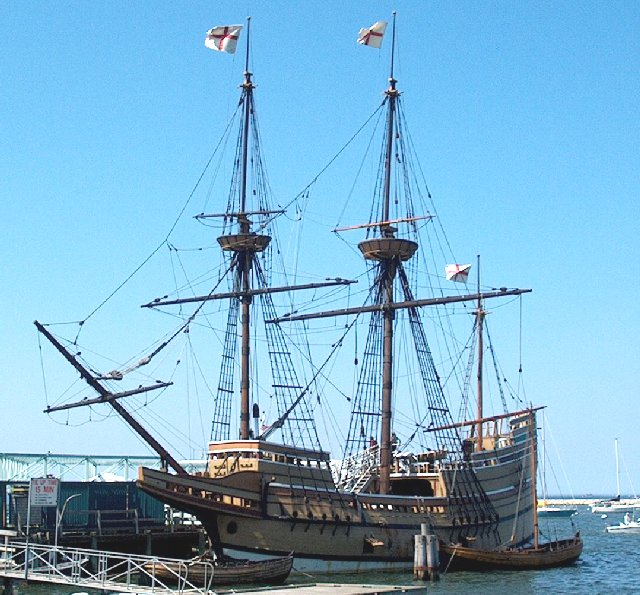
Mayflower II, which shares Frazier State Pier with Pilgrim Belle.

== Service history ==
Entering service in 1993, she has been a staple of Plymouth Harbor ever since. During the winters of 2003 to 2008, she operated out of Delray Beach, Florida, while continuing to operate out of Plymouth during the summer. The presence of paddle-wheels allows the boat to utilize her paddles to turn instead of using a rudder or azimuth thrusters, making her able to turn in place. Because of this, she does not need any assistance past mooring lines when maneuvering into her pier. The boat does three types of cruises:

- Harbor Cruise: Leaving from Frazier State Pier, the boat does a tour of Plymouth Harbor with narration from the captain about the history of the town. During these voyages, she has a fully stocked galley. The route brings Pilgrim Belle to circle around Duxbury Pier Light, known locally as "Bug Light", and back to her pier. The total duration is around 75 minutes.
- Sunset Cruise: As the name suggests, this is similar to the harbor cruise, but at sunset. Because of being later in the day, these excursions are tailored towards adults and feature a full-service bar. The total duration is around 90 minutes.
- Private Charters: Pilgrim Belle is available for charters, which could include weddings, class reunions, birthdays, or corporate outings.

== External ==
- Official Website of Captain John Boats, owner and operater of the vessel
- Official Website of Bug Light, a landmark on the harbor cruises
