= Alastair Dickenson =

British antiques expert

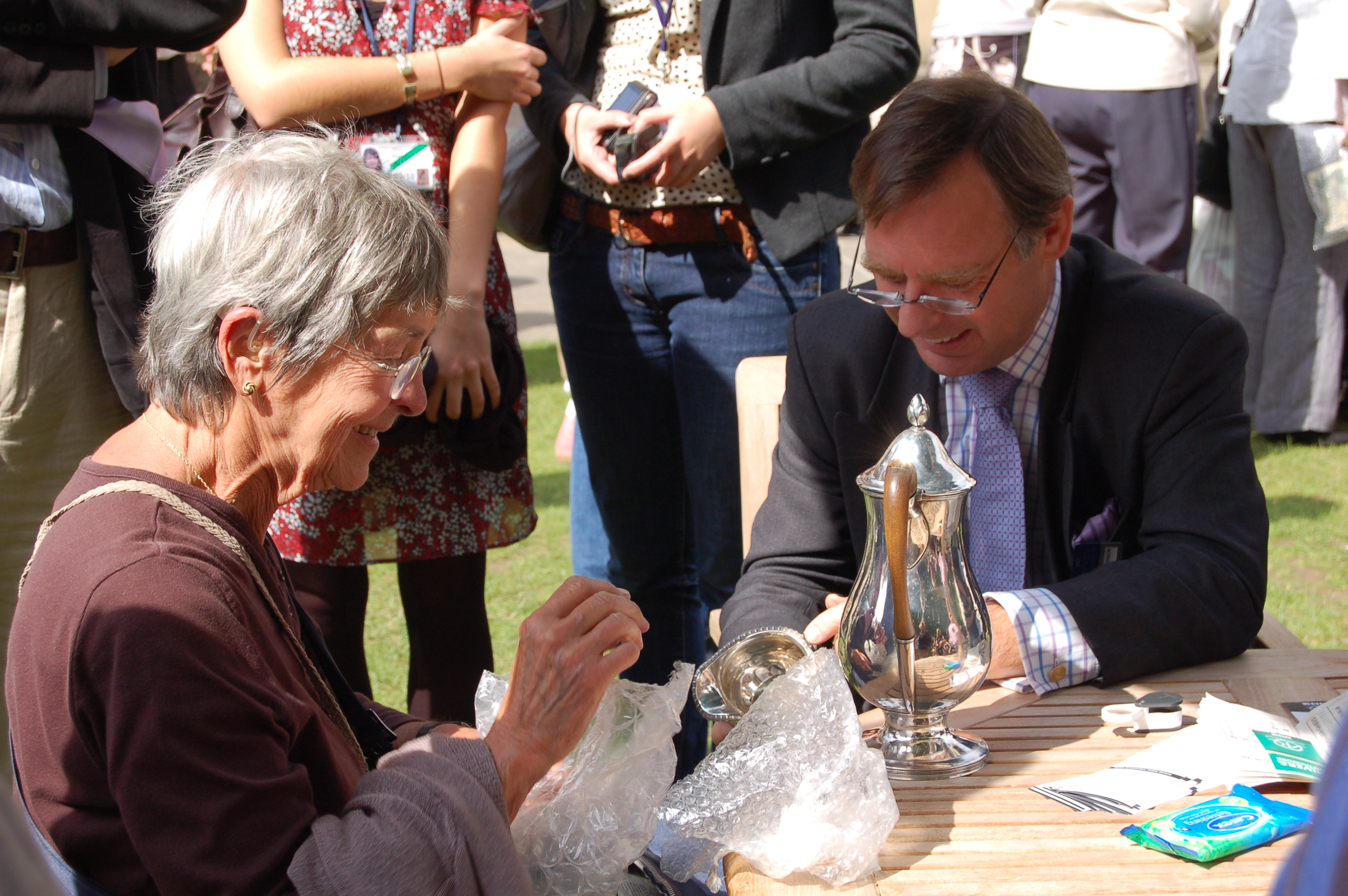
Dickenson during an Antiques Roadshow filming in 2010

Alastair Dickenson (born 27 October 1950 in Leatherhead) is a silver expert. He has made regular appearances on the BBC programme Antiques Roadshow since 1992. Educated at Epsom College, he began his career in the silver trade by joining one of London's major auction houses, Phillips Fine Art Auctioneers, in 1971. By 1983 he had been appointed Head of Antique Silver at Asprey, moving up to becoming a Director of the Antiques Department in 1994. In 1996 he started up his own business in Jermyn Street.

He has lectured all over the world on 16th- to 19th-century silver and silver fakes.
