= Arnold Powell =

Arnold Cecil Powell (18 September 1882 – 15 November 1963) was an English schoolmaster, educationalist and clergyman who was head master of several schools successively, ending his career as Custos of St Mary’s Hospital, Chichester.

== Early life ==
The son of W. H. Powell, he was educated at St Olave's Grammar School, London, and Trinity College, Cambridge, where he was an open Exhibitioner and took his degree in the Natural Sciences Tripos.

== Career ==
Powell's first post was as an assistant master at Gresham's School. He next taught at King’s School, Grantham, and at Sedbergh School. His first appointment as a headmaster came at Skipton Grammar School, from where he was appointed head at Bedford Modern School in 1917, before serving as head master at Epsom College from 1922 to 1939. In 1939 Powell became Rector of Graffham with Lavington, where he remained until 1947, and served also as Rural Dean of Petworth from 1945 to 1947. In 1947 he was appointed Prebendary of Highleigh and acted as Custos of St Mary’s Hospital, Chichester, from 1954 to 1962.

== Private life ==
In 1909, Powell married Mary Winnifred, a daughter of A. Walker, of Haxby Hall, York, and they had two sons and one daughter. After his first wife had died in 1954, in 1955 he married secondly Eva, the widow of Canon Salwey of Chichester.

He was a member of the Public Schools Club.

== Publications ==
- Arnold Cecil Powell, The Hospital of the Blessed Mary, Chichester (1962)
