= Epsom College =

Private school near Epsom, Surrey, England

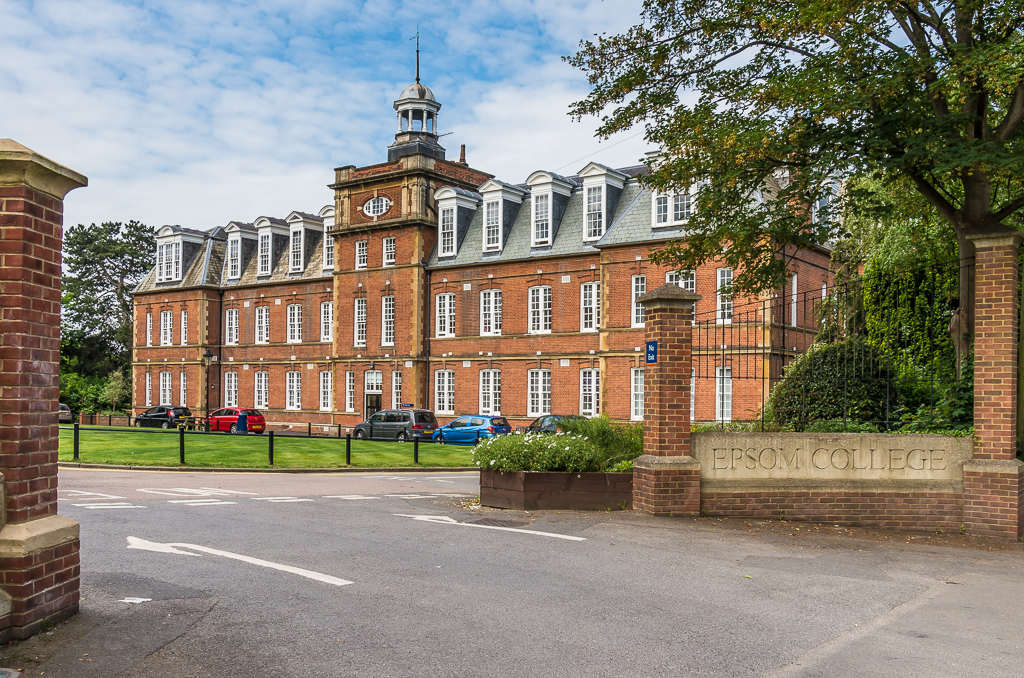

Location
- College Road; Epsom, Surrey, KT17 4JQ; England; 51°19′31″N 00°14′43″W

Information
- Type: Public school Private boarding and day school
- Motto: "Deo Non Fortuna" (Latin for "Not through luck but by God")
- Religious affiliation: Church of England
- Established: 1855; 171 years ago
- Founder: John Propert
- Department for Education URN: 125332 Tables
- Head: Mark Lascelles
- Gender: Coeducational
- Age: 11 to 18
- Enrolment: 956 (2019/20)
- Houses: 13
- Colours: Blue and white
- Publication: The Epsomian
- Alumni: Old Epsomians
- Website: www.epsomcollege.org.uk

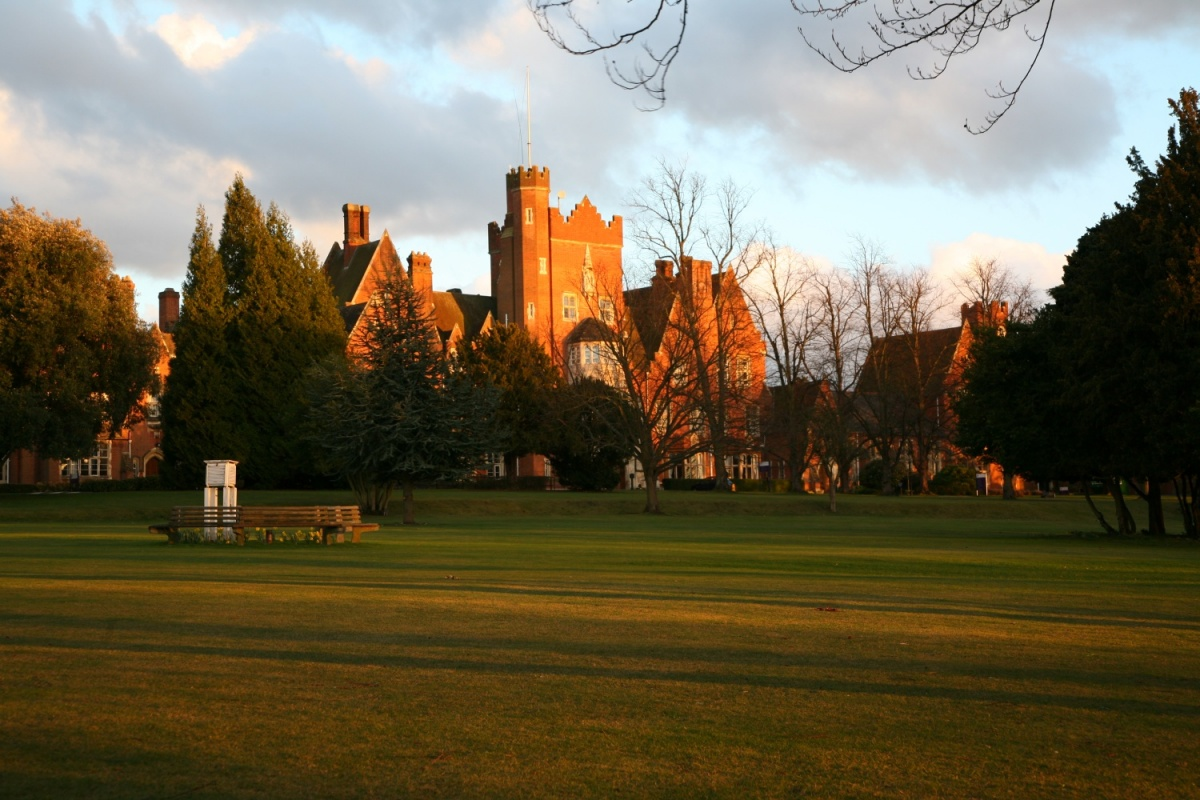
The Tower and main entrance, as seen from across Main Lawn

Epsom College is a co-educational independent school on Epsom Downs, Surrey, England, for pupils aged 11 to 18. It was founded in 1853 as a benevolent institution which provided a boarding school education for sons of poor or deceased members of the medical profession and also accommodation for pensioned doctors. Soon after foundation the college opened to pupils from outside the medical profession. Over time the charitable work for medical professionals in hardship moved to a separate charity. By 1996 the school was fully co-educational and now takes day pupils throughout. The headteacher is a member of the Headmasters' and Headmistresses' Conference.

== Foundation ==
The school was founded in 1853 by John Propert as the Royal Medical Benevolent College, with the aim to provide accommodation for pensioned medical doctors or their widows and to provide a "liberal education" to 100 sons of "duly qualified medical men" for £25 each year.

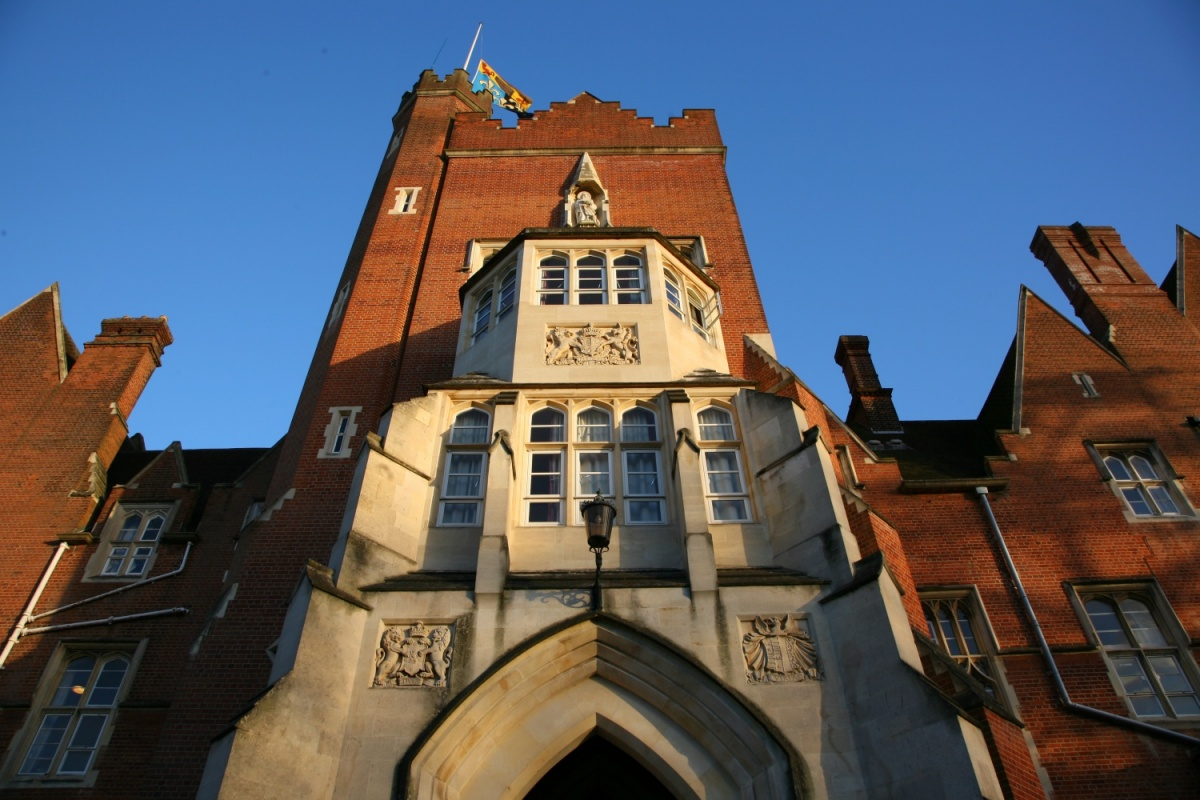
The Grade II listed Tower and main building, demonstrating the architectural theme of a large number of the buildings on campus.

The establishment of the college was the culmination of a campaign begun in 1844 by the Provincial Medical and Surgical Association, the forerunner of the British Medical Association. The scheme saw the medical profession was "in regard to charitable institutions for the aged and infirm, the widow and the orphan, the worst provided of all professions and callings" and took as its aim the alleviating of poverty and debt. Discussions were chaired by Sir John Forbes, Physician to Prince Albert and the Royal Household, and followed similar plans establishing schools for the Clergy and the Royal Navy in desiring to raise money to found "schools for the sons of medical men", providing an education which would otherwise be "beyond the means of many parents".

By 1851, the Medical Benevolent Society had limited itself to the foundation of a single Benevolent College and met in Treasurer John Propert's house in New Cavendish Street, Marylebone. The new campaign's fund-raising activities included dinners, which numerous doctors and Members of Parliament attended, and concerts, for example at one such event, on 4 July 1855, composer Hector Berlioz conducted the UK premiere of his symphonic suite Harold in Italy.

The foundation stone was laid on 6 July 1853. Almost two years later, on 25 June 1855, the college was formally opened by Prince Albert and his son, the future King Edward VII, in front of an unexpectedly large crowd of around 6,000. In March 1855, Queen Victoria consented to become patron, and the school's relationship with British monarchs has continued since. King Edward VII became patron after the death of his mother, followed by King George V in 1936, King George VI in 1937, and Queen Elizabeth II.

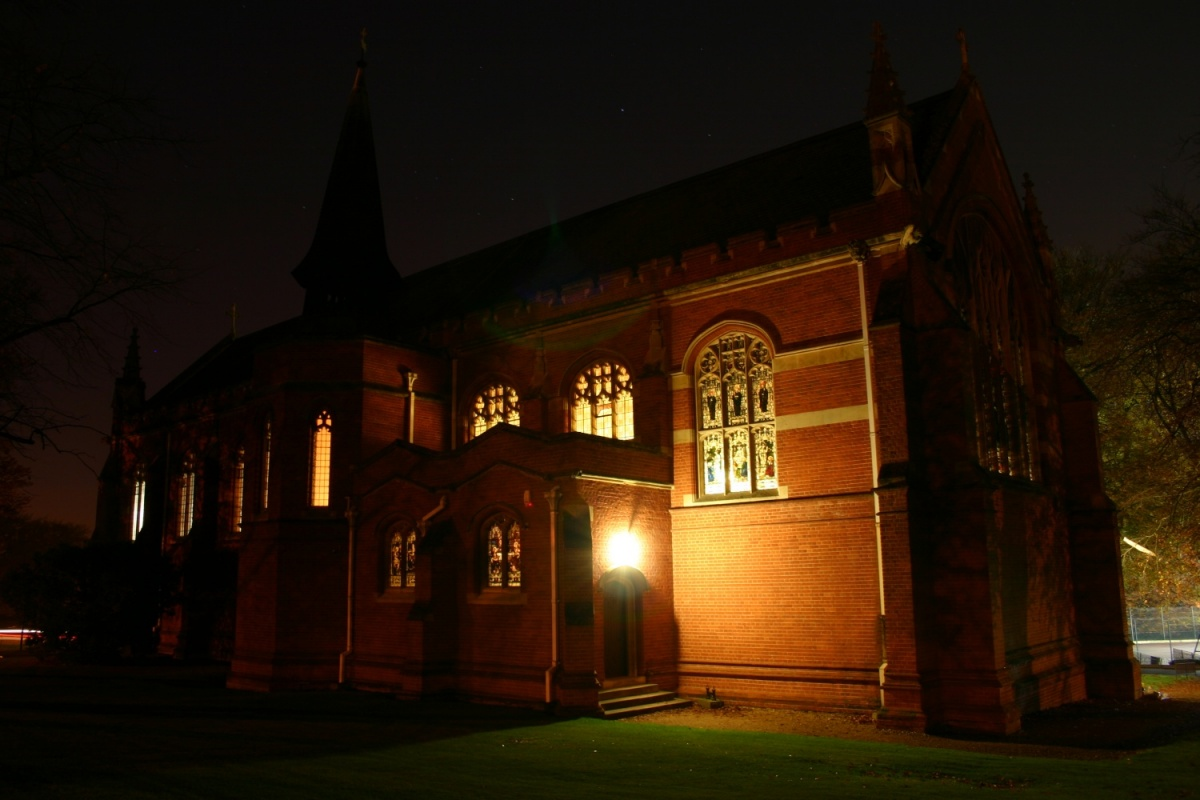
The Grade II Listed College Chapel

In 1980, it was estimated by a history of the college that a third of its 10,000 alumni had entered the medical profession.

== Development and charity ==
It was founded in 1855 to support poor members of the medical profession. Funding for such a bold undertaking proved inadequate, resulting in a reduced number of buildings and insufficient space to support 100 pensioners and 100 boys. In the 1860s, partially due to this, the school was opened up to children of non-medical parents. In subsequent decades, pensioners were supported off-site until there were none on campus by the end of the 19th century. These moves mark the transition towards the college becoming a public school in the modern sense.

Number of Pupils by year. An overview of the development of the College.

The college continued its charitable activities, alongside its strictly educational role, throughout the 20th century. It was only in 2000 that the Royal Medical Foundation was formed as a separate entity, funding the support of four Foundationers at the college, 27 outside it, and paying 20 pensions and supporting one doctor at a medical home.

In the 1920s, the junior school side was run down, and thereafter the college catered only for 13- to 18-year-olds. In 1976, girls were first allowed into the sixth form. The school became fully co-educational in September 1996.

Its campus is on the outskirts of Epsom, near Epsom Downs on the North Downs, near the racecourse, home to the annual Epsom Derby. Its buildings date from 1853 and are mostly influenced by the Gothic revival architecture, described by Prince Albert as the "pointed style of the 14th Century".

St Luke's Chapel was designed by Arthur Blomfield to replace the existing chapel, which the school had outgrown. Built of red brick with ashlar dressings and a slate roof, the building was consecrated in October 1896. In February 1925, the nave was extended and dedicated as a memorial to the 140 former pupils who died in the First World War. In 1974, the main school building and the chapel attained Grade II listed status.

== Epsom College in Malaysia ==
In 2009, the college announced the foundation of a new school in Bandar Enstek, just south of Kuala Lumpur. Epsom College in Malaysia was officially opened in September 2014. The school offers a British educational style for pupils aged three to eighteen years. Students are also offered a wide variety of recreational and competitive sporting opportunities, such as badminton, squash, hockey, tennis, and swimming.

== OFT inquiry ==
In 2005 the school was one of fifty of the country's leading independent schools which were found guilty of running an illegal price-fixing cartel, exposed by The Times newspaper, although the schools made clear that they had not realised that the change to the law (which had happened only a few months earlier) about the sharing of information had subsequently made it an offence. Each school was required to pay a nominal penalty of £10,000 and all agreed to make ex-gratia payments totalling three million pounds into a trust designed to benefit pupils who attended the schools during the period in respect of which fee information was shared.

Jean Scott, the then-head of the Independent Schools Council, said that independent schools had always been exempt from anti-cartel rules applied to business, were following a long-established procedure in sharing the information with each other, and that they were unaware of the change to the law (on which they had not been consulted). She wrote to John Vickers, the OFT director-general, saying, "They are not a group of businessmen meeting behind closed doors to fix the price of their products to the disadvantage of the consumer. They are schools that have quite openly continued to follow a long-established practice because they were unaware that the law had changed".

== Failed inspection ==
In 2021, a regulatory compliance inspection by the Independent Schools Inspectorate found that the college was not meeting its statutory requirements in respect of safeguarding, safeguarding of boarders, behaviour and measures to prevent bullying, and that the standards relating to leadership and management of the school were not met. A short visit the following year after the appointment of a new head (Emma Pattison) focusing on these issues found that they had been rectified and the standards were now met.

== Death of head teacher and family ==
On 5 February 2023, headteacher Emma Pattison, her husband George, and their seven-year-old daughter Lettie were found dead in their residence, the Head's House, on the school's grounds. Pattison, who was the school's first female head, had been appointed headteacher in September 2022 after six years as head teacher of Croydon High School. Surrey Police suspect that George Pattison had killed his wife and daughter with a firearm, before committing suicide.

Paul Williams was appointed as acting head immediately, with Sir Anthony Seldon, former head of Wellington College, announced as interim head on 17 February 2023 in an email to parents. He was due to be headmaster from 1 March 2023. From September 2024, he was succeeded by Mark Lascelles.

== Houses ==
House Name	Composition	Colours	Named after	Motto	Founded	Housemaster/Mistress
Carr (C)	Day Boys		Dr. William Carr	Pro Christo et Patria Dulce Periculum	1883	Rob Young
Crawfurd (Cr)	Boarding Girls		Sir Raymond Crawfurd, member and former chairman of council	Durum Patientia Frango	1935 as a Day Boys House	Rachel Lee
Fayrer (Fa)	Day Boys		Sir Joseph Fayrer	Quo Aequior eo Melior	1897 as a Junior Boys House	Christopher Telfor-Mason
Forest (F)	Boarding Boys		An early College Benefactor	Semper Forestia	1883	Jonny Bailey
Granville (G)	Boarding Boys		Earl Granville	Frangas non flectes	1883 as 'Gilchrist'. Renamed 1884.	Owen Alsop
Hart Smith	Closed 1965		Former Headmaster Rev. T.N. Hart-Smith-Pearse		1931 for Foundationers aged under 13	n/a
Holman (H)	Boarding Boys		Treasurer Sir Constantine Holman		1897 as a Junior Boys House	Jonny Tidmarsh
Propert (P)	Day Boys		Founder John Propert	Dyfalad	1883 as Boarding Boys House	Alex Buhagiar
Raven (Rv)	Day Girls		Dame Kathleen Raven, member of council	Faith in Adversity	1999	Rhiannon Johnson
Robinson (Rn)	Day Boys		Henry Robinson, chairman of council	Virtute non Verbis	1968	Paul Gillespie
Rosebery (R)	Day Girls		The Earl of Rosebery		1926 as a day boys house became girls in 2008	Beth Eliott Lockhart
White House (Wh)	Day and 6th form Boarding Girls		Original Building Name		1976	Faith Smith
Wilson (W)	Boarding Girls		Sir Erasmus Wilson	Expecta Cuncta Superna	1871, as an independent Boarding Boys House, named 1883 & incorporated into the College 1914.	Rebecca Wilson
Murrell (M)	Day Girls		Dr Christine Murrell	Be of Good Courage	2017	Céline Winmill

House colours are seen in the stripes in the ties worn by the majority of boys (those not wearing colours or prefects' ties); on a rectangular brooch occasionally worn by the girls; and at the neck of girls' school pullovers. They are also used in house rugby and athletics tops. Each house occupies its own building, and they compete with each other in several inter house competitions throughout the year.

In addition to the senior school houses, students in the lower school (years 7 and 8) also have houses that act as their primary classes for both years of their lower school life. These houses are: Wardroper, Hutchinson, Glyn Hughes, Jeffrey and Doudney. Unlike senior school houses, they do not have their own building and do not participate in senior school events.

== Sport ==
=== Association football ===
Association football became the major sport for boys in the Lent Term in 2014. Previously the sport was an option and played at Sixth Form level only. It is now played across all age groups from Under 12 to U18. The college is currently part of the Southern Independent Schools Lent Term League. Many students have represented football academies alongside the College at football, including Chelsea, Crystal Palace and AFC Wimbledon. Students have also represented England and Wales internationally.

=== Rifle shooting ===
Epsom College has a long history of target rifle shooting, both small-bore and full-bore, and describes itself as the premier rifle shooting school in the UK. The college rifle team has won the national schools fullbore championships, the Ashburton Shield, 17 times, most recently in 2026, the highest number of wins by a school.

=== Rugby football ===
Rugby football is a major boys' sport during the Michaelmas term. Rugby sevens is played in the Lent Term. In 2001, the Epsom College U15 team won their age group in Daily Mail Cup, defeating The John Fisher School by 17–12 at Twickenham in the Final. In 2006, the U16 Epsom sevens team won the 2006 Sevens National Championship at Rosslyn Park by defeating Millfield 29–19. In 2005 Epsom College U15 Team lost to Bedford 10–5 in the Semi-final of the Daily Mail competition.

The Epsom College Director of Rugby is former Ireland international Paul Burke.

== Heads ==
- (1855–1870) Robinson Thornton
- (1870–1885) The Rev. William de Lancy West
- (1885–1889) The Rev. William Cecil Wood
- (1889–1914) The Rev. Thomas Northcote Hart-Smith
- (1914–1922) The Rev. Canon Walter John Barton
- (1922–1939) The Rev. Canon Arnold Cecil Powell
- (1939–1962) Henry William Fernehough Franklin
- (1962–1970) Archibald Duncan Dougal MacCallum
- (1970–1982) Owen John Tressider Rowe
- (1982–1992) John B. Cook
- (1993–2000) Anthony Beadles
- (2000–2012) Stephen Borthwick
- (2012–2022) Jay Piggot
- (2022–2023) Emma Pattison
- (2023) Paul Williams (acting)
- (2023–2024) Sir Anthony Seldon (interim)
- (2024–present) Mark Lascelles

== Southern Railway Schools Class ==
The school lent its name to the thirty-eighth steam locomotive (Engine 937) in the Southern Railway's Class V, of which there were 40. This class was also known as the Schools Class because all 40 of the class were named after prominent English public schools. 'Epsom', as it was called, was built in 1934. The locomotive bearing the school's name was withdrawn in the early 1960s.

== Air raid shelters ==
During the Second World War, in preparation for the possibility of attack from the air, several air raid shelters were built, the outlines of which are still visible in aerial photographs and satellite imagery as a row of negative cropmarks in the grass on the Chapel Triangle. In his 1944 book, Sunday After The War, Henry Miller called these "shelters from aerial bombardment".

== The fives courts ==
Near Wilson Pitch, there are the remnants of several open-air fives courts, one of which is said to be a doubles court. In the late 1960s, these were functional courts, albeit of odd design.

== Notable alumni ==
=== A to D ===
- Ralphie Albert (C 2021-2026). Surrey county and England U19 cricketer.
- Alexander Gordon (Alick) Bearn (C 1936–1940) (b 29 March 1923, d 15 May 2009). A pioneering geneticist known for his research into Wilson's disease
- Tom Armstrong Bowes (left c. 1888) (1869–1954). Physician and antiquarian, co-founder of Herne Bay Museum and Gallery
- Roland Boys Bradford (left 1907) (23 February 1892 – 30 November 1917) recipient of the Victoria Cross during First World War
- Jeaffreson Vennor Brewer (1866–1870) rugby union international for England in 1875
- Professor Neville Butler (G 1933–1935) (b 6 July 1920, d 22 February 2007), paediatrician
- Paul Burke (G 1989–1991), Irish International Rugby Union Fly-half.
- Christian Candy (Rn 1989–1993)
- Nick Candy (Rn 1986–1991)
- Alex Carlile, Baron Carlile of Berriew, CBE, QC (born 12 February 1948), Liberal Democrat member of the House of Lords.
- Warwick Charlton (b 9 March 1918, d 10 December 2002, conceived of, built, and sailed the Mayflower II, a replica of the Mayflower, in 1957 from Plymouth, Devon, to Plymouth, Massachusetts
- Alice Davidson-Richards, (b 29 May 1994) England Cricketer
- Tyger Drew-Honey (C 2009– ) (b 26 January 1996), Child actor best known for his role in the hit BBC sitcom Outnumbered.
- Alastair Dickenson, Silver expert

=== E to K ===
- McCormack Charles Farrell Easmon (left 1907), Doctor, Campaigner for Racial Equality in Sierra Leone, and founder of the Sierra Leone Museum
- Charles Syrett Farrell Easmon, CBE, MD, PhD, MRCP, FRCPath, FMedSci, (1946), British microbiologist and medical professor
- Michael Fallon, Member of Parliament for Sevenoaks and former Secretary of State for Defence.
- Tony Fernandes (H 1977–1983), a Malaysian entrepreneur, CEO and founder of AirAsia.
- Geoffrey Gillam FRCP (28 January 1905 – 15 February 1970) (left 1923), consultant cardiologist
- Stewart Granger (6 May 1913 – 16 August 1993) (left 1923), Hollywood Actor
- Sir Charles Felix Harris (b 30 March 1900, New York, d 10 March 1974) Vice Chancellor of London University from 1958 to 1961
- Sir Laurence Hartnett (b 26 May 1898, d 4 April 1986), played a pivotal role in the development of Australia's automotive industry and is often called "The Father of the Holden"
- Sir Alfred Bakewell Howitt (1879–1954), doctor and Conservative Member of Parliament
- Keith Irvine, interior designer
- Ciara Janson, (Cr 2000–2004) (b 27 April 1987) Actress (best known as Nicole Owen from Hollyoaks)
- Richard Stanley Leigh Jones (R 1953–1958) (born 1940), Australian parliamentarian.
- Desmond King-Hele, (R 1941–1945) (b 3 November 1927) physicist and author.
- Kris Kim, (Fa 2019-2024) (b 2007) Amateur golfer

=== L to R ===
- Derek (William) Lambert (b 10 October 1929, d 2001), Thriller writer, also journalist
- Professor Suzannah Lipscomb, a historian, academic and broadcaster who specialises in the sixteenth century. She has presented programmes across the BBC and on Britain's Channel 4 Television and ITV networks, and on National Geographic Channel, The History Channel (now known as 'History') and on the Public Broadcasting Service in the United States.
- George Lowe (b 22 October 1989), a professional rugby union footballer for Harlequins in the Guinness Premiership.
- Philip Gadesden Lucas, (C 1918-1918) (b 1902, d 1981) George Medallist.
- Sir Anthony McCowan, (b 12 January 1928, d 3 July 2003), Lord Justice of Appeal from 1989 to 1997
- Alan McGlashan, (P 1010-1916) (20 October 1898 in Bedworth, Nottinghamshire – 6 May 1977 in London) psychiatrist, pilot, author and theatre critic
- Ross McGowan, (born 23 April 1982), English professional golfer.
- Sir Halford John Mackinder (b 1861, d 1947), Geographer
- Gyles Mackrell, (P 1898-1905) (b 1888, d 1959), George Medallist.
- Jonathan Maitland (Cr 1974–1979), ITV Television journalist
- Mark Mardell, BBC North America Editor; fmr. BBC Europe Editor; Television Journalist, Radio Journalist
- Ian Fraser Muir (b 1921, d 2008), Plastic surgeon
- Duncan Pailthorpe MC (1890–1970), first-class cricketer and medical doctor in the Royal Army Medical Corps.
- Julian Nott scientist and balloonist who set more than 100 records, including reaching 55,000 feet
- Chukwuemeka Odumegwu Ojukwu (1933–2011) (H 1947 – 1952), military governor of the Eastern Region of Nigeria (1966), head of the Republic of Biafra (1967–1970), and politician after 1983.
- Charlie Wilson-Papps. Academy and Australian national team footballer.
- Parag Patel (1989–1994), Full bore rifle Commonwealth Games Gold Medallist 2006 and 2010
- John Piper (left 1919) (b 13 December 1903 – d 1992), Cubist artist
- Sir Philip Powell, (b 15 March 1921, d 5 May 2003) half of one of the most important British architectural partnerships – Powell & Moya – with Hidalgo Moya, of the post-war period
- Major-General Jim Robertson, (b 23 March 1910, d. 11 February 2004), (C 1924–1928), commanded the 1/7th Gurkha Rifles in Burma and the 1/6th Gurkha Rifles in Malaya; a formidable field commander, he was awarded two DSOs and was four times mentioned in dispatches.

=== S to Z ===
- Sir John Scarlett, head of the British Secret Intelligence Service (MI6) (2004–2009). He is currently [2013] a governor.
- Natalie Sciver, (b 20 August 1992) England Cricketer
- Sergeant Robert George Scott (b 22 April 1857, d 3 October 1918) 99G 1870–1871) VC, DSO, won his Victoria Cross (VC) on 8 April 1879 at Morosi's Mountain, South Africa during the Basuto War.
- Adrian Shooter, founding chairman of Chiltern Railways and of Vivarail
- Kyle Sinckler, professional rugby union player for Bristol, England and the British and Irish Lions
- Flaxman Charles John Spurrell, Archaeologist and Photographer
- Air Vice-Marshal Graham Stacey (Fayrer 1973–77), appointed Commander British Forces Cyprus 2010
- Graham Sutherland (b 24 August 1903, d 17 February 1980) (G 1918–1919) Artist
- Jeremy Vine (b 17 May 1965) (H 1976–1982), BBC Television journalist and Radio Presenter
- Tim Vine (b 1967) (H 1980–1985), comedian
- Sir David Warren, (Cr 1965–1970), (b 1952), in 2010 British Ambassador to Japan.
- Peter Edward Darrell Sheldon Wilkinson (b 1919, d 2009), dermatologist
- Sir Graham Wilson, bacteriologist
- Nicholas Witchell, BBC Television journalist

== Notable staff ==
- Robert (Bob) Roseveare, (b 23 May 1923, d 8 December 2004) Bletchley Park cryptographer
- Nigel Starmer-Smith, Taught Geography while scrum-half for the England rugby union team, prior to his TV Rugby commentary role at the BBC
- Paul Burke, head of rugby from 2016, former Irish International professional rugby union footballer.

== Coat of Arms ==
Coat of arms of Epsom College
Notes Granted 7 June 1910. Crest On a wreath Or and Azure, In front of an eagle's head between two wings Azure, three fleurs-de-lis Or. Escutcheon Per pale Azure and Sable, three fleurs-de-lis Or; on a chief of the last an open book Proper inscribed with the words "Olim meminisse juvabit' between in the dexter a lamp and in the sinister a rod of Aesculapius Gules. Motto 'Deo non fortuna'

== Further reading and sources ==
- Salmon, Michael A (1980). Epsom College the First 125 Years. Old Epsomian Club. 145 pages.
- Scadding, Alan (2004). Benevolence and Excellence: 150 Years of the Royal Medical Foundation of Epsom College. Epsom College. ISBN 978-0-9549549-0-1. 134 pages.
- Swift, Peter (2006). Maunsell 4-4-0 Schools Class. Locomotives in detail. Vol. 6. Hersham: Ian Allan. ISBN 0-71103-178-9.
