= John Propert =

Welsh physician, Epsom College founder (1793 -1867)

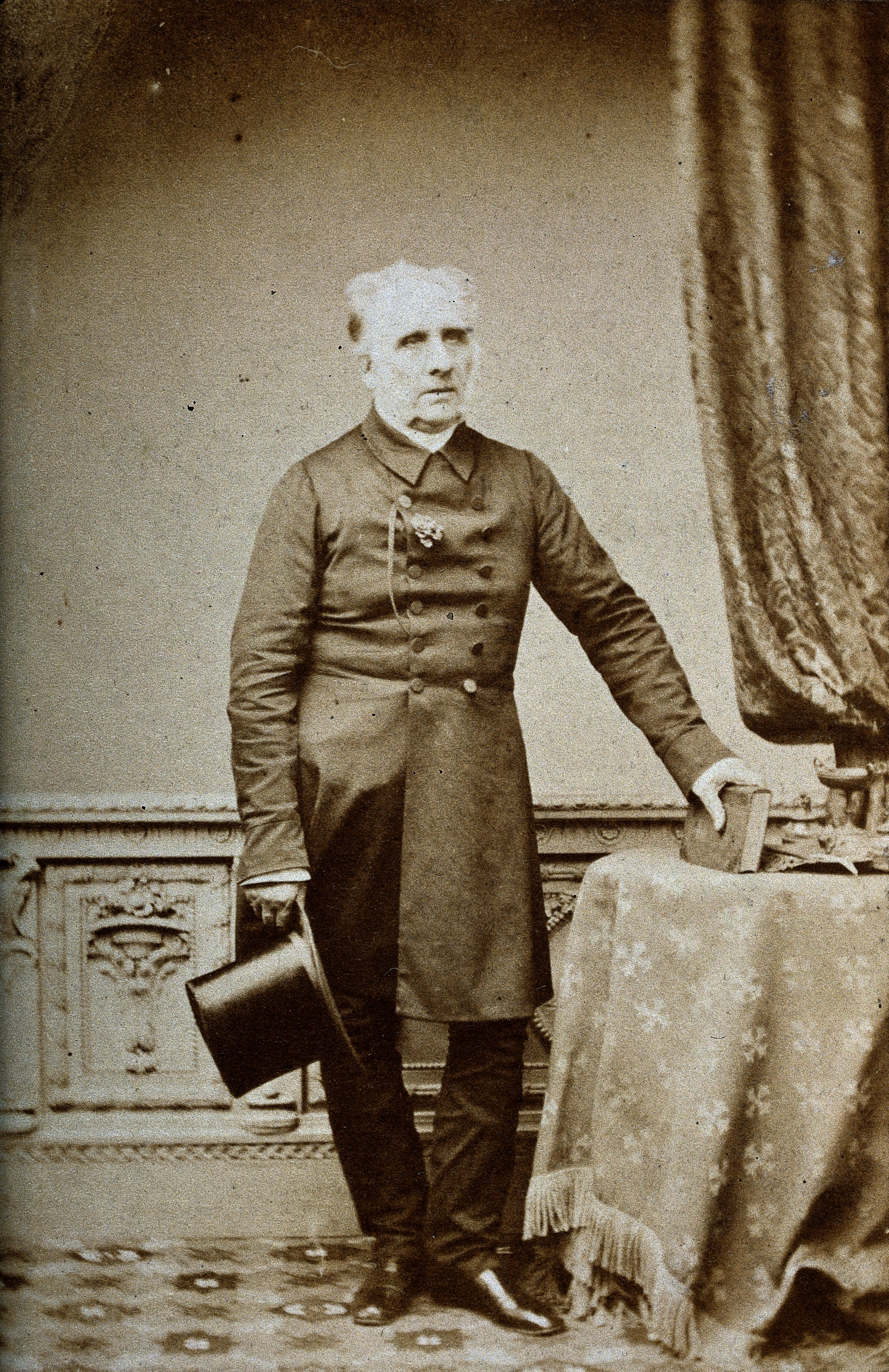
John Propert, about 1855

John Propert DL (19 July 1793 – 9 September 1867) was a Welsh physician who made a successful career in Westminster and is chiefly remembered for founding the Medical Benevolent College at Epsom, Surrey, now called Epsom College.

He was also a trustee of the Medical Protection Society, Chairman of the Carmarthen and Cardigan Railway Company, and High Sheriff of his home county, Cardiganshire.

== Early life ==
Born in 1793 in Blaenpistyll, Blaenannerch, Cardiganshire, Propert was the only son of Thomas Propert and his wife Jane. After an early education at Cardigan Grammar School, in 1808, at the age of fifteen, he joined the Cardiganshire militia. In 1809 he carried the regimental colours at a parade for the Golden Jubilee of George III. With no resources to buy a commission, he left to become a surgeon's assistant in Cardigan, learning the work of an apothecary, dispensing medicines.

Aged seventeen, with money from a relation, Propert joined St Bartholomew's Hospital in Smithfield, London, as a medical student. He was licensed as a naval surgeon and was a Member of the Royal College of Surgeons by the age of 21.

== Career ==
After qualifying as a surgeon, Propert returned to Cardigan and started a practice there. He later returned to the capital city and carried on a practice in Portland Place, Marylebone, Westminster, until his death. He had many rich patients.

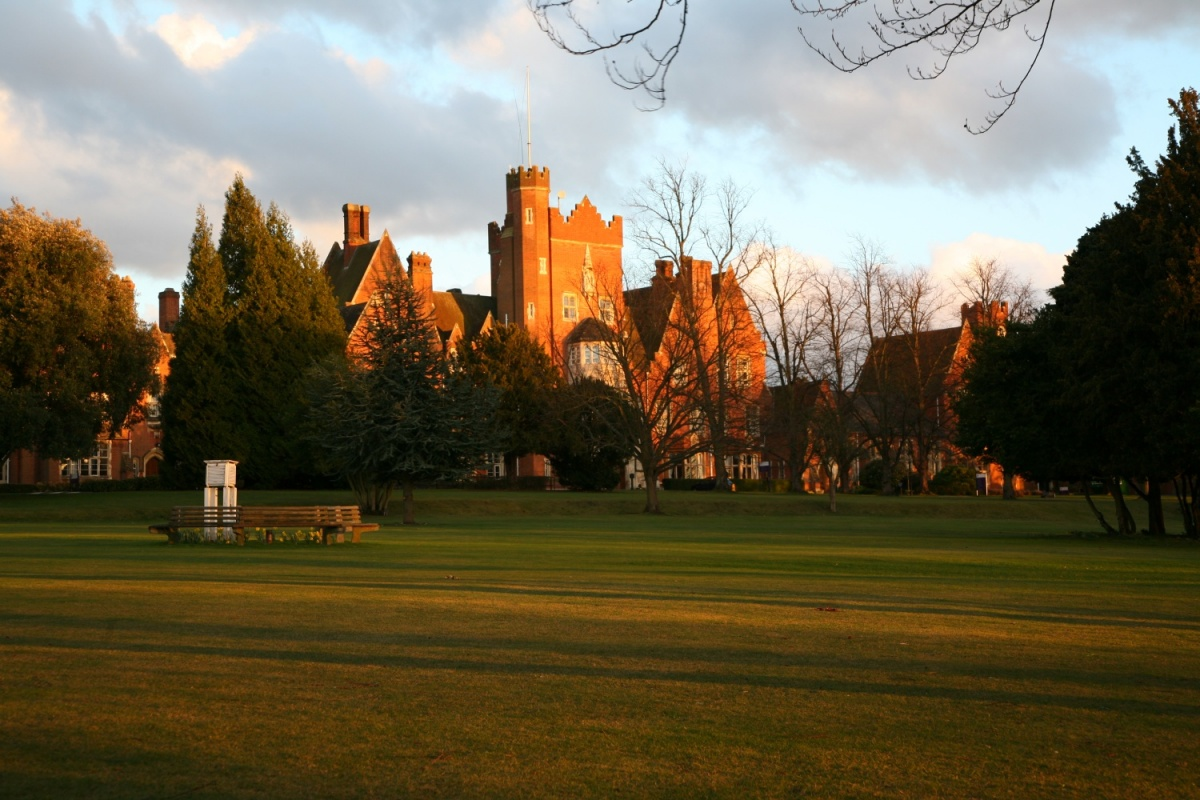
Epsom College

Early in his medical career, Propert became a trustee of the Medical Protection Society, which helped medical men to recover bad debts and gave other professional support. In 1851, he founded the Medical Benevolent College, which he intended to be a charity for helping elderly doctors, their widows and orphans. Much money had to be raised for this, and in 1852 land was bought on Epsom Downs. In 1853, the foundation stone of the college building was laid by Sydney Pierrepont, 3rd Earl Manvers, who became the first president of the college, with more than four thousand people in attendance. After the building was complete, on 25 June 1855 there was a grand opening by Prince Albert, and the college gained the name of Royal Medical Benevolent College. It was initially the home of twenty pensioners, medical men or their widows, and forty foundation scholars, who were all the sons of medical men, who were educated at the expense of the college. Soon these were joined by fee-paying boys, and by 1865 the school could accommodate three hundred.

Propert was the college's first treasurer, raising funds for it until his death in 1867, while carrying on his own medical practice. It later became known as Epsom College.

Propert also became Chairman of the Carmarthen and Cardigan Railway Company, a Deputy Lieutenant of Cardiganshire, and was a governor of the Welsh Charity School at Ashford. In 1857 he was High Sheriff of Cardiganshire.

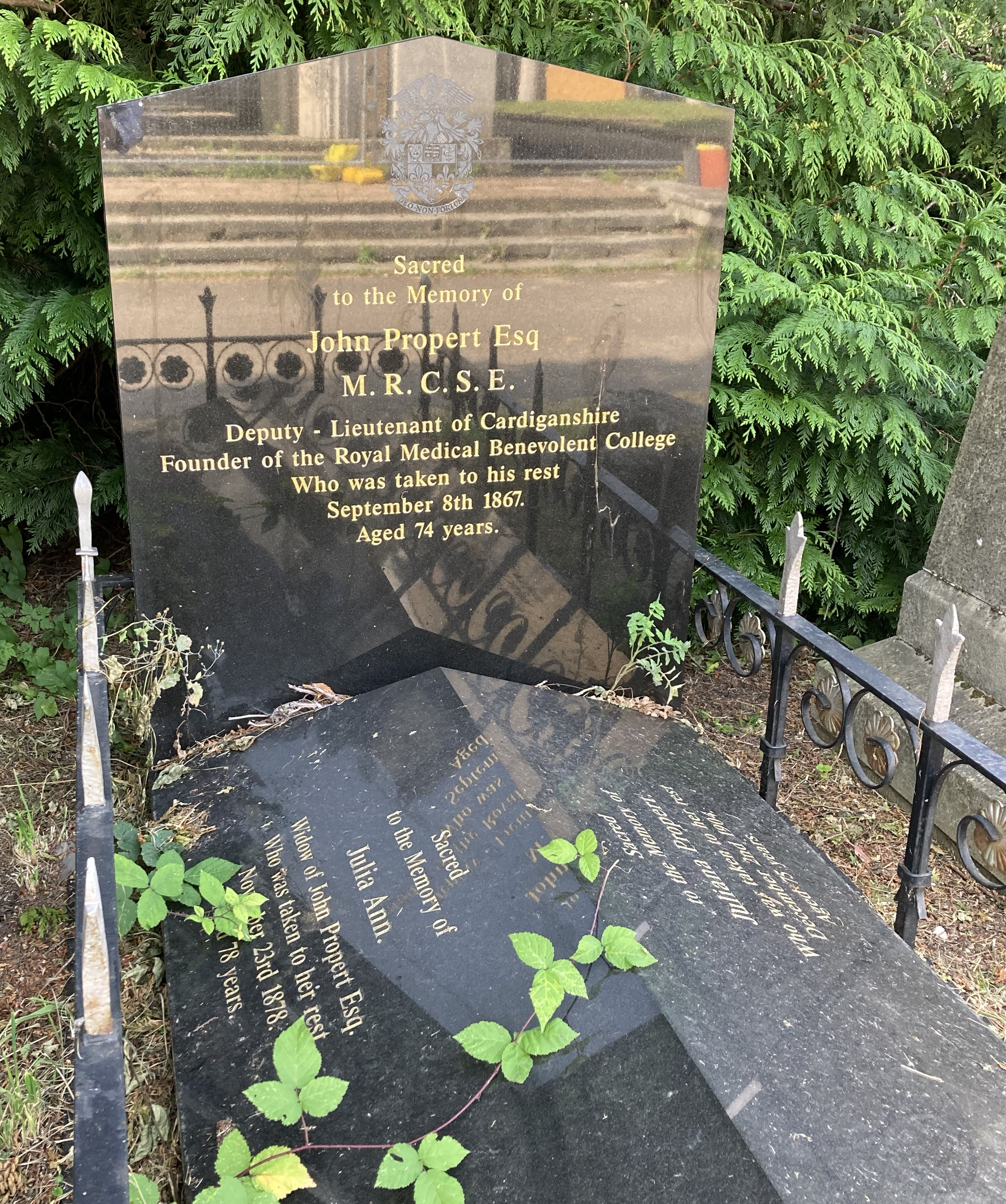
Grave of John Propert in Kensal Green Cemetery

== Personal life ==
In September 1824, Propert married Julia Anne, only daughter of Robert Ross, of Cork, a solicitor. They had three sons and four daughters, and one of their sons, John Lumsden Propert, followed his father's profession and in due course took over his practice in Marylebone, also becoming an art critic.

Propert's mother died in 1813, and his father in 1839. About 1856, Propert paid for a stained glass window designed by N. W. Lavers in the recently built Church of St Cynwyl at Aberporth, in memory of his parents.
