= P. P. Hartnett =

British writer (born 1958)

Peter Paul Hartnett
- PP Hartnett, 2026
- Born: London, UK
- Occupations: Writer, photographer, musician
- Writing career
- Pen name: PP Hartnett (formerly stylised P-P Hartnett until 2005)
- Period: 1976–present
- Genres: Fiction, fashion, lifestyle, novel, short story, poetry, transgressive
- Notable works: Sex : Male, Call Me; Sixteen, I Want To, Rock 'n' Roll Suicide
- Notable awards: North West Arts Award
- Website: hartnett.uk.com

Peter Paul Hartnett (born 1958), aka PP Hartnett, is a London Irish writer, editor, spoken word performer, and photographer currently based at the edge of a forest near coastal Kirkcudbrightshire, Dumfries and Galloway, Scotland. His fiction focuses upon trauma and its consequences. His most notable works include Call Me, I Want To, Rock 'n' Roll Suicide and Sixteen.

PP Hartnett is the founder and editor of Queer Lit Now, a creative writing project.

PP Hartnett has produced two spoken word albums of his fiction, Ferris Wheel Kiss and The Very Idea.

PP Hartnett's download titles, published by Autopsy, include Deletion and Full Screen, as well as the collected works series SEX : MALE that includes Call Me, I Want To, Mmm Yeah, Sixteen, Rock 'n' Roll Suicide, Poz Me Up, You... and Needs Discussion.

== Poetry ==
PP Hartnett has published a number of signed limited edition hardback works via Autopsy, such as Date of Birth, Time of Death (January 2017), Three Men, In Tears (July, 2017), Gentle and Tender, Act of Confession (May, 2018), with works I Shouldn't, Must Stop (January 2019).

== Spoken word ==
2018 releases include schoolboysoul and none of god's business, a two-track download spoken word double A-side (January 2018), and gentle and tender, act of confession, a five-track download spoken word EP (March, 2018).

== Photography ==
Peter Paul Hartnett initially made his name as a photographer on the underground gay club scene, developing and printing his own work. Hartnett took his first nightclub photograph of punk icon Soo Catwoman at Bang Disco, London, in October 1976. He worked at London hotspots such as Leigh Bowery's Taboo, publishing his photography in publications such as i-D, Dazed & Confused, V-Man, Vision, XLR8R, Fused, The Observer Magazine, The Independent Magazine, The Sunday Telegraph Magazine and The Sunday Times Magazine, Elephant, Momopol, To Be Magazine, L'Officiel, Ocula, Plaster, Scenery, The Guardian Review, Harpers Bazaar (Italy), Sphere, T (New York Times), WWD, Another Man, The Standard, Vogue (France), Vogue (UK) among others.

Hartnett's access to non-mainstream alternative spaces offered a view into a previously unseen part of this undocumented subculture. Although his work was journalistic in approach, he claims he has always attempted to capture real life from a moral perspective, saying, 'I tend not to take photographs that are in any way manipulative or exploitative. When I have, for example, photographed someone who has been drunk or drug-fucked, I will often edit these out of a presentation as they can be demeaning. I do not do nudes. Sometimes I have photographed dancers who look so lost, and these images tend not to get published as I feel a camera can be invasive and that is not my intention. I feel very protective about my subjects.'

Hartnett regularly documents London Fashion Week, Graduate Fashion Week, Free Range, plus music festivals, with his favourite being the annual Rebellion Punk Festival.

As a collector of vintage photography, Hartnett has until very recently been a major contributor to the Photographic Youth Music Culture Archive, with his work now represented by Anthony McAndrew of Camera Press.

His broadcasting work has included MTV, VH1, RTL, BBC, Channel 4 and Discovery / TLC.

== Awards and honours ==
Hartnett has won a North West Arts Award.

In 2007, Hartnett was also declared winner of The Manchester Monologues Manchester Metropolitan University Literary Competition, in collaboration with Urbis Offcut at The Manchester Fringe Festival.
