= Hartnett (car) =

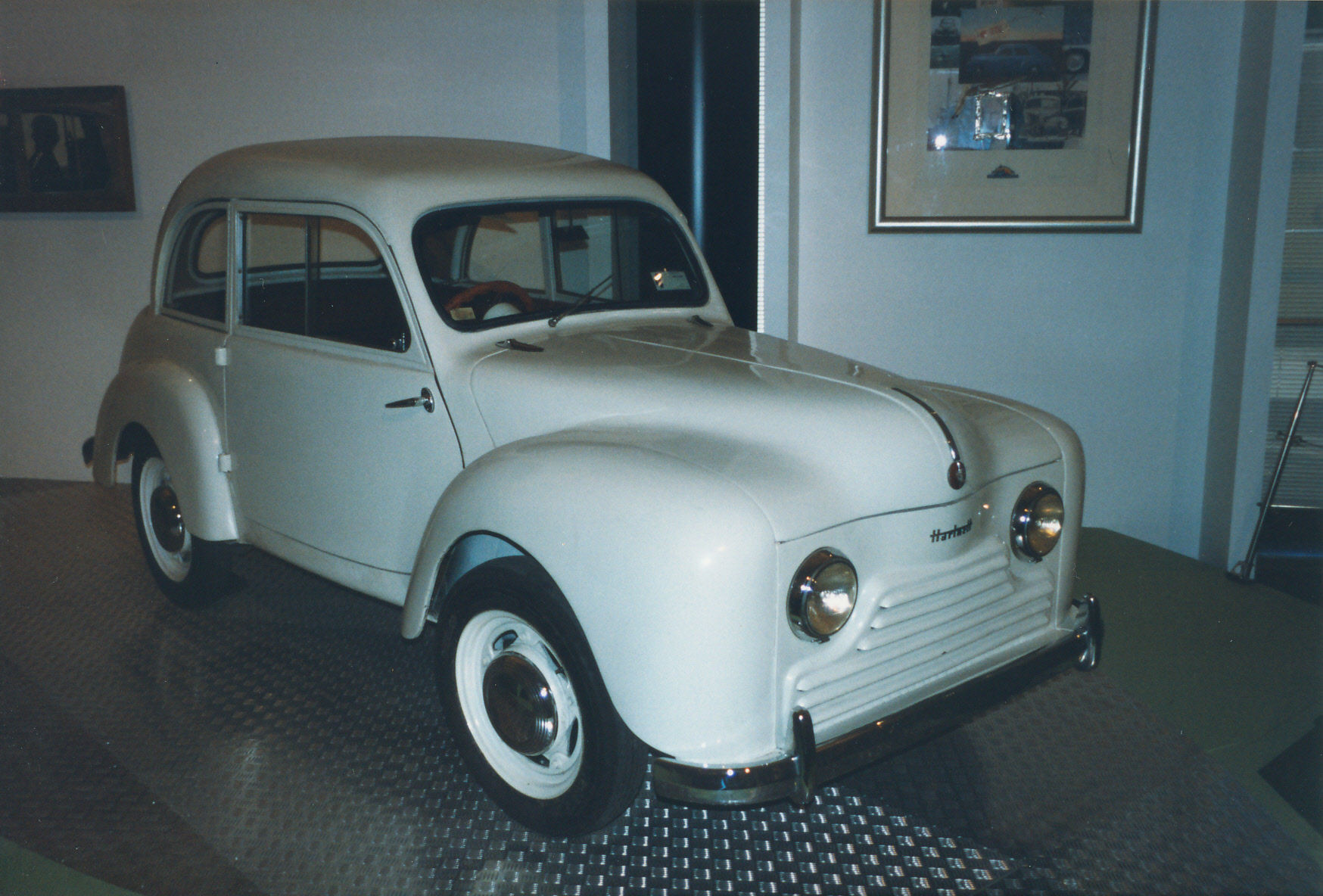
- Hartnett Tasman 2-door sedan

Overview
- Manufacturer: Hartnett Motor Company
- Production: 1951 to 1952
- Designer: Jean Grégoire

Body and chassis
- Class: Compact car
- Body style: 2-door sedan 2-door tourer 3-door station wagon
- Layout: FF layout

Powertrain
- Engine: 594 cc flat twin
- Transmission: 4-speed manual

Dimensions
- Wheelbase: 6 ft 6¾ in
- Length: 11 ft 6 in
- Width: 4 ft 7½ in
- Height: 4 ft 7½ in
- Curb weight: 980 lbs

The Hartnett is an automobile that was produced by the Hartnett Motor Company in Australia from 1951 to 1952.

== Company formation ==
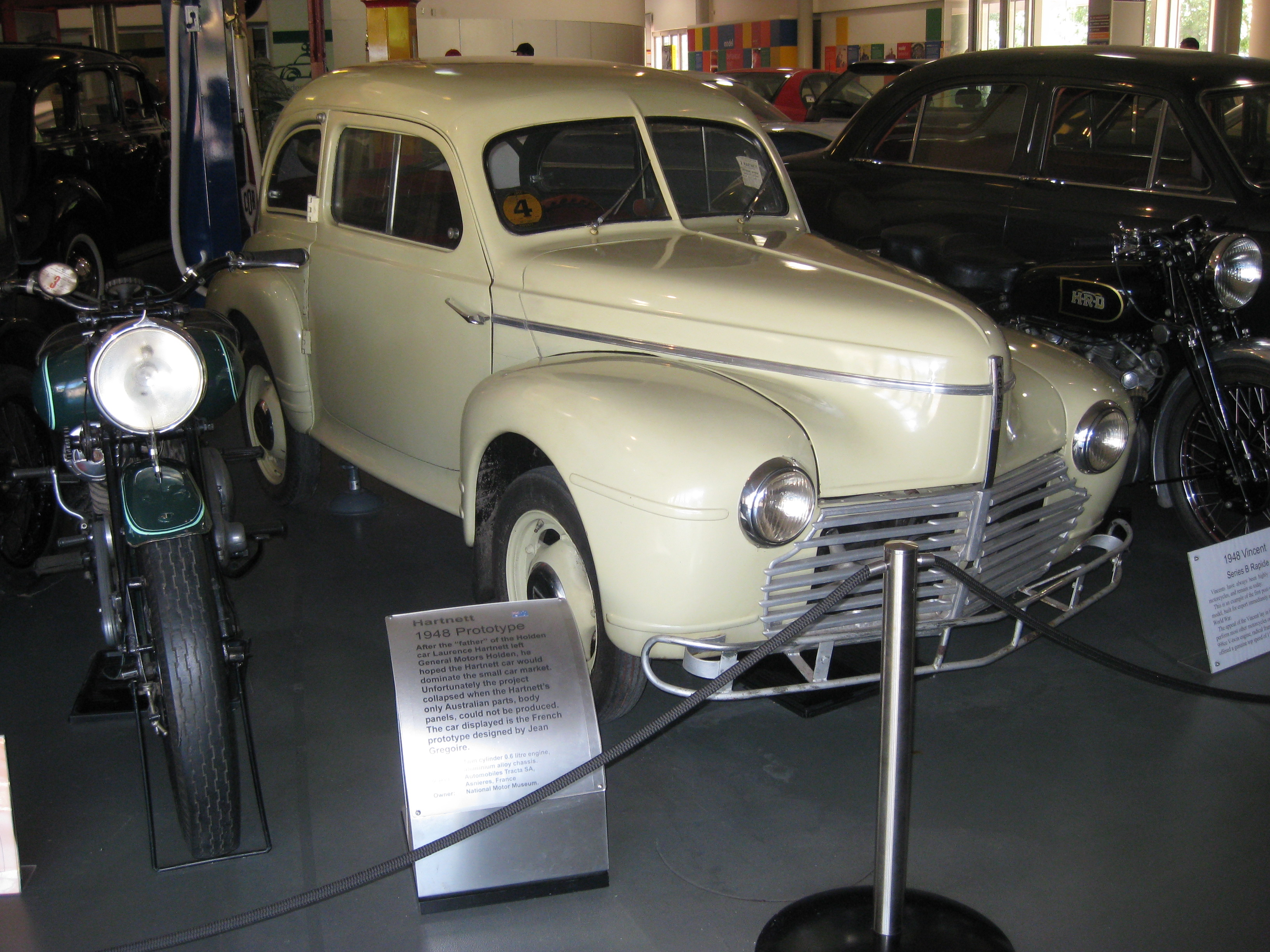
1948 "Grégoire" prototype of the Hartnett

Copy of the Kendall 6hp car advertising brochure hand annotated by Laurence Hartnett, distributed to potential investors in the Hartnett Motor Company

Laurence Hartnett, former Managing Director of General Motors-Holden (GMH), was approached in 1948 by Prime Minister Ben Chifley regarding the establishment of a domestic motor manufacturing company to challenge the dominance of GMH in the Australian market. The two met on 29 November with the Commonwealth Government favouring the project and being prepared to provide financial assistance.

Hartnett announced the intention to establish Hartnett Motor Company on 7 February 1949 in Chifley's presence. The original plan was to sell 5,000 cars in the first year of production and 10,000 in each subsequent year. A prospectus was issued on 29 August and Hartnett Motor Company was formed on 31 August.

== Manufacturing site ==
Throughout 1949 there was competition from the state governments to attract the manufacturing site of the company. The Government of Victoria and Frankston City Council were the favoured option throughout the year.

In March 1950 the company announced that production would begin in England. They stated that as material and labour became more plentiful in Australia they would move closer to the objective of making the whole car in Australia.

In May 1950 the company announced that all tools, gauges and jigs were ready at a plant in Geelong (Victoria).

In November 1951 Hartnett company director Mr N Goldberg revealed that it had transferred the company production centre from Sydney to Melbourne.

In March 1952 the first Hartnett car produced in Australia was dispatched from its production facility in Frankston.

== Engine development ==
In May 1950 the company announced that it had signed a £500,000 contract with FM Aspin and Co of Bury, England to manufacture and supply engines and gearboxes. An unspecified initial consignment was due to be delivered to Australia in August 1950 with a further 500 engines per month thereafter.

== Design ==
Plans were devised to build a small front wheel drive car based on a prototype two door sedan developed by French designer Jean Grégoire.

The design of the original Gregoire vehicle had been developed into three separate prototypes using the same basic engineering, but with different body styling. The "Panhard" version and the "Simca" version were developed by French interests. The "Kendall" version was adopted in England by Grantham Productions, a company set up to manufacture the car by Denis Kendall who was a Member of Parliament for Grantham. The development of the "Kendall" version that commenced in 1946 had been abandoned by Grantham due to financial difficulties.

The choice to move forward with the Gregoire option was primarily based on the availability of the assets of the former Grantham operation at a significant discount. The whole of the tooling, gauges, jigs, fixtures, patterns, dies and suchlike required for the manufacture of the car were available to be purchased for £30,000. Just two years earlier Grantham had paid £186,000 for these assets.

Hartnett concluded that the availability of these assets would "obviate a delay of up to three years and make production possible within one year of the commencement of a Public Company".

The Hartnett, as it was to be called, utilised aluminium castings rather than the typical steel pressings, both to save weight and to reduce tooling costs. It was fitted with independent suspension on all four wheels and a 594 cc air-cooled, horizontally opposed two-cylinder engine. In 1951 it was announced that the 'Tasman' sedan model would be supplemented by the 'Pacific', a soft-top sports tourer.

== Prototypes ==
In May 1950 the company announced that five prototype vehicles fully made in England were due to arrive in Australia.

== Production models ==
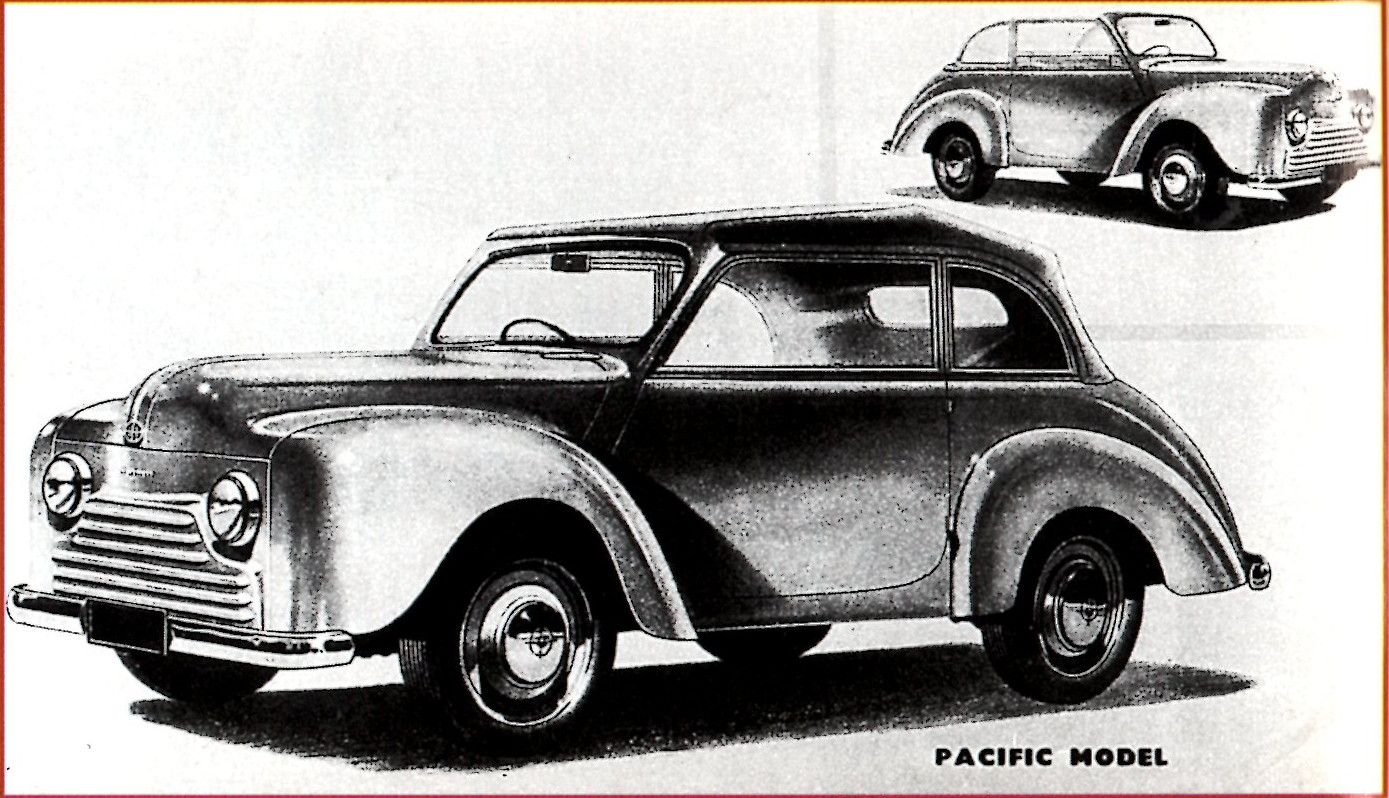
Hartnett Pacific as depicted in publicity material

On 16 March 1951 the company simultaneously revealed the first two production vehicles in Sydney and Melbourne.

The model displayed was an aluminium bodied Pacific Convertible. At the launch Laurence Hartnett announced that this model was to be followed by a sedan model to be known as the Tasman later in the year.

Sixty-eight percent of the vehicle was Australian produced with the imported components comprising the engine, gearbox, instruments and some of the brake fittings.

Almost a year to the day after the initial launch of the first two cars, a further two cars were displayed in Melbourne. They were described as being the first two cars from the Frankston assembly plant. Production was stated as eight cars per week.

On 23 April 1952 the company announced that several cars had been delivered to buyers in Victoria and that more would be completed weekly at the Frankston assembly plant. Production of vehicles ceased in September 1952.

== Pricing ==
The original price of the car had been promoted at less than £300; however, by the time the company was formed and before production had commenced it had already risen to an estimated £430. In January 1950 it was revealed that the car would cost less than £500 inclusive of sales tax. By March 1951 no cars had been delivered and the company revealed that the expected pricing was now £549 plus sales tax" meaning that the total purchase price would be less than £600. The first aluminium bodied Pacific Convertible vehicles sold in April 1952 cost £695 including sales tax.

== Company Failure ==
Laurence Hartnett originally proposed that production of the car could be commenced in less than one year after the incorporation of the company in August 1949. The first production cars were released in April 1952. The production figures of 'several' cars per week fell significantly short of the 400 cars per week originally forecast. Between the launch of the company and the commencement of production there were almost monthly public assurances that the company was successfully overcoming production issues and that full production was only weeks away.

The first public indication that the company faced significant issues was when questions were raised in Federal Parliament. On 28 August 1952 a member of the Labour opposition told the House of Representatives that he had failed to be given answers to two questions by the Government. Firstly he asked why General Motors Holden had been granted a £1 million overdraft from the government owned Commonwealth Bank where the same facility had been refused to the Hartnett Motor Company. Secondly he asked whether the government owned Commonwealth Engineering had obstructed the manufacturing of the Hartnett car by failing to deliver steel body panels that had been on order for over 18 months.

Two weeks later the company called a creditors' meeting and stated that it was in debt £63,779 and that its business was at a standstill and production had ceased. The company claimed that Commonwealth Engineering had failed to deliver 2,000 sets of steel body panels as agreed in May 1950 with delivery commencing by May 1951. By June 1952 the Hartnett Company had not received a single set.

For the first time it was revealed that the company had orders for only 314 cars. Hartnett Motor Company directors including Laurence Hartnett had previously claimed to hold orders for 2,000 cars,

In December 1955 Commonwealth Engineering was ordered to pay the company £37,228 in damages for the non-delivery of the panels. The company had been seeking £170,000.

The Hartnett Motor Company was dissolved at a creditors' meeting in 1956.

== Production statistics ==
The Frankston production plant appears to have been in use between November 1951 until the second week of September 1952. The first cars off the line were in the third week of April 1952 with "several" cars being produced each week. Nineteen weeks of production would equate to about 100 vehicles.

Most of the vehicles were delivered as open tourers, although some with station wagon bodies were also built.

== See also ==
- Lloyd (car) re involvement by Laurence Hartnett in the production of the German Lloyd automobile in Australia as the Lloyd-Hartnett.
