= Laurence Hartnett =

British-Australian engineer

Sir Laurence Hartnett

Director of Holden
- In office March 1934 – December 1946
- Preceded by: Edward Holden
- Succeeded by: Harold Bettle

Personal details
- Born: Laurence John Hartnett; 26 May 1898 Woking, England
- Died: 4 April 1986 (aged 87) Frankston, Victoria, Australia
- Occupation: Engineer businessman

Sir Laurence John Hartnett CBE (26 May 1898 – 4 April 1986) was a British engineer and businessman who made several important contributions to the Australian automotive industry, and is often called "The Father of the Holden". He played a pivotal role in the development of Australia's automotive industry by leading General Motors-Holden during the design and production of the first Australian-made car, the Holden 48-215. Hartnett was also involved in defense production during World War II. His innovative vision and leadership left a lasting legacy in both the automotive and industrial sectors of the country.

== Childhood ==
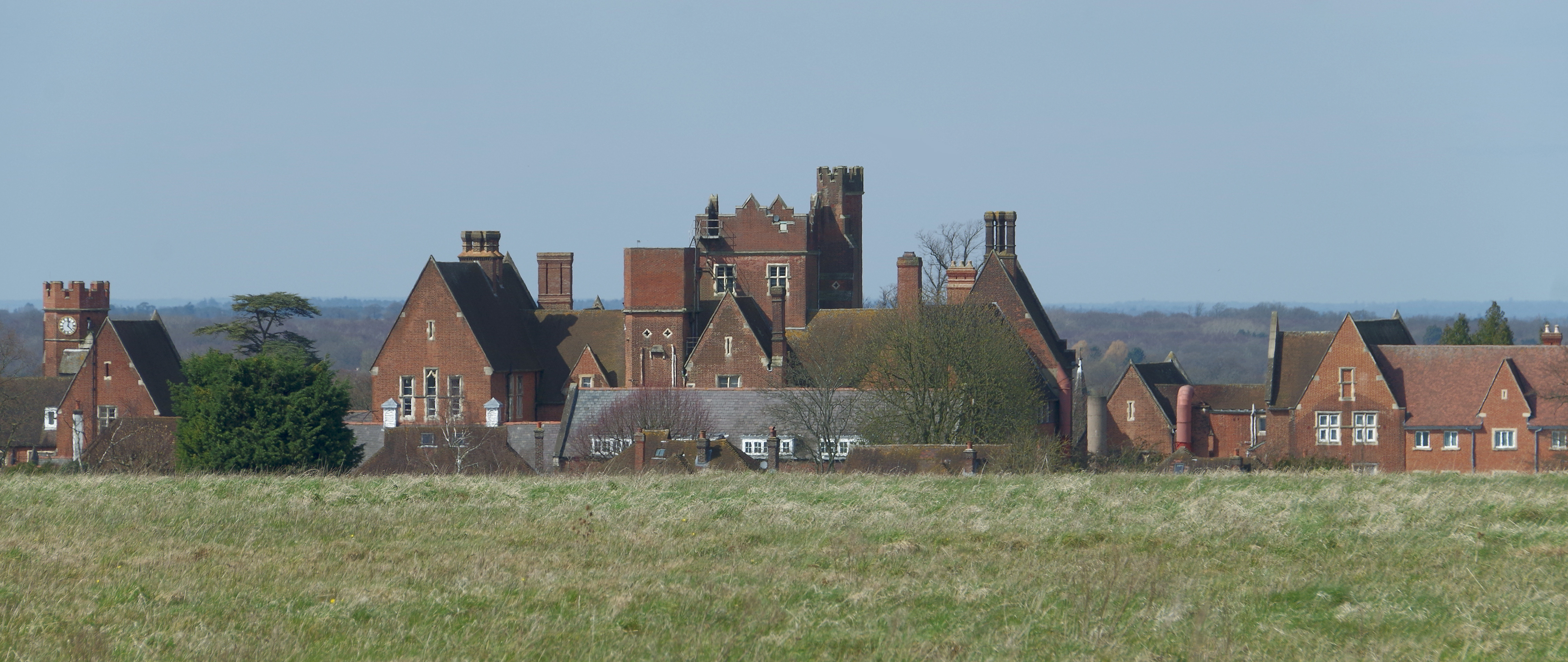
Epsom College

Hartnett was born into a middle-class family in Woking, England. His mother, Katherine Jane Taplin, was the daughter of Wiltshire farmer George Taplin and his wife Kate. His father, Irish born John Joseph Hartnett, was a doctor and inventor of patent medicines from Clonakilty, County Cork, who had an M.D. from Dublin and in 1892 had published a pamphlet on the treatment of tuberculosis. In addition he had invented an inhaling machine by means of which tubercular patients could breathe fresh, dry, medicated air. John Hartnett and Katherine Taplin married in Portsmouth on 1 May 1897 and went to live in Woking where in March of the following year their only child, Laurence (known as Larry) was born. The latter, however, was to retain no memory of his father who died nine months later. Shortly afterwards, mother and son went to live with Katherine's childless sister and brother-in-law for whom Katherine acted as housekeeper, initially in Southsea and then in Kingston-upon-Thames. Larry began his schooling in 1903 in the home of a pair of middle-aged spinsters who taught him and some eight or nine other children in their dining room. From there he graduated two years later to Kingston Grammar School and from 1909 he attended Epsom College, which specialised in educating the sons of doctors who were, themselves, generally destined to enter that profession. Larry had obtained a foundation scholarship, offered to those doctors' sons whose families could not afford the fees. In his first year, the school's Natural History Society created an Aeroplane Section in which he took a close interest, pasting photos of aircraft and newspaper cuttings about aviation into an exercise book as well as making detailed drawings of their parts and participating in the construction of a full-sized glider which the Section launched on a five hundred metre flight in 1912. Epsom was the first school in England to include aeronautical training as an optional extra subject. While College records show that Hartnett did not on the whole shine academically, in 1914 an essay he wrote on China won the Epsom College geography prize for which he received a book called Engineering Today by Thomas Corbin.

== Early career ==
After leaving school in 1915 he became a management apprentice with British arms manufacturer Vickers Ltd, demand for whose products had been heightened by the outbreak of war with Germany in the previous year. In the day-time his training focused on industrial management at the company's Crayford plant while in the evenings he studied theoretical subjects such as metallurgy and mathematics at a nearby technical school. Then in March 1918 he decided to enlist in the war, entering the Royal Naval College at Greenwich as a Probationary Flying Officer, a rank he retained until hostilities ended in the following November. He received practical training at Chingford and Northolt airports before being appointed to Number 304 Bomber Squadron in Shropshire. However, the Armistice was signed before he had been able to fly a single mission. Nevertheless, prior to his return to civilian life, he did do a stint as manager of an Air Force ground transport unit thereby qualifying in Aerodrome Management.

In 1919 he purchased a South London business which he renamed the Wallington Motor Company. In addition to making parts for gas stoves, it bought, sold, hired and repaired bicycles as well as the occasional automobile. Demand for motor cars in England in the immediate aftermath of the war was far greater than the supply and Hartnett increased the automotive side of his new venture by instructing his employees to make inquiries in nearby villages with a view to locating war widows who couldn't drive but whose husbands prior to enlisting had left their cars up on blocks to await their owners' return. He would offer to buy these vehicles, which often needed work done to make them roadworthy, with a view to repairing and reselling them at Wallington Motors. Initially, he was very successful. But then the bubble burst as the economy slowed and motor cars became harder to sell. Already in September 1920, the Wallington Motor Company was forced to take out a £200 bank loan to remain afloat. Three months later, a further £600 was borrowed. Even so, the venture was unable to meet its liabilities, closing its doors for the last time in December 1921.

Undeterred, in the following year, Hartnett set up as an automobile engineer, renting part of a Wallington boot repair shop and dealing in bicycles, motor bikes and cars. But the economy had grown sluggish and when this, too, failed he turned to earning a precarious living as a freelance automotive consultant. He obtained commissions with firms such as the Nyasa Consolidated Company which wanted him to inspect vehicles it was considering buying for its commercial operations in central and east Africa. But the pickings were meager and time weighed on his hands. In 1923 he sold a patent for improving insulators on radio aerials to a ceramics firm.

His next important career move came in March 1923 when he was offered and accepted a job as Automobile Engineer with trading firm Guthrie and Company which administered rubber plantations in southeast Asia as well as importing goods such as tea, alcoholic beverages and motor cars into the region. On his arrival in Singapore two months later he was put in charge of Guthrie and Co's automobile distribution and sales operation in Grange Road. There, he handled mainly Buick cars for which the company had obtained the local franchise from American manufacturer General Motors in the previous February. Hartnett's job was to unload and assemble these vehicles when they arrived by ship and to distribute them to a network of dealers he had appointed and whose activities he supervised throughout the region. He conducted the Singapore dealership himself.

The Grange Road operation flourished as booming worldwide demand for rubber brought prosperity to southeast Asia, greatly increasing demand for motor vehicles. At the same time, Hartnett benefited personally from the boom by speculating in rubber futures as a sideline. He also took an extracurricular interest in commercial radio during this period. When his employer imported a small transmitter, he began broadcasting music and talks from the Grange Road premises for about 15 minutes each day with financial support from local advertisers. However, he had neglected to obtain a licence and the colonial authorities, fearing that such a small, shoestring operation would fail and thereby make it more difficult for any subsequent larger venture to succeed, soon forced him to close down. So, he moved the operation to Johore where the British fiat had less force and whose Sultan initially welcomed it. But it didn't last long there either as pressure exerted on Guthrie and Co by the imperial government in Singapore once more ensured its closure—this time definitively.

Then in 1924, following a change in the composition of Guthrie and Co's London management, Hartnett began to feel that the firm was losing interest in the automotive side of its southeast Asian business. His consequent disaffection grew so that in September of the following year, determined to leave, he wrote to General Motors Export Company seeking employment. Global automobile sales were rapidly expanding at this time due in large part to a general reduction in prices resulting from the adoption of mass production techniques. This in turn had generated a spiralling demand for senior staff to work for automotive exporting companies in markets proliferating throughout the world.

General Motors, which had just sold its five millionth car and had been impressed with Hartnett's success in distributing and selling its Buicks in southeast Asia, now offered him a job as a field representative in southern India. His main function would be to appoint and supervise the work of GM distributors in the Madras district. He accepted the position, resigning from Guthrie and Co on 31 March 1926, and embarked for Calcutta on 10 June accompanied by his wife, Gladys (née Tyler), whom he had met when, as an employee of Vickers Ltd., he had lived with his mother next door to the Tyler family in Bexley Heath. They had married in Singapore on 26 February 1925

He found GM's business in Madras was being conducted in a haphazard manner and he appears to have been successful in improving the situation—so much so that he became one of only four salesmen world wide to win an award in General Motors' 1926 "Prize Contest"—which earned him a large bonus. But, repelled by the poverty he encountered almost everywhere and the rigidity of the Hindu caste system, he felt no desire to remain in India any longer than necessary. It was GM's policy that all senior employees working overseas should spend some time in America studying the relationship between the Corporation's business there and its international operations. So in April 1927, following a bout of malaria and dysentery, Hartnett headed for the US where, during the next five months he focused in particular on gaining a sound working knowledge of automobile manufacturing in Detroit and also took part in various feasibility studies at head office, examining proposals for setting up automobile assembly plants abroad to get around rising foreign tariff barriers.

But he was not to remain long in America. Late in September 1927, he was appointed sales manager of General Motors Nordiska in Stockholm, taking charge of marketing the company's vehicles throughout Sweden and Finland. His horizons were widened when he played a role there in choosing some of the superficial features comprising the outward appearance of the vehicles for whose sale he was responsible—especially their colour. Attention to such external details was becoming increasingly important in determining GM's growing success and senior overseas representatives like Hartnett were given some leeway in choosing them in the light of perceived local preferences. Hartnett would send his staff to interview actual and potential customers in his territory concerning their colour preferences. Then he made recommendations accordingly to the American parent company. Among other things, he found that Finns disliked the colour red, which they associated with the Soviet Union whose aggressive propensities they distrusted. While making use of the glitzy publicity-seeking techniques that were benefiting GM's bottom line in America at that time—such as the much hyped theatrical unveiling of new models as they arrived—he argued that emphasis should be placed on securing customer confidence rather than just making quick profits and to this end he focused heavily on the provision of effective after sales service.

His success in Sweden was rewarded in January 1929 when he was appointed head of the export section of the troubled Vauxhall Motors operation in Luton, England, which GM had acquired four years earlier and which was then operating at a considerable loss. He found a poisonous atmosphere prevailing at Luton where Vauxhall staff seemed consumed by resentment at the American parent company's tendency to interfere with their operations. So, he welcomed the frequent opportunities afforded him as export sales manager for getting away from all this ill humour to familiarise himself with the firm's foreign markets. In September 1929, with his wife and daughter Maureen, he set out on a yearlong round-the-world-trip to acquaint himself with Vauxhall's overseas markets, including in Australia, New Zealand and South Africa.

While Vauxhall, like most businesses, suffered during the Depression, its export arm actually prospered between 1931 and 1933. This was due partly to a sense of loyalty to the mother country among both British nationals abroad and the populations of Britain's overseas dominions. At the same time, it was also a result of the popularity of exported Vauxhall Cadet cars. These were difficult to sell on the home market because their engines had little power as a result of the extremely high British horsepower tax. That tax, however, did not apply to exports, which meant Cadets offered for sale outside Britain were fitted with the new, powerful Bedford Truck engines first manufactured by Vauxhall in 1931 and were therefore very popular in foreign markets. In addition, a significant devaluation of the pound sterling in that year greatly reduced the price of British goods abroad, including cars, while a general shortage of US dollars during the Depression years further inclined foreign buyers to purchase British vehicles.

== General Motors-Holden's ==
Hartnett's success at Vauxhall was no doubt an important factor in General Motors' decision to offer him the post of managing director of the Australian firm General Motors-Holden's Ltd (GMH). This operation had been formed in 1931 when Melbourne-based chassis importer General Motors (Australia) had amalgamated with Adelaide automotive body manufacturer Holden's Motor Body Builders Ltd. The Australian government at this time, bent on diversifying what was still primarily a rural economy, had imposed high duties on fully imported cars. In response, GMH manufactured bodies for its vehicles in Adelaide and imported its chassis parts in unassembled form to assemble them locally.

Arriving in March 1934, to take over his new role at GMH's head office in Melbourne, he found himself almost immediately embroiled in a struggle for control of the Australian operation with the chairman of the board of directors, Edward Holden, whose family had founded the Adelaide motor body building part of the business. With a fair amount of tact and the support both of the American head office and most of the other Australian directors, Hartnett managed to emerge victorious from this conflict and this in turn enabled him to reorganise the company's clumsy administrative structure and to increase its efficiency generally.

He proceeded to consolidate its Melbourne operations which he had found scattered over seven widely separated locations. The main one—the Victorian chassis assembly plant in City Road—occupied a leased building that was too small to keep up with the increasing demand for vehicles as the economy was picking up in the mid 1930s. So, he decided to centralise the firm's dispersed Victorian activities by erecting new, purpose-built accommodation on a vacant Government-owned 50-acre block of land at Fishermans Bend, whose sale required an act of the Victorian Parliament. He made sure that the construction of the new plant on this land received maximum publicity. To open it on 5 November 1936, he secured the services of none other than prime minister Joseph Lyons. The ceremony captured wide attention in Victoria, at least, The Argus devoting sixteen pages to it in addition to its editorial which predicted that it marked the beginning of the city's transformation into "an Australian Coventry".

At the same time, Hartnett became aware of widespread hostility among Australians towards GMH, which many viewed as a ruthless, profiteering American-oriented organisation cynically bent on enriching its mainly US shareholders at the expense of the local community. To combat this mindset, he took every opportunity to portray the company as a patriotic corporate citizen, emphasising particularly the amount of employment it provided, both directly and indirectly, as well as the auxiliary industries it supported and its contribution to Australia's defence potential. In addition, he himself played a high-profile public role in seeking to promote Australian industrial development generally—among other things, by calling for the creation of a national standards laboratory and an aeronautical research facility, while also helping to advance the objectives of the Australian Industries Protection League and advocating a more thorough exploitation of the country's mineral resources and the harnessing of tidal movements in Spencer Gulf for energy generation.

== Commonwealth Aircraft Corporation ==
In the 1930s, his most important contribution outside the automobile industry was in the field of aircraft manufacture. In 1936, together with Essington Lewis, CEO of BHP, W.S. Robinson, joint chairman of Broken Hill Associated Smelters, and Sir Lennon Raws and Sir Harry (later Lord) McGowan of Imperial Chemical Industries—all of whose companies contributed, along with General Motors, to the financing of the venture—he was involved in setting up the Commonwealth Aircraft Corporation, which proceeded to manufacture aircraft on a site at Fishermans Bend. Later known as Wirraways, they were based on a design of the North American Aviation Corporation, a partly owned General Motors subsidiary. When used in the Pacific war, however, they proved to be inferior in dogfights to the highly manoeuvrable Japanese Zeros.

== Wartime Service ==
During that decade, Hartnett also showed a keen interest in Australia's military preparedness and in June 1939 he publicly criticised the United Australia Party government for not doing enough to ensure the country's ability to defend itself in an increasingly dangerous world. This gave rise to a brief slanging match with prime minister Robert Menzies who characterised it as "absurdly incorrect". Nevertheless, in September, when Britain declared war on Germany and Menzies announced that by consequence Australia, too, was at war, Hartnett placed himself at the government's disposal, declaring his readiness to do anything without financial recompense to assist the war effort. The offer was actuated in part by his belief that such generosity would benefit GMH's local business. It also reflected his self-confidence and was an expression of his conviction that as a privileged person he had a responsibility to give something back to the community. That it was accepted indicates the government's recognition of Hartnett's considerable technical, managerial and organisational skills as well as of his World War I experience in the production of arms for Vickers Ltd. As a result, in July 1940, he became Director of Ordnance Production, responsible for the procurement in Australia of weapons and other products such as armoured fighting vehicles, mobile laundries and field kitchens for Australia's military forces. He took particular pride in the pioneering work done by his directorate in the development of optical glass for use in gun sights and related weaponry. Some of the prisms produced for use in instruments such as range finders, submarine periscopes and aerial photography were exported to the US.

At first, there was a considerable amount of conflict between the Directorate and the Army, partly because the latter, which knew little about manufacturing, repeatedly changed its orders thus creating serious problems on the factory floor. In addition, the Army's initial insistence on specifying the precise design of the items it wanted also gave rise to manufacturing difficulties. Hartnett argued that it was up to his Directorate to design the weapons after being told their purpose and how they were to be used. The design, he argued, should be a matter for those responsible for the manufacturing because they alone understood the problems and costs involved, given the nature of the factory resources and the availability of raw materials. Eventually, he carried his point so that by mid 1943 the Army had become much more co-operative in this regard.

As well as taking charge of ordnance production, Hartnett was also made head of the Army Inventions Directorate created by War Cabinet in January 1942 to solicit and evaluate proposals from the general public for improving the fighting efforts of Australia's military forces. While most of the 21,645 suggestions received by this body over the subsequent three and a half years were dismissed out of hand as impracticable, 3,686 were sent to an expert advisory panel for closer consideration and 127, including a process for water-proofing maps and a container for safely dropping supplies from aircraft, were finally accepted for production.

Also in January 1942, as Japanese forces were heading southward down the Malay peninsula towards Singapore, Hartnett offered to forestall them by flying to the island, himself, gathering up valuable machine tool gauging equipment left there and bringing it back to Australia before the enemy's arrival. The offer was accepted but he got no further than Darwin before the mission was called off and Singapore fell to the invader.

In recognition of these wartime contributions, following the cessation of hostilities in 1945 he was made a Commander of the Order of the British Empire.

== Manufacturing an Australian car ==
A small number of motor cars had been produced in Australia by a few enterprising individuals even before the end of the 19th century and between the wars, to avoid increasingly heavy import duties imposed by governments anxious to promote industrial employment, a number of Australian firms were already manufacturing replacement parts—which, however, were of generally poor quality. In addition, to avoid high import tariffs the major American auto exporters, including General Motors, were building their vehicle bodies locally and importing their chassis in unassembled form, assembling them in Australia. They didn't, however, want the enormous additional expense of manufacturing entire vehicles there.

Hartnett, by contrast, desired nothing more than to head such a manufacturing operation in his adopted land. So, while publicly supporting GM's policy, privately he did his best to undermine it by persuading cabinet ministers and senior public servants of the feasibility of that course, making it clear, however, that GM would not do it unless sufficient pressure was applied. The government was certainly interested as Australia's industrial competence had increased enormously during the war due to the necessity of manufacturing a wide range of precision products for the fighting services. Furthermore, post-war motor vehicle manufacturing promised to provide many jobs for returning service personnel while the necessary acquisition of the accompanying skills and industrial infrastructure would help build up the country's defence capacity.

Accordingly, Hartnett warned his American directors that the Australian government was determined to have cars manufactured locally and might, itself, establish a factory for that purpose if private industry proved unwilling. To enhance the credibility of this threat, he sent his New York head office letters which he had asked J.K. Jensen, chairman of the government's Secondary Industries Commission, to write to him, saying the government was resolved to force the creation of the industry. He even supplied Jensen with proposed drafts of such letters. And he warned GM that to head off the prospect of a state-owned industry, Ford and/or Chrysler, would very likely become anxious to erect their own Australian factories for the purpose—which, if GM did nothing, would result in a substantial reduction in demand for the corporation's imported cars. It was mainly this that changed General Motors Corporation's mind. But whether that represented a personal triumph for Hartnett's powers of skulduggery and persuasion or whether he had simply said what was already obvious to the American directors is open to debate.

== Life after GMH ==
Hartnett continued to make important contributions to Australian motoring after he left GMH. He instigated an ambitious venture to build a uniquely Australian car, the Hartnett, based on a design by Frenchman, Jean Gregoire. The Hartnett was a front wheel drive design, with an air cooled, 600cc, horizontally opposed twin-cylinder engine. The venture failed, after problems with the supplier of the aluminium body panels. Approximately 120 cars were produced between 1949 and 1955, and few of these survive today.

Then, in 1957, he was involved in production of the Lloyd-Hartnett car, based on a German design. This venture also experienced misfortune, as Borgward, the German supplier of parts for the car, suffered financial problems.

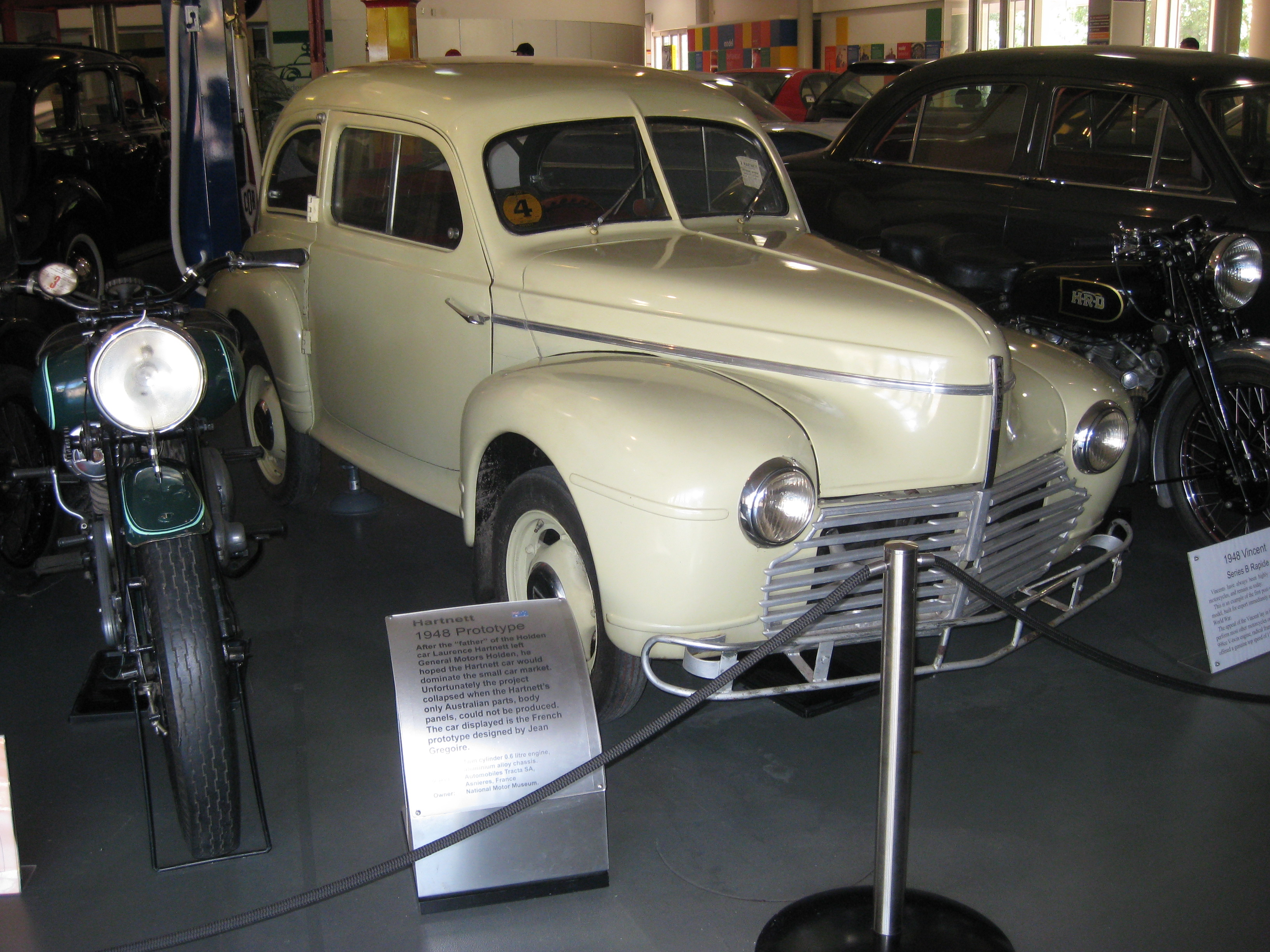
The 1948 prototype of the Hartnett

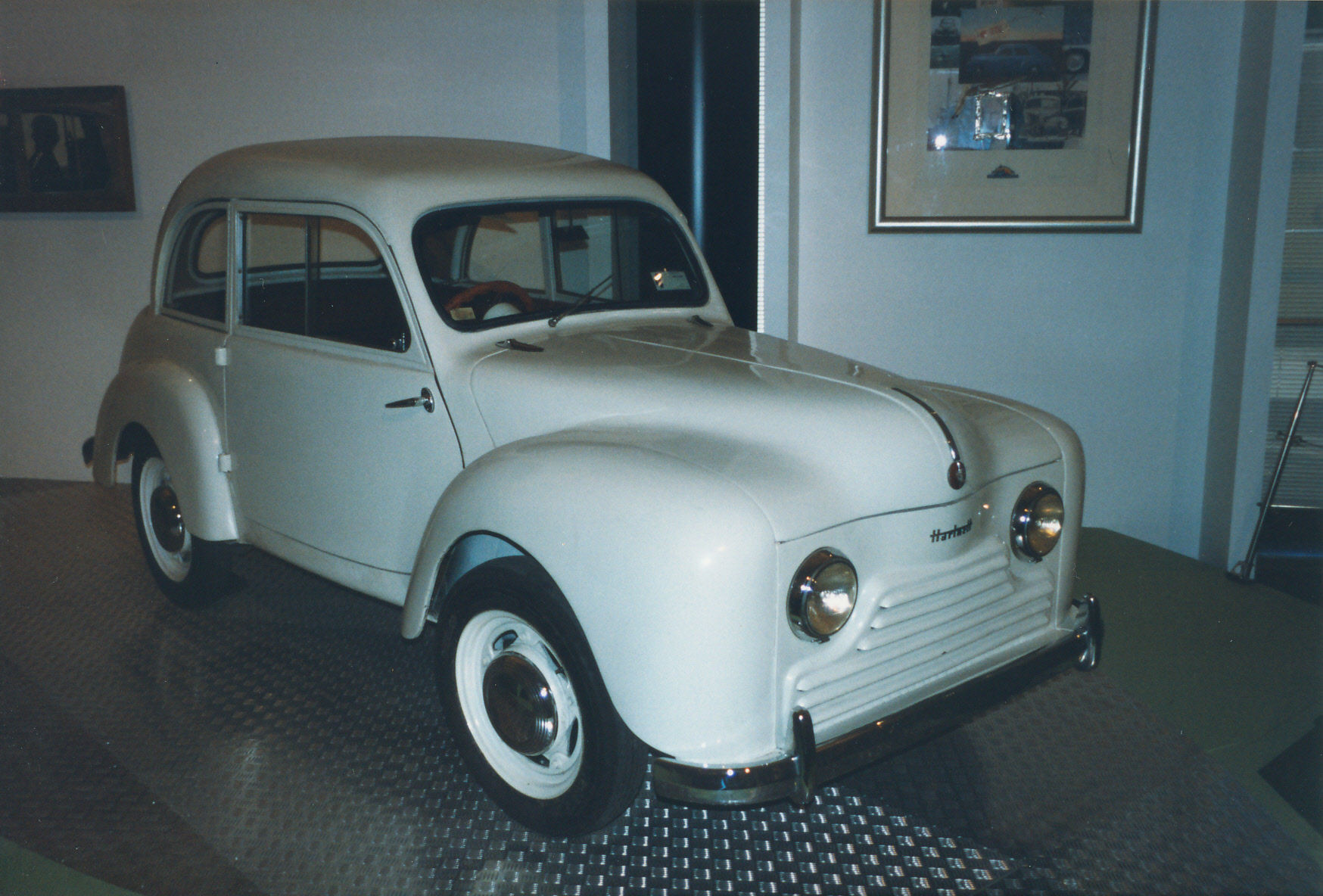
Hartnett Tasman 2-door sedan

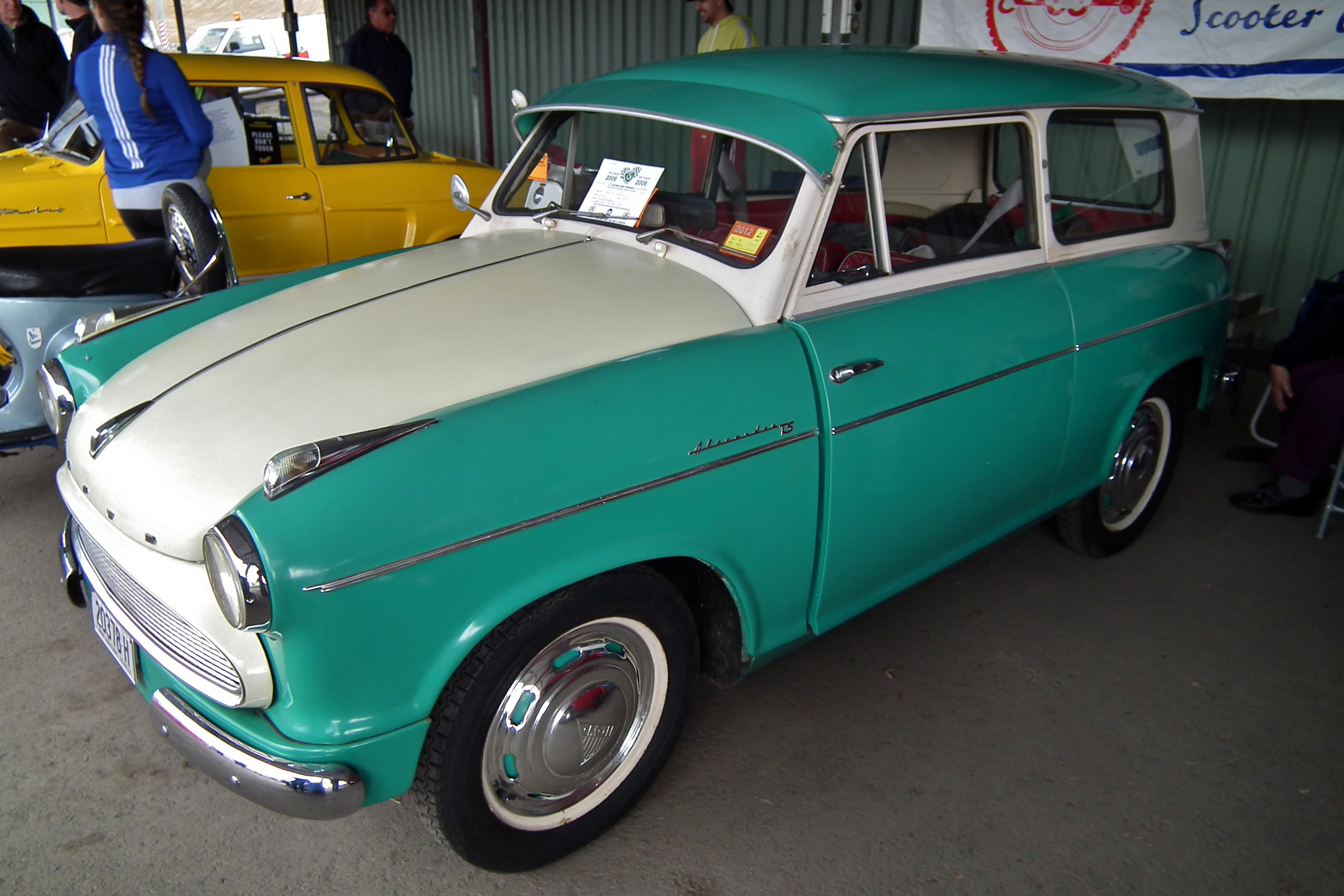
Lloyd-Harnett Alexander

== Promotion of Nissan ==
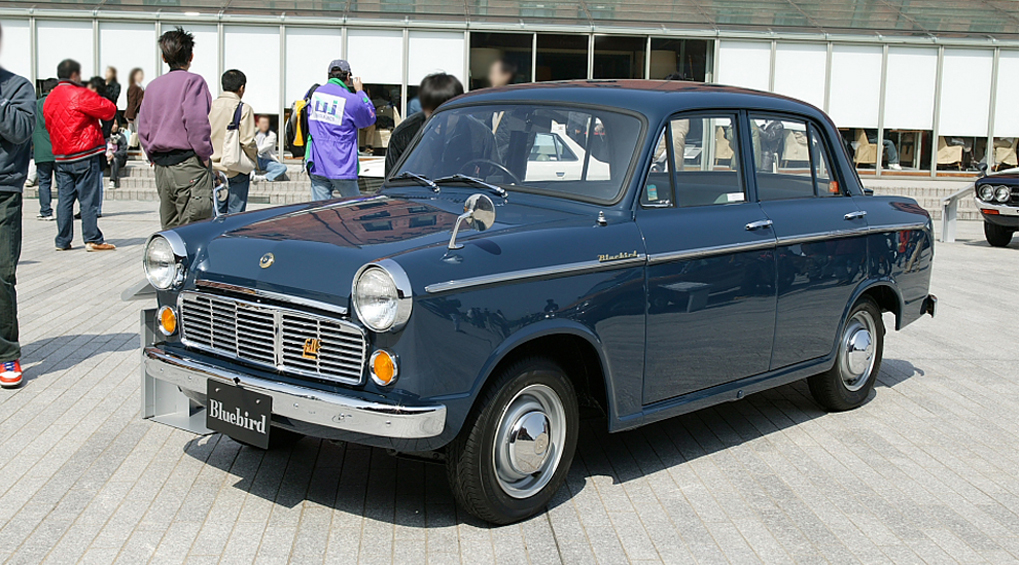
Datsun Bluebird

Hartnett's luck changed in 1960, when he saw a new Japanese car – the Datsun Bluebird – on display at the Melbourne Motor Show. Hartnett commenced importing the Datsun to Australia, pioneering the importation of Japanese cars to Australia. This became a successful venture, and Hartnett was responsible for popularising the Datsun brand in Australia.

In 1966, Hartnett sought to establish local production of Nissan cars, but this was not successful. Nissan went on to assemble cars from CKD kits at the Pressed Metal Corporation plant in Sydney, followed in 1976 by assembly at the Melbourne factory where Volkswagen cars were once produced. Eventually, Nissan did commence full production of cars in Australia. This arrangement continued until 1992, when the Melbourne plant was closed in favour of importing cars direct from Japan.

== Honours ==
On New Year's Day 1945 Hartnett was appointed a Commander of the Order of the British Empire (CBE).

In 1965, in honour of Sir Laurence Hartnett, the Society of Automotive Engineers Australasia established the annual Hartnett Award as an award for an outstanding original contribution to automotive or aeronautical engineering knowledge or practice.

He was knighted in the Queen's Birthday Honours of June 1967.

== Hartnett's legacy ==
Hartnett has left a legacy of playing a crucial role in the introduction of two of Australia's best selling brands of cars – Holden and Nissan.
