= Mayflower II =

Replica of the 17th-century ship Mayflower

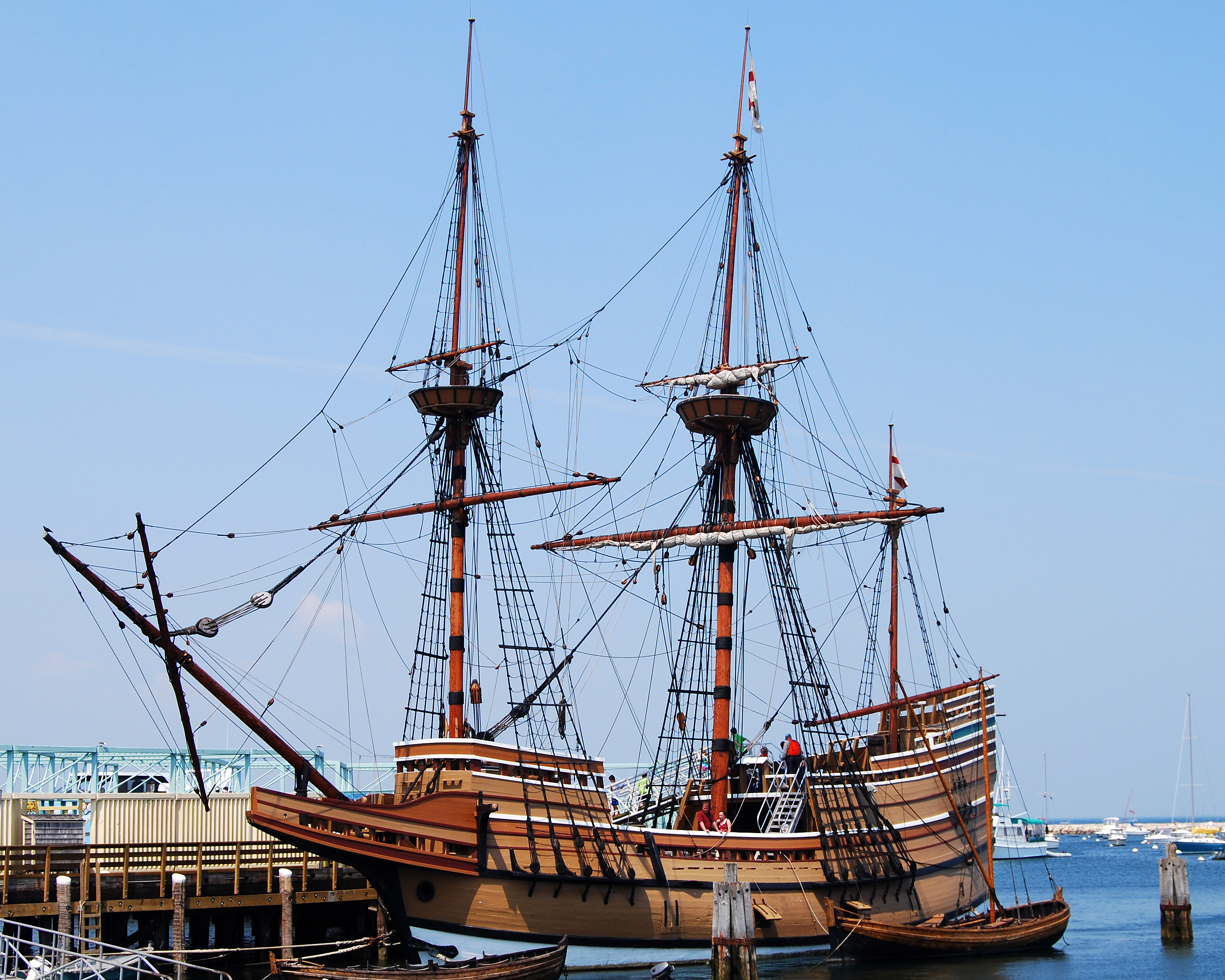
- Mayflower II at State Pier in Plymouth, Massachusetts, 2006

History

United States
- Name: Mayflower II
- Namesake: Mayflower
- Owner: Plimoth Patuxet
- Builder: Upham Shipyard, Brixham, Devon
- Laid down: July 27, 1955
- Launched: September 22, 1956
- Christened: by Stewart Upham & Reis Leming
- Status: Museum ship

General characteristics
- Displacement: 238 long tons (242 t)
- Length: 106 ft 6 in (32.46 m) overall; 90 ft (27 m) hull
- Beam: 25 ft 6 in (7.77 m)
- Draft: 13 ft (4.0 m)
- Sail plan: 3-masted ship
- Armament: 2 × 3-pounder minion stern chasers

Mayflower II is a reproduction of the 17th-century ship Mayflower, celebrated for transporting the Pilgrims to the New World in 1620. The reproduction was built in Devon, England during 1955–1956, in a collaboration between Englishman Warwick Charlton and Plimoth Patuxet (at the time known as Plimoth Plantation), a living history museum. The work drew upon reconstructed ship blueprints held by the American museum, along with hand construction by English shipbuilders using traditional methods. Mayflower II was sailed from Plymouth, Devon on April 20, 1957, recreating the original voyage across the Atlantic Ocean, under the command of Alan Villiers. According to the ship's log, Mayflower II arrived at Plymouth on June 13; it was towed up the East River into New York City on Monday, July 1, 1957, where Villiers and crew received a ticker-tape parade. The ship was listed on the US National Register of Historic Places in 2020.

The ship was built at the Upham Shipyard in Brixham and financed by private donations in England and Plimoth Plantation. It represented the alliance between the United Kingdom and the United States for collaboration during the Second World War. The ship is considered a faithful generic reproduction within a few details (electric lights added and ladder replaced with a lower-deck staircase), with solid oak timbers, tarred hemp rigging, and hand-coloured maps. It is 106 ft (32 m) long by 25 ft (7.6 m) wide, 236 tons displacement, three masts (mainmast, foremast, mizzen), a bowsprit and 6 sails.

The ship is seaworthy and sailed to Providence, Rhode Island in 2002. In December 2012, Mayflower II was towed to dry dock at Fairhaven Shipyard in Fairhaven, Massachusetts for Coast Guard inspection as well as repairs. The repairs took longer than originally planned because unexpected damage was discovered during the inspection. Repairs were eventually completed and Mayflower II returned to her berth in Plymouth, Massachusetts, on August 7, 2013. In December 2015, the ship arrived at the Henry B. duPont Preservation Shipyard at the Mystic Seaport in Mystic, CT for restoration. The ship returned temporarily to Plymouth for the 2016 summer season and has returned permanently in 2020, just in time for the 400th anniversary of the pilgrims' arrival.

== History ==
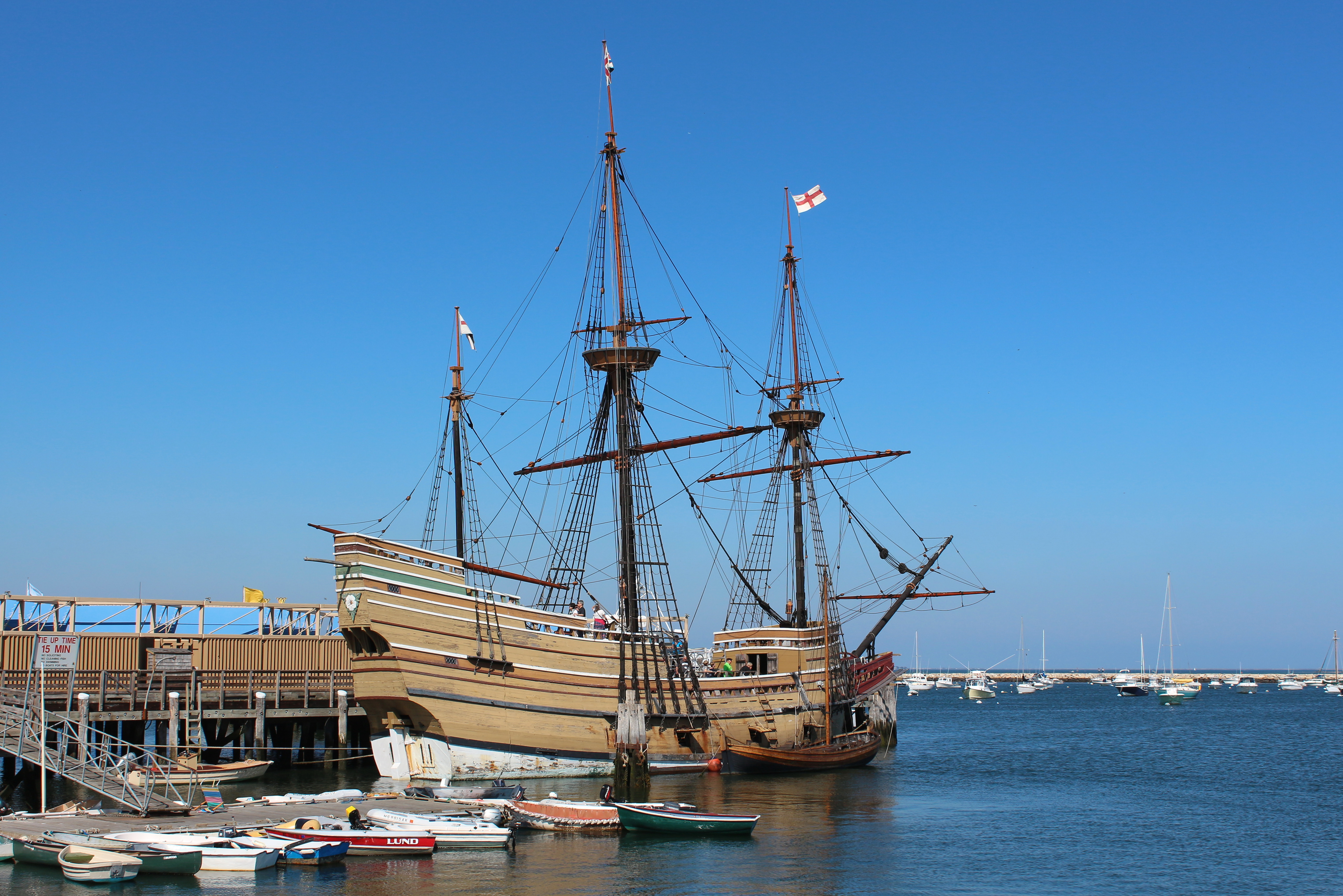
In Plymouth Harbor, Massachusetts

In August 1954, Warwick Charlton, conceived the idea to construct a reproduction of Mayflower to commemorate the wartime cooperation between the United Kingdom and the United States. He had served alongside many American allies in the North African theatre during World War II. Project Mayflower was created in 1955 to build a replica of Mayflower in England and sail the ship to the United States as a symbol of Anglo-American friendship.

The project's sponsors wanted to ensure proper siting of the ship after it reached the United States. They were aware that earlier reproduction vessels had rotted away after interest in their initial voyages faded. Project Mayflower learned of the Plimoth Plantation museum, and John Lowe of Project Mayflower, came to the United States in March 1955. He met with representatives of Plimoth Plantation to gain assistance in future berthing and exhibition of Mayflower II.

Plimoth Plantation had planned years earlier to add a replica of Mayflower to its exhibits. In 1951, the museum had already commissioned plans for a Mayflower II from naval architect William A. Baker of MIT. Baker's detailed plans had been finished by the time that Project Mayflower announced its goals. A waterline model of the vessel's hull had also been built, but nothing more.

By the spring of 1955, the two organizations negotiated an agreement: in exchange for using Baker's design plans and advice, plus the Plimoth Plantations' guarantee to maintain and exhibit the vessel permanently, Project Mayflower agreed to build Mayflower II and sail her across the Atlantic Ocean, visiting various East Coast ports to exhibit the ship. The Project would then release it to Plimoth Plantation.

The construction of Mayflower II was conducted at the Upham shipyard in Brixham, Devon, England. The ship's keel was laid on July 27, 1955, and William A. Baker was sent by Plimoth Plantation to advise the builders and view the progress of the ship's construction.

The ship was replicated as accurately as possible, with carefully chosen English oak timbers, hand-forged nails, hand-sewn linen canvas sails, hemp cordage, and the Stockholm tar of the type used on 17th-century ships. Mayflower II has the brown hull and the dark-red strapwork ornamentation of 17th-century merchant ships, based on analysis of the traditional colors and designs of English merchant ships illustrated in Dutch and English paintings. Carved into the stern of Mayflower II is a blossom of a hawthorne or English mayflower. In England, the skills of elderly traditional workmen were employed to build a vessel that reflected Baker's detailed research which could sail the Atlantic as securely as the original ship.

Mayflower II was launched on September 22, 1956, a rainy day. The ceremony was based on knowledge about christenings of 17th-century vessels. The ship was toasted from a gold loving cup that was afterward thrown into the water, and then quickly retrieved by an underwater diver, in the traditional manner. The ship slid gracefully down the ways to enter Brixham harbor with a large splash.

She was towed round to Plymouth, Devon, and on April 20, 1957 towed from there to begin her transatlantic voyage. Her captain, Commander Alan Villiers, soon decided that with her somewhat slender spars and authentic 17th century rigging, which lacked the later bobstay to hold the bowsprit steady, she might not make a direct route against the Atlantic storms without being dismasted. He altered course southwards and followed the trade winds in a wide southerly loop before sailing up the east coast of America, where on June 8 off Bermuda she met the one real gale of the crossing. She lay to all night and weathered it without loss, and made land at Provincetown, where the original Mayflower had first put in, on June 12. Among the crew was Peter Padfield, who went on to become a naval historian.

Since 1957, Mayflower II has been a pier side tourist attraction, moored at Frazier State Pier near the site of Plymouth Rock. The ship has been a popular attraction near Boston; it has become the site of national and state celebrations.

On Thanksgiving 1970 (the 350th anniversary of Mayflower landing), members of the American Indian Movement (AIM) led by Russell Means seized Mayflower II in protest against the United States government's failure to abide by treaties with American Indians and its poor treatment of them.

Mayflower II has shared her pier with the paddle-wheel harbor excursion boat Pilgrim Belle since the latter was built in 1993.

=== 21st century events ===
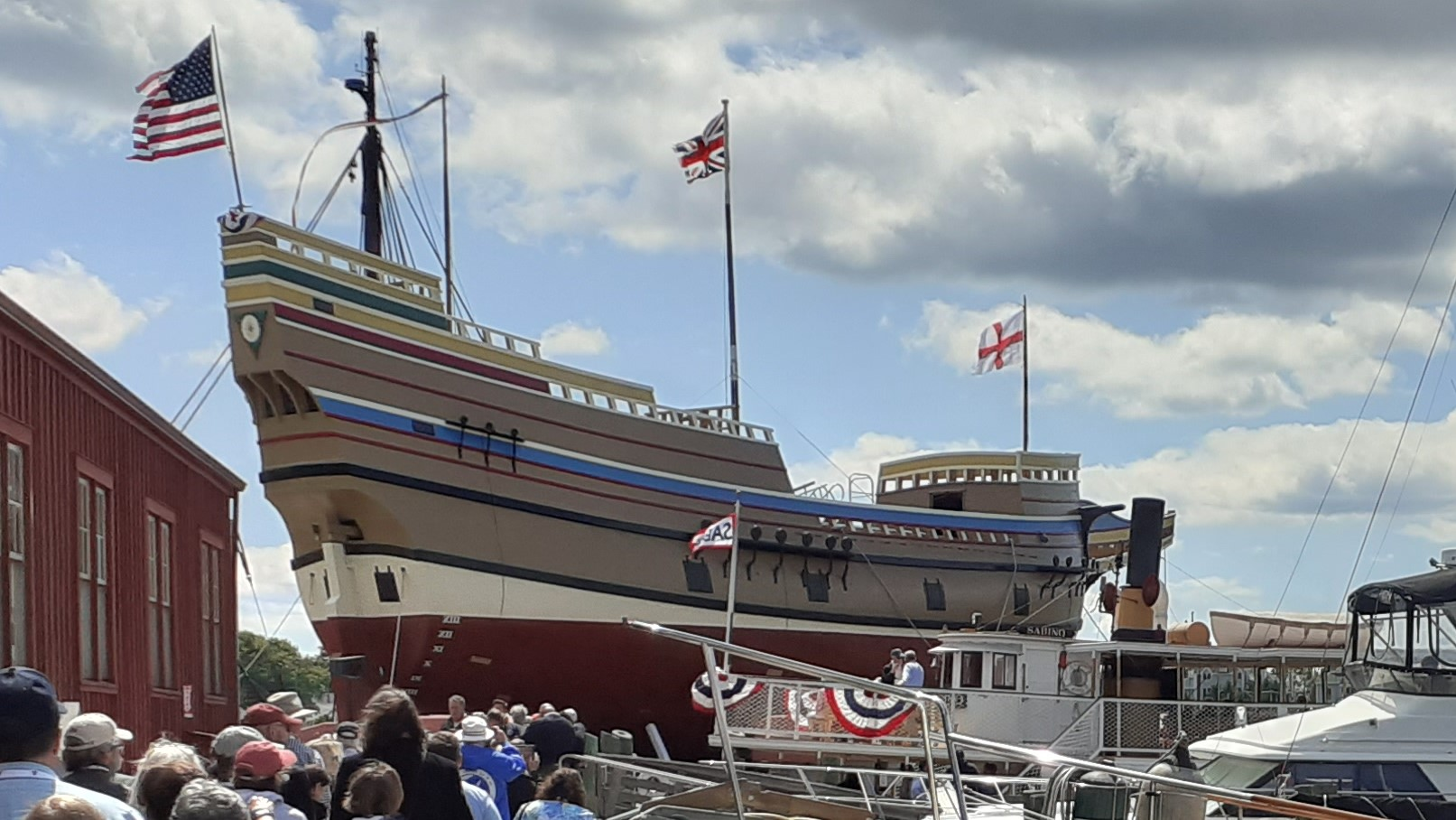
The refurbished Mayflower II awaiting launch.

In December 2012, Mayflower II was towed to dry dock in Fairhaven Ship Yard in Fairhaven, Massachusetts, where shipbuilders and U.S. Coast Guard inspectors called for extensive repairs. This was the first in a number of scheduled repairs over the next seven years to restore Mayflower II to pristine condition for the 400th anniversary of the English settlement of Plymouth in 2020. Expected costs for these repairs were expected to exceed two million dollars.

Starting in December 2014 and continuing until 2020, Mayflower II spent its summers in Plymouth on display and winters at the Mystic Seaport being restored. It left Plymouth on November 1, 2016 and again sailed through the Cape Cod Canal. On September 7, 2019, the ship was launched in a public ceremony, and spent several further months at the shipyard before its first voyage, to Boston, in May 2020.

== See also ==
- Ship replica (including a list of replicas)
