= Bella Terra Publishing =

Publishing company based in Rhinebeck, New York

Bella Terra Publishing LLC
- Type: Private
- Industry: Publishing
- Predecessor: Harnett House
- Founded: (December 2008; 17 years ago) in Howes Cave, New York
- Founders: Eric Riback and Bella Stander
- Headquarters: Rhinebeck, NY, US
- Products: Maps; Illustrations
- Website: www.bellaterramaps.com

Bella Terra Publishing LLC is a publishing company based in Rhinebeck, New York. The company specializes in maps of the states as well as guides to lighthouses and covered bridges.

In December 2008 Bella Terra came into existence by purchasing its predecessor, the map publishing company Hartnett House of Howes Cave, New York. The owners are a husband-and-wife team, Eric Riback and Bella Stander. They spent several years researching historic trains and existing lighthouses in order to produce their specialized line of publications. The company's offerings include maps, guidebooks, brochures, and posters.
