= Foreign relations of the United Kingdom =

The diplomatic foreign relations of the United Kingdom are conducted by the Foreign, Commonwealth and Development Office, headed by the foreign secretary. The prime minister and numerous other agencies set policy, and many institutions and businesses have a voice and a role to play.

The United Kingdom was the world's foremost power during the 19th and early 20th centuries, most notably during the so-called "Pax Britannica"—a period of unrivaled supremacy and unprecedented international peace during the mid-to-late 1800s. The country continued to be widely considered a superpower until the Suez Crisis of 1956, and the dismantling of the British Empire gradually diminished the UK's dominant role in global affairs. Nevertheless, the United Kingdom remains a great power and a permanent member of the United Nations Security Council. The UK is a founding member of AUKUS, the Commonwealth, the Council of Europe, the European Court of Human Rights, the G7, the G20, the International Criminal Court, NATO, the OECD, the OSCE, the World Health Organization, and the World Trade Organization, additionally the UK is a member of CPTPP. The UK was also a founding member state of the European Union, however due to the outcome of a 2016 membership referendum, proceedings to withdraw from the EU began in 2017 and concluded when the UK formally left the EU on 31 January 2020, and the transition period on 31 December 2020 with an EU trade agreement. Since the vote and the conclusion of trade talks with the EU, policymakers have begun pursuing new free trade agreements with other global partners.

In March 2026, the UK government announced that it would make deep cuts to its foreign aid budget, including a 56% reduction in bilateral aid to African countries, as funds are redirected toward defence spending.

== History ==
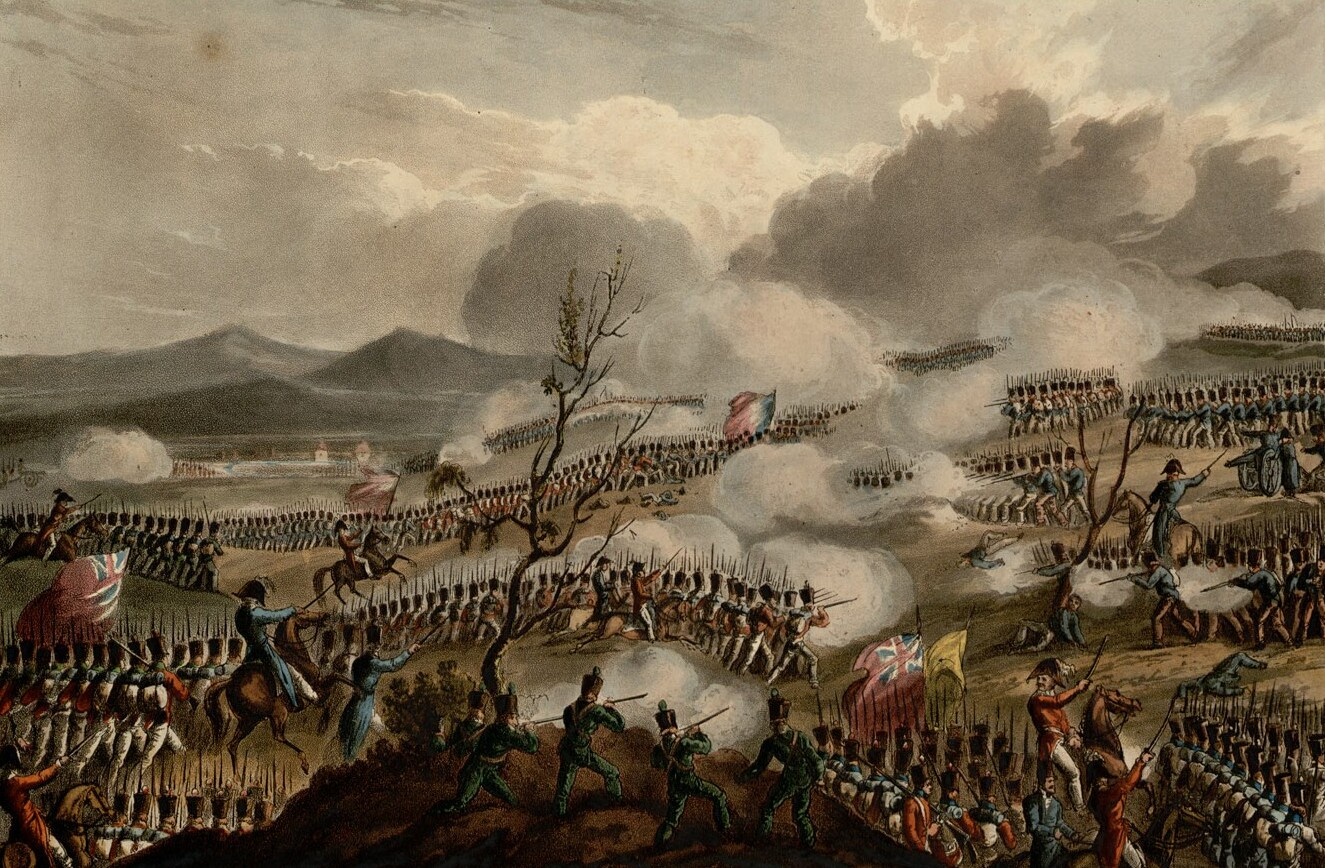
The Battle of Nivelle—a Peninsular War battle between the French and the British armies in France in 1813

Following the formation of the Kingdom of Great Britain (which united England and Scotland) in 1707, British foreign relations largely continued those of the Kingdom of England. British foreign policy initially focused on achieving a balance of power in Europe, with no single country dominating the continent's affairs. This policy remained a major justification for Britain's wars against Napoleon, and for British involvement in the First and Second World Wars. Secondly, Britain continued to expand its colonial "First British Empire" through migration and investment.

France was the chief enemy until Napoleon's defeat in 1815. It had a much larger population and a more powerful army, but a weaker navy. The British were generally successful in their many wars. The notable exception, the American War of Independence (1775–1783), saw Britain, without any major allies, defeated by the American colonials who had the support of France, the Netherlands, and (indirectly) Spain. A favoured British diplomatic strategy involved subsidising the armies of continental allies (such as Prussia), thereby turning London's enormous financial power to military advantage. Britain relied heavily on its Royal Navy for security, seeking to keep it the most powerful fleet afloat, eventually with a full complement of bases worldwide. British dominance of the seas was vital to the formation and maintenance of the British Empire, achieved by maintaining a navy larger than the next two largest navies combined before 1920. The British generally stood alone until the early 20th century, when they became friendly with the US and made alliances with Japan, France, Russia, and Germany, their former antagonist, now an ally.

=== 1814–1914 ===
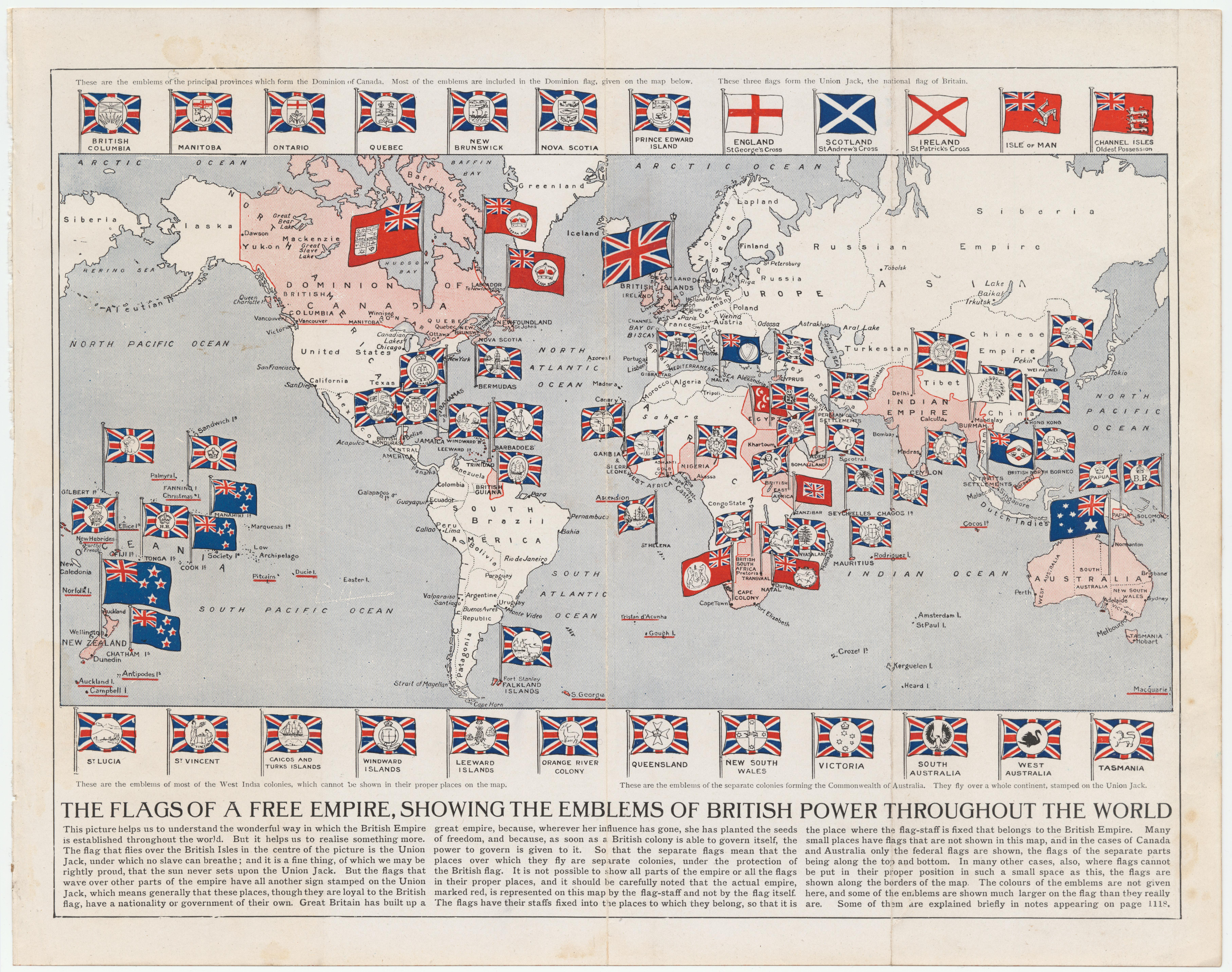
Map of the British Empire (as of 1910). At its height, it was the largest empire in history.

The 100 years were generally peaceful—a sort of Pax Britannica enforced by the Royal Navy. There were two important wars, both limited in scope. The Crimean War (1853–1856) saw Russia's defeat and ended its threat to the Ottoman Empire. The Second Boer War (1899–1902) saw the defeat of the two Boer republics in South Africa, and the Boxer Rebellion happened the same year. London became the world's financial centre, and commercial enterprise expanded across the globe. The "Second British Empire" was built with a base in Asia (especially India) and Africa.

=== 1920s ===
After 1918, Britain was a "troubled giant" that was less of a dominant diplomatic force in the 1920s than before. It often had to give way to the United States, which frequently exercised its financial superiority. The main themes of British foreign policy included a leading role at the Paris Peace Conference of 1919–1920, where Lloyd George worked hard to moderate French demands for revenge on Germany. He was partly successful, but Britain soon had to moderate French policy toward Germany further, as in the Locarno Treaties of 1925. Furthermore, Britain obtained "mandates" that allowed it and its dominions to govern most of the former German and Ottoman colonies.

Britain became an active member of the new League of Nations, but its list of major achievements was slight.

Disarmament was high on the agenda, and Britain played a major role, following the United States, at the Washington Naval Conference of 1921 in working toward naval disarmament among the major powers. By 1933, disarmament agreements had collapsed, and the issue became rearming for a war against Germany.

Britain was partially successful in negotiating better terms with the United States regarding the large war loans which Britain was obliged to repay. Britain supported the international solution to German reparations through the Dawes Plan and the Young Plan. After the Dawes Plan had helped stabilize Germany's currency and lowered its annual payments, Germany was able to pay its annual reparations using money borrowed from New York banks, and Britain used the money received to pay Washington. The Great Depression starting in 1929 put enormous pressure on the British economy. Britain revived Imperial Preference, which meant low tariffs within the British Empire and higher barriers to trade with outside countries. The flow of money from New York dried up, and the system of reparations and debt payments died in 1931.

In British domestic politics, the emerging Labour Party had a distinctive and suspicious foreign policy rooted in pacifism. Its leaders believed that peace was impossible because of capitalism, secret diplomacy, and the arms trade. Labour stressed material factors, ignoring the psychological memories of the Great War and the highly emotional tensions surrounding nationalism and national boundaries. Nevertheless, party leader Ramsay MacDonald devoted much of his attention to European policies.

=== 1930s ===
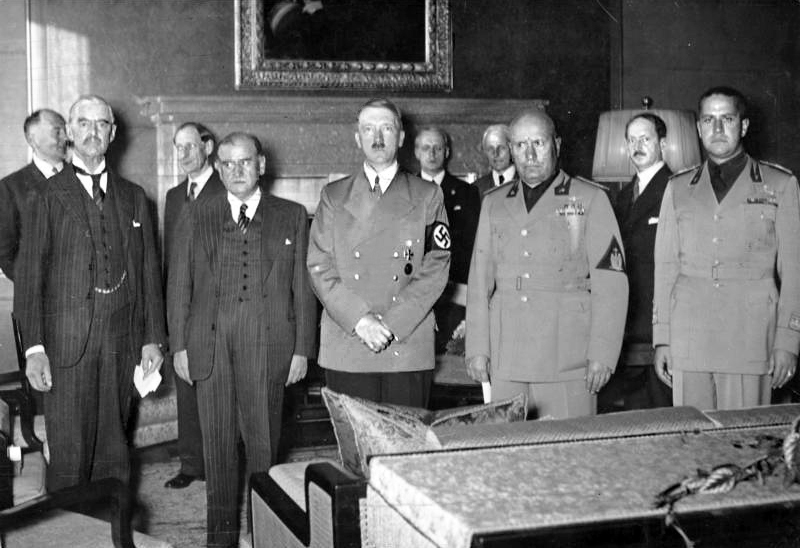
Chamberlain, Daladier, Hitler, and Mussolini pictured before signing the 1938 Munich Agreement, which gave the Sudetenland to Nazi Germany

Vivid memories of the horrors and deaths of the First World War inclined many Britons—and their leaders in all parties—to pacifism in the interwar era. This led directly to the appeasement of dictators (notably Mussolini and Hitler) to avoid their threats of war.

The challenge came from those dictators, first from Benito Mussolini, Duce of Italy, then from Adolf Hitler, Führer of a much more powerful Nazi Germany. The League of Nations proved disappointing to its supporters; it failed to resolve any of the threats posed by the dictators. British policy involved "appeasing" them in the hope that they would be satisfied. By 1938, it was clear that war was looming and that Germany had the world's most powerful military. The final act of appeasement came when Britain and France sacrificed Czechoslovakia to Hitler's demands at the Munich Agreement of September 1938. Instead of satiation, Hitler menaced Poland, and at last Prime Minister Neville Chamberlain dropped appeasement and stood firm in promising to defend Poland (31 March 1939). Hitler, however, cut a deal with Joseph Stalin to divide Eastern Europe (23 August 1939); when Germany did invade Poland in September 1939, Britain and France declared war, and the British Commonwealth followed London's lead.

=== Second World War ===
Having signed the Anglo-Polish military alliance in August 1939, Britain and France declared war against Germany in September 1939 in response to Germany's invasion of Poland. This declaration included the Crown colonies and India, which were directly controlled by Britain. The dominions were independent in foreign policy, though all quickly entered the war against Germany. After the French defeat in June 1940, Britain and its empire stood alone in combat against Germany until June 1941. The United States provided diplomatic, financial, and material support, starting in 1940, especially through Lend Lease, which began in 1941 and reached full strength in 1943. In August 1941, Churchill and Roosevelt met and agreed on the Atlantic Charter, which proclaimed "the rights of all peoples to choose the form of government under which they live" should be respected. This wording was ambiguous and would be interpreted differently by the British, Americans, and nationalist movements.

Starting in December 1941, Japan overran British possessions in Asia, including Hong Kong, Malaya, and especially the key base at Singapore. Japan then marched into Burma, headed toward India. Churchill's reaction to the United States' entry into the war was that Britain was now assured of victory, and the future of the empire was safe. Still, the rapid defeats irreversibly harmed Britain's standing and prestige as an imperial power. The realisation that Britain could not defend them pushed Australia and New Zealand into permanent close ties with the United States.

=== Postwar ===
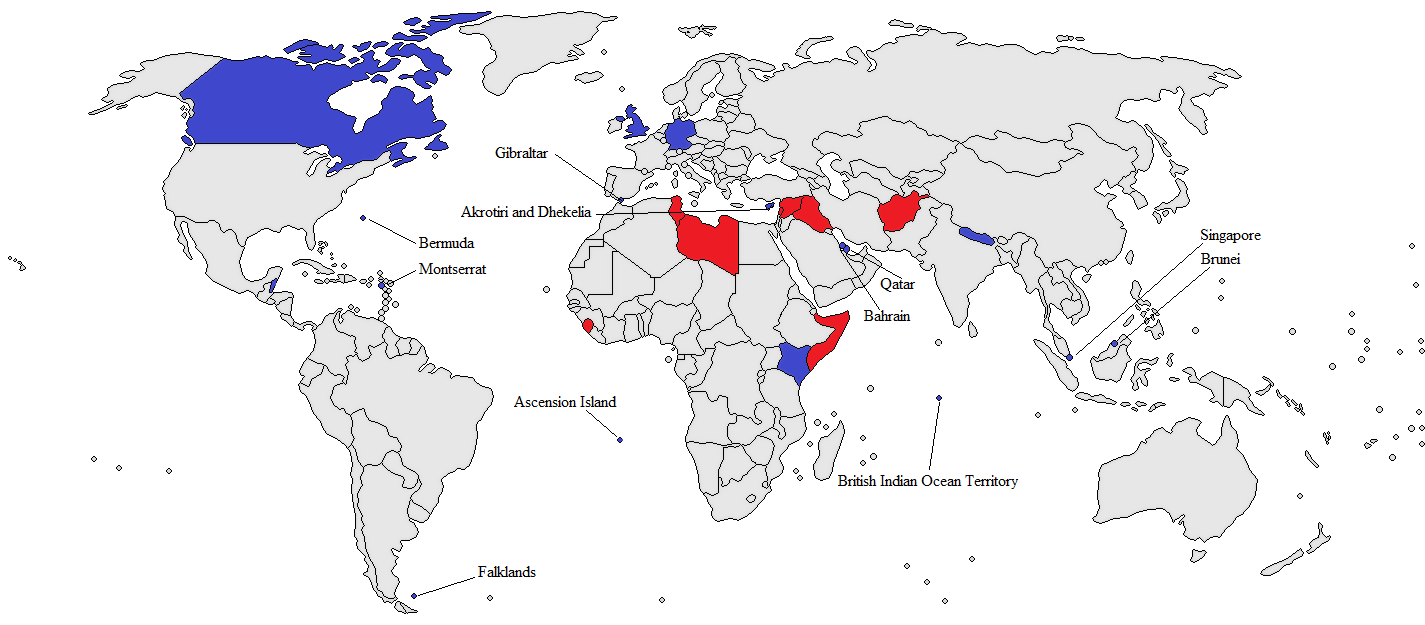
Overseas military bases in 2016 (blue) and military interventions since 2000 (red)

Economically in dire straits in 1945 (saddled with debt and dealing with widespread destruction of its infrastructure), Britain systematically reduced its overseas commitments. It pursued an alternate role as an active participant in the Cold War against communism, especially as a founding member of NATO in 1949.

The British had built up a very large worldwide Empire, which peaked in size in 1922, after more than half a century of unchallenged global supremacy. The cumulative costs of fighting two world wars, however, placed a heavy burden upon the home economy. After 1945, the British Empire rapidly disintegrated, with all the major colonies gaining independence. By the mid-to-late 1950s, the UK's status as a superpower had been eclipsed by the United States and the Soviet Union. Most former colonies joined the "Commonwealth of Nations", an organisation of fully independent nations now with equal status to the UK. However it attempted no major collective policies. The last major colony, Hong Kong, was handed over to China in 1997. Fourteen British Overseas Territories maintain a constitutional link to the UK, but are not part of the country per se.

Britain slashed its involvements in the Middle East after the humiliating Suez Crisis of 1956. However, Britain forged close military ties with the United States, France, and Germany through NATO. After years of debate (and rebuffs), Britain joined the Common Market in 1973, which became the European Union in 1993. However it did not merge financially, and kept the pound separate from the Euro, which partly isolated it from the Euro area crisis. In June 2016, the UK voted to leave the EU.

=== 21st century ===
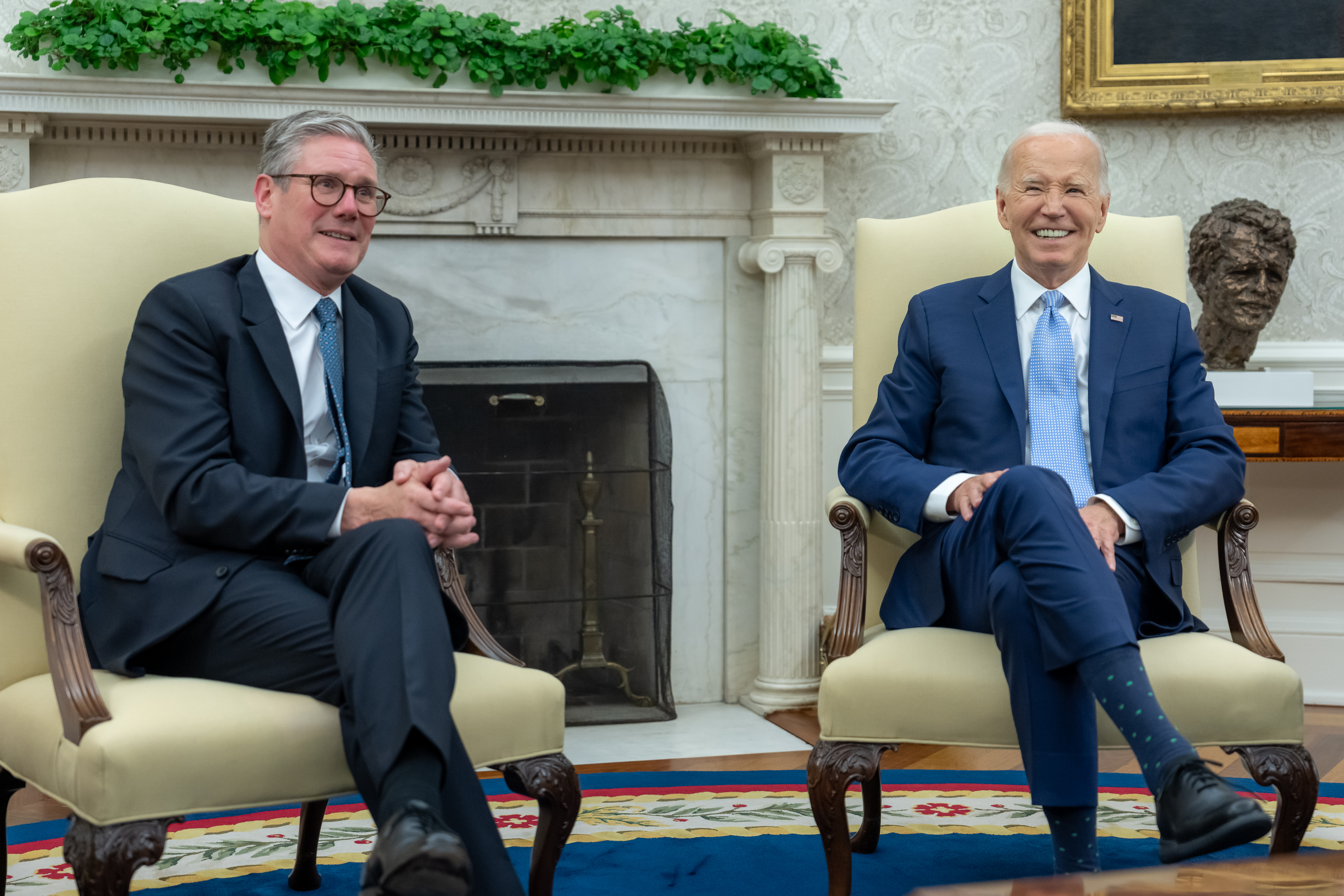
UK Prime Minister Keir Starmer with US President Joe Biden at the White House, July 2024

Foreign policy initiatives of UK governments since the 1990s have included military intervention in conflicts and for peacekeeping, humanitarian assistance programmes and increased aid spending, support for establishment of the International Criminal Court, debt relief for developing countries, prioritisation of initiatives to address climate change, and promotion of free trade. The British approach has been described as "spread the right norms and sustain NATO".

Lunn et al. (2008) argue:

Three key motifs of Tony Blair's 10-year premiership were an activist philosophy of 'interventionism', maintaining a strong alliance with the US and a commitment to placing Britain at the heart of Europe. While the 'special relationship' and the question of Britain's role in Europe have been central to British foreign policy since the Second World War...interventionism was a genuinely new element.

The GREAT campaign of 2012 was one of the most ambitious national promotion efforts ever undertaken by any major nation. It was scheduled to take maximum advantage of the worldwide attention to the Summer Olympics in London. The goals were to make British culture more visible to stimulate trade, investment, and tourism. The government partnered with key leaders in culture, business, diplomacy, and education. The campaign unified many themes and targets, including business meetings, scholarly conventions, recreational vehicle dealers, parks and campgrounds, convention and visitors bureaus, hotels, bed-and-breakfast inns, and casinos.

In 2013, the government of David Cameron described its approach to foreign policy by saying:

For any given foreign policy issue, the UK potentially has a range of options for delivering impact in our national interest. ... [W]e have a complex network of alliances and partnerships through which we can work.... These include – besides the EU – the UN and groupings within it, such as the five permanent members of the Security Council (the "P5"); NATO; the Commonwealth; the Organisation for Economic Cooperation and Development; the G8 and G20 groups of leading industrialised nations; and so on.

The UK began establishing air and naval facilities in the Persian Gulf, located in the United Arab Emirates, Bahrain, and Oman in 2014–15. The Strategic Defence and Security Review 2015 highlighted a range of foreign policy initiatives of the UK government. Edward Longinotti notes how current British defence policy is grappling with how to accommodate two major commitments, to Europe and to an ‘east of Suez’ global military strategy, within a modest defence budget that can only fund one. He points out that Britain's December 2014 agreement to open a permanent naval base in Bahrain underlines its gradual re-commitment east of Suez. By some measures, Britain remains the second most powerful country in the world by virtue of its soft power and "logistical capability to deploy, support and sustain [military] forces overseas in large numbers." Although commentators have questioned the need for global power projection, the concept of "Global Britain" put forward by the Conservative government in 2019 signalled more military activity in the Middle East and Pacific, outside of NATO's traditional sphere of influence.

At the end of January 2020, the United Kingdom left the European Union, with a subsequent trade agreement with the EU in effect from 1 January 2021, setting out the terms of the UK-EU economic relationship and what abilities the Foreign, Commonwealth & Development Office can use in foreign relations related to trade.

== Diplomatic relations ==
British diplomatic relations date back to the 13th century. The United Kingdom has established diplomatic relations with all United Nations members, aside from Bhutan, in addition to three Non-UN member states: the Holy See, Kosovo and Palestine. Moreover, the UK established official relations with the Sovereign Military Order of Malta on 9 October 2024. The following table lists the date from which diplomatic relations were established with other countries:

List of diplomatic relations of the United Kingdom
Country	Date	source
Portugal	9 May 1386	
France	1396	
Denmark	1401	
Spain	April 1509	
Russia	24 August 1553	
Netherlands	10 August 1585	
Sweden	23 December 1653	
United States	1 June 1785	
Iran	5 June 1807	
Nepal	4 March 1816	
Chile	14 September 1823	
Peru	10 October 1823	
Argentina	2 February 1825	
Colombia	18 April 1825	
Brazil	1825	
Haiti	1826	
Mexico	26 December 1826	
Greece	21 November 1828	
Belgium	1 December 1830	
Uruguay	21 February 1833	
Venezuela	15 August 1835	
Guatemala	12 June 1837	
Bolivia	29 September 1840	
Costa Rica	28 February 1848	
Honduras	16 June 1849	
Liberia	1 August 1849	
Dominican Republic	6 March 1850	
Ecuador	29 January 1853	
Paraguay	4 March 1853	
Thailand	18 April 1855	
Japan	26 August 1858	
Nicaragua	18 January 1859	
Italy	13 April 1859	
Serbia	7 February 1870	
Bulgaria	23 July 1879	
Romania	20 February 1880	
El Salvador	1883	
Luxembourg	8 June 1891	
Switzerland	1891	
Ethiopia	14 May 1897	
Cuba	20 May 1902	
Norway	6 November 1905	
Panama	9 April 1908	
Australia	22 January 1910	
Egypt	19 December 1914	
Finland	28 March 1918	
Czech Republic	26 October 1918	
Poland	15 July 1919	
Austria	8 November 1919	
Hungary	22 May 1921	
Albania	9 November 1921	
Afghanistan	22 November 1921	
Ireland	6 December 1922	
Turkey	2 September 1924	
Canada	1 July 1926	
Saudi Arabia	20 May 1927	
South Africa	10 March 1931	
Iraq	4 October 1932	
New Zealand	March 1939	
Iceland	8 May 1940	
Lebanon	9 February 1942	
Syria	9 February 1942	
Jordan	17 June 1946	
Philippines	4 July 1946	
Sri Lanka	22 October 1946	
Myanmar	7 July 1947	
India	14 August 1947	
Pakistan	14 August 1947	
South Korea	18 January 1949	
Indonesia	19 December 1949	
Israel	28 April 1950	
Yemen	20 January 1951	
Germany	20 June 1951	
Libya	24 December 1951	
Cambodia	5 May 1952	
China	17 June 1954	
Laos	5 September 1955	
Sudan	3 March 1956	
Tunisia	19 June 1956	
Morocco	28 June 1956	
Ghana	6 March 1957	
Malaysia	31 August 1957	
Guinea	28 May 1959	
Cameroon	1 February 1960	
Togo	27 April 1960	
Madagascar	27 June 1960	
Democratic Republic of the Congo	7 July 1960	
Somalia	7 July 1960	
Cyprus	1 October 1960	
Senegal	20 August 1960	
Nigeria	1 October 1960	
Benin	6 October 1960	
Burkina Faso	6 October 1960	
Niger	6 October 1960	
Ivory Coast	12 October 1960	
Mauritania	28 November 1960	
Chad	9 December 1960	
Central African Republic	9 December 1960	
Republic of the Congo	9 December 1960	
Gabon	9 December 1960	
Mali	22 March 1961	
Sierra Leone	April 1961	
Kuwait	22 September 1961	
Tanzania	9 December 1961	
Burundi	1 July 1962	
Rwanda	1 July 1962	
Jamaica	2 August 1962	
Trinidad and Tobago	31 August 1962	
Uganda	9 October 1962	
Algeria	1962	
Mongolia	23 January 1963	
Kenya	1963	
Malawi	6 July 1964	
Malta	21 September 1964	
Zambia	17 October 1964	
Gambia	1 January 1965	
Maldives	26 July 1965	
Singapore	9 August 1965	
Guyana	26 May 1966	
Botswana	30 September 1966	
Barbados	30 November 1966	
Lesotho	4 October 1966	
Mauritius	12 March 1968	
Eswatini	6 September 1968	
Equatorial Guinea	20 June 1969	
Tonga	4 June 1970	
Samoa	September 1970	
Fiji	10 October 1970	
Oman	21 May 1971	
Bahrain	21 August 1971	
United Arab Emirates	6 December 1971	
Bangladesh	4 February 1972	
Qatar	24 May 1972	
Bahamas	10 July 1973	
Vietnam	11 September 1973	
Grenada	7 February 1974	
Guinea-Bissau	12 March 1975	
Mozambique	27 August 1975	
Papua New Guinea	16 September 1975	
Suriname	31 March 1976	
Seychelles	29 June 1976	
Cape Verde	17 May 1977	
Comoros	3 October 1977	
Angola	14 October 1977	
Nauru	1 December 1977	
Djibouti	25 January 1978	
Solomon Islands	7 July 1978	
Tuvalu	1 October 1978	
Dominica	3 November 1978	
Saint Lucia	1979	
Kiribati	12 July 1979	
Saint Vincent and the Grenadines	27 October 1979	
São Tomé and Príncipe	3 December 1979	
Zimbabwe	18 April 1980	
Vanuatu	30 July 1980	
Belize	21 September 1981	
Antigua and Barbuda	1 November 1981	
Holy See	16 January 1982	
Saint Kitts and Nevis	19 September 1983	
Brunei	1 January 1984	
Namibia	21 March 1990	
Lithuania	4 September 1991	
Estonia	5 September 1991	
Latvia	5 September 1991	
Ukraine	10 January 1992	
Slovenia	15 January 1992	
Tajikistan	15 January 1992	
Moldova	17 January 1992	
Kazakhstan	19 January 1992	
Armenia	20 January 1992	
Turkmenistan	23 January 1992	
Belarus	27 January 1992	
Marshall Islands	2 February 1992	
Liechtenstein	6 February 1992	
Uzbekistan	18 February 1992	
Azerbaijan	11 March 1992	
Bosnia and Herzegovina	13 April 1992	
Georgia	27 April 1992	
Kyrgyzstan	12 June 1992	
Croatia	24 June 1992	
Federated States of Micronesia	31 August 1992	
Slovakia	1 January 1993	
Eritrea	16 November 1993	
North Macedonia	16 December 1993	
Andorra	9 March 1994	
Palau	16 August 1996	
San Marino	18 November 1998	
North Korea	12 December 2000	
Timor-Leste	2002	
Montenegro	13 June 2006	
Monaco	21 September 2007	
Kosovo	18 February 2008	
South Sudan	9 July 2011	
Palestine	5 January 2026	

== Bilateral relations ==
=== Africa ===
Country	Since	Notes
Algeria	1962	See Algeria–United Kingdom relations Prime Minister David Cameron with Algerian Prime Minister Abdelmalek Sellal in Algeria, January 2013 The UK established diplomatic relations with Algeria in 1962.: Algeria maintains an embassy in London.; The United Kingdom is accredited to Algeria through its embassy in Algiers.; Both countries share common membership of the United Nations, the World Health Organization, and the World Trade Organization. Bilaterally, the two countries have a Double Tax Convention, and a Strategic Partnership.
Angola	1977	See Angola–United Kingdom relations Foreign Secretary David Lammy with Angolan President João Lourenço in Brussels, June 2025 The UK established diplomatic relations with Angola on 14 October 1977.: Angola maintains an embassy in London.; The United Kingdom is accredited to Angola through its embassy in Luanda.; Both countries share common membership of the Atlantic Co-operation Pact, the United Nations, the World Health Organization, and the World Trade Organization. Bilaterally the two countries have a High Level Prosperity Partnership.
Benin	1960	See Benin–United Kingdom relations The UK established diplomatic relations with Benin on 6 October 1960, then known as Dahomey.: Benin does not maintain an embassy in the United Kingdom.; The United Kingdom is not accredited to Benin through an embassy; the UK develops relations through its high commission in Accra, Ghana.; Both countries share common membership of the Atlantic Co-operation Pact, the International Criminal Court, the United Nations, and the World Trade Organization. Bilaterally the two countries have an Investment Agreement.
Botswana	1966	See Botswana–United Kingdom relations Foreign Secretary William Hague in Botswana, February 2012 The UK established diplomatic relations with Botswana on 30 September 1966.: Botswana maintains a high commission in London.; The United Kingdom is accredited to Botswana through its high commission in Gaborone.; The UK governed Botswana from 1885 to 1966, when it achieved full independence. Both countries share common membership of the Commonwealth, the International Criminal Court, the United Nations, and the World Trade Organization, as well as the SACUM–UK Economic Partnership Agreement. Bilaterally the two countries have a Double Tax Convention.
Burkina Faso	1960	See Foreign relations of Burkina Faso Deputy Prime Minister Nick Clegg with Burkinabé President Blaise Compaoré in London, January 2011 The UK established diplomatic relations with Burkina Faso on 6 October 1960, then known as Upper Volta.: Burkina Faso does not maintain an embassy in the United Kingdom.; The United Kingdom is not accredited to Burkina Faso through an embassy; the UK develops relations through its high commission in Accra, Ghana.; Both countries share common membership of the International Criminal Court, the United Nations, and the World Trade Organization.
Burundi	1962	See Foreign relations of Burundi The UK established diplomatic relations with Burundi on 1 July 1962.: Burundi maintains an embassy in London.; The United Kingdom is accredited to Burundi through its embassy office in Bujumbura.; Both countries are members of the United Nations and the World Trade Organization. Bilaterally the two countries have an Investment Agreement.
Cameroon	1960	See Cameroon–United Kingdom relations Foreign Office Minister Mark Simmonds with Cameroonian Prime Minister Pierre Moukoko Mbonjo, September 2013 The UK established diplomatic relations with Cameroon on 1 February 1960.: Cameroon maintains a high commission in London.; The United Kingdom is accredited to Cameroon through its high commission in Yaoundé.; The UK governed the western part of Cameroon from 1916 to 1961, when it joined the Federal Republic of Cameroon. Both countries share common membership of the Commonwealth, the United Nations, and the World Trade Organization. Bilaterally, the two countries have an Economic Partnership Agreement.
Cape Verde	1977	See Foreign relations of Cape Verde The UK established diplomatic relations with Cape Verde on 17 May 1977.: Cape Verde does not maintain an embassy in the UK.; The United Kingdom is not accredited to Cape Verde through an embassy; the UK develops relations through its embassy in Lisbon, Portugal.; Both countries share common membership of the International Criminal Court, the United Nations, the World Health Organization, and the World Trade Organization.
Central African Republic	1960	See Foreign relations of the Central African Republic The UK established diplomatic relations with the Central African Republic on 9 December 1960.: The Central African Republic does not maintain an embassy in the UK.; The United Kingdom is not accredited to the Central African Republic through an embassy; the UK develops relations through its embassy in Kinshasa, DR Congo.; Both countries share common membership of the International Criminal Court, the United Nations, and the World Trade Organization.
Chad	1960	See Foreign relations of Chad Foreign Secretary David Lammy in Chad, January 2025 The UK established diplomatic relations with Chad on 9 December 1960.: Chad does not maintain an embassy in the UK.; The United Kingdom is accredited to Chad through its embassy in N'Djamena.; Both countries share common membership of the International Criminal Court, the United Nations, and the World Trade Organization. Bilaterally the two countries have a Development Partnership.
Comoros	1977	See Foreign relations of the Comoros The UK established diplomatic relations with the Comoros on 3 October 1977.: The Comoros does not maintain an embassy in the UK.; The United Kingdom is not accredited to the Comoros through an embassy; the UK develops relations through its embassy in Antananarivo, Madagascar.; Both countries share common membership of the International Criminal Court, the United Nations, the World Health Organization, and the World Trade Organization, as well as the Eastern and Southern Africa–UK Economic Partnership Agreement.
Democratic Republic of the Congo	1960	See Democratic Republic of the Congo–United Kingdom relations Foreign Secretary James Cleverly with Congolese President Felix Tshisekedi in London, October 2022 The UK established diplomatic relations with the Democratic Republic of the Congo on 7 July 1960.: The Democratic Republic of the Congo maintains an embassy in London.; The United Kingdom is accredited to the Democratic Republic of the Congo through its embassy in Kinshasa.; Both countries share common membership of the International Criminal Court, the United Nations, and the World Trade Organization. Bilaterally, the two countries have a Development Partnership.
Djibouti	1978	See Foreign relations of Djibouti Foreign Secretary William Hague with Foreign Minister Mahamoud Ali Youssouf in London, May, 2013 The UK established diplomatic relations with Djibouti on 25 January 1978.: Djibouti does not maintain an embassy in the UK.; The United Kingdom is accredited to Djibouti through its embassy in Djibouti.; Both countries share common membership of the International Criminal Court, the United Nations, and the World Trade Organization.
Egypt	1914	See Egypt–United Kingdom relations Prime Minister Rishi Sunak with Egyptian President Abdel Fattah el-Sisi at COP27 in Sharm El Sheikh, October 2023 The UK established diplomatic relations with Egypt on 19 December 1914.: Egypt maintains an embassy in London.; The United Kingdom is accredited to Egypt through its embassy in Cairo.; The UK governed Egypt from 1882 to 1956, when it achieved full independence. Both countries share common membership of the United Nations, the World Health Organization, and the World Trade Organization. Bilaterally the two countries have an Association Agreement, a Development Partnership, and a Double Taxation Convention.
Equatorial Guinea	1969	See Foreign relations of Equatorial Guinea The UK established diplomatic relations with Equatorial Guinea on 20 June 1969.: Equatorial Guinea does not maintain an embassy in the United Kingdom; the Equatoguinean government closed its embassy in London.; The United Kingdom is not accredited to Equatorial Guinea through an embassy; the UK develops relations through its high commission in Yaoundé, Cameroon.; Both countries are members of the Atlantic Co-operation Pact and the United Nations.
Eritrea	1993	See Eritrea–United Kingdom relations The UK established diplomatic relations with Eritrea on 16 November 1993.: Eritrea maintains an embassy in London.; The United Kingdom is accredited to Eritrea through its embassy in Asmara.; The UK governed Eritrea from 1941 to 1952, when Eritrea united with Ethiopia into a federation. Both countries share common membership of the United Nations.
Eswatini	1968	See Eswatini–United Kingdom relations The UK established diplomatic relations with Eswatini on 6 September 1968.: Eswatini maintains a high commission in London.; The United Kingdom is accredited to Eswatini through its high commission in Mbabane.; The UK governed Eswatini from 1903 to 1968, when it achieved full independence. Both countries share common membership of the Commonwealth, the United Nations, and the World Trade Organization, as well as the SACUM–UK Economic Partnership Agreement. Bilaterally the two countries have a Double Tax Convention, an Investment Agreement.
Ethiopia	1841	See Ethiopia–United Kingdom relations Prime Minister Winston Churchill with Ethiopian Emperor Haile Selassie in 10 Downing Street, October 1954 The UK established diplomatic relations with Ethiopia in 1841.: Ethiopia maintains an embassy in London.; The United Kingdom is accredited to Ethiopia through its embassy in Addis Ababa.; The UK governed Ethiopia from 1941 to 1942. The UK continued to govern the regions of Ogaden and Haud from 1941 until both territories were relinquished to Ethiopia in 1948 and 1955, respectively. Both countries share common membership of the United Nations. Bilaterally the two countries have a Development Partnership, a Double Taxation Convention, and an Investment Agreement.
Gabon	1960	See Gabon–United Kingdom relations Foreign Secretary William Hague with Gabonese President Ali Bongo in London, February 2014 The UK established diplomatic relations with Gabon on 9 December 1960.: Gabon maintains a high commission in London.; The United Kingdom is accredited to Gabon through an honoury consul in Libreville.; Both countries share common membership of the Atlantic Co-operation Pact, the Commonwealth, the International Criminal Court, the United Nations, and the World Trade Organization.
Gambia	1965	See The Gambia–United Kingdom relations The UK established diplomatic relations with the Gambia on 1 January 1965.: The Gambia maintains a high commission in London.; The United Kingdom is accredited to the Gambia through its high commission in Banjul.; The UK governed the Gambia from 1816 to 1965, when The Gambia achieved full independence. Both countries share common membership of the Atlantic Co-operation Pact, the Commonwealth, the International Criminal Court, the United Nations, the World Health Organization, and the World Trade Organization. Bilaterally the two countries have a Double Taxation Convention, and an Investment Agreement.
Ghana	1957	See Ghana–United Kingdom relations Prime Minister Andy Burnham with Ghanianian President John Mahama at a Commonwealth summit in Antigua, November 2026 The UK established diplomatic relations with Ghana on 6 March 1957.: Ghana maintains a high commission in London.; The United Kingdom is accredited to Ghana through its high commission in Accra.; The UK governed Ghana from 1821 to 1957, when Ghana achieved full independence. Both countries share common membership of the Atlantic Co-operation Pact, the Commonwealth, the International Criminal Court, the United Nations, and the World Trade Organization. Bilaterally the two countries have a Development Partnership, an Interim Trade Partnership Agreement, a High Level Prosperity Partnership, and an Investment Agreement.
Guinea	1959	See Foreign relations of Guinea The UK established diplomatic relations with Guinea on 28 May 1959.: Guinea maintains an embassy in London.; The United Kingdom is accredited to Guinea through its embassy in Conakry.; Both countries share common membership of the Atlantic Co-operation Pact, the International Criminal Court, the United Nations, and the World Trade Organization.
Guinea-Bissau	1975	See Foreign relations of Guinea-Bissau Bissau-Guinean Prime Minister Nuno Gomes Nabiam signs a book of condolence in memory of Queen Elizabeth II at Lancaster House, September 2022 The UK established diplomatic relations with Guinea-Bissau on 12 March 1975.: Guinea-Bissau does not maintain an embassy in the United Kingdom.; The United Kingdom is not accredited to Guinea-Bissau through an embassy; the UK develops relations through its embassy in Dakar, Senegal.; The UK governed parts of Guinea-Bissau from 1792 to 1870, when it was ceded to Portugal. Both countries are members of the Atlantic Co-operation Pact, the United Nations, the World Health Organization, and the World Trade Organization.
Ivory Coast	1960	See Ivory Coast–United Kingdom relations Foreign Office Minister Mark Simmonds with Ivorian Prime Minister Daniel Kablan Duncan in London, June 2013 The UK established diplomatic relations with Ivory Coast on 12 October 1960.: Ivory Coast maintains an embassy in London.; The United Kingdom is accredited to the Ivory Coast through its embassy in Abidjan.; Both countries share common membership of the Atlantic Co-operation Pact, the International Criminal Court, the United Nations, the World Trade Organization, and the World Trade Organization. Bilaterally, the two countries have an Economic Partnership Agreement, a High Level Prosperity Partnership, and an Investment Agreement.
Kenya	1963	See Kenya–United Kingdom relations Prime Minister Keir Starmer with Kenyan President William Ruto at a United Nations General Assembly in New York City, September 2024 The UK established diplomatic relations with Kenya in 1963.: Kenya maintains a high commission in London.; The United Kingdom is accredited to Kenya through its high commission in Nairobi.; The UK governed Kenya from 1895 to 1963, when Kenya achieved full independence. Both countries share common membership of the Commonwealth, the International Criminal Court, the United Nations, the World Health Organization, and the World Trade Organization. Bilaterally the two countries have an Economic Partnership Agreement, a Defence Cooperation Agreement, a Development Partnership, a Double Taxation Agreement, and an Investment Agreement.
Lesotho	1966	See Lesotho–United Kingdom relations Foreign Office Minister Hugo Swire with Prime Minister of Lesotho Tom Thabane in London, April 2014 The UK established diplomatic relations with Lesotho on 4 October 1966.: Lesotho maintains a high commission in London.; The United Kingdom is accredited to Lesotho through its high commission in Maseru.; The UK governed Lesotho from 1868 to 1966, when it achieved full independence. Both countries share common membership of the Commonwealth, the United Nations, the World Trade Organization, and the World Trade Organization, as well as the SACUM–UK Economic Partnership Agreement. Bilaterally the two countries have an Investment Agreement.
Liberia	1849	See Liberia–United Kingdom relations Prime Minister David Cameron with Liberian President Ellen Johnson Sirleaf in London, November 2012 The UK established diplomatic relations with Liberia on 1 August 1849.: Liberia maintains an embassy in London.; The United Kingdom is accredited to Liberia through its embassy in Monrovia.; Both countries share common membership of the Atlantic Co-operation Pact, the International Criminal Court, the United Nations, and the World Trade Organization. Bilaterally, the two countries have a Development Partnership. and a Tax Information Exchange Agreement.
Libya	1951	See Libya–United Kingdom relations Prime Minister Boris Johnson with Libyan Prime Minister Abdul Hamid Dbeibeh in 10 Downing Street, June 2021 The UK established diplomatic relations with Libya on 24 December 1951.: Libya maintains an embassy in London.; The United Kingdom is accredited to Libya through its embassy in Tripoli.; The UK governed Libya from 1942 to 1951, when Libya gained full independence. Both countries share common membership of the United Nations. Bilaterally the two countries have a Double Taxation Agreement, and have signed an Investment Agreement.
Madagascar	1960	See Madagascar–United Kingdom relations Foreign Office Minister James Duddridge with Malagasy President Hery Rajaonarimampianina in London, November 2015 The UK established diplomatic relations with Madagascar on 27 June 1960.: Madagascar maintains an embassy in London.; The United Kingdom is accredited to Madagascar through its embassy in Antananarivo.; The UK governed Madagascar from 1942 to 1943, when Madagascar was transferred to France. Both countries share common membership of the International Criminal Court, the United Nations, and the World Trade Organization, as well as the Eastern and Southern Africa–UK Economic Partnership Agreement. Bilaterally the two countries have a Development Partnership.
Malawi	1964	See Malawi–United Kingdom relations The UK established diplomatic relations with Malawi on 6 July 1964.: Malawi maintains a high commission in London.; The United Kingdom is accredited to Malawi through its high commission in Lilongwe.; The UK governed Malawi from 1893 until 1964, when Malawi gained full independence. Both countries share common membership of the Commonwealth, the International Criminal Court, the United Nations, and the World Trade Organization. Bilaterally, the two countries have a Development Partnership, and a Double Taxation Agreement.
Mali	1961	See Foreign relations of Mali The UK established diplomatic relations with Mali on 22 March 1961.: Mali does not maintain an embassy in the United Kingdom.; The United Kingdom is accredited to Mali through its embassy in Bamako.; Both countries share common membership of the International Criminal Court, the United Nations, and the World Trade Organization.
Mauritania	1960	See Foreign relations of Mauritania Foreign Secretary William Hague with Mauritanian Foreign Minister Hamady Ould Hamady in Nouakchott, October 2011 The UK established diplomatic relations with Mauritania on 28 November 1960.: Mauritania maintains an embassy in London.; The United Kingdom is accredited to Mauritania through its embassy in Nouakchott.; Both countries share common membership of the Atlantic Co-operation Pact, the United Nations, and the World Trade Organization. Bilaterally, the two countries have a Development Partnership.
Mauritius	1968	See Mauritius–United Kingdom relations Prime Minister Andy Burnham and King Charles III with Mauritian Prime Minister Navin Ramgoolam at a Commonwealth summit in Antigua, November 2026 The UK established diplomatic relations with Mauritius on 12 March 1968.: Mauritius maintains a high commission in London.; The United Kingdom is accredited to Mauritius through its high commission in Port Louis.; The UK governed Mauritius from 1810 to 1968, when Mauritius achieved full independence. Both countries share common membership of the Commonwealth, the International Criminal Court, the United Nations, the World Health Organization, and the World Trade Organization, as well as the Eastern and Southern Africa–UK Economic Partnership Agreement. Bilaterally, the two countries have a Double Tax Convention.
Morocco	1956	See Morocco–United Kingdom relations Foreign Secretary David Lammy with Moroccan Prime Minister Nasser Bourita in Rabat, June 2025 The UK established diplomatic relations with Morocco on 28 June 1956.: Morocco maintains an embassy in London.; The United Kingdom is accredited to Morocco through its embassy in Rabat.; Both countries share common membership of the Atlantic Co-operation Pact, the United Nations, and the World Trade Organization. Bilaterally the two countries have an Association Agreement, and an Investment Agreement.
Mozambique	1975	See Mozambique–United Kingdom relations Prime Minister David Cameron and Foreign Secretary William Hague with Mozambican President Armando Guebuza in 10 Downing Street, May 2012 The UK established diplomatic relations with Mozambique on 27 August 1975.: Mozambique maintains a high commission in London.; The United Kingdom is accredited to Mozambique through its high commission in Maputo.; Both countries share common membership of the Commonwealth, the United Nations, and the World Trade Organization, as well as the Southern Africa Customs Union and Mozambique–UK Economic Partnership Agreement. Bilaterally the two countries have a Development Partnership, a High Level Prosperity Partnership, and an Investment Agreement.
Namibia	1990	See Namibia–United Kingdom relations The UK established diplomatic relations with Namibia in 1990.: Namibia maintains a high commission in London.; The United Kingdom is accredited to Namibia through its high commission in Windhoek.; Both countries share common membership of the Commonwealth, the International Criminal Court, the United Nations, and the World Trade Organization, as well as the SACUM–UK Economic Partnership Agreement.
Niger	1960	See Foreign relations of Niger The UK established diplomatic relations with Niger on 6 October 1960.: Niger maintains a consulate in the Milton Keynes.; The United Kingdom is accredited to Niger through its embassy in Niamey.; Both countries share common membership of the International Criminal Court, the United Nations, and the World Trade Organization. Bilaterally, the two countries have a Development Partnership.
Nigeria	1960	See Nigeria–United Kingdom relations Prime Minister Keir Starmer with Nigerian President Bola Tinubu in 10 Downing Street, March 2026 The UK established diplomatic relations with Nigeria on 1 October 1960.: Nigeria maintains a high commission in London.; The United Kingdom is accredited to Nigeria through its high commission in Abuja, and a deputy high commission in Lagos.; The UK governed Nigeria from 1862 to 1960, when Nigeria achieved full independence. Both countries share common membership of the Commonwealth, the International Criminal Court, the United Nations, and the World Trade Organization. Bilaterally the two countries have a Development Partnership, a Double Taxation Agreement, an Enhanced Trade and Investment Partnership, an Investment Agreement, and a Security and Defence Partnership.
Republic of the Congo	1960	See Foreign relations of the Republic of the Congo The UK established diplomatic relations with the Republic of the Congo on 9 December 1960.: The Republic of the Congo maintains an embassy in London.; The United Kingdom is not accredited to the Republic of the Congo through an embassy; the UK develops relations through its embassy in Kinshasa, DR Congo.; Both countries share common membership of the Atlantic co-operation pact, the International Criminal Court, the United Nations, and the World Trade Organization. Bilaterally the two countries have an Investment Agreement.
Rwanda	1962	See Rwanda–United Kingdom relations Prime Minister Rishi Sunak with Rwandan President Paul Kagame in 10 Downing Street, May 2023 The UK established diplomatic relations with Rwanda on 1 July 1962.: Rwanda maintains a high commission in London.; The United Kingdom is accredited to Rwanda through its high commission in Kigali.; Both countries share common membership of the Commonwealth, the United Nations, and the World Trade Organization. Bilaterally, the two countries have a Development Partnership.
Saint Helena, Ascension and Tristan da Cunha	N/A	See British Overseas Territories Foreign Secretary Boris Johnson with St Helena Exectutive Council member Lawson Henry in London, November 2016 The UK is responsible for Saint Helena, Ascension and Tristan da Cunha's foreign relations as a British Overseas Territory.: Saint Helena, Ascension and Tristan da Cunha maintains a representative office in London.; The United Kingdom is accredited to Saint Helena, Ascension and Tristan da Cunha through its Governer's Office in Jamestown.; The UK has governed Saint Helena, Ascension and Tristan da Cunha since 1659. Bilaterally, the two countries have a Reciprocal Healthcare Agreement.
São Tomé and Príncipe	1979	See Foreign relations of São Tomé and Príncipe The UK established diplomatic relations with São Tomé and Príncipe on 3 December 1979.: São Tomé and Príncipe does not maintain an embassy in the United Kingdom.; The United Kingdom is not accredited to São Tomé and Príncipe through an embassy; the UK develops relations through its embassy in Luanda, Angola.; Both countries share common membership of the Atlantic co-operation pact, and the United Nations.
Senegal	1960	See Senegal–United Kingdom relations Foreign Secretary William Hague with Senegalese Foreign Minister Madické Niang in London, November 2010 The UK established diplomatic relations with Senegal on 20 June 1960.: Senegal maintains an embassy in London.; The United Kingdom is accredited to Senegal through its embassy in Dakar.; Both countries share common membership of the Atlantic Co-operation Pact, the International Criminal Court, the United Nations, and the World Trade Organization. Bilaterally the two countries have a Defence Cooperation Agreement, a Double Tax Convention, an Investment Agreement, and a Technical Cooperation Agreement.
Seychelles	1976	See Seychelles–United Kingdom relations Prime Minister David Cameron with Seychellois Prime Minister James Michel in 10 Downing Street, February 2012 The UK established diplomatic relations with Seychelles on 29 June 1976.: Seychelles maintains a high commission in London.; The United Kingdom is accredited to Seychelles through its high commission in Victoria.; The UK governed Seychelles from 1811 to 1968, when Seychelles achieved full independence. Both countries share common membership of the Commonwealth, the International Criminal Court, the United Nations, the World Health Organization, and the World Trade Organization, as well as the Eastern and Southern Africa–UK Economic Partnership Agreement. Bilaterally, the two countries have an Economic Security Partnership.
Sierra Leone	1961	See Sierra Leone–United Kingdom relations The UK established diplomatic relations with Sierra Leone in April 1961.: Sierra Leone maintains a high commission in London.; The United Kingdom is accredited to Sierra Leone through its high commission in Freetown.; Both countries share common membership of the Atlantic co-operation pact, the Commonwealth, the International Criminal Court, the United Nations, and the World Trade Organization. Bilaterally the two countries have an Investment Agreement.
Somalia	1960	See Somalia–United Kingdom relations Prime Minister Boris Johnson with Somali Prime Minister Mohamed Hussein Roble in London, July 2021 The UK established diplomatic relations with Somalia on 7 July 1960.: Somalia does not maintain an embassy in London.; The United Kingdom is accredited to Somalia through its embassy in Mogadishu.; The UK governed Somaliland from 1884 to 1940 and from 1941 to 1960. Somaliland achieved full independence on 26 June 1960. The UK also governed the remaining territory of modern Somalia from 1941 to 1950, until it became an Italian Trust Territory. Both of these territories unified on 1 July 1960 to become Somalia. Both countries share common membership of the United Nations. Bilaterally, the two countries have a Development Partnership, and a Strategic Partnership.
Somaliland	N/A	See Somaliland–United Kingdom relations The UK has not established diplomatic relations with Somaliland and does not recognise Somaliland as a sovereign nation.: Somaliland maintains a diplomatic mission in London.; The United Kingdom does not have a diplomatic mission in Somaliland.; The UK governed Somaliland from 1884 to 1940 and from 1941 to 1960. Somaliland achieved full independence on 26 June 1960. The Republic of Somaliland declared independence from Somalia on 18 May 1991.
South Africa	1931	See South Africa–United Kingdom relations Prime Minister Keir Starmer with South African President Cyril Ramaphosa at a G20 summit in Johannesburg, November 2025 The UK established diplomatic relations with South Africa on 10 March 1931.: South Africa maintains a high commission in London.; The United Kingdom is accredited to South Africa through its high commission in Pretoria.; The UK governed South Africa from 1806 until 1931, when South Africa gained full independence. Both countries share common membership of the Commonwealth, the G20, the International Criminal Court, the United Nations, and the World Trade Organization, as well as the SACUM–UK Economic Partnership Agreement. Bilaterally the two countries have a Development Partnership, and a Double Taxation Convention.
South Sudan	2011	See South Sudan–United Kingdom relations Foreign Secretary William Hague with South Sudanese Vice President Riek Machar in London, January 2013 The UK established diplomatic relations with South Sudan on 9 July 2011.: South Sudan maintains an embassy in London.; The United Kingdom is accredited to South Sudan through its embassy in Juba.; The UK governed South Sudan from 1899 to 1956, when Sudan achieved full independence. Both countries share common membership of the United Nations. Bilaterally, the two countries have a Development Partnership.
Sudan	1956	See Sudan–United Kingdom relations The UK established diplomatic relations with Sudan on 3 March 1956.: Sudan maintains an embassy in London.; The United Kingdom was accredited to Sudan through its embassy in Khartoum. Due to the Battle of Khartoum, the embassy has been temporarily relocated to Addis Ababa and Nairobi.; The UK governed Sudan from 1899 to 1956, when Sudan achieved full independence. Both countries share common membership of the United Nations and the World Health Organization.
Tanzania	1964	See Tanzania–United Kingdom relations Foreign Secretary David Lammy with Tanzanian Foreign Minister Mahmoud Thabit Kombo at a Commonwealth summit in Apia, October 2024 The UK established diplomatic relations with Tanzania on 22 April 1964.: Tanzania maintains a high commission in London.; The United Kingdom is accredited to Tanzania through its high commission in Dar es Salaam.; The UK governed Tanganyika from 1916 to 1961, when Tanganyika achieved full independence; the UK governed Zanzibar from 1890 to 1963, when Zanzibar achieved full independence. Both countries unified on 26 April 1964 to become Tanzania. Both countries share common membership of the Commonwealth, the International Criminal Court, the United Nations, and the World Trade Organization. Bilaterally the two countries have a Development Partnership, and a High Level Prosperity Partnership.
Togo	1960	See Togo–United Kingdom relations The UK established diplomatic relations with Togo on 27 April 1960.: Togo maintains a high commission in London.; The United Kingdom is not accredited to Togo through a high commission; the UK develops relations through its high commission in Accra, Ghana.; The UK occupied Togo from 1914 to 1916, when Togo became a French mandate. Both countries share common membership of the Atlantic co-operation pact, the Commonwealth, the United Nations, and the World Trade Organization.
Tunisia	1956	See Tunisia–United Kingdom relations Foreign Secretary David Lammy with Tunisian Foreign Minister Mohamed Ali Nafti in Tunis, January 2025 The UK established diplomatic relations with Tunisia on 19 June 1956.: Tunisia maintains an embassy in London.; The United Kingdom is accredited to Tunisia through its embassy in Tunis.; Both countries share common membership of the International Criminal Court, the United Nations, the World Health Organization, and the World Trade Organization. Bilaterally, the two countries have an Association Agreement, a Double Taxation Convention, and an Investment Agreement.
Uganda	1962	See Uganda–United Kingdom relations Prime Minister Keir Starmer with Ugandan Vice President Jessica Alupo at a Commonwealth summit in Apia, October 2024 The UK established diplomatic relations with Uganda on 9 October 1962.: Uganda maintains a high commission in London.; The United Kingdom is accredited to Uganda through its high commission in Kampala.; The UK governed Uganda from 1894 to 1962, when Uganda achieved full independence. Both countries share common membership of the Commonwealth, the International Criminal Court, the United Nations, and the World Trade Organization. Bilaterally the two countries have a Development Partnership, and an Investment Agreement.
Zambia	1964	See United Kingdom–Zambia relations Foreign Secretary James Cleverly with Zambian President Hakainde Hichilema in Lusaka, August 2023 The UK established diplomatic relations with Zambia on 17 October 1964.: Zambia maintains a high commission in London.; The United Kingdom is accredited to Zambia through its high commission in Lusaka.; The UK governed Zambia from 1911 to 1964, when Zambia achieved full independence. Both countries share common membership of the Commonwealth, the International Criminal Court, the United Nations, and the World Trade Organization. Bilaterally the two countries have a Development Partnership, a Double Taxation Agreement, an Energy Africa Partnership Agreement, a Green Growth Compact, and have signed an Investment Agreement.
Zimbabwe	1980	See United Kingdom–Zimbabwe relations Foreign Secretary Boris Johnson with Zimbabwean Foreign Minister Sibusiso Moyo at a Commonwealth summit in London, April 2018 The UK established diplomatic relations with Zimbabwe on 18 April 1980.: Zimbabwe maintains an embassy in London.; The United Kingdom is accredited to Zimbabwe through its embassy in Harare.; The UK governed Zimbabwe from 1923 to 1980, when Zimbabwe achieved full independence. Both countries share common membership of the United Nations, and the World Trade Organization, as well as the Eastern and Southern Africa–UK Economic Partnership Agreement. Bilaterally the two countries have a Development Partnership, a Double Taxation Convention, and have signed an Investment Agreement.

=== Asia ===
Country	Since	Notes
Afghanistan	1921	See Afghanistan–United Kingdom relations Prime Minister David Cameron with Afghan President Hamid Karzai in Kabul, June 2010 The UK established diplomatic relations with Afghanistan on 22 November 1921. The UK currently recognises the Islamic Republic of Afghanistan government, over the de facto Islamic Emirate of Afghanistan government, as the legal administrator of the country.: Afghanistan maintains an embassy in London.; The United Kingdom was accredited to Afghanistan through its embassy in Kabul. Following the fall of Kabul, the embassy has been co-located with the British Embassy in Doha, Qatar.; The UK governed Afghanistan from 1879–1919, when Afghanistan achieved full independence. Both countries share common membership of the International Criminal Court, the United Nations, the World Health Organization, and the World Trade Organization. Bilaterally, the two countries have a Development Partnership.
Armenia	1992	See Armenia–United Kingdom relations Prime Minister Keir Starmer with Armenian Prime Minister Nikol Pashinyan at a European Political Community summit in Yerevan, May 2026 The UK established diplomatic relations with Armenia on 20 January 1992.: Armenia maintains an embassy in London.; The United Kingdom is accredited to Armenia through its embassy in Yerevan.; Both countries share common membership of the Council of Europe, the European Court of Human Rights, the International Criminal Court, the OSCE, the United Nations, the World Health Organization, and the World Trade Organization. Bilaterally the two countries have a Double Taxation Convention, an Investment Agreement, and a Strategic Partnership.
Azerbaijan	1992	See Azerbaijan–United Kingdom relations Prime Minister Theresa May with Azerbaijani President Ilham Aliyev in Downing Street, April 2018 The UK established diplomatic relations with Azerbaijan on 11 March 1992.: Azerbaijan maintains an embassy in London.; The United Kingdom is accredited to Azerbaijan through its embassy in Baku.; Both countries are members of the Council of Europe, the European Court of Human Rights, the OSCE, the United Nations, and the World Health Organization. Bilaterally the two countries have a Double Taxation Agreement, and an Investment Agreement.
Bahrain	1971	See Bahrain–United Kingdom relations Prime Minister Keir Starmer with Bahraini Crown Prince Salman bin Hamad Al Khalifa at Al-Sakhir Palace in Zallaq, April 2026 The UK established diplomatic relations with Bahrain on 21 August 1971.: Bahrain maintains an embassy in London.; The United Kingdom is accredited to Bahrain through its embassy in Manama.; The UK governed Bahrain from 1861 to 1971, when it achieved full independence. Both countries share common membership of the United Nations, the World Health Organization, and the World Trade Organization, as well as the Bahrain–US Comprehensive Security Integration and Prosperity Agreement. Bilaterally the two countries have a Double Taxation Agreement. Both countries are negotiating a Free Trade Agreement.
Bangladesh	1972	See Bangladesh–United Kingdom relations Prime Minister David Cameron with Bangladeshi Prime Minister Sheikh Hasina in Downing Street, January 2011 The UK established diplomatic relations with Bangladesh on 4 February 1972.: Bangladesh maintains a high commission in London.; The United Kingdom is accredited to Bangladesh through its high commission in Dhaka.; The UK governed Bangladesh from 1699 to 1947, when it achieved independence as part of Pakistan. Both countries share common membership of the Commonwealth, the International Criminal Court, the United Nations, the World Health Organization, and the World Trade Organization. Bilaterally the two countries have a Development Partnership, a Double Taxation Convention, an Investment Agreement, and an Illegal Migration Returns Agreement.
Bhutan	N/A	See Bhutan–United Kingdom relations Foreign Office Minister Hugo Swire with Bhutanese Chief Justice Sonam Tobgye in London, February 2013 The UK has not established diplomatic relations with Bhutan; however, it does recognise Bhutan as a sovereign nation.: The UK is accredited to Bhutan through its deputy high commission in Kolkata, India.; Relations between Bhutan and the UK date back to the 18th Century Both countries are members of the United Nations and the World Health Organization.
Brunei	1984	See Brunei–United Kingdom relations Prime Minister Keir Starmer with Bruneian Sultanate Hassanal Bolkiah in Downing Street, December 2024 The UK established diplomatic relations with Brunei on 1 January 1984.: Brunei maintains a high commission in London.; The United Kingdom is accredited to Brunei through its high commission in Bandar Seri Begawan.; The UK governed the Brunei from 1888 to 1984, when Brunei achieved full independence. Both countries are members of the Commonwealth, CPTPP, the United Nations, the World Health Organization, and the World Trade Organization. Bilaterally, the two countries have a Double Taxation Agreement.
British Indian Ocean Territory	N/A	See British Overseas Territories The UK is responsible for the foreign relations of the British Indian Ocean Territory as a British Overseas Territory.: The British Indian Ocean Territory is administered from its Commissioner's Office in London.; The UK has governed the British Indian Ocean Territory since 1814.
Cambodia	1952	See Cambodia–United Kingdom relations Foreign Secretary David Lammy with Cambodian Social Minister Chea Somethy in London, March 2025 The UK established diplomatic relations with Cambodia on 5 May 1952.: Cambodia maintains an embassy in London.; The United Kingdom is accredited to Cambodia through its embassy in Phnom Penh.; Both countries share common membership of the International Criminal Court, the United Nations, the World Health Organization, and the World Trade Organization. Bilaterally, the two countries have a Development Partnership.
China	1954	See China–United Kingdom relations Prime Minister Keir Starmer with General Secretary of the Chinese Communist Party Xi Jinping in Beijing, January 2026 The UK established diplomatic relations with the People's Republic of China on 17 June 1954.: China maintains an embassy in London.; The United Kingdom is accredited to China through its embassy in Beijing, and consulate generals in Guangzhou, Hong Kong, and Shanghai.; The UK governed the territories of Hong Kong, from 1841 to 1941 and 1945 to 1997, as well as Weihaiwei from 1898 to 1930. Both countries share common membership of the G20, the UNSC P5, the United Nations, the World Health Organization, and the World Trade Organization. Bilaterally the two countries have a Double Taxation Agreement, an Investment Agreement, and the Sino-British Joint Declaration.
Georgia	1992	See Georgia–United Kingdom relations Minister for Europe David Lidington with Georgian Prime Minister Giorgi Kvirikashvili in London, November 2015 The UK established diplomatic relations with Georgia on 27 April 1992.: Georgia maintains an embassy in London.; The United Kingdom is accredited to Georgia through its embassy in Tbilisi.; Both countries share common membership of the Council of Europe, European Court of Human Rights, the International Criminal Court, OSCE, the United Nations, the World Health Organization, and the World Trade Organization. Bilaterally the two countries have and an Investment Agreement, and a Strategic Partnership and Cooperation Agreement.
Hong Kong	N/A	See Hong Kong–United Kingdom relations Prime Minister David Cameron with Hong Kong Chief Executive Donald Tsang in Downing Street, September 2011 The UK established modern diplomatic relations with Hong Kong on 1 July 1997.: Hong Kong is represented through its Economic and Trade Office in London.; The United Kingdom is accredited to Hong Kong from its consulate general on Hong Kong Island.; The UK governed Hong Kong from 1841 to 1941 and from 1945 to 1997, when Hong Kong's sovereignty was ceded to the People's Republic of China. Both share common membership of the World Trade Organization. Bilaterally the two have an Investment Agreement.
India	1947	See India–United Kingdom relations Prime Minister Keir Starmer with Indian Prime Minister Narendra Modi in Mumbai, October 2025 The UK established diplomatic relations with India on 14 August 1947.: India maintains a high commission in London.; The United Kingdom is accredited to India through its high commission in New Delhi, as well as Deputy High Commissions in Ahmedabad, Bangalore, Chandigarh, Chennai, Hyderabad, Kolkata, Mumbai, and a Nationals Assistance Office in Goa.; The UK governed the India from 1858 to 1947, when it achieved full independence. Both countries share common membership of the Commonwealth, the G20, the United Nations, the World Health Organization, and the World Trade Organization. Bilaterally the two countries have a Comprehensive Economic and Trade Agreement, a Comprehensive Strategic Partnership, and a Development Partnership.
Indonesia	1949	See Indonesia–United Kingdom relations Prime Minister Keir Starmer with Indonesian President Prabowo Subianto in 10 Downing Street, January 2026 The UK established diplomatic relations with Indonesia on 27 December 1949.: Indonesia maintains an embassy in London.; The United Kingdom is accredited to Indonesia through its embassy in Jakarta, as well as an honorary consulate in Bali.; Both countries share common membership of the G20, the United Nations, the World Health Organization, and the World Trade Organization. Bilaterally the two countries have a Development Partnership, a Double Taxation Agreement, an Investment Agreement, and a Strategic Partnership.
Iran	1807	See Iran–United Kingdom relations Prime Minister Theresa May with Irani President Hassan Rouhani at a United Nations General Assembly in New York City, September 2016 The UK established diplomatic relations with Iran on 5 June 1807.: Iran maintains an embassy in London.; The United Kingdom is accredited to Iran through its embassy in Tehran.; Both countries are members of the United Nations and the World Health Organization. Bilaterally, the two countries have an Air Transport Agreement.
Iraq	1932	See Iraq–United Kingdom relations Prime Minister Keir Starmer with Iraqi President Mohammed Shia Al Sudani in 10 Downing Street, January 2025 The UK established diplomatic relations with Iraq on 4 October 1932.: Iraq maintains an embassy in London.; The United Kingdom is accredited to Iraq through its embassy in Baghdad.; The UK governed Iraq from 1921 until 1932, when it achieved full independence. Both countries share common membership of the United Nations, the World Health Organization, and the World Trade Organization. Bilaterally the two countries have a Development Partnership, a Partnership and Cooperation Agreement, and a Strategic Partnership.
Israel	1948	See Israel–United Kingdom relations Prime Minister Keir Starmer with Israeli President Isaac Herzog in 10 Downing Street, September 2025 The UK established diplomatic relations with Israel in 1950.: Israel maintains an embassy in London.; The United Kingdom is accredited to Israel through its embassy in Tel Aviv.; The UK governed Israel from 1921 until 1948, when it achieved full independence. Both countries share common membership of the OECD, the United Nations, the World Health Organization, and the World Trade Organization. Bilaterally the two countries have a Trade and Partnership Agreement, a Reciprocal Healthcare Agreement, and a Strategic Partnership. The two countries are currently negotiating a new Free Trade Agreement.
Japan	1858	See Japan–United Kingdom relations Prime Minister Keir Starmer with Japanese Prime Minister Sanae Takaichi in Tokyo, January 2026 The UK established diplomatic relations with Japan on 26 August 1858.: Japan maintains an embassy in London.; The United Kingdom is accredited to Japan through its embassy in Tokyo.; Both countries share common membership of the Coalition of the Willing, CPTPP, the G7, the G20, the International Criminal Court, OECD, the United Nations, the World Health Organization, and the World Trade Organization. Bilaterally the two countries have a Comprehensive Economic Partnership Agreement, a Double Taxation Convention, and a Reciprocal Access Agreement.
Jordan	1946	See Jordan–United Kingdom relations Prime Minister Keir Starmer with Jordanian King Abdullah II in 10 Downing Street, February 2026 The UK established diplomatic relations with Jordan on 17 June 1946.: Jordan maintains an embassy in London.; The United Kingdom is accredited to Jordan through its embassy in Amman.; The UK governed Jordan from 1921 until 1946, when it achieved full independence. Both countries share common membership of the International Criminal Court, the United Nations, the World Health Organization, and the World Trade Organization. Bilaterally, the two countries have an Association Agreement, a Development Partnership, a Double Taxation Convention, and a Strategic Partnership.
Kazakhstan	1992	See Kazakhstan–United Kingdom relations Prime Minister Keir Starmer with Kazakh President Kassym-Jomart Tokayev at COP29 in Baku, November 2024 The UK established diplomatic relations with Kazakhstan on 19 January 1992.: Kazakhstan maintains an embassy in London.; The UK is accredited to Kazakhstan through its embassy in Astana.; Both countries share common membership of the OSCE, the United Nations, the World Health Organization, the World Health Organization, and the World Trade Organization. Bilaterally the two countries have a Development Partnership, a Double Taxation Convention, an Investment Agreement, and a Strategic Partnership and Cooperation Agreement.
Kuwait	1961	See Kuwait–United Kingdom relations Prime Minister Keir Starmer with Crown Prince of Kuwait Sabah Al-Khalid Al-Sabah at a United Nations General Assembly in New York City, September 2024 The UK established diplomatic relations with Kuwait on 8 November 1961.: Kuwait maintains an embassy in London.; The United Kingdom is accredited to Kuwait through its embassy in Kuwait City.; The UK governed Kuwait from 1899 to 1961, when it achieved full independence. Both countries share common membership of the United Nations, the World Health Organization, and the World Trade Organization. Bilaterally the two countries have signed an Investment Agreement. The UK and the Gulf Cooperation Council, of which Kuwait is a member, are negotiating a Free Trade Agreement.
Kyrgyzstan	1992	See Kyrgyzstan–United Kingdom relations Foreign Secretary David Cameron with Foreign Minister Jeenbek Kulubayev in Bishkek, April 2024 The UK established diplomatic relations with Kyrgyzstan on 12 June 1992.: Kyrgyzstan maintains an embassy in London.; The UK is accredited to Kyrgyzstan through its embassy in Bishkek.; Both countries share common membership of the OSCE, the United Nations, the World Health Organization, and the World Trade Organization. Bilaterally the two countries have a Development Partnership, a Double Taxation Agreement, and an Investment Agreement.
Laos	1955	See Laos–United Kingdom relations Foreign Secretary David Lammy with Lao Foreign Minister Saleumxay Kommasith in Vientiane, July 2025 The UK established diplomatic relations with Laos on 5 September 1955.: Laos maintains an embassy in London.; The UK is accredited to Laos through its embassy in Vientiane.; Both countries share common membership of the United Nations, the World Health Organization, and the World Trade Organization. Bilaterally, the two countries have an Investment Agreement.
Lebanon	1942	See Lebanon–United Kingdom relations Prime Minister Keir Starmer with Lebanese Prime Minister Najib Mikati in 10 Downing Street, October 2024 The UK established diplomatic relations with Lebanon on 9 February 1942.: Lebanon maintains an embassy in London.; The UK is accredited to Lebanon through its embassy in Beirut.; Both countries share common membership of the United Nations, the World Health Organization, and the World Trade Organization. Bilaterally, the two countries have an Association Agreement, and a Development Partnership.
Macao	N/A	See Foreign relations of Macao The UK established modern diplomatic relations with Macao on 20 December 1999.: Macao does not maintain a diplomatic mission in the United Kingdom.; The United Kingdom is not accredited to Macao through a diplomatic mission; the UK develops relations through its Consulate General in Hong Kong.; Both share common membership of the World Trade Organization.
Malaysia	1957	See Malaysia–United Kingdom relations Prime Minister Keir Starmer with Malaysian Prime Minister Anwar Ibrahim in 10 Downing Street, January 2025 The UK established diplomatic relations with Malaysia on 31 August 1957.: Malaysia maintains a high commission in London.; The United Kingdom is accredited to the Malaysia through its high commission in Kuala Lumpur.; The UK governed the Malaysia from 1826 to 1942 and 1945 to 1957, when it achieved full independence. Both countries share common membership of the Commonwealth, CPTPP, the Five Power Defence Arrangements, the United Nations, the World Health Organization, and the World Trade Organization. Bilaterally the two countries have a Double Taxation Agreement, and an Investment Agreement.
Maldives	1965	See Maldives–United Kingdom relations Prime Minister Keir Starmer with Maldivian President Mohamed Muizzu at COP29 in Baku, November 2024 The UK established diplomatic relations with the Maldives on 26 July 1965.: The Maldives maintains a high commission in London.; The United Kingdom is accredited to the Maldives through its high commission in Malé.; The UK governed the Maldives from 1796 to 1965, when the Maldives achieved full independence. Both countries share common membership of the Commonwealth, the International Criminal Court, the United Nations, the World Health Organization, and the World Trade Organization. Both countries are currently negotiating a Free Trade Agreement.
Mongolia	1963	See Mongolia–United Kingdom relations Foreign Secretary David Cameron with Mongolian Foreign Minister Battsetseg Batmunkh in Ulaanbaatar, April 2024 The UK established diplomatic relations with Mongolia on 23 January 1963.: Mongolia maintains an embassy in London.; The United Kingdom is accredited to Mongolia through its embassy in Ulaanbaatar.; Both countries share common membership of the International Criminal Court, the United Nations, the World Health Organization, and the World Trade Organization. Bilaterally the two countries have an Air Services Agreement, a Development Partnership, a Double Taxation Agreement, and an Investment Agreement.
Myanmar	1947	See Myanmar–United Kingdom relations Prime Minister Theresa May with Myanmar State Counsellor Aung San Suu Kyi in 10 Downing Street, September 2016 The UK established diplomatic relations with Myanmar on 7 July 1947.: Myanmar maintains an embassy in London.; The United Kingdom is accredited to Myanmar through its embassy in Yangon.; The UK governed Myanmar from 1824 to 1942 and 1945 to 1948, when Myanmar achieved full independence. Both countries share common membership of the United Nations, the World Health Organization, and the World Trade Organization. Bilaterally, the two countries have a Development Partnership, and a Double Taxation Agreement.
Nepal	1816	See Nepal–United Kingdom relations Prime Minister Theresa May with Nepali Prime Minister K. P. Sharma Oli at a United Nations General Assembly in New York City, September 2018 The UK established diplomatic relations with Nepal on 4 March 1816.: Nepal maintains an embassy in London.; The United Kingdom is accredited to Nepal through its embassy in Kathmandu.; Both countries share common membership of the United Nations, the World Health Organization, and the World Trade Organization. Bilaterally the two countries have a Development Partnership, and an Investment Agreement.
North Korea	2000	See North Korea–United Kingdom relations The UK established diplomatic relations with North Korea on 12 December 2000.: North Korea maintains an embassy in London.; The United Kingdom is accredited to North Korea through its embassy in Pyongyang.; Both countries share common membership of the United Nations.
Oman	1971	See Oman–United Kingdom relations Prime Minister Andy Burnham with Omani Sultanate Haitham bin Tariq in 10 Downing Street, October 2026 The UK established diplomatic relations with Oman on 21 May 1971.: Oman maintains an embassy in London.; The United Kingdom is accredited to Oman through its embassy in Muscat.; The UK governed Oman from 1891 until 1951, when Oman achieved full independence. Both countries share common membership of the United Nations, the World Health Organization, and the World Trade Organization. Bilaterally the two countries have a Comprehensive Agreement on Enduring Friendship and Bilateral Cooperation, a Double Taxation Agreement, an Investment Agreement, and a Mutual Defence Agreement. Pluriterally the UK has a Free Trade Agreement with the Gulf Cooperation Council.
Pakistan	1947	See Pakistan–United Kingdom relations Prime Minister Keir Starmer with Pakistani Prime Minister Shehbaz Sharif at a United Nations General Assembly in New York City, September 2024 The UK established diplomatic relations with Pakistan on 14 August 1947.: Pakistan maintains a high commission in London.; The United Kingdom is accredited to Pakistan through its high commission in Islamabad, as well as a deputy high commission in Karachi.; The UK governed Pakistan from 1824 to 1947, when Pakistan achieved full independence. Both countries share common membership of the Commonwealth, the United Nations, and the World Trade Organization. Bilaterally the two countries have a Development Partnership, a Double Taxation Convention, and an Investment Agreement.
Palestine	2026	See Palestine–United Kingdom relations Prime Minister Keir Starmer with Palestinian President Mahmoud Abbas in 10 Downing Street, October 2025 The UK established diplomatic relations with Palestine on 5 January 2026.: Palestine maintains a embassy in London.; The United Kingdom is not accredited to Palestine through an embassy; the UK develops relations through its Consulate General in Jerusalem, Israel.; The UK governed Palestine from 1921 until 1948, when it achieved full independence. Both countries are members of the International Criminal Court and the United Nations. Bilaterally, the two countries have a Development Partnership, and a Political, Trade and Partnership Agreement.
Philippines	1946	See Philippines–United Kingdom relations Foreign Secretary David Lammy with Filipino Foreign Affairs Secretary Tess Lazaro in Kuala Lumpur, July 2025 The UK established diplomatic relations with the Philippines on 4 July 1946.: The Philippines maintains an embassy in London.; The United Kingdom is accredited to the Philippines through its embassy in Manila.; Both countries share common membership of the United Nations, the World Health Organization, and the World Trade Organization. Bilaterally the two countries have an Investment Agreement.
Qatar	1972	See Qatar–United Kingdom relations Prime Minister Keir Starmer with Qatari Emir Tamim bin Hamad Al Thani in Doha, April 2026 The UK established diplomatic relations with Qatar on 24 May 1972.: Qatar maintains an embassy in London.; The United Kingdom is accredited to Qatar through its embassy in Doha.; The UK governed Qatar from 1916 to 1971, when it achieved full independence. Both countries share common membership of the United Nations, the World Health Organization, and the World Trade Organization. Bilaterally the two countries have a Climate Technology Partnership, a Security Pact, a Strategic Investment Partnership, and have signed an Investment Agreement. The two countries are negotiating a Free Trade Agreement.
Saudi Arabia	1927	See Saudi Arabia–United Kingdom relations Prime Minister Keir Starmer with Saudi Crown Prince Mohammed bin Salman in Jeddah, April 2026 The UK established diplomatic relations with Saudi Arabia on 20 May 1927.: Saudi Arabia maintains an embassy in London.; The United Kingdom is accredited to Saudi Arabia through its embassy in Riyadh, as well as a consulate general in Jeddah.; Both countries share common membership of the United Nations, the World Health Organization, and the World Trade Organization. Bilaterally the two countries have a Critical Minerals Partnership, a Defence Agreement, a Double Taxation Agreement, and a Strategic Partnership. Both countries are negotiating a Free Trade Agreement.
Singapore	1965	See Singapore–United Kingdom relations Prime Minister Keir Starmer with Singaporean Prime Minister Lawrence Wong at a Commonwealth summit in Apia, October 2024 The UK established diplomatic relations with Singapore on 9 August 1965.: Singapore maintains a high commission in London.; The United Kingdom is accredited to Singapore through its high commission in Singapore.; The UK governed the Singapore from 1819 to 1942 and 1946 to 1963, when Singapore achieved independence within Malaysia. Both countries share common membership of the Commonwealth, CPTPP, the Five Power Defence Arrangements, the United Nations, the World Health Organization, and the World Trade Organization. Bilaterally the two countries have a Digital Economy Agreement, a Double Taxation Agreement, a Free Trade Agreement, and an Investment Agreement.
South Korea	1949	See South Korea–United Kingdom relations South Korean President Lee Jae-myung with British Prime Minister Keir Starmer at a G7 summit in Kananaskis, June 2025 The UK established diplomatic relations with South Korea on 18 January 1949.: South Korea maintains an embassy in London.; The United Kingdom is accredited to South Korea through its embassy in Seoul.; Both countries share common membership of the G20, the International Criminal Court, the OECD, the United Nations, the World Health Organization, and the World Trade Organization. Bilaterally, the two countries have a Double Taxation Convention, the Downing Street Accord, and a Trade Agreement. The two countries are negotiating a new Free Trade Agreement.
Sri Lanka	1946	See Sri Lanka–United Kingdom relations Foreign Secretary Yvette Cooper with Sri Lankan Prime Minister Harini Nireka Amarasuriya in 10 Downing Street, May 2026 The UK established diplomatic relations with Sri Lanka on 22 October 1946.: Sri Lanka maintains a high commission in London.; The United Kingdom is accredited to Sri Lanka through its high commission in Colombo.; The UK governed Sri Lanka from 1802 to 1948, until it achieved full independence as Ceylon. Both countries share common membership of the Commonwealth, the United Nations, the World Health Organization, and the World Trade Organization. Bilaterally the two countries have an Investment Agreement.
Syria	1942	See Syria–United Kingdom relations Prime Minister Starmer with Syrian President Ahmed al-Sharaa in 10 Downing Street, March 2026 The UK re-established diplomatic relations with Syria on 5 July 2025.: Syria's embassy in London remains closed despite the re-establishment of diplomatic relations.; The UK 's embassy in Damascus is currently closed with all consular operations suspended.; Both countries share common membership of the United Nations, the World Health Organization, and the World Trade Organization. Bilaterally, the two countries have a Development Partnership.
Taiwan	N/A	See Taiwan–United Kingdom relations The UK has not established formal diplomatic relations with Taiwan; it does not recognise Taiwan as a sovereign nation.: Taiwan maintains the Taipei Representative Office in London, in addition to a branch office in Edinburgh.; The United Kingdom is accredited to Taiwan through its office in Taipei.; In 1950, the UK switched its recognition from the Republic of China (ROC) to the People's Republic of China (PRC). Both countries share common membership of the World Trade Organization.
Tajikistan	1992	See Tajikistan–United Kingdom relations Foreign Secretary David Cameron with Tajikistani Foreign Minister Sirojiddin Muhriddin in Dushanbe, April 2024 The UK established diplomatic relations with Tajikistan on 15 January 1992.: Tajikistan maintains an embassy in London.; The UK is accredited to Tajikistan embassy in Dushanbe.; Both countries share common membership of the International Criminal Court, the OSCE, the United Nations, the World Health Organization, and the World Trade Organization. Bilaterally, the two countries have a Development Partnership, and a Double Taxation Agreement.
Thailand	1855	See Thailand–United Kingdom relations Prime Minister Theresa May with Thai Prime Minister Prayut Chan-o-cha in 10 Downing Street, June 2018 The UK established diplomatic relations with Thailand on 18 April 1855.: Thailand maintains an embassy in London.; The UK is accredited to Thailand through its embassy in Bangkok.; Both countries share common membership of the United Nations, the World Health Organization, and the World Trade Organization.
Timor-Leste	2002	See Timor-Leste–United Kingdom relations Foreign Secretary David Lammy with President of Timor-Leste José Ramos-Horta in London, April 2025 The UK established diplomatic relations with Timor-Leste in 2002.: Timor-Leste maintains an embassy in London.; The United Kingdom is accredited to Timor-Leste from its embassy in Jakarta; there is no British embassy in Timor-Leste. On 29 February 2024, the UK announced its intentions to reopen an embassy in Dili.; Both countries share common membership of the International Criminal Court, the United Nations, the World Health Organization, and the World Trade Organization.
Turkey	1924	See Turkey–United Kingdom relations Prime Minister Keir Starmer with Turkish President Recep Tayyip Erdoğan in Ankara, October 2025 The UK established diplomatic relations with Turkey on 2 September 1924.: Turkey maintains an embassy in London, and consulates generals in Edinburgh, London and Manchester.; The United Kingdom is accredited to Turkey through its embassy in Ankara, a consulate general in Istanbul, and an honorary vice consulate in Antalya. The United Kingdom also has a consulate in İzmir, and honorary consulates in Bodrum, Fethiye, and Marmaris.; Both countries share common membership of the Coalition of the Willing, the Council of Europe, the G20, NATO, the OECD, the OSCE, the United Nations, the World Health Organization, and the World Trade Organization. Bilaterally the two countries have a Double Taxation Agreement, an Investment Agreement, and a Trade Agreement. Both countries are negotiating a new Free Trade Agreement.
Turkmenistan	1992	See Turkmenistan–United Kingdom relations Turkmenistani Finance Minister Batyr Bazarov at a Trade & Industry Council meeting in London, January 2018 The UK established diplomatic relations with Turkmenistan on 23 January 1992.: Turkmenistan maintains an embassy in London.; The UK is accredited to Turkmenistan through its embassy in Ashgabat.; Both countries share common membership of the OSCE, the United Nations, and the World Health Organization. Bilaterally the two countries have a Development Partnership, a Double Taxation Convention, and an Investment Agreement.
United Arab Emirates	1971	See United Arab Emirates–United Kingdom relations Prime Minister Keir Starmer in Abu Dhabi, December 2024 The UK established diplomatic relations with the United Arab Emirates on 6 December 1971.: The United Arab Emirates maintains an embassy in London.; The United Kingdom is accredited to the United Arab Emirates through its embassies in Abu Dhabi and Dubai.; The UK governed the United Arab Emirates from 1920 to 1971, when the United Arab Emirates achieved full independence. Both countries share common membership of the United Nations, the World Health Organization, and the World Trade Organization. Bilaterally the two countries have a Defence Cooperation Accord, an Investment Agreement, and a Partnership for the Future. Both countries are negotiating a Free Trade Agreement.
Uzbekistan	1992	See United Kingdom–Uzbekistan relations Foreign Secretary David Lammy with Uzbek Foreign Minister Bakhtiyor Saidov at COP29 in Baku, November 2024 The UK established diplomatic relations with Uzbekistan on 18 February 1992.: Uzbekistan maintains an embassy in London.; The United Kingdom is accredited to Uzbekistan through its embassy in Tashkent.; Both countries are members of the OSCE and the United Nations. Bilaterally the two countries have a Development Partnership, a Double Taxation Agreement, and a Partnership and Cooperation Agreement.
Vietnam	1973	See United Kingdom–Vietnam relations Prime Minister Keir Starmer with General Secretary of the Communist Party of Vietnam Tô Lâm in 10 Downing Street, October 2025 The UK established diplomatic relations with Vietnam on 11 September 1973.: Vietnam maintains an embassy in London.; The UK is accredited to Vietnam through its embassy in Hanoi, and a Consulate General in Ho Chi Minh City.; Both countries are members of CPTPP, the United Nations, the World Health Organization, and the World Trade Organization. Bilaterally the two countries have a Comprehensive Strategic Partnership, a Double Taxation Agreement, a Free Trade Agreement, and an Investment Agreement.
Yemen	1951	See United Kingdom–Yemen relations Foreign Secretary David Cameron with Yemeni Prime Minister Ahmad Awad bin Mubarak in London, May 2024 The UK established diplomatic relations with Yemen on 24 October 1951.: Yemen maintains an embassy in London.; The United Kingdom is accredited to Yemen through its embassy in Sanaa.; The UK governed the Yemen from 1837 to 1967, when it achieved full independence as South Yemen. Both countries share common membership of the United Nations, the World Health Organization, and the World Trade Organization. Bilaterally the two countries have a Development Partnership, and an Investment Agreement.

=== Europe ===
Country	Since	Notes
Albania	1921	See Albania–United Kingdom relations Prime Minister Keir Starmer with Albanian President Bajram Begaj in Tirana, May 2025 The UK established diplomatic relations with Albania on 9 November 1921.: Albania maintains an embassy in London.; The United Kingdom is accredited to Albania through its embassy in Tirana.; Both countries share common membership of the Coalition of the Willing, the Council of Europe, European Court of Human Rights, the International Criminal Court, NATO, OSCE, the United Nations, and the World Trade Organization. Bilaterally, the two countries have a Double Taxation Agreement, an Investment Agreement, a Partnership, Trade and Cooperation Agreement, a Readmission Agreement, and an Agreement on the Transfer of Sentenced Persons.
Andorra	1994	See Andorra–United Kingdom relations The UK established diplomatic relations with Andorra on 9 March 1994.: Andorra does not maintain an embassy in the United Kingdom.; The United Kingdom is not accredited to Andorra through an embassy; the UK develops relations through its Consulate General in Barcelona, Spain.; Both countries share common membership of the Council of Europe, European Court of Human Rights, the International Criminal Court, OSCE, the United Nations, and the World Health Organization. Bilaterally, the two countries have a Double Taxation Convention.
Austria	1799	See Austria–United Kingdom relations Prime Minister Keir Starmer with Austrian Prime Minister Christian Stocker at a Western Balkans Summit in Lancaster House, October 2025 The UK established diplomatic relations with Austria on 8 November 1919.: Austria maintains an embassy in London.; The United Kingdom is accredited to Austria through its embassy in Vienna.; Both countries share common membership of the Coalition of the Willing, the Council of Europe, the European Court of Human Rights, the International Criminal Court, the OSCE, the United Nations, and the World Trade Organization. Bilaterally, the two countries have a Double Taxation Convention.
Belarus	1992	See Belarus–United Kingdom relations The UK established diplomatic relations with Belarus on 27 January 1992.: Belarus maintains an embassy in London.; The United Kingdom is accredited to Belarus through its embassy in Minsk.; Both countries are members of the OSCE and the United Nations. Bilaterally, the two countries have a Double Taxation Agreement, and an Investment Agreement.
Belgium	1830	See Belgium–United Kingdom relations Prime Minister Keir Starmer with Belgian Prime Minister Bart De Wever in 10 Downing Street, December 2025 The UK established diplomatic relations with Belgium on 1 December 1830.: Belgium maintains an embassy in London.; The United Kingdom is accredited to Belgium through its embassy in Brussels.; Both countries share common membership of the Atlantic Co-operation Pact, the Coalition of the Willing, the Council of Europe, the European Court of Human Rights, the International Criminal Court, NATO, the OECD, the OSCE, the United Nations, and the World Trade Organization. Bilaterally, the two countries have a Classified Information Protection Agreement, a Double Taxation Convention, and a Maritime Cooperation Agreement.
Bosnia and Herzegovina	1992	See Bosnia and Herzegovina–United Kingdom relations Foreign Secretary David Lammy with Bosnian Foreign Minister Elmedin Konaković in Sarajevo, May 2025 The UK established diplomatic relations with Bosnia and Herzegovina on 13 April 1992.: Bosnia and Herzegovina maintains an embassy in London.; The United Kingdom is accredited to Bosnia and Herzegovina through its embassy in Sarajevo.; Both countries share common membership of the Council of Europe, the European Court of Human Rights, the International Criminal Court, the United Nations, and the OSCE. Bilaterally the two countries have a Double Taxation Convention, an Investment Agreement, and a Reciprocal Healthcare Agreement.
Bulgaria	1879	See Bulgaria–United Kingdom relations Prime Minister Keir Starmer with Bulgarian Prime Minister Rosen Zhelyazkov at a Western Balkans Summit in Lancaster House, October 2025 The UK established diplomatic relations with Bulgaria on 23 July 1879.: Bulgaria maintains an embassy in London.; The United Kingdom is accredited to Bulgaria through its embassy in Sofia.; Both countries share common membership of the Coalition of the Willing, the Council of Europe, European Court of Human Rights, the International Criminal Court, NATO, OSCE, the United Nations, and the World Trade Organization. Bilaterally the two countries have an Investment Agreement, and a Strategic Partnership.
Croatia	1992	See Croatia–United Kingdom relations Prime Minister Boris Johnson with Croatian President Andrej Plenković in Downing Street, February 2020 The UK established diplomatic relations with Croatia on 24 June 1992.: Croatia maintains an embassy in London.; The United Kingdom is accredited to Croatia through its embassy in Zagreb.; Both countries share common membership of the Coalition of the Willing, the Council of Europe, the European Court of Human Rights, the International Criminal Court, NATO, the OSCE, the United Nations, and the World Trade Organization. Bilaterally, the two countries have a Double Taxation Agreement, and an Investment Agreement.
Cyprus	1960	See Cyprus–United Kingdom relations Prime Minister Keir Starmer with Cypriot President Nikos Christodoulides in Downing Street, October 2024 The UK established diplomatic relations with Cyprus on 1 October 1960. The UK is a "guarantor power" of Cyprus's independence.: Cyprus maintains a high commission in London, and honorary consulates in Belfast, Birmingham, Bristol, Dunblane, Glasgow, and Leeds.; The United Kingdom is accredited to Cyprus through its high commission in Nicosia.; The UK governed Cyprus from 1878 until 1960, when it achieved full independence. Both countries share common membership of the Coalition of the Willing, the Commonwealth, the Council of Europe, European Court of Human Rights, the International Criminal Court, the OSCE, the United Nations, the World Health Organization, and the World Trade Organization. Bilaterally the two countries have a Double Taxation Agreement.
Czech Republic	1918	See Czech Republic–United Kingdom relations Prime Minister Keir Starmer with Czech Prime Minister Petr Fiala at a European Political Community summit in 10 Downing Street, July 2025 The UK established diplomatic relations with the Czech Republic on 26 October 1918.: The Czech Republic maintains an embassy in London.; The United Kingdom is accredited to the Czech Republic through its embassy in Prague.; Both countries share common membership of the Coalition of the Willing, the Council of Europe, the European Court of Human Rights, the International Criminal Court, NATO, the OSCE, the United Nations, and the World Trade Organization. Bilaterally, the two countries have a Double Taxation Convention.
Denmark	1401	See Denmark–United Kingdom relations Prime Minister Keir Starmer with Danish Prime Minister Mette Frederiksen in 10 Downing Street, February 2025 The UK established diplomatic relations with Denmark on 25 October 1401.: Denmark maintains an embassy in London.; The United Kingdom is accredited to Denmark through its embassy in Copenhagen.; Both countries share common membership of the Coalition of the Willing, the Council of Europe, the European Court of Human Rights, the International Criminal Court, the Joint Expeditionary Force, NATO, the OECD, the OSCE, the United Nations, and the World Trade Organization. Bilaterally the two countries have a Double Taxation Agreement, and a Voting Participation Agreement.
Estonia	1991	See Estonia–United Kingdom relations Prime Minister Keir Starmer with Estonian Prime Minister Kristen Michal at a JEF summit in Tallinn, December 2024 The UK re-established diplomatic relations with Estonia on 5 September 1991.: Estonia maintains an embassy in London.; The United Kingdom is accredited to Estonia through its embassy in Tallinn.; Both countries share common membership of the Coalition of the Willing, the Council of Europe, European Court of Human Rights, the International Criminal Court, Joint Expeditionary Force, NATO, OECD, OSCE, the United Nations, and the World Trade Organization. Bilaterally, the two countries have a Defence Cooperation Agreement, and a Double Taxation Agreement.
European Union	N/A	See European Union–United Kingdom relations Prime Minister Andy Burnham with European Commission President Ursula von der Leyen at a United Nations General Assembly in New York City, September 2026 The UK was a founding member of the European Union on 1 November 1993; it seceded on 1 January 2021.: Relations between the two are governed by the EU–UK Trade and Cooperation Agreement.; Both the EU and the UK share common membership of the Coalition of the Willing, the G7, the G20, and the World Trade Organization.
Faroe Islands	N/A	See Faroe Islands–United Kingdom relations Foreign Office Minister Lord Howell with Faroese Prime Minister Kaj Leo Johannesen in London, April 2012 The UK maintains relations with the Faroe Islands through its relations with Denmark.: The Faroe Islands maintains a representation in London.; The United Kingdom is accredited to the Faroe Islands through its consulate in Tórshavn.; The UK occupied Faroe Islands from 1940 until 1945, when the Faroe Islands were returned to Denmark. Bilaterally the two countries have a Double Taxation Agreement, and a Free Trade Agreement.
Finland	1919	See Finland–United Kingdom relations Prime Minister Keir Starmer with Finnish President Alexander Stubb in Downing Street, March 2025 The UK established diplomatic relations with Finland on 28 March 1919.: Finland maintains an embassy in London and honorary consulates in Aberdeen, Belfast, Birmingham, Bristol, Cardiff, Dover, Dundee, Edinburgh, Gibraltar, Glasgow, Hamilton, Harwich, Hull, Immingham, Leeds, Lerwick, Liverpool, Manchester, Middlesbrough, Newcastle-Upon-Tyne, Nottingham, Plymouth, Rochester, Sheffield, Southampton and St Helier.; The United Kingdom has an embassy in Helsinki and honorary consulates in Åland, Jyväskylä, Kotka, Kuopio, Oulu, Rovaniemi, Turku, Tampere and Vaasa.; Both countries share common membership of the Coalition of the Willing, the Council of Europe, European Court of Human Rights, the International Criminal Court, Joint Expeditionary Force, NATO, OECD, OSCE, the United Nations, and the World Trade Organization. Bilaterally, the two countries have a mutual defence agreement, and a strategic partnership agreement.
France	1396	See France–United Kingdom relations Prime Minister Andy Burnham with French President Emmanuel Macron in 10 Downing Street, September 2026 The UK established diplomatic relations with France in 1396.: France maintains an embassy in London, and consulates general in London and Edinburgh.; The United Kingdom is accredited to France through its embassy in Paris, and consulates in Bordeaux and Marseille.; Both countries share common membership of the Coalition of the Willing, the Council of Europe, European Court of Human Rights, the G7, the G20, the International Criminal Court, NATO, the OECD, the OSCE, the United Nations, and the World Trade Organization. Bilaterally the two countries have the Combined Joint Expeditionary Force, a Double Taxation Convention, the Lancaster House Treaties, and Maritime Boundary Agreements in the Caribbean and the Pacific.
Germany	1951	See Germany–United Kingdom relations Prime Minister Keir Starmer with German Chancellor Friedrich Merz in Stevenage, July 2025. The UK established diplomatic relations with the Federal Republic of Germany on 20 June 1951.: Germany maintains an embassy in London.; The United Kingdom is accredited to an embassy in Berlin, and consulates generals in Düsseldorf and Munich.; Both countries share common membership of the Coalition of the Willing, the Council of Europe, the European Court of Human Rights, the G7, the G20, the International Criminal Court, NATO, the OECD, the OSCE, the United Nations, and the World Trade Organization. Bilaterally, the two countries have a Double Taxation Convention, and the Kensington Treaty.
Gibraltar	N/A	See Gibraltar–United Kingdom relations Foreign Secretary David Lammy with Gibraltarian Chief Minister Fabian Picardo in Brussels, September 2024 The UK is responsible for Gibraltar's foreign relations as a British Overseas Territory.: Gibraltar maintains a representative office in London.; The United Kingdom is accredited to Gibraltar through its Governer's Office in The Convent.; The UK has governed Gibraltar since 1704. Bilaterally the two countries have a Double Taxation Agreement, and a Reciprocal Healthcare Agreement.
Greece	1834	See Greece–United Kingdom relations Prime Minister Keir Starmer with Greek Prime Minister Kyriakos Mitsotakis in Downing Street, December 2024 The UK established diplomatic relations with Greece in 1834.: Greece maintains an embassy in London, and honorary consulates in Belfast, Birmingham, Edinburgh, Gibraltar, Glasgow, and Leeds.; The United Kingdom is accredited to Greece through its embassy in Athens, and vice consulates in Corfu, Crete, Rhodes, Thessaloniki, and Zakynthos.; The UK governed the Ionian Islands from 1815 to 1864, when they were ceded to Greece. Both countries share common membership of the Coalition of the Willing, the Council of Europe, European Court of Human Rights, the International Criminal Court, NATO, OECD, OSCE, the United Nations, and the World Trade Organization. Bilaterally the two countries have a Defence and Security Agreement, a Double Taxation Agreement, and a Strategic Bilateral Framework.
Guernsey	N/A	See Crown Dependencies The UK is responsible for the foreign relations of Guernsey as a Crown Dependency. The UK has governed Guernsey since 1204. Both countries share common membership of the Crown Dependencies Customs Union. Bilaterally the two countries have a Double Taxation Agreement, and a Reciprocal Healthcare Agreement.
Holy See	1982	See Holy See–United Kingdom relations Prime Minister David Cameron with Pope Benedict XVI in 10 Downing Street, September 2010 The UK established diplomatic relations with the Holy See on 16 January 1982.: The Holy See maintains an apostolic nunciature in London.; The United Kingdom is accredited to the Holy See through its embassy in Rome. (Note: The British embassy to the Holy See is a separate embassy to the British embassy to Italy and San Marino.); Both countries share common membership of the OSCE.
Hungary	1921	See Hungary–United Kingdom relations Prime Minister Boris Johnson with Hungarian Prime Minister Viktor Orbán in 10 Downing Street, May 2021 The UK established diplomatic relations with Hungary on 22 May 1921.: Hungary maintains an embassy in London.; The United Kingdom is accredited to Hungary through its embassy in Budapest.; Both countries share common membership of the Council of Europe, the European Court of Human Rights, the International Criminal Court, NATO, the OECD, the OSCE, the United Nations, and the World Trade Organization. Bilaterally, the two countries have a Double Taxation Convention.
Iceland	1940	See Iceland–United Kingdom relations Prime Minister Theresa May with Icelandic Prime Minister Katrín Jakobsdóttir in 10 Downing Street, May 2019 The UK established diplomatic relations with Iceland on 8 May 1940.: Iceland maintains an embassy in London.; The United Kingdom is accredited to Iceland through its embassy in Reykjavík.; Both countries share common membership of the Atlantic Co-operation Pact, the Coalition of the Willing, Council of Europe, European Court of Human Rights, Joint Expeditionary Force, the International Criminal Court, NATO, OECD, OSCE, the United Nations, and the World Trade Organization. Bilaterally the two countries have a Double Taxation Convention, and a Free Trade Agreement.
Ireland	1922	See Ireland–United Kingdom relations Prime Minister Andy Burnham with Taoiseach Micheál Martin at Number 10 North in Manchester, September 2026 The UK established diplomatic relations with Ireland on 6 December 1922.: Ireland maintains an embassy in London.; The United Kingdom is accredited to Ireland through its an embassy in Dublin.; The UK governed Ireland from the 12th century until 1922, when the Republic of Ireland achieved full independence. Both countries share common membership of the Atlantic co-operation pact, the Coalition of the Willing, the Council of Europe, the European Court of Human Rights, the International Criminal Court, the OECD, the OSCE, the United Nations, and the World Trade Organization. Bilaterally, the two countries have a Common Travel Area and the Good Friday Agreement. The two countries have a sovereignty dispute over the Rockall Bank.
Isle of Man	N/A	See Crown Dependencies The UK is responsible for the foreign relations of the Isle of Man as a Crown Dependency. The UK has governed the Isle of Man since 1399. Both countries share common membership of the Crown Dependencies Customs Union. Bilaterally the two countries have a Double Taxation Agreement, and a Reciprocal Healthcare Agreement.
Italy	1859	See Italy–United Kingdom relations Prime Minister Keir Starmer with Italian Prime Minister Giorgia Meloni in Rome, September 2024 The UK established diplomatic relations with Italy on 13 April 1859.: Italy maintains an embassy in London.; The United Kingdom is accredited to Italy through its embassy in Rome, and a consulate general in Milan.; Both countries share common membership of the Coalition of the Willing, the Council of Europe, the European Court of Human Rights, G7, G20, the International Criminal Court, NATO, the OECD, the OSCE, the United Nations, and the World Trade Organization. Bilaterally, the two countries have an Export and Investment Partnership, and a Double Taxation Convention.
Jersey	N/A	See Crown Dependencies Prime Minister Boris Johnson with Jersey Chief Minister John Le Fondré in 10 Downing Street, November 2021 The UK is responsible for Jersey's foreign relations as a Crown Dependency. The UK has governed the Jersey since 1204. Both countries share common membership of the Crown Dependencies Customs Union. Bilaterally the two countries have a Double Taxation Agreement, and a Reciprocal Healthcare Agreement.
Kosovo	2008	See Kosovo–United Kingdom relations Foreign Secretary Yvette Cooper with Kosovan Prime Minister Albin Kurti in London, October 2025 The UK established diplomatic relations with Kosovo on 18 February 2008.: Kosovo maintains an embassy in London.; The United Kingdom is accredited to Kosovo through its embassy in Pristina.; Bilaterally, the two countries have a Double Taxation Agreement, a Partnership, Trade and Cooperation Agreement, and a Reciprocal Healthcare Agreement.
Latvia	1991	See Latvia–United Kingdom relations Prime Minister Keir Starmer with Latvian Prime Minister Evika Siliņa at a European Political Community summit in Blenheim Palace, July 2024 The UK re-established diplomatic relations with Latvia on 5 September 1991.: Latvia maintains an embassy in London.; The United Kingdom is accredited to Latvia through its embassy in Riga.; Both countries share common membership of the Coalition of the Willing, the Council of Europe, the European Court of Human Rights, the International Criminal Court, the Joint Expeditionary Force, NATO, the OECD, the OSCE, the United Nations, and the World Trade Organization. Bilaterally, the two countries have a Double Taxation Convention.
Liechtenstein	1992	See Liechtenstein–United Kingdom relations Prime Minister Keir Starmer with Liechtensteiner Prime Minister Daniel Risch at a European Political Community summit in Blenheim Palace, July 2024 The UK established diplomatic relations with Liechtenstein on 6 February 1992.: Liechtenstein does not maintain an embassy in the United Kingdom.; The United Kingdom is not accredited to Liechtenstein through an embassy; the UK develops relations through its embassy in Bern, Switzerland.; Both countries share common membership of the Council of Europe, European Court of Human Rights, the International Criminal Court, OSCE, the United Nations, and the World Trade Organization. Bilaterally, the two countries have a Double Taxation Convention, a Free Trade Agreement, a Separation Agreement, a Social Security Coordination Convention, and a Trade Agreement.
Lithuania	1991	See Lithuania–United Kingdom relations Prime Minister Liz Truss with Lithuanian President Gitanas Nauseda at a United Nations General Assembly in New York City, September 2022 The UK re-established diplomatic relations with Lithuania on 4 September 1991.: Lithuania maintains an embassy in London.; The United Kingdom is accredited to Lithuania through its embassy in Vilnius.; Both countries share common membership of the Coalition of the Willing, the Council of Europe, the European Court of Human Rights, the International Criminal Court, the Joint Expeditionary Force, NATO, the OECD, the OSCE, the United Nations, and the World Trade Organization. Bilaterally the two countries have an Investment Agreement.
Luxembourg	1891	See Luxembourg–United Kingdom relations Prime Minister Keir Starmer with Luxembourgish Prime Minister Luc Frieden at a European Political Community summit in Blenheim Palace, July 2024 The UK established diplomatic relations with Luxembourg on 8 June 1891.: Luxembourg maintains an embassy in London.; The United Kingdom is accredited to Luxembourg through its embassy in Luxembourg City.; Both countries share common membership of the Coalition of the Willing, the Council of Europe, the European Court of Human Rights, the International Criminal Court, NATO, the OECD, the OSCE, the United Nations, and the World Trade Organization. Bilaterally, the two countries have a Double Taxation Convention.
Malta	1964	See Malta–United Kingdom relations Prime Minister Boris Johnson with Maltese President George Vella in 10 Downing Street, March 2020 The UK established diplomatic relations with Malta on 7 September 1964.: Malta maintains a high commission in London.; The United Kingdom is accredited to Malta through its high commission in Valletta.; The UK governed Malta from 1800 until 1964, when it achieved full independence. Both countries share common membership of the Commonwealth, the Council of Europe, European Court of Human Rights, the International Criminal Court, the OSCE, the United Nations, and the World Trade Organization. Bilaterally the two countries have a Bilateral Cooperation Framework, and a Double Taxation Convention.
Moldova	1992	See Moldova–United Kingdom relations Foreign Secretary James Cleverly with Moldovan President Maia Sandu in Church House, May 2023 The UK established diplomatic relations with Moldova on 17 January 1992.: Moldova maintains an embassy in London.; The United Kingdom is accredited to Moldova through its embassy in Chișinău.; Both countries share common membership of the Council of Europe, the European Court of Human Rights, the International Criminal Court, the OSCE, the United Nations, the World Health Organization, and the World Trade Organization. Bilaterally the two countries have a Development Partnership, a Double Taxation Convention, and a Strategic Partnership, Trade and Cooperation Agreement.
Monaco	2007	See Monaco–United Kingdom relations Prime Minister Keir Starmer with Monégasque State Minister Pierre Dartout at a European Political Community summit in Blenheim Palace, July 2024 The UK established diplomatic relations with Monaco on 21 September 2007.: Monaco maintains an embassy in London.; The United Kingdom is not accredited to Monaco through an embassy; the UK develops relations through its embassy in Paris, France.; Both countries share common membership of the Council of Europe, the European Court of Human Rights, the OSCE, and the United Nations. Bilaterally, the two countries have a Tax Information Exchange Agreement.
Montenegro	2006	See Montenegro–United Kingdom relations Prime Minister Keir Starmer with Montenegrin Prime Minister Milojko Spajić at a Western Balkans Summit in Lancaster House, October 2025 The UK established diplomatic relations with Montenegro on 13 June 2006.: Montenegro maintains an embassy in London.; The United Kingdom is accredited to Montenegro through its embassy in Podgorica.; Both countries share common membership of the Coalition of the Willing, the Council of Europe, European Court of Human Rights, the International Criminal Court, NATO, OSCE, the United Nations, and the World Trade Organization. Bilaterally, the two countries have a Double Taxation Convention, and a Reciprocal Healthcare Agreement.
Netherlands	1603	See Netherlands–United Kingdom relations Prime Minister Keir Starmer with Dutch Prime Minister Rob Jetten in 10 Downing Street, April 2026 The UK established diplomatic relations with the Netherlands on 1 April 1603.: The Netherlands maintains an embassy in London.; The United Kingdom is accredited to the Netherlands through its embassy in The Hague.; Both countries share common membership of the Atlantic Co-operation Pact, the Coalition of the Willing, the Council of Europe, the European Court of Human Rights, the International Criminal Court, the Joint Expeditionary Force, NATO, the OECD, the OSCE, the United Nations, and the World Trade Organization. Bilaterally, the two countries have a Double Taxation Convention.
North Macedonia	1993	See North Macedonia–United Kingdom relations Prime Minister Keir Starmer with North Macedonian Prime Minister Hristijan Mickoski at a European Political Community summit in Tirana, May 2025 The UK established diplomatic relations with North Macedonia on 16 December 1993.: North Macedonia maintains an embassy in London.; The United Kingdom is accredited to North Macedonia through its embassy in Skopje.; Both countries share common membership of the Council of Europe, European Court of Human Rights, the International Criminal Court, NATO, OSCE, the United Nations, and the World Trade Organization. Bilaterally, the two countries have a Partnership, Trade and Cooperation Agreement.
Norway	1905	See Norway–United Kingdom relations Prime Minister Keir Starmer with Norwegian Prime Minister Jonas Gahr Støre in 10 Downing Street, December 2025 The UK established diplomatic relations with Norway on 6 November 1905.: Norway maintains an embassy in London, and an honoury consulate general in Edinburgh.; The United Kingdom is accredited to Norway through its embassy in Oslo.; Both countries share common membership of the Atlantic Co-operation Pact, the Coalition of the Willing, the Council of Europe, the European Court of Human Rights, the International Criminal Court, the Joint Expeditionary Force, NATO, the OECD, the OSCE, the United Nations, and the World Trade Organization. Bilaterally the two countries have a Free Trade Agreement, a Green Partnership, and a Strategic Partnership Agreement.
Poland	1919	See Poland–United Kingdom relations Prime Minister Keir Starmer with Polish Prime Minister Donald Tusk in Warsaw, January 2025 The UK established diplomatic relations with Poland on 15 July 1919.: Poland maintains an embassy in London.; The United Kingdom is accredited to Poland through its embassy in Warsaw.; Both countries share common membership of the Coalition of the Willing, the Council of Europe, European Court of Human Rights, the International Criminal Court, NATO, OECD, OSCE, Trilateral Security Pact, the United Nations, and the World Trade Organization. Bilaterally the two countries have a Defence and Security Agreement, a Double Tax Convention, and a Strategic Partnership.
Portugal	1386	See Portugal–United Kingdom relations Prime Minister Boris Johnson with Portuguese Prime Minister António Costa in 10 Downing Street, June 2022 The UK established diplomatic relations with Portugal on 9 May 1386.: Portugal maintains an embassy and a consulate general in London and consulates in Belfast, Edinburgh, Hamilton, and St Helier.; The United Kingdom is accredited to Portugal through its embassy in Lisbon, and a vice consulate in Portimão.; Both countries share common membership of the Atlantic Co-operation Pact, the Coalition of the Willing, the Council of Europe, European Court of Human Rights, the International Criminal Court, NATO, the OECD, the OSCE, the United Nations, the World Health Organization, and the World Trade Organization. Bilaterally, the two countries have the Anglo-Portuguese Alliance and a Double Taxation Convention.
Romania	1880	See Romania–United Kingdom relations Prime Minister Keir Starmer with Romanian Prime Minister Marcel Ciolacu in 10 Downing Street, November 2024 The UK established diplomatic relations with Romania on 20 February 1880.: Romania maintains an embassy in London, and consulates general in Edinburgh and Manchester. Romania also maintains honorary consulates in Hirwaun, Leeds, Morpeth-Newcastle and Southampton.; The United Kingdom is accredited to Romania through its embassy in Bucharest.; Both countries share common membership of the Coalition of the Willing, the Council of Europe, European Court of Human Rights, the International Criminal Court, NATO, the OSCE, the United Nations, and the World Trade Organization. Bilaterally the two countries have a Defence Cooperation Agreement, and a Double Taxation Convention.
Russia	1553	See Russia–United Kingdom relations Prime Minister Theresa May with Russian President Vladimir Putin in Hangzhou, September 2016 The UK established diplomatic relations with Russia on 24 August 1553.: Russia maintains an embassy in London.; The United Kingdom is accredited to Russia through its embassy in Moscow, and a consulate in Yekaterinburg.; In March 2022, the United Kingdom was added to Russia's unfriendly countries list. Both countries share common membership of the European Court of Human Rights, G20, the OSCE, the UNSC P5 and the United Nations. Bilaterally the two countries have an Investment Agreement.
San Marino	1998	See San Marino–United Kingdom relations The UK established diplomatic relations with San Marino on 18 November 1998.: San Marino does not maintain an embassy in the United Kingdom.; The United Kingdom is not accredited to San Marino through an embassy; the UK develops relations through its embassy in Rome, Italy.; Both countries share common membership of the Council of Europe, European Court of Human Rights, the International Criminal Court, OSCE, the United Nations, and the World Health Organization. Bilaterally, the two countries have a Double Taxation Convention and a Tax Information Exchange Agreement.
Serbia	1870	See Serbia–United Kingdom relations Prime Minister Keir Starmer with Serbian Prime Minister Đuro Macut at a Western Balkans Summit in Lancaster House, October 2025 The UK established full diplomatic relations with Serbia on 7 February 1870.: Serbia maintains an embassy in London.; The United Kingdom is accredited to Serbia through its embassy in Belgrade.; Both countries are members of the Council of Europe, the European Court of Human Rights, the International Criminal Court, the OSCE, and the United Nations. Bilaterally, the two countries have a Double Taxation Convention, an Investment Agreement, a Partnership, Trade and Cooperation Agreement, and a Reciprocal Healthcare Agreement.
Slovakia	1993	See Slovakia–United Kingdom relations Prime Minister Boris Johnson with Slovak Prime Minister Eduard Heger in Lancaster House, March 2022 The UK established diplomatic relations with Slovakia on 1 January 1993.: Slovakia maintains an embassy in London.; The United Kingdom is accredited to Slovakia through its embassy in Bratislava.; Both countries share common membership of the Council of Europe, the European Court of Human Rights, the International Criminal Court, NATO, the OECD, the OSCE, the United Nations, and the World Trade Organization. Bilaterally, the two countries have a Double Taxation Convention.
Slovenia	1992	See Slovenia–United Kingdom relations Prime Minister Keir Starmer with Slovenian Prime Minister Robert Golob at a European Political Community summit in Blenheim Palace, July 2024 The UK established diplomatic relations with Slovenia on 15 January 1992.: Slovenia maintains an embassy in London.; The United Kingdom is accredited to Slovenia through its embassy in Ljubljana.; Both countries share common membership of the Coalition of the Willing, the Council of Europe, the European Court of Human Rights, the International Criminal Court, NATO, the OECD, the OSCE, the United Nations, and the World Trade Organization. Bilaterally, the two countries have a Double Taxation Convention, and an Investment Agreement.
Sovereign Military Order of Malta	2024	See Foreign relations of the Sovereign Military Order of Malta The UK established official relations with Sovereign Military Order of Malta on 9 October 2024.: The Sovereign Military Order of Malta maintains the Grand Priory of England in London.; The United Kingdom is not accredited to the Sovereign Military Order of Malta through a mission.
Spain	1509	See Spain–United Kingdom relations Prime Minister Andy Burnham with Spanish Prime Minister Pedro Sánchez at a United Nations General Assembly in New York City, September 2026 The UK established diplomatic relations with Spain in 1509.: Spain maintains an embassy in London.; The United Kingdom is accredited to Spain through its embassy in Madrid, a consulate general Barcelona, and consulates in Alicante, Ibiza, Las Palmas, Málaga, Palma de Mallorca, and Santa Cruz de Tenerife.; Both countries share common membership of the Atlantic Co-operation Pact, the Coalition of the Willing, the Council of Europe, the European Court of Human Rights, the International Criminal Court, NATO, the OECD, the OSCE, the United Nations, and the World Trade Organization. Bilaterally, the two countries have a Double Taxation Convention.
Sweden	1653	See Sweden–United Kingdom relations Prime Minister Keir Starmer with Swedish Prime Minister Ulf Kristersson at a JEF summit in Tallinn, December 2024 The UK established diplomatic relations with Sweden on 23 December 1653.: Sweden maintains an embassy in London.; The United Kingdom is accredited to Sweden through its embassy in Stockholm.; Both countries share common membership of the Coalition of the Willing, the Council of Europe, the European Court of Human Rights, the International Criminal Court, the Joint Expeditionary Force, NATO, the OECD, the OSCE, the United Nations, and the World Trade Organization. Bilaterally the two countries have a Double Taxation Convention, a Mutual Defence Agreement, and a Strategic Partnership.
Switzerland	1891	See Switzerland–United Kingdom relations Prime Minister Keir Starmer with Swiss President Viola Amherd at a European Political Community summit in Blenheim Palace, July 2024 The UK established diplomatic relations with Switzerland in 1891.: Switzerland maintains an embassy in London, an honorary consulate general in Edinburgh, and honorary consulates in Belfast, Bermuda, Cardiff, the Cayman Islands, Gibraltar, and Manchester.; The United Kingdom is accredited to Switzerland through its embassy in Bern.; Both countries share common membership of the Council of Europe, European Court of Human Rights, the International Criminal Court, OECD, OSCE, the United Nations, and the World Trade Organization. Bilaterally, the two countries have the Berne Financial Services Agreement, a Double Taxation Convention, and a Trade Agreement. The two countries are currently negotiating a Free Trade Agreement.
Ukraine	1992	See Ukraine–United Kingdom relations Prime Minister Andy Burnham with Ukrainian President Volodymyr Zelenskyy in 10 Downing Street, October 2026 The UK established diplomatic relations with Ukraine on 10 January 1992.: Ukraine maintains an embassy in London, and a consulate in Edinburgh.; The United Kingdom is accredited to Ukraine through its embassy in Kyiv.; Both countries share common membership of the Coalition of the Willing, the Council of Europe, the European Court of Human Rights, the OSCE, a Trilateral Security Pact, the United Nations, and the World Trade Organization. Bilaterally, the two countries have a Development Partnership, a Digital Trade Agreement, a Double Tax Convention, a Security Agreement, and a Political, Free Trade and Strategic Partnership Agreement.

=== North America ===
Country	Since	Notes
Anguilla	N/A	See British Overseas Territories Foreign Secretary Boris Johnson with Anguillan Chief Minister Victor Banks in London, November 2016 The UK is responsible for Anguilla's foreign relations as a British Overseas Territory.: Anguilla maintains a representative office in London.; The United Kingdom is accredited to Anguilla through its Governer's Office in The Valley.; The UK has governed Anguilla since 1650. Bilaterally, the two countries have a Tax Information Exchange Agreement, and a Reciprocal Healthcare Agreement.
Antigua and Barbuda	1981	See Antigua and Barbuda–United Kingdom relations Prime Minister Andy Burnham with Antiguan Prime Minister Gaston Browne at a Commonwealth summit in Antigua, November 2026 The UK established diplomatic relations with Antigua and Barbuda on 1 November 1981. Both countries are Commonwealth Realms.: Antigua and Barbuda maintains a high commission in London.; The United Kingdom is accredited to Antigua and Barbuda through its high commission in Saint John's.; The UK governed Antigua and Barbuda from 1632 to 1981, when it achieved full independence. Both countries share common membership of the Caribbean Development Bank, the Commonwealth, the International Criminal Court, the United Nations, and the World Trade Organization, as well as the CARIFORUM–UK Economic Partnership Agreement.
The Bahamas	1973	See The Bahamas–United Kingdom relations The UK established diplomatic relations with the Bahamas on 10 July 1973. Both countries are Commonwealth Realms.: The Bahamas maintains a high commission in London.; The United Kingdom is accredited to the Bahamas through its high commission in Nassau.; The UK governed the Bahamas from 1648 to 1973, when the Bahamas achieved full independence. Both countries share common membership of the Caribbean Development Bank, the Commonwealth, the International Criminal Court, the United Nations, and the World Trade Organization, as well as the CARIFORUM–UK Economic Partnership Agreement. Bilaterally the two countries have a Tax Information Exchange Agreement.
Barbados	1966	See Barbados–United Kingdom relations Prime Minister Andy Burnham with Barbadian Prime Minister Mia Mottley at a Commonwealth summit in Antigua, November 2026 The UK established diplomatic relations with Barbados on 30 November 1966.: Barbados maintains a high commission in London.; The United Kingdom is accredited to Barbados through its high commission in Bridgetown.; The UK governed Barbados from 1625 to 1966, when Barbados achieved full independence. Both countries share common membership of the Caribbean Development Bank, the Commonwealth, the International Criminal Court, the United Nations, and the World Trade Organization, as well as the CARIFORUM–UK Economic Partnership Agreement. Bilaterally the two countries have an Investment Agreement.
Belize	1981	See Belize–United Kingdom relations Foreign Secretary William Hague with Belizean Prime Minister Dean Barrow in London, June 2013 The UK established diplomatic relations with Belize on 21 September 1981. Both countries are Commonwealth Realms.: Belize maintains a high commission in London.; The United Kingdom is accredited to Belize from its high commission in Belmopan.; The UK governed Belize from 1783 to 1981, when Belize achieved full independence. Both countries share common membership of the Atlantic Co-operation Pact, Caribbean Development Bank, the Commonwealth, the International Criminal Court, the United Nations, and the World Trade Organization, as well as the CARIFORUM–UK Economic Partnership Agreement. Bilaterally the two countries have a Defence Cooperation Agreement, and an Investment Agreement.
British Virgin Islands	N/A	See British Overseas Territories Foreign Secretary Boris Johnson with British Virgin Islands Premier Orlando Smith in London, November 2016 The UK is responsible for the British Virgin Islands's foreign relations as a British Overseas Territory.: The British Virgin Islands maintains a representative office in London.; The United Kingdom is accredited to the British Virgin Islands through its Governer's Office in Tortola.; The UK has governed British Virgin Islands since 1672. Bilaterally, the two countries have a Double Taxation Agreement, and a Reciprocal Healthcare Agreement.
Canada	1926	See Canada–United Kingdom relations Prime minister Andy Burnham with Canadian Prime Minister Mark Carney at Hill Dickinson Stadium in Liverpool, September 2026 The UK established diplomatic relations with Canada on 1 July 1926. Both countries are Commonwealth Realms.: Canada maintains a high commission in London.; The United Kingdom is accredited to Canada through its high commission in Ottawa, and consulate generals in Calgary, Montreal, Toronto, and Vancouver.; The UK governed Canada from 1783 to 1931, when Canada achieved full independence. Both countries share common membership of the Atlantic Co-operation Pact, the Coalition of the Willing, the Commonwealth, CPTPP, Five Eyes, the G7, the G20, the International Criminal Court, NATO, the OECD, the OSCE, the UKUSA Agreement, the United Nations, and the World Trade Organization. Bilaterally, the two countries have a Double Taxation Convention, and a Trade Continuity Agreement.
Costa Rica	1848	See Costa Rica–United Kingdom relations The UK established diplomatic relations with Costa Rica on 28 February 1848.: Costa Rica maintains an embassy in London.; The United Kingdom is accredited to Costa Rica from its embassy in San José.; Both countries share common membership of the Atlantic Co-operation Pact, the International Criminal Court, the OECD, the United Nations, and the World Trade Organization, as well as the Central America–UK Association Agreement. Bilaterally the two countries have an Investment Agreement.
Cuba	1902	See Cuba–United Kingdom relations Foreign Office Minister Hugo Swire with Cuban Ambassador to the UK Esther Gloria Armenteros Cárdenas in London, December 2012 The UK established diplomatic relations with Cuba on 20 May 1902.: Cuba maintains an embassy in London.; United Kingdom is accredited to Cuba from its embassy in Havana.; Both countries are members of the United Nations and the World Trade Organization. Bilaterally the two countries have an Investment Agreement, and a Political Dialogue and Co-operation Agreement.
Dominica	1978	See Dominica–United Kingdom relations Foreign Secretary James Cleverly with Dominican President Charles Savarin in Lancaster House, May 2023 The UK established diplomatic relations with Dominica on 13 December 1978.: Dominica maintains a high commission in London.; The United Kingdom is not accredited to Dominica through a high commission; the UK develops relations through its high commission in Bridgetown, Barbados.; The UK governed Dominica from 1763 to 1978, when Dominica achieved full independence. Both countries share common membership of the Atlantic Co-operation Pact, Caribbean Development Bank, the Commonwealth, the International Criminal Court, the United Nations, the World Health Organization, and the World Trade Organization, as well as the CARIFORUM–UK Economic Partnership Agreement. Bilaterally the two countries have a Tax Information Exchange Agreement, an Investment Agreement.
Dominican Republic	1850	See Dominican Republic–United Kingdom relations Foreign Office Minister David Rutley with Dominican Republic President Luis Abinader in London, May 2023 The UK established diplomatic relations with the Dominican Republic on 6 March 1850.: Dominican Republic maintains an embassy in London.; The United Kingdom is accredited to the Dominican Republic from its embassy in Santo Domingo.; Both countries share common membership of the Atlantic Co-operation Pact, the International Criminal Court, the United Nations, and the World Trade Organization, as well as the CARIFORUM–UK Economic Partnership Agreement. Bilaterally the two countries have a Maritime Boundary Agreement.
El Salvador	1883	See El Salvador–United Kingdom relations British Ambassador to El Salvador Bernhard Garside with Salvadoran President Salvador Sánchez Cerén in San Salvador, March 2015 The UK established diplomatic relations with El Salvador in 1883.: El Salvador maintains an embassy in London.; The United Kingdom is accredited to El Salvador from its embassy in San Salvador.; Both countries share common membership of the International Criminal Court, the United Nations, and the World Trade Organization, as well as the Central America–UK Association Agreement. Bilaterally the two countries have an Investment Agreement.
Greenland	N/A	See Greenland–United Kingdom relations The UK maintains relations with Greenland through its relations with Denmark.: Greenland does not maintain a representation in the United Kingdom; Greenland develops relations with the UK through the Danish embassy in London.; The United Kingdom is accredited to Greenland through its consulate in Nuuk.; Bilaterally, the two countries are negotiating a Free Trade Agreement.
Grenada	1974	See Grenada–United Kingdom relations The UK established diplomatic relations with Grenada on 7 February 1974. Both countries are Commonwealth Realms.: Grenada maintains a high commission in London.; The United Kingdom is accredited to Grenada through its high commission in Saint George's.; The UK governed Grenada from 1762 until 1974, when Grenada achieved full independence. Both countries share common membership of the Caribbean Development Bank, the Commonwealth, the International Criminal Court, the United Nations, and the World Trade Organization, as well as the CARIFORUM–UK Economic Partnership Agreement.
Guatemala	1837	See Guatemala–United Kingdom relations Foreign Office Minister Hugo Swire with Guatemalan Foreign Minister Carlos Raúl Morales in London, November 2014 The UK established diplomatic relations with Guatemala on 12 July 1837.: Guatemala maintains an embassy in London.; The United Kingdom is accredited to Guatemala from its embassy in Guatemala City.; Both countries share common membership of the Atlantic Co-operation Pact, the International Criminal Court, the United Nations, and the World Trade Organization, as well as the Central America–UK Association Agreement.
Haiti	1859	See Haiti–United Kingdom relations The UK established diplomatic relations with Haiti on 13 May 1859.: Haiti maintains an embassy in London.; The United Kingdom is accredited to Haiti from its embassy in Port-au-Prince.; Both countries are members of the United Nations and the World Trade Organization. Bilaterally the two countries have an Investment Agreement.
Honduras	1849	See Honduras–United Kingdom relations The UK established diplomatic relations with Honduras on 16 June 1849.: Honduras maintains an embassy in London.; The United Kingdom is not accredited to Honduras through an embassy; the UK is accredited to Honduras through its embassy in Guatemala City.; The UK governed the Mosquito Coast from 1638 to 1787 and from 1816 to 1819. Both countries share common membership of the International Criminal Court, the United Nations, the World Health Organization, and the World Trade Organization, as well as the Central America–UK Association Agreement.
Jamaica	1962	See Jamaica–United Kingdom relations Prime Minister Andy Burnham with Jamaican Prime Minister Andrew Holness at a Commonwealth summit in Antigua, November 2026 The UK established diplomatic relations with Jamaica on 2 August 1962. Both countries are Commonwealth Realms.: Jamaica maintains a high commission in London.; The United Kingdom is accredited to Jamaica through its high commission in Kingston.; The UK governed Jamaica from 1655 to 1962, when Jamaica achieved full independence. Both countries share common membership of the Caribbean Development Bank, the Commonwealth, the International Criminal Court, the United Nations, and the World Trade Organization, as well as the CARIFORUM–UK Economic Partnership Agreement. Bilaterally the two countries have an Investment Agreement.
Mexico	1826	See Mexico–United Kingdom relations Foreign Secretary Yvette Cooper with Mexican Foreign Secretary Juan Ramón de la Fuente in Toronto, November 2025 The UK established diplomatic relations with Mexico on 26 December 1826.: Mexico maintains a high commission in London.; The United Kingdom is accredited to Mexico through its embassy in Mexico City, and a consulate general in Cancún.; Both countries share common membership of CPTPP, the G20, the International Criminal Court, the OECD, the United Nations, and the World Trade Organization. Bilaterally, the two countries have a Double Taxation Convention, an Investment Agreement, and a Trade Continuity Agreement. Additionally the two countries are negotiating a Free Trade Agreement.
Montserrat	N/A	See Montserrat–United Kingdom relations The UK is responsible for Montserrat's foreign relations as a British Overseas Territory.: Montserrat maintains a representative office in London.; The United Kingdom is accredited to Montserrat through its Governer's Office in Brades.; The UK has governed Montserrat since 1632. Bilaterally the two countries have a Double Taxation Arrangement, and a Reciprocal Healthcare Agreement.
Nicaragua	1859	See Nicaragua–United Kingdom relations Foreign Secretary William Hague with Nicaraguan Foreign Minister Samuel Santos López in London, November 2013 The UK established diplomatic relations with Nicaragua on 18 January 1859.: Nicaragua maintains an embassy in London.; The United Kingdom is accredited to Nicaragua from its embassy in San Jose, Costa Rica; there is no British embassy in Nicaragua.; The UK governed the Mosquito Coast from 1638 to 1787 and from 1816 to 1819. Both countries share common membership of the United Nations, and the World Trade Organization, as well as the Central America–UK Association Agreement. Bilaterally the two countries have an Investment Agreement.
Panama	1908	See Panama–United Kingdom relations Prime Minister Theresa May with Panamanian President Juan Carlos Varela in 10 Downing Street, May 2018 The UK established diplomatic relations with Panama on 9 April 1908.: Panama maintains an embassy in London.; The United Kingdom is accredited to Panama from its embassy in Panama City.; Both countries share common membership of the International Criminal Court, the United Nations, the World Health Organization, and the World Trade Organization, as well as the Central America–United Kingdom Association Agreement. Bilaterally the two countries have a Double Taxation Convention, and an Investment Agreement.
Puerto Rico	N/A	See Foreign and intergovernmental relations of Puerto Rico The UK maintains relations with Puerto Rico through its relations with the United States.: Puerto Rico does not maintain a representation in the United Kingdom; Puerto Rico develops relations with the UK through the US embassy in London.; The United Kingdom is accredited to Puerto Rico through its consulate in San Juan.
Saint Kitts and Nevis	1983	See Saint Kitts and Nevis–United Kingdom relations The UK established diplomatic relations with Saint Kitts and Nevis on 19 September 1983. Both countries are Commonwealth Realms.: Saint Kitts and Nevis maintains a high commission in London.; The United Kingdom is accredited to Saint Kitts and Nevis from its high commission in Bridgetown; there is no British high commission in Saint Kitts and Nevis.; The UK governed Saint Kitts and Nevis from the 17th century to 1983, when Saint Kitts and Nevis achieved full independence. Both countries share common membership of the Caribbean Development Bank, the Commonwealth, the International Criminal Court, the United Nations, and the World Trade Organization, as well as the CARIFORUM–UK Economic Partnership Agreement.
Saint Lucia	1979	See Saint Lucia–United Kingdom relations Foreign Secretary William Hague with Saint Lucian Prime Minister Stephenson King in Lancaster House, April 2011 The UK established diplomatic relations with Saint Lucia in 1979. Both countries are Commonwealth Realms.: Saint Lucia maintains a high commission in London.; The United Kingdom is accredited to its high commission in Castries.; The UK governed Saint Lucia from 1803 to 1979, when Saint Lucia achieved full independence. Both countries share common membership of the Caribbean Development Bank, Commonwealth, the International Criminal Court, the United Nations, the World Trade Organization, and the CARIFORUM–UK Economic Partnership Agreement. Bilaterally the two countries have an Investment Agreement.
Saint Vincent and the Grenadines	1979	See Saint Vincent and the Grenadines–United Kingdom relations Foreign Secretary David Lammy with [Vincentian prime minister Ralph Gonsalves in London, December 2024 The UK established diplomatic relations with Saint Vincent and the Grenadines on 27 October 1979. Both countries are Commonwealth Realms.: Saint Vincent and the Grenadines maintains a high commission in London.; The United Kingdom is accredited to its high commission in Kingstown.; The UK governed Saint Vincent and the Grenadines as part of the Windward Islands colony from 1833 to 1979, when Saint Vincent and the Grenadines achieved full independence. Both countries share common membership of the Caribbean Development Bank, Commonwealth, the International Criminal Court, the United Nations, the World Trade Organization, and the CARIFORUM–UK Economic Partnership Agreement.
Trinidad and Tobago	1962	See Trinidad and Tobago–United Kingdom relations Foreign Secretary Ed Miliband with Trinidadian Foreign Minister Sean Sobers at a Commonwealth summit in Antigua, November 2026 The UK established diplomatic relations with Trinidad and Tobago on 31 August 1962.: Trinidad and Tobago maintains a high commission in London.; The United Kingdom is accredited to its high commission in Port of Spain.; The UK governed Trinidad and Tobago from 1797 to 1962, when Trinidad and Tobago achieved full independence. Both countries share common membership of the Caribbean Development Bank, the Commonwealth, the International Criminal Court, the United Nations, the World Trade Organization, and the CARIFORUM–UK Economic Partnership Agreement. Bilaterally the two countries have a Double Taxation Convention,
United States	1785	See United Kingdom–United States relations Prime Minister Andy Burnham with US President Donald Trump at a United Nations General Assembly in New York City, September 2026 The UK established diplomatic relations with the United States on 1 June 1785. UK–US diplomatic relations is commonly described as the "Special Relationship".: The United States maintains an embassy in London.; The United Kingdom is accredited to the United States through its embassy in Washington, D.C. The UK also maintains consulate generals in Atlanta, Boston, Chicago, Houston, Los Angeles, Miami, New York City, and San Francisco.; The UK governed the United States from 1585 to 1783, when the United States achieved full independence. Both countries share common membership of the Atlantic Co-operation Pact, AUKUS, Five Eyes, the G7, the G20, NATO, the OECD, the OSCE, the UKUSA Agreement, the UNSC P5, the United Nations, and the World Trade Organization. Bilaterally, the two countries have a Double Taxation Convention, an Economic Prosperity Deal, and a Mutual Defence Agreement.

=== Oceania ===
Country	Since	Notes
Australia	1936	See Australia–United Kingdom relations Prime Minister Andy Burnham with Australian Prime Minister Anthony Albanese at a Commonwealth summit in Antigua, November 2026 The UK established diplomatic relations with Australia in March 1936. Both countries are Commonwealth Realms.: Australia maintains a high commission in London.; The United Kingdom is accredited to Australia through its high commission in Canberra, the UK also maintains consulate generals in Brisbane, Melbourne, and Sydney, additionally the United Kingdom maintains a consulate in Perth.; The UK governed Australia from the late 18th century until 1942, when Australia achieved full independence. Both countries share common membership of AUKUS, the Coalition of the Willing, the Commonwealth, CPTPP, Five Eyes, the Five Power Defence Arrangements, the G20, the International Criminal Court, OECD, the UKUSA Agreement, the United Nations, the World Health Organization, and the World Trade Organization. Bilaterally the two countries have a Climate and Energy Partnership, Defence Agreement, a Double Taxation Agreement, a Free Trade Agreement, and a Reciprocal Healthcare Agreement.
Cook Islands	N/A	See Foreign relations of the Cook Islands Foreign Secretary James Cleverly with Cook Islander Prime Minister Mark Brown at a United Nations General Assembly in New York City, September 2023 The UK has not established diplomatic relations with the Cook Islands; it does not recognise the Cook Islands as a sovereign nation.: The Cook Islands does not maintain an embassy in the United Kingdom.; The United Kingdom is not accredited to the Cook Islands through an embassy; the UK develops relations through its high commission in Wellington, New Zealand.; The UK governed the Cook Islands from 1888 until 1901, when the Cook Islands were transferred to New Zealand. Both countries share common membership of the World Health Organization.
Federated States of Micronesia	1992	See Foreign relations of the Federated States of Micronesia The UK established diplomatic relations with the Federated States of Micronesia on 31 August 1992.: Federated States of Micronesia does not maintain an embassy in the United Kingdom.; The United Kingdom is not accredited to the Federated States of Micronesia through an embassy; the UK develops relations through its high commission in Suva, Fiji.; Both countries are members of the United Nations and the World Health Organization.
Fiji	1970	See Fiji–United Kingdom relations Foreign Secretary David Cameron with Fijian Prime Minister Sitiveni Rabuka in London, May 2024 The UK established diplomatic relations with Fiji on 10 October 1970.: Fiji maintains a high commission in London.; The United Kingdom is accredited to Fiji through its high commission in Suva.; The UK governed Fiji from 1874 until 1970, when Fiji achieved full independence. Both countries share common membership of the Commonwealth, the International Criminal Court, the United Nations, the World Health Organization, and the World Trade Organization, as well as the Pacific States–United Kingdom Economic Partnership Agreement. Bilaterally the two countries have a Double Taxation Convention.
Kiribati	1979	See Kiribati–United Kingdom relations The UK established diplomatic relations with Kiribati on 12 July 1979.: Kiribati does not maintain a high commission in the United Kingdom.; The United Kingdom is not accredited to Kiribati through a high commission; the UK develops relations through its high commission in Suva, Fiji.; The UK governed Kiribati from 1892 until 1979, when Kiribati achieved full independence as an independent Commonwealth republic. Both countries are members of the Commonwealth, the International Criminal Court, the United Nations, and the World Health Organization. Bilaterally, the two countries have a Double Taxation Agreement.
Marshall Islands	1992	See Marshall Islands–United Kingdom relations The UK established diplomatic relations with the Marshall Islands on 2 February 1992.: The Marshall Islands does not maintain an embassy in the United Kingdom.; The United Kingdom is not accredited to the Marshall Islands through an embassy; the UK develops relations through its high commission in Suva, Fiji.; Both countries share common membership of the International Criminal Court, the United Nations, and the World Health Organization. Bilaterally, the two countries have a Tax Information Exchange Agreement.
Nauru	1977	See Nauru–United Kingdom relations British Pacific Minister Zac Goldsmith with Nauruan President Russ Kun in London, May 2023 The UK established diplomatic relations with Nauru on 1 December 1977.: Nauru does not maintain an embassy in the United Kingdom.; The United Kingdom is not accredited to Nauru through an embassy; the UK develops relations through its high commission in Honiara, Solomon Islands.; The UK was an administrative authority for the League of Nations mandate and UN trust territory over Nauru, along with Australia and New Zealand, until Nauru was granted independence by Australia in 1968. Both countries share common membership of the Commonwealth, the International Criminal Court, the United Nations, and the World Health Organization.
New Zealand	1939	See New Zealand–United Kingdom relations Prime Minister Keir Starmer with New Zealand Prime Minister Christopher Luxon at a Commonwealth summit in Apia, October 2024 The UK established diplomatic relations with New Zealand in March 1939. Both countries are Commonwealth Realms.: New Zealand maintains a high commission in London.; The United Kingdom is accredited to New Zealand through its high commission in Wellington, in addition to a consulate general in Auckland.; The UK governed New Zealand from 1840 until 1947, when New Zealand achieved full independence. Both countries share common membership of the Coalition of the Willing, the Commonwealth, CPTPP, Five Eyes, the Five Power Defence Arrangements, the International Criminal Court, OECD, the UKUSA Agreement, the United Nations, the World Health Organization, and the World Trade Organization. Bilaterally the two countries have Free Trade Agreement, and a Reciprocal Healthcare Agreement.
Niue	N/A	See Niue–United Kingdom relations The UK has not established diplomatic relations with Niue; it does not recognise Niue as a sovereign nation.: Niue does not maintain an embassy in the United Kingdom.; The United Kingdom is not accredited to Niue through an embassy; the UK develops relations through its high commission in Wellington, New Zealand.; The UK governed Niue from 1900 until 1901, when Niue was transferred to New Zealand. Both countries share common membership of the World Health Organization.
Palau	1996	See Foreign relations of Palau The UK established diplomatic relations with Palau on 16 August 1996.: Palau does not maintain an embassy in the United Kingdom.; The United Kingdom is not accredited to Palau through an embassy; the UK develops relations through its embassy in Manila, Philippines.; Both countries are members of the United Nations and the World Health Organization.
Papua New Guinea	1975	See Papua New Guinea–United Kingdom relations Foreign Secretary James Cleverly with Papua New Guinean Prime Minister James Marape in Port Moresby, April 2023 The UK established diplomatic relations with Papua New Guinea on 16 September 1975. Both countries are Commonwealth Realms.: Papua New Guinea maintains a high commission in London.; The United Kingdom is accredited to Fiji through its high commission in Port Moresby.; The UK governed Papua New Guinea from 1884 until 1906, when the territory was transferred to Australia. Both countries share common membership of the Commonwealth, the International Criminal Court, the United Nations, the World Health Organization, and the World Trade Organization, as well as the Pacific States–United Kingdom Economic Partnership Agreement. Bilaterally the two countries have a Double Taxation Convention, an Investment Agreement, and a Security Agreement.
Samoa	1970	See Samoa–United Kingdom relations Prime Minister Keir Starmer with Samoan Prime Minister Fiamē Naomi Mataʻafa at a Commonwealth summit in Apia, October 2024 The UK established diplomatic relations with Samoa in September 1970.: Samoa is not accredited to the UK through an embassy; Samoa develops relations through its embassy in Brussels, Belgium.; The United Kingdom is accredited to Samoa through its high commission in Apia.; Both countries share common membership of the Commonwealth, the International Criminal Court, the United Nations, the World Health Organization, and the World Trade Organization, as well as the Pacific States–United Kingdom Economic Partnership Agreement.
Solomon Islands	1978	See Solomon Islands–United Kingdom relations The UK established diplomatic relations with the Solomon Islands on 7 July 1978. Both countries are Commonwealth Realms.: Solomon Islands does not maintain a high commission in the United Kingdom.; The United Kingdom is accredited to the Solomon Islands through its high commission in Honiara.; The UK governed the Solomon Islands from 1893 until 1978, when the Solomon Islands achieved full independence. Both countries share common membership of the Commonwealth, the United Nations, the World Health Organization, and the World Trade Organization, as well as the Pacific States–United Kingdom Economic Partnership Agreement. Bilaterally the two countries have a Double Taxation Agreement.
Tonga	1970	See Tonga–United Kingdom relations Prime Minister Andy Burnham and King Charles III with Tongan Prime Minister Lord Fatafehi Fakafānua and Mauritian Prime Minister Navin Ramgoolam at a Commonwealth summit in Antigua, November 2026 The UK established diplomatic relations with Tonga on 4 June 1970.: Tonga maintains a high commission in London.; The United Kingdom is accredited to Tonga through its high commission in Nuku'Alofa.; The UK governed Tonga from 1900 until 1970, when Tonga achieved full independence. Both countries share common membership of the Commonwealth, the United Nations, the World Health Organization, and the World Trade Organization. Bilaterally the two countries have an Investment Agreement.
Tuvalu	1978	See Tuvalu–United Kingdom relations The UK established diplomatic relations with Tuvalu on 1 October 1978.: Tuvalu maintains an honorary consulate in London.; The United Kingdom is not accredited to Tuvalu through a high commission; the UK develops relations through its high commission in Suva, Fiji.; The UK governed Tuvalu from 1892 until 1978, when Tuvalu achieved full independence. Both countries share common membership of the Commonwealth, the United Nations, and the World Health Organization. Bilaterally, the two countries have a Double Taxation Arrangement.
Vanuatu	1980	See United Kingdom–Vanuatu relations The UK established diplomatic relations with Vanuatu on 30 July 1980.: Vanuatu does not maintain a high commission in the United Kingdom.; The United Kingdom is accredited to Vanuatu through its high commission in Port Vila.; The UK governed Vanuatu from 1887 until 1980, when Vanuatu achieved full independence. Both countries share common membership of the Commonwealth, the United Nations, the World Health Organization, and the World Trade Organization. Bilaterally, the two countries have signed an Investment Agreement.

=== South America ===
Country	Since	Notes
Argentina	1825	See Argentina–United Kingdom relations Prime Minister Keir Starmer with Argentine President Javier Milei at a G20 summit in Rio de Janeiro, November 2024 The UK established diplomatic relations with Argentina on 2 February 1825.: Argentina maintains an embassy in London.; The United Kingdom is accredited to Argentina through its embassy in Buenos Aires.; Both countries share common membership of the Atlantic Co-operation Pact, the International Criminal Court, the United Nations, the World Health Organization, and the World Trade Organization. Bilaterally, the two countries have a Double Taxation Convention, and an Investment Agreement.
Bolivia	1840	See Bolivia–United Kingdom relations Foreign Secretary David Cameron with Bolivian Vice President David Choquehuanca in London, March 2024 The UK established diplomatic relations with Bolivia on 29 September 1840.: Bolivia maintains an embassy in London.; The United Kingdom is accredited to Bolivia through its embassy in La Paz.; Both countries share common membership of the International Criminal Court, the United Nations, the World Health Organization, and the World Trade Organization. Bilaterally, the two countries have a Double Taxation Convention.
Brazil	1827	See Brazil–United Kingdom relations Prime Minister Keir Starmer with Brazilian President Luiz Inácio Lula da Silva at a G20 summit in Rio de Janeiro, November 2024 The UK established diplomatic relations with Brazil on 17 August 1827.: Brazil maintains an embassy in London.; The United Kingdom is accredited to Brazil through its embassy in Brasília, and consulates in Belo Horizonte, Recife, Rio de Janeiro, and São Paulo.; Both countries share common membership of the Atlantic co-operation pact, the G20, the International Criminal Court, the United Nations, the World Health Organization, and the World Trade Organization.
Chile	1823	See Chile–United Kingdom relations Prime Minister Keir Starmer with Chilean President Gabriel Boric at a G20 summit in Rio de Janeiro, November 2024 The UK established diplomatic relations with Chile on 14 September 1823.: Chile maintains an embassy in London.; The United Kingdom is accredited to Chile through its embassy in Santiago.; Both countries share common membership of CPTPP, the International Criminal Court, OECD, the United Nations, the World Health Organization, and the World Trade Organization. Bilaterally, the two countries have an Association Agreement, and a Double Taxation Convention.
Colombia	1825	See Colombia–United Kingdom relations Prime Minister Theresa May with Colombian President Juan Manuel Santos in Downing Street, November 2016 The UK established diplomatic relations with Colombia on 18 April 1825.: Colombia maintains an embassy in London.; The United Kingdom is accredited to Colombia through its embassy in Bogotá.; Both countries share common membership of the International Criminal Court, the OECD, the United Nations, the World Health Organization, and the World Trade Organization, as well as the Andean Countries–UK Free Trade Agreement. Bilaterally the two countries havea Cultural Agreement, a Double Taxation Agreement, an Investment Agreement, a Partnership for Sustainable Growth, and a Security Agreement.
Ecuador	1853	See Ecuador–United Kingdom relations Foreign Office Minister Jeremy Browne with acting Ecuadorian Foreign Minister Kintto Lucas in Quito, July 2011 The UK established diplomatic relations with Ecuador on 29 January 1853.: Ecuador maintains an embassy in London.; The United Kingdom is accredited to Ecuador through its embassy in Quito.; Both countries share common membership of the International Criminal Court, the United Nations, the World Health Organization, and the World Trade Organization, as well as the Andean Countries–UK Trade Agreement. Bilaterally the two countries have a Double Taxation Agreement.
Falkland Islands	N/A	See British Overseas Territories Foreign Secretary Ed Miliband with Falkland Islands Legislative Assembly member Cheryl Roberts in 10 Downing Street, October 2026 The UK is responsible for the foreign relations of the Falkland Islands as a British Overseas Territory.: The Falkland Islands maintains a representative office in London.; The United Kingdom is accredited to the Falkland Islands through its Governer's Office in Stanley.; The UK has governed the Falkland Islands since 1833. Bilaterally the two countries have a Double Taxation Arrangement, and a Reciprocal Healthcare Agreement.
Guyana	1966	See Guyana–United Kingdom relations Prime Minister Keir Starmer with Guyanese President Irfaan Ali at a Commonwealth summit in Apia, October 2024 The UK established diplomatic relations with Guyana on 26 May 1966.: Guyana maintains a high commission in London.; The United Kingdom is accredited to Guyana through its high commission in Georgetown.; The UK governed Guyana from 1803 to 1966, when Guyana achieved full independence. Both countries share common membership of the Atlantic Co-operation Pact, the Caribbean Development Bank, the Commonwealth, the International Criminal Court, the United Nations, the World Health Organization, and the World Trade Organization, as well as the CARIFORUM–United Kingdom Economic Partnership Agreement. Bilaterally the two countries have a Double Taxation Convention, and an Investment Agreement.
Paraguay	1853	See Paraguay–United Kingdom relations Foreign Secretary David Lammy with Paraguayan Foreign Minister Rubén Ramírez Lezcano in London, July 2025 The UK established diplomatic relations with Paraguay on 4 March 1853.: Paraguay maintains an embassy in London.; The United Kingdom is accredited to Paraguay through its embassy in Asunción.; Both countries share common membership of the International Criminal Court, the United Nations, the World Health Organization, and the World Trade Organization. Bilaterally the two countries have an Investment Agreement.
Peru	1823	See Peru–United Kingdom relations Foreign Secretary David Lammy with Peruvian Foreign Minister Elmer Schialer in London, January 2025 The UK established diplomatic relations with Peru on 10 October 1823.: Peru maintains an embassy in London.; The United Kingdom is accredited to Peru through its embassy in Lima.; Both countries are members of CPTPP, the International Criminal Court, the United Nations, the World Health Organization, and the World Trade Organization, as well as the Andean Countries–UK Free Trade Agreement. Bilaterally the two countries have an Investment Agreement.
Suriname	1976	See Suriname–United Kingdom relations The UK established diplomatic relations with Suriname on 31 March 1976.: Suriname does not maintain an embassy in the UK.; The United Kingdom is not accredited to Suriname through an embassy; the UK develops relations through its high commission in Georgetown, Guyana.; England governed Suriname from 1650 to 1667, when Suriname was ceded to the Netherlands. The UK occupied Suriname from 1799 until 1816. Both countries share common membership of the Atlantic Co-operation Pact, the Caribbean Development Bank, the International Criminal Court, the United Nations, the World Health Organization, and the World Trade Organization, as well as the CARIFORUM–United Kingdom Economic Partnership Agreement.
Uruguay	1833	See United Kingdom–Uruguay relations Prime Minister Boris Johnson with Uruguayan President Luis Lacalle Pou in 10 Downing Street, May 2022 The UK established diplomatic relations with Uruguay on 21 February 1833.: Uruguay maintains an embassy in London.; The United Kingdom is accredited to Uruguay through its embassy in Montevideo.; Both countries share common membership of the Atlantic Co-operation Pact, the International Criminal Court, the United Nations, the World Health Organization, and the World Trade Organization. Bilaterally the two countries have a Double Taxation Convention, and an Investment Agreement.
Venezuela	1834	See United Kingdom–Venezuela relations The UK established diplomatic relations with Venezuela on 29 October 1834.: Venezuela maintains an embassy in London.; The United Kingdom is accredited to Venezuela through its embassy in Caracas.; Both countries share common membership of the International Criminal Court, the United Nations, the World Health Organization, and the World Trade Organization. Bilaterally the two countries have an Investment Agreement.

== Sovereignty disputes ==
Map of territorial claims in Antarctica, including the unclaimed Marie Byrd Land. Argentina Australia Chile France New Zealand Norway United Kingdom

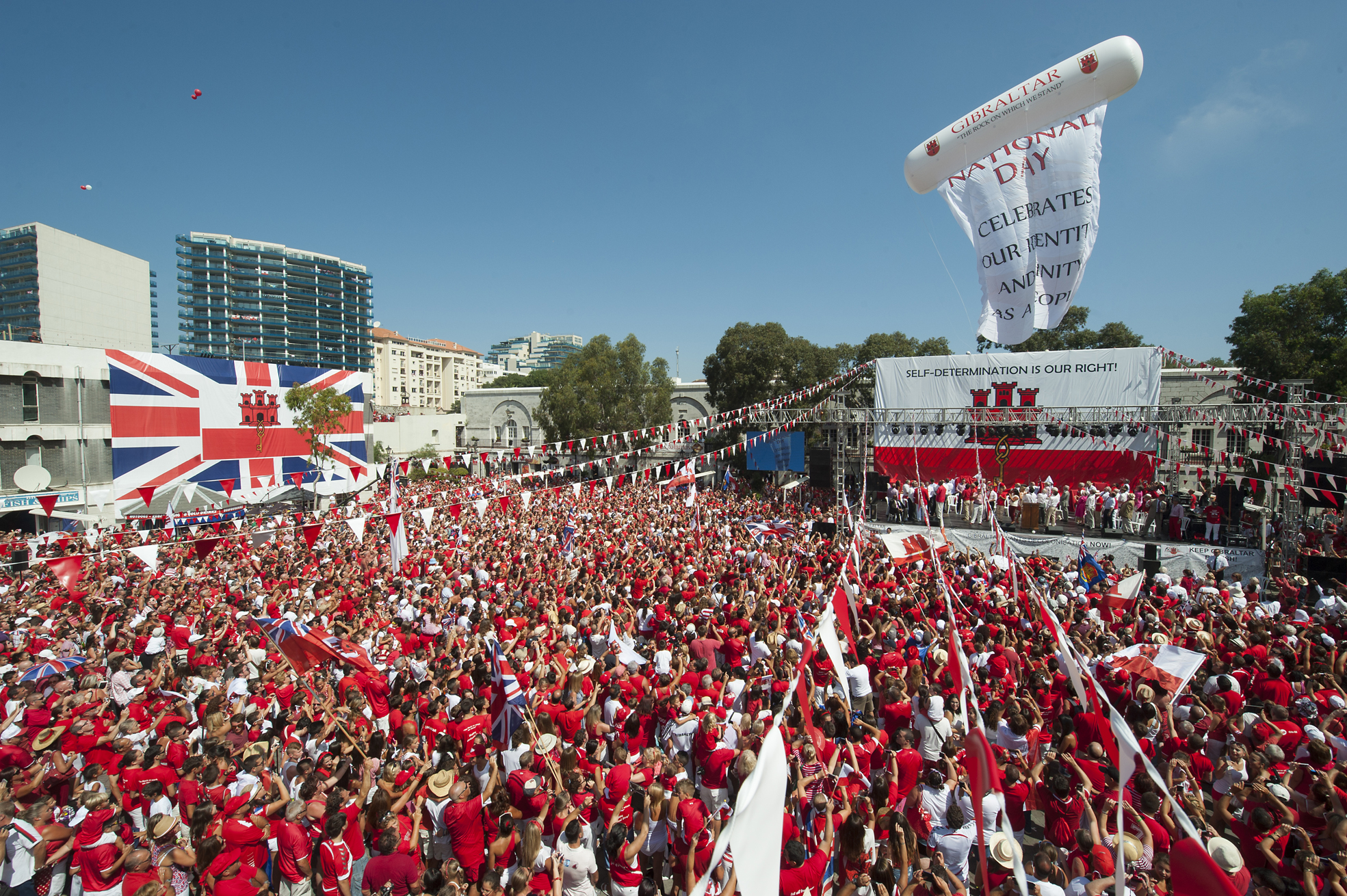
Gibraltar National Day celebrations in 2013

List of territorial disputes involving the United Kingdom:

Territory	Claimants	Notes
Antarctica	United Kingdom • British Antarctic Territory; Argentina • Argentine Antarctica; Chile • Chilean Antarctic Territory	See Territorial claims in Antarctica The United Kingdom claims the area between 20°W and 80°W as a British Overseas Territory. The area between 25°W and 53°W overlaps Argentina's claim. The area between 74°W and 80°W overlaps Chile's claim. The area between 53°W and 74°W overlaps the claims of both Argentina and Chile.
Chagos Archipelago	United Kingdom • British Indian Ocean Territory; Mauritius	See Chagos Archipelago sovereignty dispute The United Kingdom de facto administers the archipelago as the British Indian Ocean Territory. Mauritius claims the islands. On 22 May 2025, Mauritius and the United Kingdom signed a deal to transfer sovereignty to Mauritius; the dispute will end once both parties ratify it.
Rock of Gibraltar	United Kingdom • Gibraltar; Spain	See Status of Gibraltar The United Kingdom de facto governs Gibraltar as a British Overseas Territory. Spain claims Gibraltar, disputing the interpretation of the Treaty of Utrecht, as well as the location of the border. Gibraltarians voted overwhelmingly to remain under British sovereignty in 1967 and 2002.
Falkland Islands	United Kingdom • Falkland Islands; Argentina	See Falkland Islands sovereignty dispute The United Kingdom de facto governs the Falkland Islands as a British Overseas Territory. Argentina claims the Islands as part of its Province of Tierra del Fuego, Antarctica and South Atlantic Islands province. In 1982, the dispute escalated when Argentina invaded the islands during the Falklands War. In 2013, the Falkland Islanders voted overwhelmingly to remain a British Overseas Territory.
Rockall Bank	United Kingdom; Iceland; Ireland; Denmark • Faroe Islands	See Rockall Bank dispute Rockall is an uninhabited islet located within the exclusive economic zone of the UK. Ireland, Denmark, Iceland, and the UK have all submitted to the commission established under the United Nations Convention on the Law of the Sea (UNCLOS).
South Georgia, South Sandwich Islands	United Kingdom • South Georgia and the South Sandwich Islands; Argentina	See South Georgia and the South Sandwich Islands sovereignty dispute The United Kingdom de facto governs South Georgia and the South Sandwich Islands as a British Overseas Territory. Argentina claims the Islands as part of its Province of Tierra del Fuego, Antarctica and South Atlantic Islands province. In 1982, the dispute escalated when Argentina invaded South Georgia during the Falklands War.

== Commonwealth of Nations ==
Members of the Commonwealth of Nations

The UK has varied relationships with the countries that make up the Commonwealth of Nations, which originated from the British Empire. Charles III of the United Kingdom is Head of the Commonwealth and is King of 15 of its 56 member states. Those that retain the King as head of state are called Commonwealth realms. Over time, several countries have been suspended from the Commonwealth for various reasons. Zimbabwe was suspended because of the authoritarian rule of its President.

== International organisations ==
The United Kingdom is a member of the following international organisations:

- ACP - Atlantic Co-operation Pact
- ADB - Asian Development Bank (nonregional member)
- AfDB - African Development Bank (nonregional member)
- Arctic Council (observer)
- Australia Group
- BIS - Bank for International Settlements
- Commonwealth of Nations
- CBSS - Council of the Baltic Sea States (observer)
- CDB - Caribbean Development Bank
- Council of Europe
- CERN - European Organization for Nuclear Research
- CPTPP - Comprehensive and Progressive Agreement for Trans–Pacific Partnership
- EAPC - Euro-Atlantic Partnership Council
- EBRD - European Bank for Reconstruction and Development
- ESA - European Space Agency
- FAO - Food and Agriculture Organization
- FATF - Financial Action Task Force
- G7 - Group of Seven
- G10 - Group of Ten
- G20 - Group of Twenty
- IADB - Inter-American Development Bank
- IAEA - International Atomic Energy Agency
- IBRD - International Bank for Reconstruction and Development (also known as the World Bank)
- ICAO - International Civil Aviation Organization
- ICC - International Chamber of Commerce
- ICCt - International Criminal Court
- ICRM - International Red Cross and Red Crescent Movement
- IDA - International Development Association
- IEA - International Energy Agency
- IFAD - International Fund for Agricultural Development
- IFC - International Finance Corporation
- IFRCS - International Federation of Red Cross and Red Crescent Societies
- IHO - International Hydrographic Organization
- ILO - International Labour Organization
- IMF - International Monetary Fund
- IMO - International Maritime Organization
- IMSO - International Mobile Satellite Organization
- Interpol - International Criminal Police Organization
- IOC - International Olympic Committee
- IOM - International Organization for Migration
- IPU - Inter-Parliamentary Union
- ISO - International Organization for Standardization
- ITSO - International Telecommunications Satellite Organization
- ITU - International Telecommunication Union
- ITUC - International Trade Union Confederation
- MIGA - Multilateral Investment Guarantee Agency
- MONUSCO - United Nations Organization Stabilization Mission in the Democratic Republic of the Congo
- NATO - North Atlantic Treaty Organization
- NEA - Nuclear Energy Agency
- NSG - Nuclear Suppliers Group
- OAS - Organization of American States (observer)
- OECD - Organisation for Economic Co-operation and Development
- OPCW - Organisation for the Prohibition of Chemical Weapons
- OSCE - Organization for Security and Co-operation in Europe
- Paris Club
- PCA - Permanent Court of Arbitration
- PIF - Pacific Islands Forum (partner)
- SECI - Southeast European Cooperative Initiative (observer)
- UN - United Nations
- UNSC - United Nations Security Council
- UNCTAD - United Nations Conference on Trade and Development
- UNESCO - United Nations Educational, Scientific and Cultural Organization
- UNFICYP - United Nations Peacekeeping Force in Cyprus
- UNHCR - United Nations High Commissioner for Refugees
- UNMIS - United Nations Mission in Sudan
- UNRWA - United Nations Relief and Works Agency for Palestine Refugees in the Near East
- UPU - Universal Postal Union
- WCO - World Customs Organization
- WHO - World Health Organization
- WIPO - World Intellectual Property Organization
- WMO - World Meteorological Organization
- WTO - World Trade Organization
- Zangger Committee - (also known as the Nuclear Exporters Committee)

== See also ==
- Timeline of British diplomatic history
- Timeline of European imperialism
- Anglophobia
- British diaspora
- History of the United Kingdom
- Soft power of the United Kingdom
- Foreign, Commonwealth and Development Office
- Heads of United Kingdom Missions
- List of diplomatic missions of the United Kingdom
- European Union–United Kingdom relations
- Latin America–United Kingdom relations
- Accession of the United Kingdom to CPTPP
- Free trade agreements of the United Kingdom
- United Kingdom–Crown Dependencies Customs Union
- International relations of Countries of the United Kingdom
  - International relations of England
    - International relations of the Greater London Authority
  - International relations of Northern Ireland
  - International relations of Scotland
  - International relations of Wales
  - Membership of the countries of the United Kingdom in international organisations
- 2025 UK refugee plan

== Bibliography ==
- Casey, Terrence. The Blair Legacy: Politics, Policy, Governance, and Foreign Affairs (2009) excerpt and text search
- Daddow, Oliver, and Jamie Gaskarth, eds. British foreign policy: the New Labour years (Palgrave, 2011)
- Daddow, Oliver. "Constructing a ‘great’ role for Britain in an age of austerity: Interpreting coalition foreign policy, 2010–2015." International Relations 29.3 (2015): 303-318.
- Dickie, John. The New Mandarins: How British Foreign Policy Works (2004)
- Dumbrell, John. A special relationship: Anglo-American relations from the Cold War to Iraq (2006)
- Finlan, Alastair. Contemporary Military Strategy and the Global War on Terror: US and UK Armed Forces in Afghanistan and Iraq 2001-2012 (2014)
- Gallagher, Julia. "Healing the scar? Idealizing Britain in Africa, 1997–2007." African Affairs 108.432 (2009): 435-451 online
- Honeyman, V. C. "From Liberal Interventionism to Liberal Conservatism: the short road in foreign policy from Blair to Cameron." British Politics (2015). abstract
- Lane, Ann. Strategy, Diplomacy and UK Foreign Policy (Palgrave Macmillan, 2010)
- Leech, Philip, and Jamie Gaskarth. "British Foreign Policy and the Arab Spring." Diplomacy & Statecraft 26#1 (2015).
- Lunn, Jon, Vaughne Miller, Ben Smith. "British foreign policy since 1997 - Commons Library Research Paper RP08/56" (UK House of Commons, 2008) 123pp online
- Magyarics, Tamas. Balancing in Central Europe: Great Britain and Hungary in the 1920s
- Seah, Daniel. "The CFSP as an aspect of conducting foreign relations by the United Kingdom: With Special Reference to the Treaty of Amity & Cooperation in Southeast Asia" International Review of Law (2015) "online
- Seton-Watson, R. W. Britain in Europe (1789–1914): A Survey of Foreign Policy (1937) online
- Stephens, Philip. Britain Alone: The Path from Suez to Brexit (2021) excerpted
- Whitman, Richard G. "The calm after the storm? Foreign and security policy from Blair to Brown." Parliamentary Affairs 63.4 (2010): 834–848. online
- Williams, Paul. British Foreign Policy under New Labour (2005)

=== Primary sources ===
- Blair, Tony. A Journey: My Political Life (2010)
- Howe, Geoffrey. Conflict of Loyalty (1994), a memoir that covers 1983 to 1989 online
