= Ministry of Foreign Affairs and International Cooperation (Eswatini) =

Government ministry of Eswatini

- Coat of Arms of Eswatini

Agency overview
- Jurisdiction: Eswatini and its diplomatic missions worldwide
- Headquarters: Mhlambanyatsi Road, P.O. Box 518 Mbabane
- Agency executives: Pholile Shakantu, Minister; Melusi Masuku, Principal Secretary
- Website: www.gov.sz

The Ministry of Foreign Affairs and International Cooperation is a cabinet ministry of Eswatini in charge of conducting and designing the foreign relations of the country.

== List of ministers ==
This is a list of ministers of foreign affairs and international cooperation of Eswatini:

- 1968–1970: Prince Makhosini Dlamini
- 1970–1971: Zonke Amos Khumalo
- 1971–1972: Kanyakwezwe Henry Dlamini
- 1972–1979: Mhlangano Stephen Matsebula
- 1979–1982: Lawrence Macina
- 1982–1984: Richard Velaphi Dlamini
- 1984–1986: Mhambi Mnisi
- 1986–1987: Shadrack J.S. Sibanyoni
- 1987–1993: Sir George Mbikwakhe Mamba
- 1993–1995: Solomon Dlamini
- 1995–1998: Arthur Khoza
- 1998–2001: Albert Nhlanhla Shabangu
- 2001–2003: Abednego Ntshangase
- 2003 : Roy Fanourakis
- 2003–2006: Mabili Dlamini
- 2006–2008: Moses Mathendele Dlamini
- 2008–2011: Lutfo Dlamini
- 2011–2013: Mtiti Fakudze
- 2013 : Sotsha Dlamini (acting)
- 2013–2018: Mgwagwa Gamedze
- 2018 : Joel Musa Nhleko (acting)
- 2018–2023: Thuli Dladla
- 2023–present: Pholile Shakantu

== See also ==
- List of diplomatic missions of Eswatini
- List of diplomatic missions in Eswatini
