= Eswatini–Taiwan relations =

- Eswatini: Taiwan

Diplomatic mission
- Embassy of Eswatini to Taiwan: Embassy of Taiwan to Eswatini

Envoy
- Ambassador Promise Sithembiso Msibi: Ambassador Jeremy H.S. Liang

Eswatini–Taiwan relations refer to the international relations between the Eswatini (officially the Kingdom of Eswatini) and Taiwan (officially the Republic of China). Eswatini maintains an embassy in Taipei, and Taiwan maintains an embassy in Mbabane.

== History ==
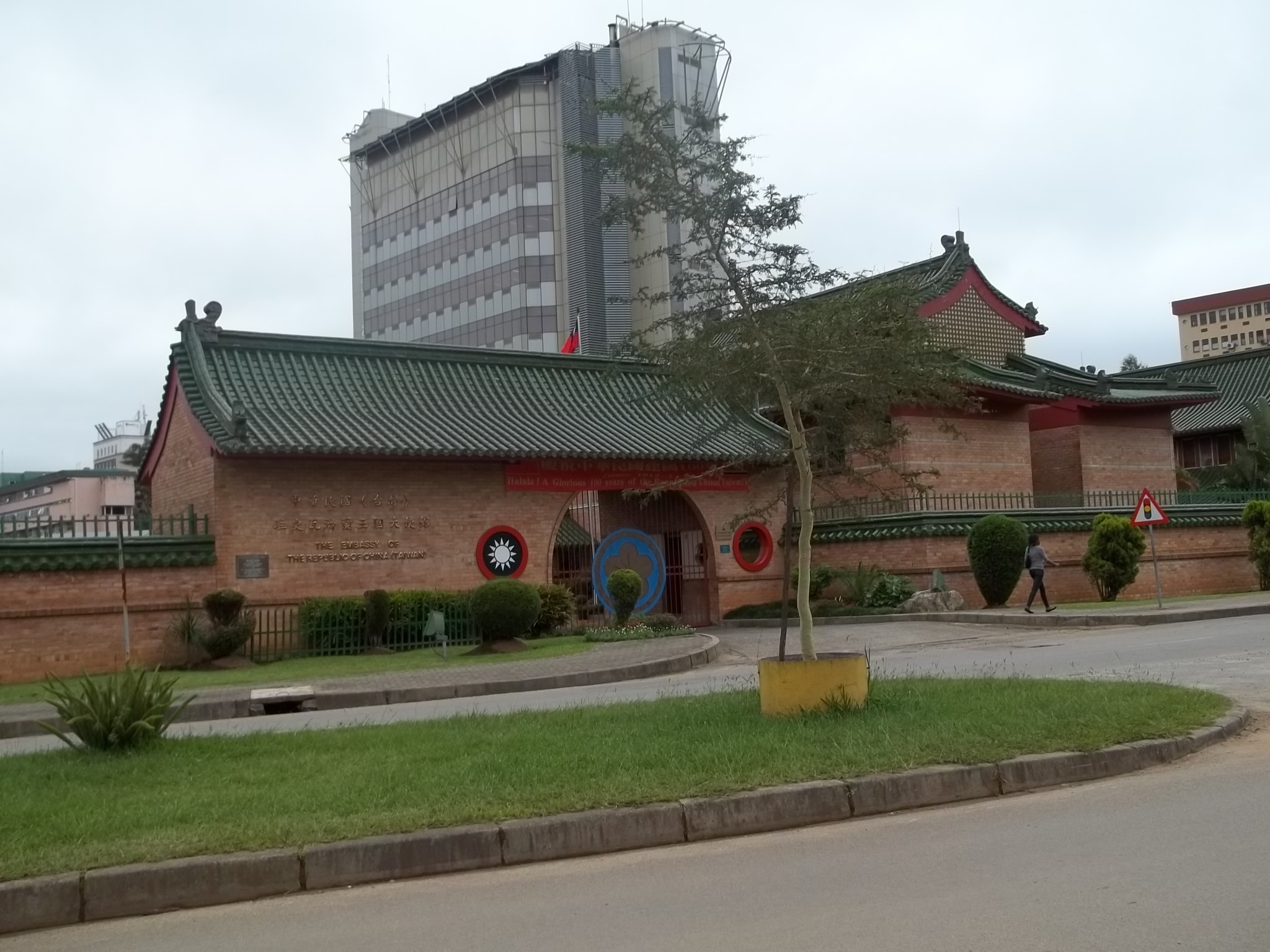
Embassy of Taiwan in Mbabane

Eswatini recognized the Republic of China (ROC) over the People's Republic of China (PRC) on 16 September 1968, and have since maintained formal diplomatic relations with the ROC.

Eswatini is one of 12 nations that officially recognizes Taiwan. In May 2018, Burkina Faso switched to recognize the People's Republic of China, thus ending diplomatic ties with Taiwan, making Eswatini the last African country to recognize the ROC instead of the PRC.

On the 2018 summit of Forum on China–Africa Cooperation in Beijing, China declared “we hope that by the time the China-Africa cooperation forum Beijing summit happens, we can have a happy picture of the whole family”, i.e. it hopes to establish diplomatic relations with Swaziland before the summit begins. The government of Eswatini has rejected these overtures from the People's Republic of China. In response, China has turned up the visa restrictions on Swazis to force Eswatini to establish diplomatic links with itself. Declaring "No diplomatic relations, no business benefits." In response to the Chinese pressure on Eswatini, Ou Jiang'an, the director of the Foreign Ministry Information Department of Taiwan said "The ugly nature of the Chinese regime and its despicable means of suppression are contemptible, and it should be deterred by international public opinion."

The Economist claimed in 2021 that Eswatini's relations with Taiwan are second in importance only to those with South Africa.

== Bilateral visits ==
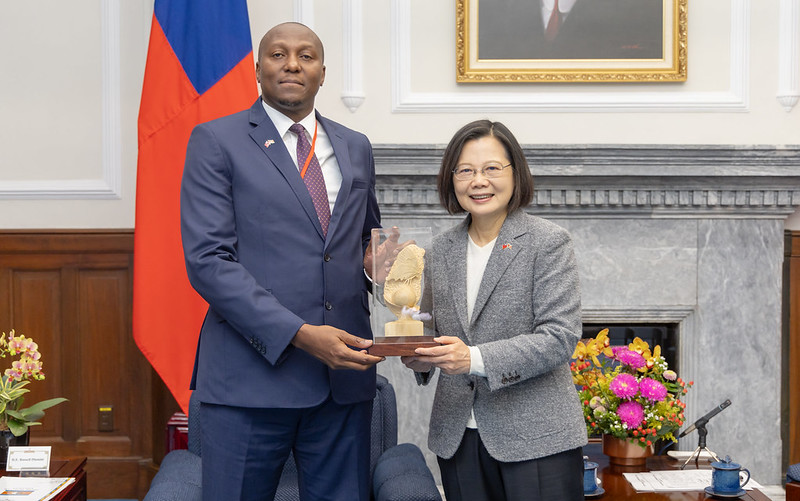
President Tsai Ing-wen meeting Prime Minister Russell Dlamini

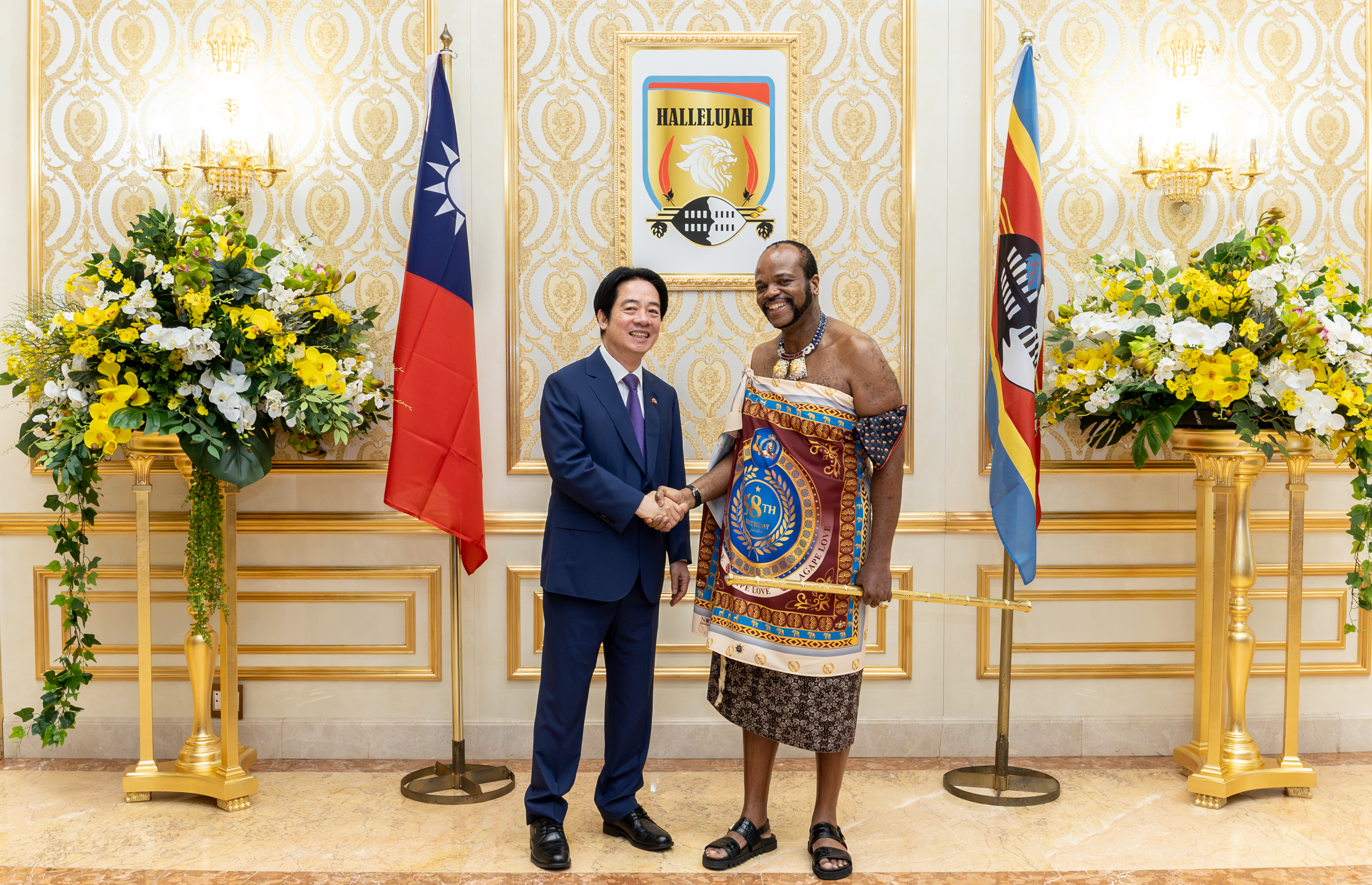
President Lai Ching-te and King Mswati III in May 2026

In June 2018, King of Eswatini, Mswati III, made his 17th visit to Taiwan, after Taiwan President Tsai Ing-wen visited Eswatini in April.

In April 2026, Taiwan President Lai Ching-te suspended his planned trip to Eswatini after China pressured Seychelles, Mauritius, and Madagascar to revoke overflight permissions for his chartered plane. Additionally, the Czech and German governments denied requests for Taiwan to let President Lai to fly through Czech and German airspace en route to Eswatini. Despite China's pressures, Taiwan's Minister of Foreign Affairs Lin Chia-lung arrived in Eswatini 5 days later, saying Taiwan would not be held back by "authoritarian forces". Following this incident, Eswatini Deputy Prime Minister Thuli Dladla swiftly visited Taiwan on 30 April. President Lai was quoted by the Presidential Office saying "the friendship between Taiwan and Eswatini cannot be shaken by Chinese pressure, as the two nations do not bow to hegemons".

On 2 May 2026, President Lai Ching-te travelled to Eswatini. This act angered China, who described the visit as a "stowaway-style escape farce" and condemned Lai as a "rat".

== Economic relations ==
In 2024, Eswatini exported US$171,000 to Taiwan and Taiwan exported US$7.88 million to Eswatini. The main products that Eswatini exports to Taiwan are frozen beef, raw sugar and processed fruits and nuts; the main products that Taiwan exports to Eswatini are rice, paper machines and textile footwear.

From 2019 to 2024, exports from Eswatini to Taiwan decreased at an annualized rate of 25.3%, from US$735,000 in 2019 to US$171,000 in 2024. Exports from Taiwan to Eswatini decreased at an annualized rate of 14%, from US$16.8 million in 2019 to US$7.88 million in 2024.

Taiwan has been constructing a large industrial park and strategic oil reserve in Eswatini, named the Taiwan Innovation Park. Outside of the Taiwan Innovation Park, Taiwanese firms in 2025 provided 13,000 jobs for Eswatini.

== Taiwanese aid ==
Taiwan has provided economic aid to Eswatini, funding a rural electrification scheme and university scholarships. Over 25 years it is estimated that aid is about two billion dollars.

In September 2021, Taiwan announced it would be providing US$22.9 million in aid to repair schools, hospitals and other infrastructure that were damaged during the civil unrest.

== See also ==
- Foreign relations of Eswatini
- Foreign relations of Taiwan
