= Eswatini–United Kingdom relations =

- Eswatini: United Kingdom

Diplomatic mission
- High Commission of Eswatini, London: High Commission of the United Kingdom, Mbabane

Eswatini–United Kingdom relations are the current and historical relationships between the United Kingdom of Great Britain and Northern Ireland (UK) and the Kingdom of Eswatini.

Both countries share common membership of the Commonwealth and the World Trade Organization, as well as the Southern Africa Customs Union and Mozambique–United Kingdom Economic Partnership Agreement. Bilaterally the two countries have a Double Tax Convention, an Investment Agreement.

== History ==
The UK governed Eswatini from 1903 to 1968, when it achieved full independence.

== Economic relations ==
From 10 October 2016 until 30 December 2020, trade between Eswatini and the UK was governed by the Southern African Customs Union–European Union Economic Partnership Agreement, while the United Kingdom was a member of the European Union. Following the withdrawal of the United Kingdom from the European Union, the UK and the 'Southern Africa Customs Union and Mozambique', a trade bloc of which Eswatini is a member, signed a continuity trade agreement on 9 October 2019, based on the EU free trade agreement; the agreement entered into force on 1 January 2021. Trade value between the 'Southern Africa Customs Union and Mozambique' and the United Kingdom was worth £12,539 million in 2022.

== Diplomatic missions ==
As Commonwealth nations Eswatini and the United Kingdom are accredited to each other through high commissions.

- Eswatini maintains a high commission in London.
- The United Kingdom is accredited to Eswatini through its high commission in Mbabane.

== See also ==
- Foreign relations of Eswatini
- Foreign relations of the United Kingdom
- Southern Africa Customs Union and Mozambique–United Kingdom Economic Partnership Agreement
