= List of diplomatic missions of Eswatini =

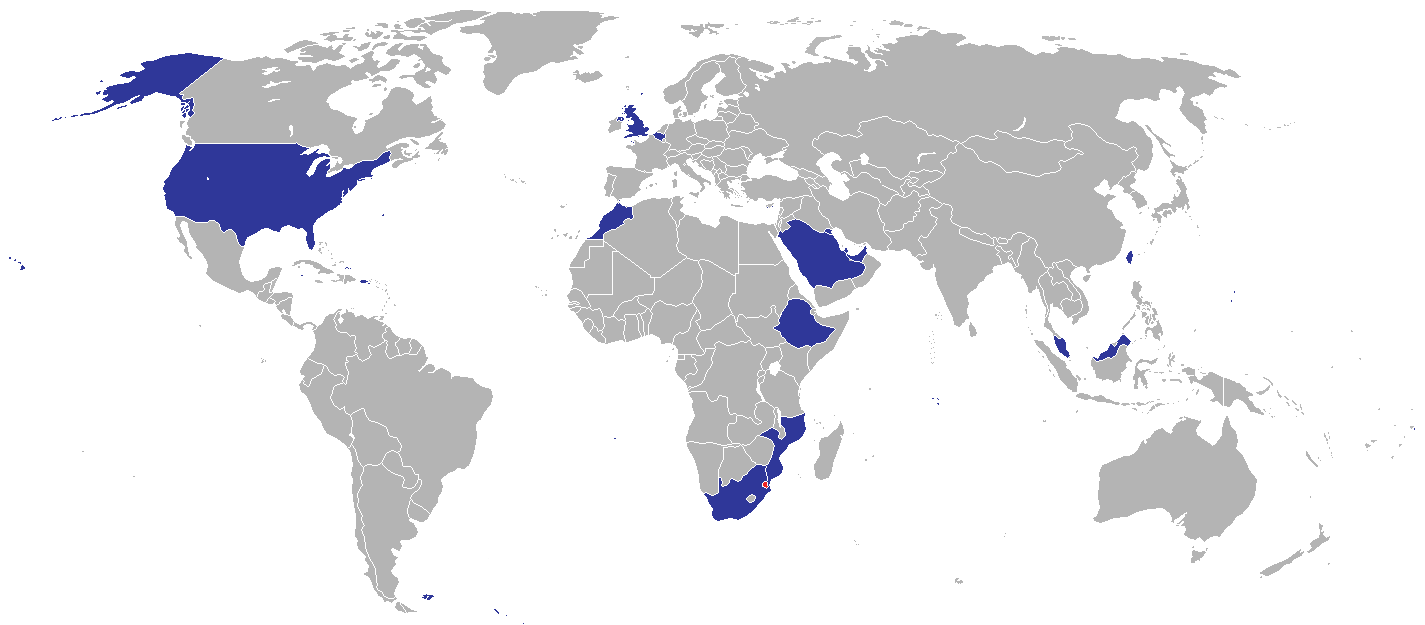
Map of Eswati diplomatic missions

The Kingdom of Eswatini has a small population and maintains a small number of diplomatic missions. Notably, it is also the last remaining African country that maintains diplomatic relations with Taiwan, and as such has a resident embassy in Taipei.

Honorary consulates are excluded from this listing.

== Current missions ==
=== Africa ===
Host country	Host city	Mission	Concurrent accreditation	Ref.
Ethiopia	Addis Ababa	Embassy	Countries: Algeria; Israel; Kenya; Libya; South Sudan; Tanzania; Uganda; International Organizations: African Union; United Nations Economic Commission for Africa; United Nations Environment Programme; United Nations Human Settlements Programme	
Morocco	Rabat	Embassy	Countries: Benin; Burkina Faso; Cape Verde; Chad; Egypt; Ghana; Guinea; Ivory Coast; Liberia; Mali; Mauritania; Niger; Sierra Leone; Sudan; Togo; Tunisia	
Morocco	Laayoune	Consulate-General	Countries: Benin; Burkina Faso; Cape Verde; Chad; Egypt; Ghana; Guinea; Ivory Coast; Liberia; Mali; Mauritania; Niger; Sierra Leone; Sudan; Togo; Tunisia	
Mozambique	Maputo	High Commission	Countries: Angola; Congo-Kinshasa; Malawi; Mauritius; Rwanda; Seychelles	
South Africa	Pretoria	High Commission	Countries: Botswana; Lesotho; Namibia; Zambia; Zimbabwe; International Organizations: Common Market for Eastern and Southern Africa; Southern African Customs Union; Southern African Development Community	
South Africa	Johannesburg	Consulate-General	Countries: Botswana; Lesotho; Namibia; Zambia; Zimbabwe; International Organizations: Common Market for Eastern and Southern Africa; Southern African Customs Union; Southern African Development Community	

=== America ===
Host country	Host city	Mission	Concurrent accreditation	Ref.
United States	Washington, D.C.	Embassy	Countries: Argentina; Brazil; Canada; Chile; Venezuela	

=== Asia ===
Host country	Host city	Mission	Concurrent accreditation	Ref.
India	New Delhi	High Commission		
Kuwait	Kuwait City	Embassy		
Malaysia	Kuala Lumpur	High Commission	Countries: Australia; Bangladesh; Brunei; Indonesia; Japan; New Zealand; Pakistan; Philippines; South Korea; Sri Lanka; Thailand; Tonga	
Qatar	Doha	Embassy		
Saudi Arabia	Riyadh	Embassy		
Republic of China (Taiwan)	Taipei	Embassy		
United Arab Emirates	Abu Dhabi	Embassy		

=== Europe ===
Host country	Host city	Mission	Concurrent accreditation	Ref.
Belgium	Brussels	Embassy	Countries: Estonia; Germany; Holy See; Luxembourg; Netherlands; Poland; Serbia; International Organization: European Union; Organisation of African, Caribbean and Pacific States	
United Kingdom	London	High Commission	Countries: Bulgaria; Cyprus; Denmark; Finland; Greece; Iceland; Ireland; Italy; Malta; Norway; Portugal; Romania; Spain; Sweden; International Organizations: Commonwealth of Nations; International Sugar Organization	

=== Multilateral organisations ===
Organization	Host city	Host country	Mission	Concurrent accreditation	Ref.
United Nations	New York City	United States	Permanent Mission	Countries: Bahamas; Barbados; Croatia; Cuba; Guyana; Jamaica; Latvia; Mexico; Mongolia; Nepal; Tajikistan; Trinidad and Tobago	
United Nations	Geneva	Switzerland	Permanent Mission	Countries: Austria; Hungary; Russia; Switzerland; Ukraine; International Organizations: Food and Agriculture Organization; International Fund for Agricultural Development; International Atomic Energy Agency; International Labour Organization; International Organization for Migration; UNESCO; United Nations Industrial Development Organization; World Food Programme; World Health Organization; World Trade Organization	

== Gallery ==
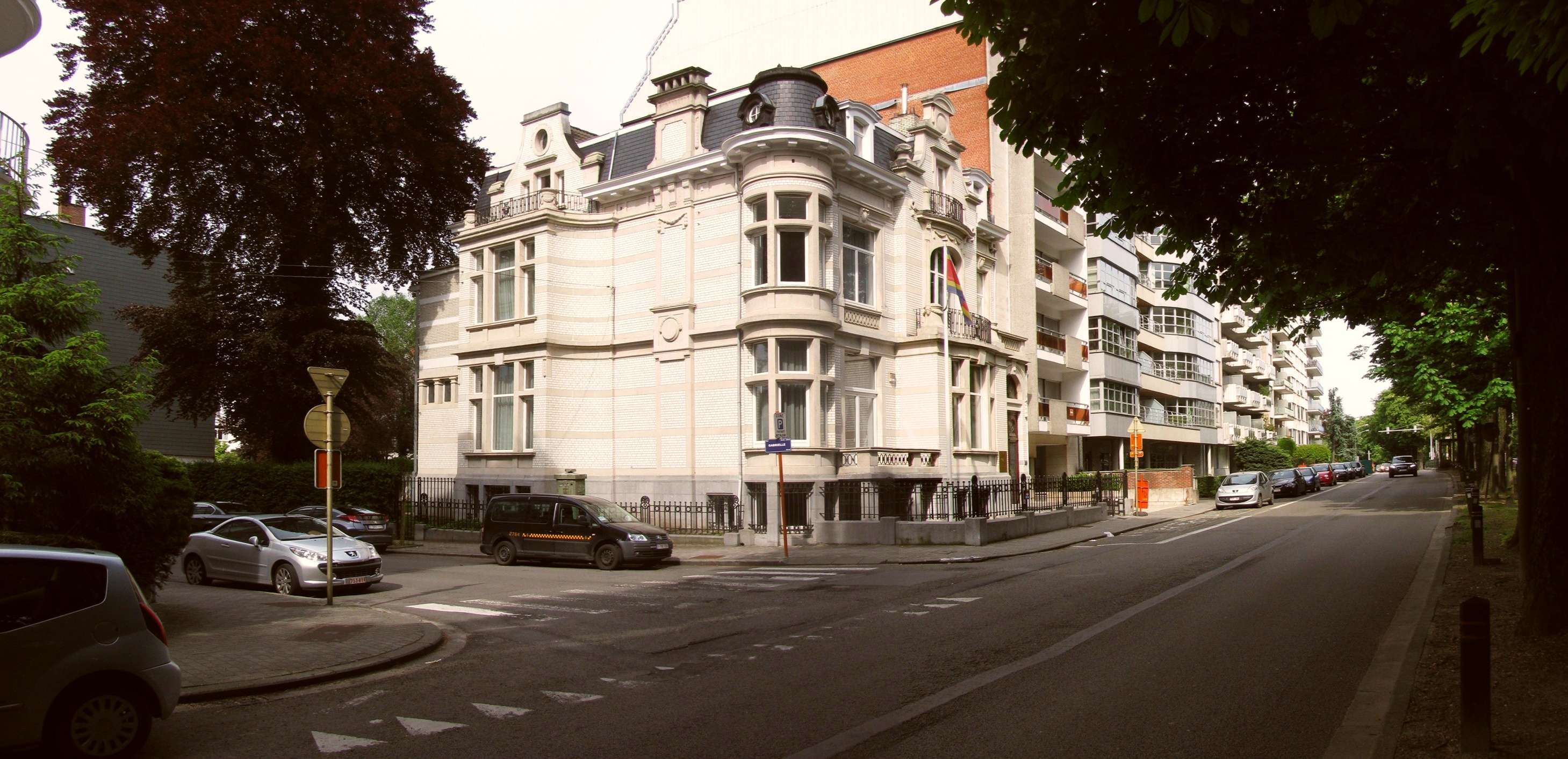
Embassy in Brussels

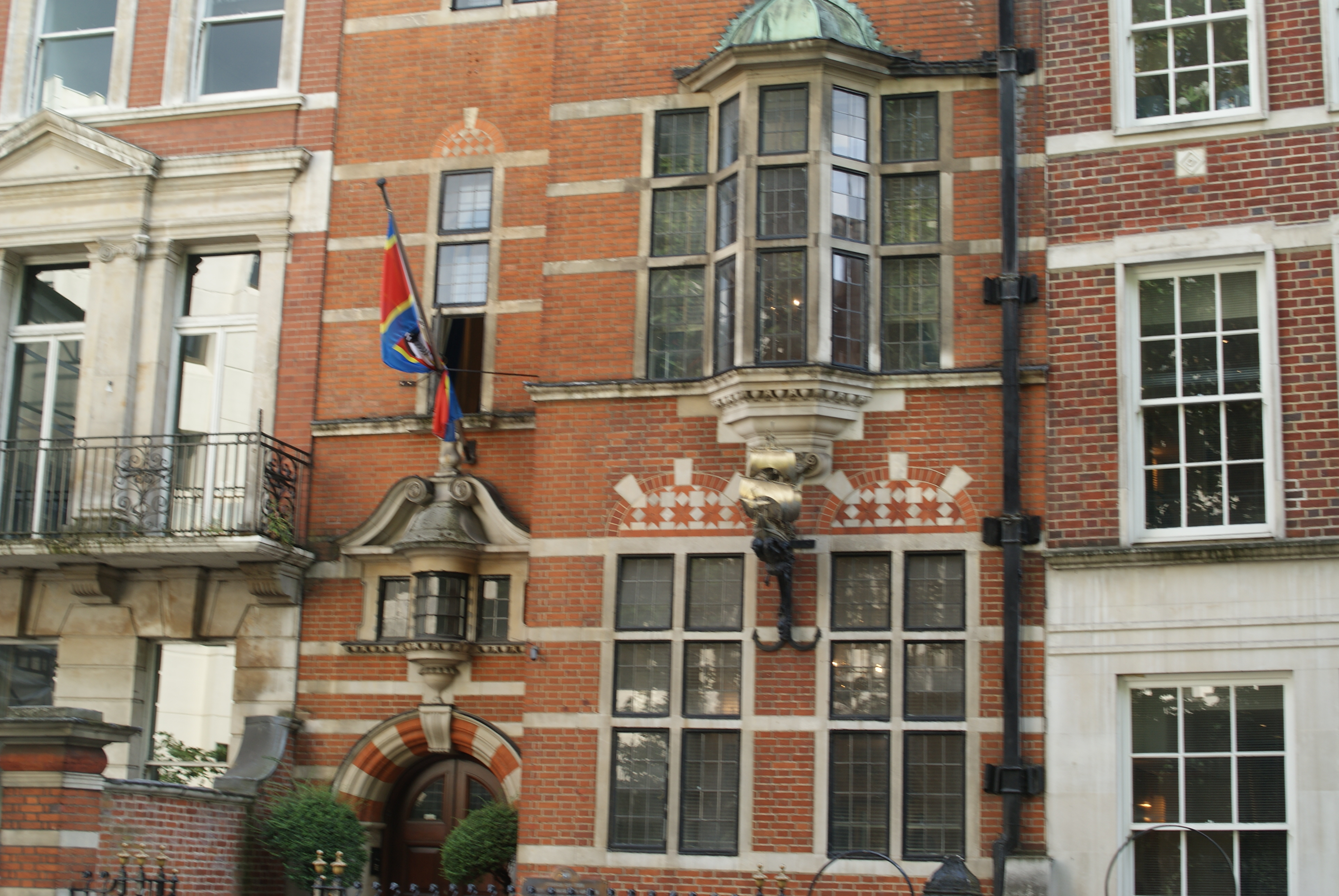
High Commission in London

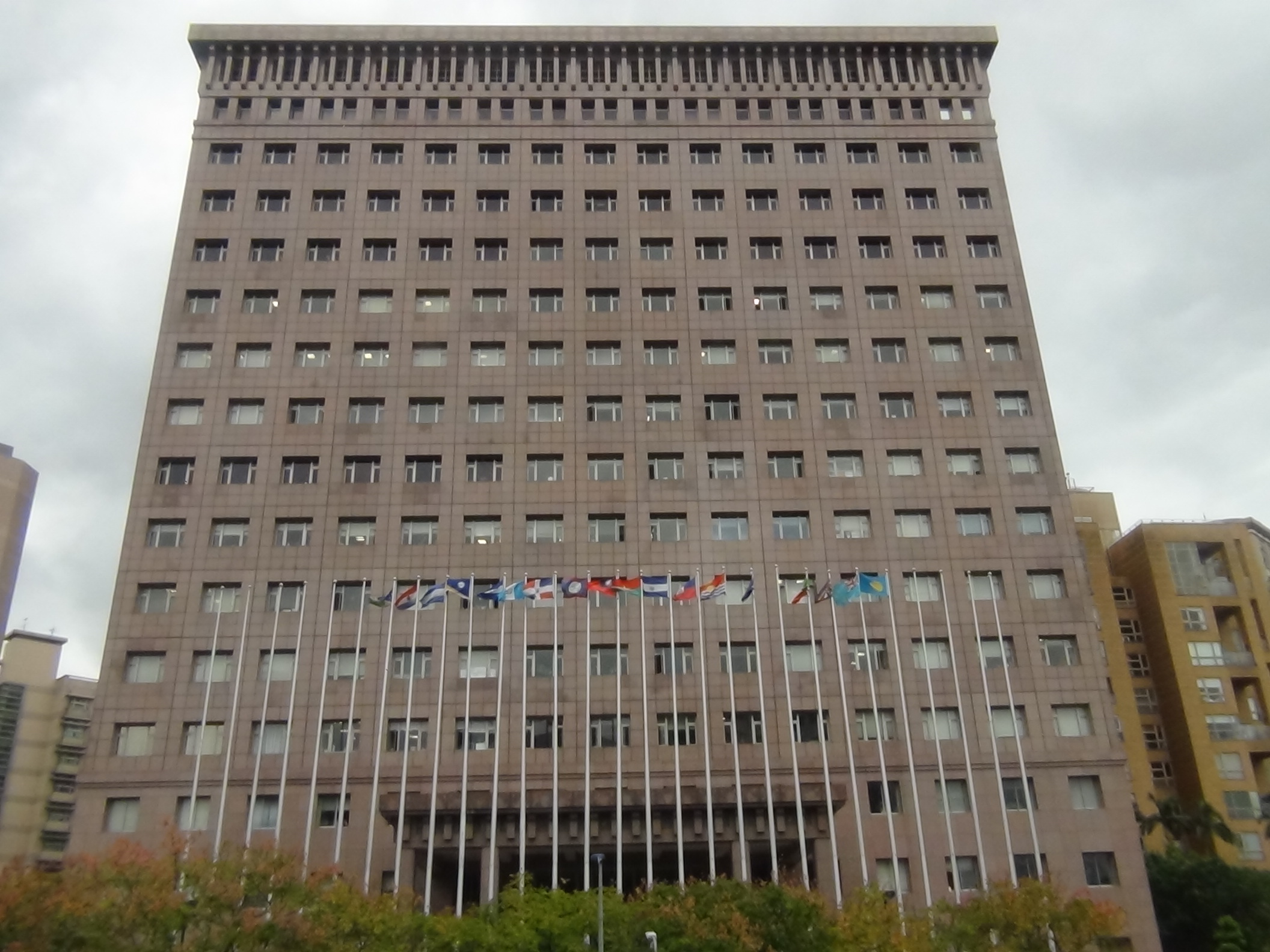
Building hosting the embassy in Taipei

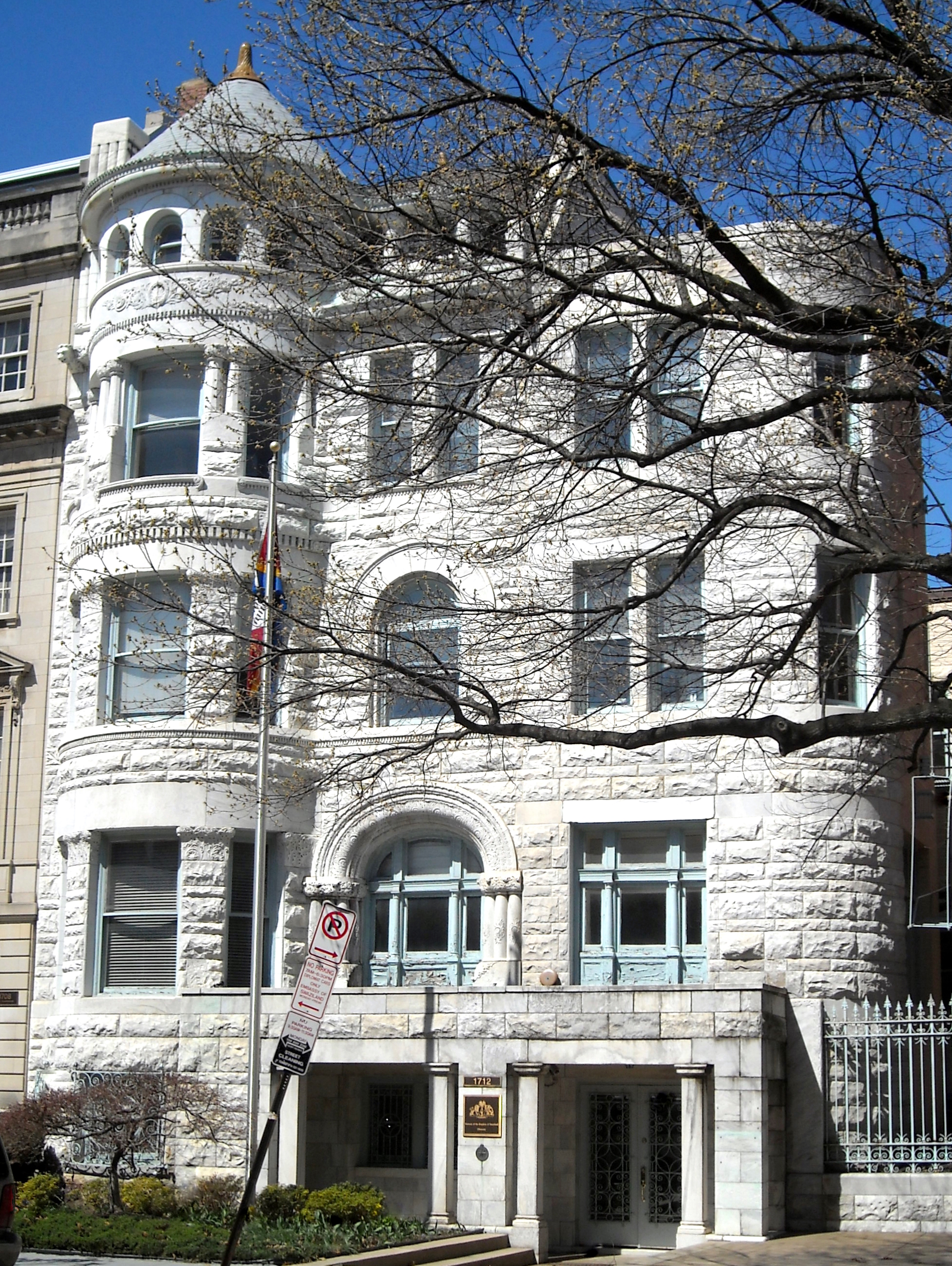
Embassy in Washington, D.C.

== Closed missions ==
=== Africa ===
Host country	Host city	Mission	Year closed	Ref.
Kenya	Nairobi	High Commission	2004	

=== Americas ===
Host country	Host city	Mission	Year closed	Ref.
Canada	Ottawa	High Commission	1999	

== See also ==
- Foreign relations of Eswatini
- List of diplomatic missions in Eswatini
- Visa policy of Eswatini
