= Botswana–United Kingdom relations =

- United Kingdom: Botswana

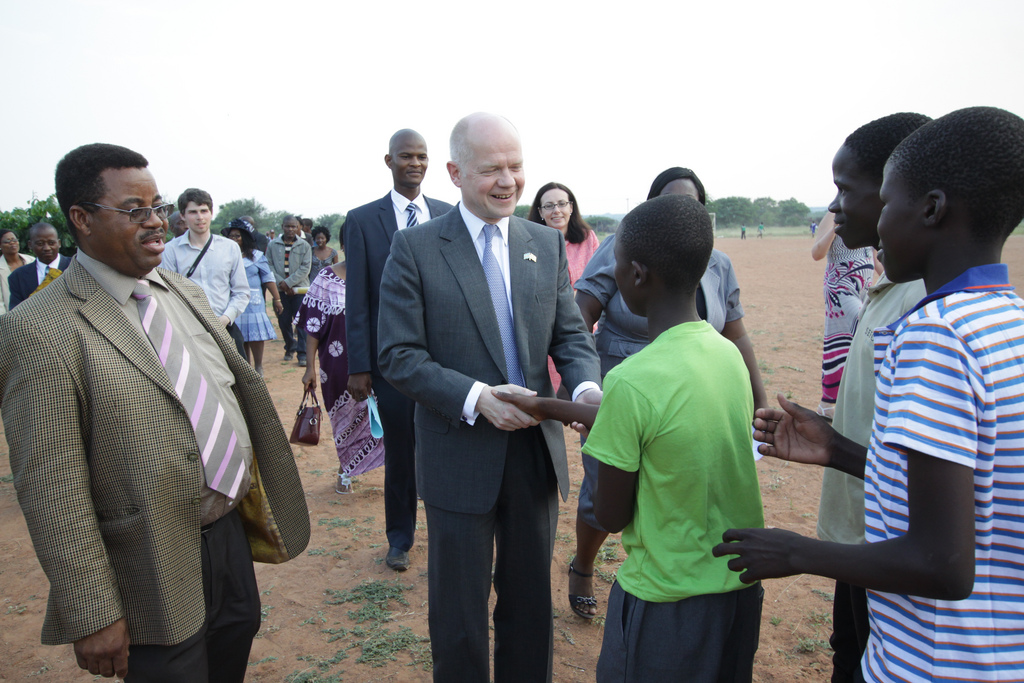
Foreign Secretary William Hague in Botswana, February 2012.

Botswana–United Kingdom relations are the current and historical relationships between the United Kingdom (UK) and the Republic of Botswana. The two nations established diplomatic ties upon Botswana's independence.

Both countries share common membership of the Commonwealth, the International Criminal Court, and the World Trade Organization, as well as the Southern Africa Customs Union and Mozambique–United Kingdom Economic Partnership Agreement. Bilaterally the two countries have a Double Tax Convention.

== Economic relations ==
From 10 October 2016 until 30 December 2020, trade between Botswana and the UK was governed by the European Union–Southern Africa Customs Union Economic Partnership Agreement, while the United Kingdom was a member of the European Union.

Following the withdrawal of the United Kingdom from the European Union, Botswana and the UK signed the Southern Africa Customs Union and Mozambique–United Kingdom Economic Partnership Agreement on 9 October 2019. The SACUM–United Kingdom Economic Partnership Agreement is a continuity trade agreement, based on the EU free trade agreement, which entered into force on 1 January 2021. Trade value between the 'Southern Africa Customs Union and Mozambique' and the United Kingdom was worth £12,539 million in 2022.

== Resident diplomatic missions ==
- Botswana maintains a high commission in London.
- The United Kingdom is accredited to Botswana through its high commission in Gaborone.

== See also ==
- Bechuanaland Protectorate
- Foreign relations of Botswana
- Foreign relations of the United Kingdom
- History of Botswana
- South Africa–United Kingdom relations
- Southern Africa Customs Union and Mozambique–United Kingdom Economic Partnership Agreement
