= List of ambassadors of the Republic of China to Eswatini =

Taiwanese embassy in Eswatini

Coordinates: 26.326558°S 31.146416°E

Taiwanese Ambassador to Eswatini
- Incumbent; Thomas J. C. Chen since 28 October 2013
- Inaugural holder: Che Yin-shou
- Formation: 1 December 1973; 52 years ago

The Taiwanese Ambassador to Eswatini is the official representative of the Republic of China to the Kingdom of Eswatini.

== List of representatives ==
Start date	Ambassador	Notes	Premier of the Republic of China	Monarch of Swaziland	End date
September 6, 1968		The Kingdom of Swaziland was briefly a Protected State until Britain granted it independence in 1968, when the governments in Mbane and Taipei established diplomatic relations.	Yen Chia-kan	Sobhuza II	
October 1, 1968	Lo Ming-Yuan	The government of Taiwan appointed the Consul General in Johannesburg, Lo Ming-Yuan, as ambassador to Swaziland. In October 1970, he presented his credentials.	Yen Chia-kan	Sobhuza II	
November 21, 1968		The Government of the Republic of China set up the Embassy of the Republic of China (Taiwan) in the Kingdom of Swaziland.	Yen Chia-kan	Sobhuza II	
October 25, 1971		The government of Swaziland supported the Republic of China's "China" seat in the United Nations at the United Nations General Assembly.	Yen Chia-kan	Sobhuza II	
January 31, 1973	Johnson Cheng	The Executive Yuan approved the appointment of Che Yin-shou, a veteran diplomat, as ambassador to Swaziland to succeed Johnson Cheng, who was killed in an auto accident.	Chiang Ching-kuo	Mswati III	October 10, 1973
December 1, 1973	Che Yin-shou		Chiang Ching-kuo	Mswati III	
May 1, 1980	Chou Tung-hua		Sun Yun-suan	Mswati III	
June 23, 1985	Stephen F. Wang		Yu Kuo-hwa	Mswati III	
October 28, 2013	Thomas J. C. Chen	Director-general of the Bureau of Consular Affairs under the Ministry of Foreign Affairs	Jiang Yi-hua	Mswati III	
