= Eswatini–United States relations =

- Eswatini: United States

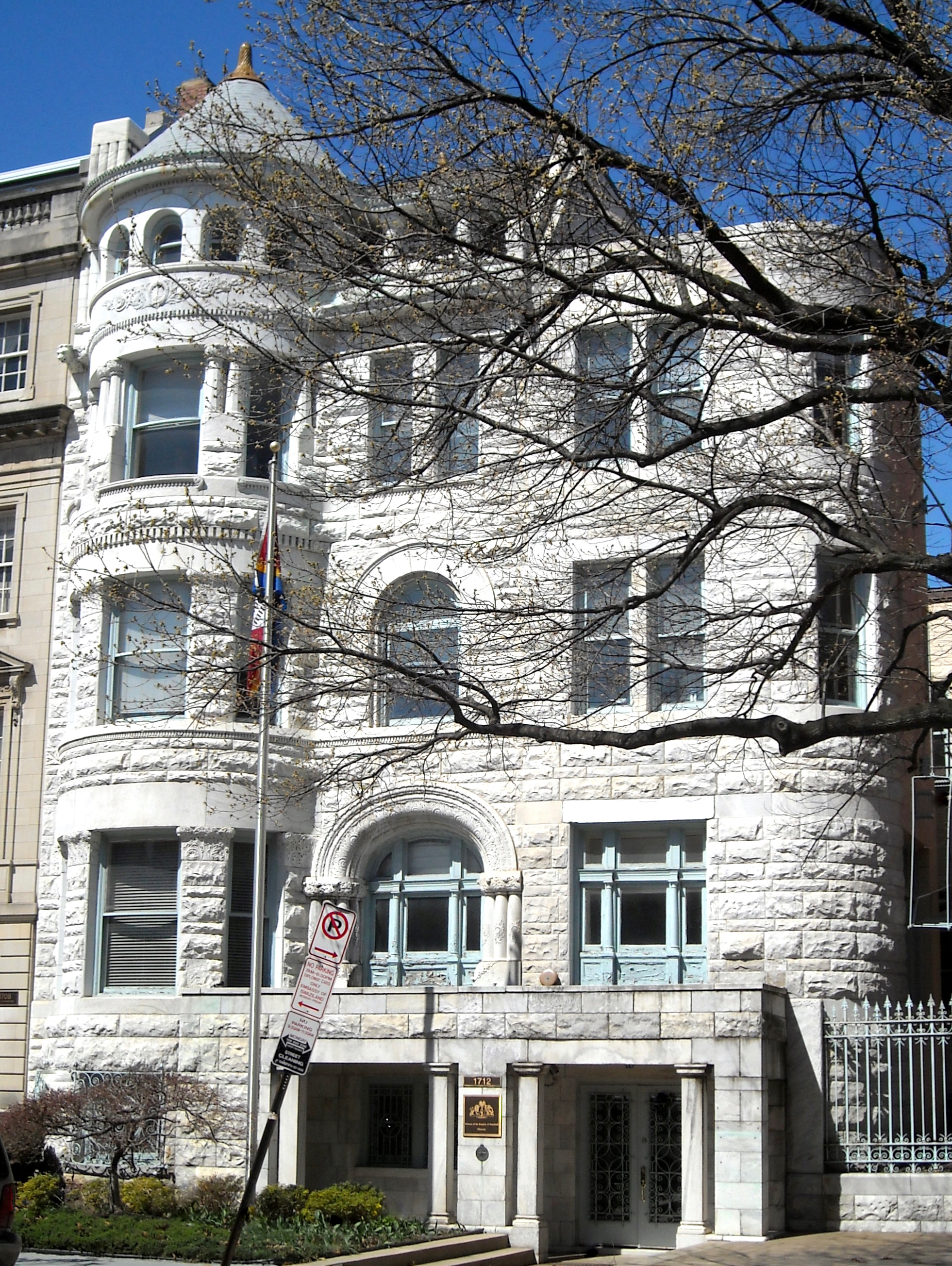
Embassy of Eswatini in Washington, D.C.

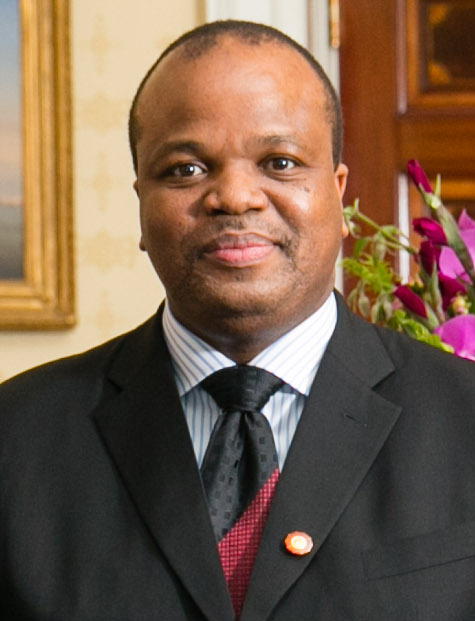
Mswati III, current King of Eswatini

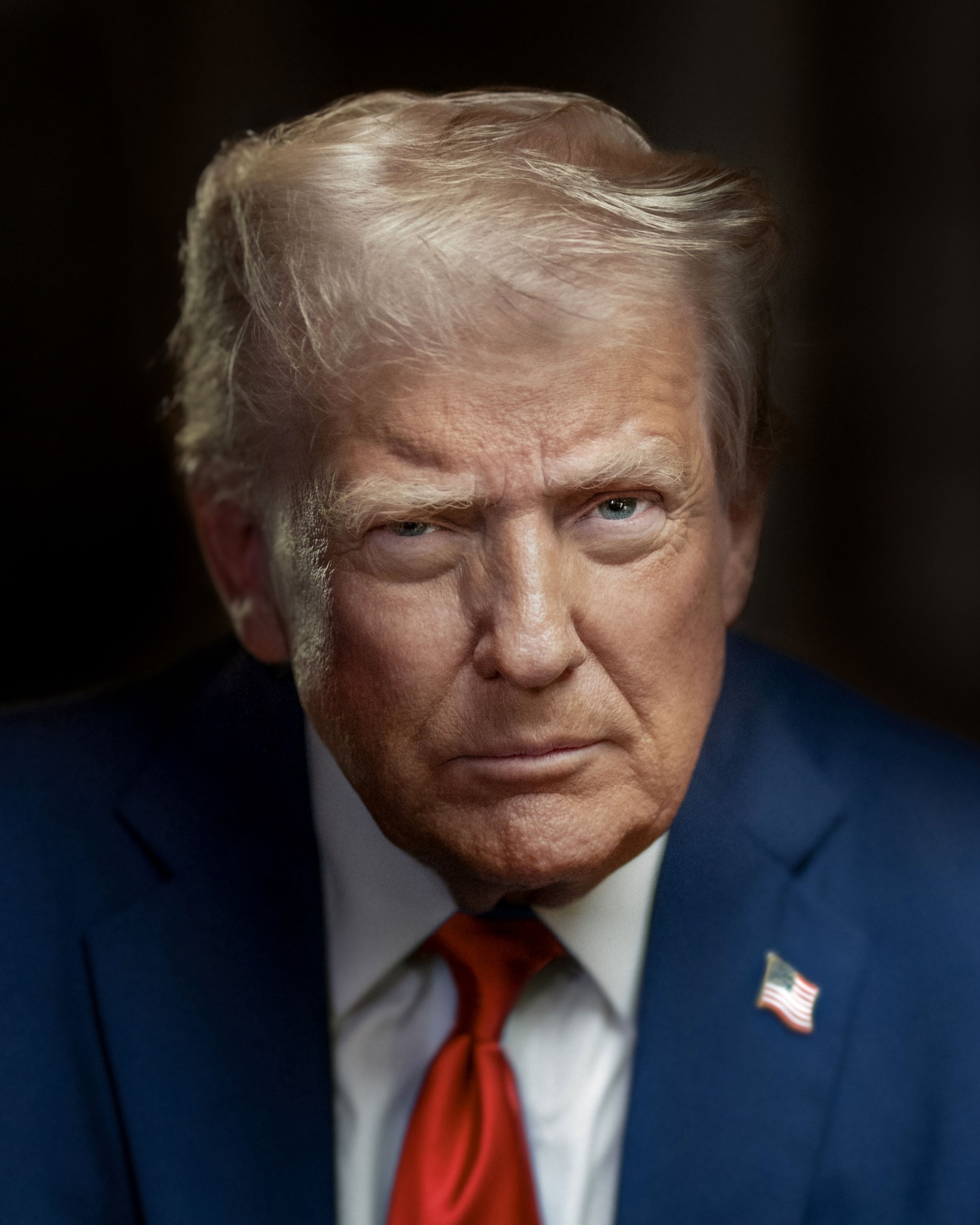
Donald Trump, 47th President of the United States of America

Eswatini–United States relations have existed since Eswatini became independent in 1968. They have included educational exchanges, security assistance and training, and Peace Corps activities.

In July 2025, the United States deported five migrants to Eswatini as part of the Trump administration's third-country deportation program; the Eswatini government said that it intended to repatriate them to their countries of origin. In December 2025, the two countries signed a health care assistance agreement under which the United States agreed to provide up to $205 million over five years.

== History ==
The United States seeks to maintain and strengthen the bilateral relations that have existed since the kingdom became independent in 1968. U.S. policy stresses continued economic and political reform and improved industrial relations.

The U.S. Government brings about six Swati professionals to the United States each year, from both the public and private sectors, primarily for master’s degrees, and about six others for 3-week to 4-week International Visitor programs. Through the security assistance program, the U.S. brings approximately 25 members of the Swati security forces to the United States for education and training purposes.

Peace Corps is a United States Volunteer Organization dedicated to grassroots development and economic growth in developing countries. It is also a service opportunity for U.S. citizens to immerse themselves in a community abroad, working side by side with local leaders to tackle the most pressing challenges of our generation. Peace Corps was officially created by the United States Congress in September 1961 under the leadership of President John F. Kennedy.

The Peace Corps celebrated 60 years or peace and friendship in 2021 and continues to share a unique relationship with the countries and people served. Since 1961, more than 240,000 Americans have served in 142 countries worldwide, including 1,859 in Eswatini.

On 16 July 2025, as part of its third-country deportation program, the Trump administration deported five migrants from Cuba, Jamaica, Laos, Vietnam, and Yemen to Eswatini, stating that the migrants had been convicted of serious crimes. An Eswatini government spokesperson has stated that the migrants pose no threat to the public and that the government would repatriate the migrants to their home countries.

On 18 July 2025, an Eswatini government spokesperson confirmed that the five deportees were being held in solitary confinement until they could be sent back to their home countries.

On December 12, 2025, Eswatini signed an agreement with the United States over health care assistance. The United States agreed to provide up to $205 million in aid over the next five years. In return, Uganda must invest $37 million into its own health care system in this same time period. This deal was part of a larger effort by the Trump administration to procure bilateral aid agreements that differ from the multilateral approach taken by the World Health Organization and differ from traditional USAID delivery methods. The United States has signed similar deals with 16 other African countries as of March 2026.

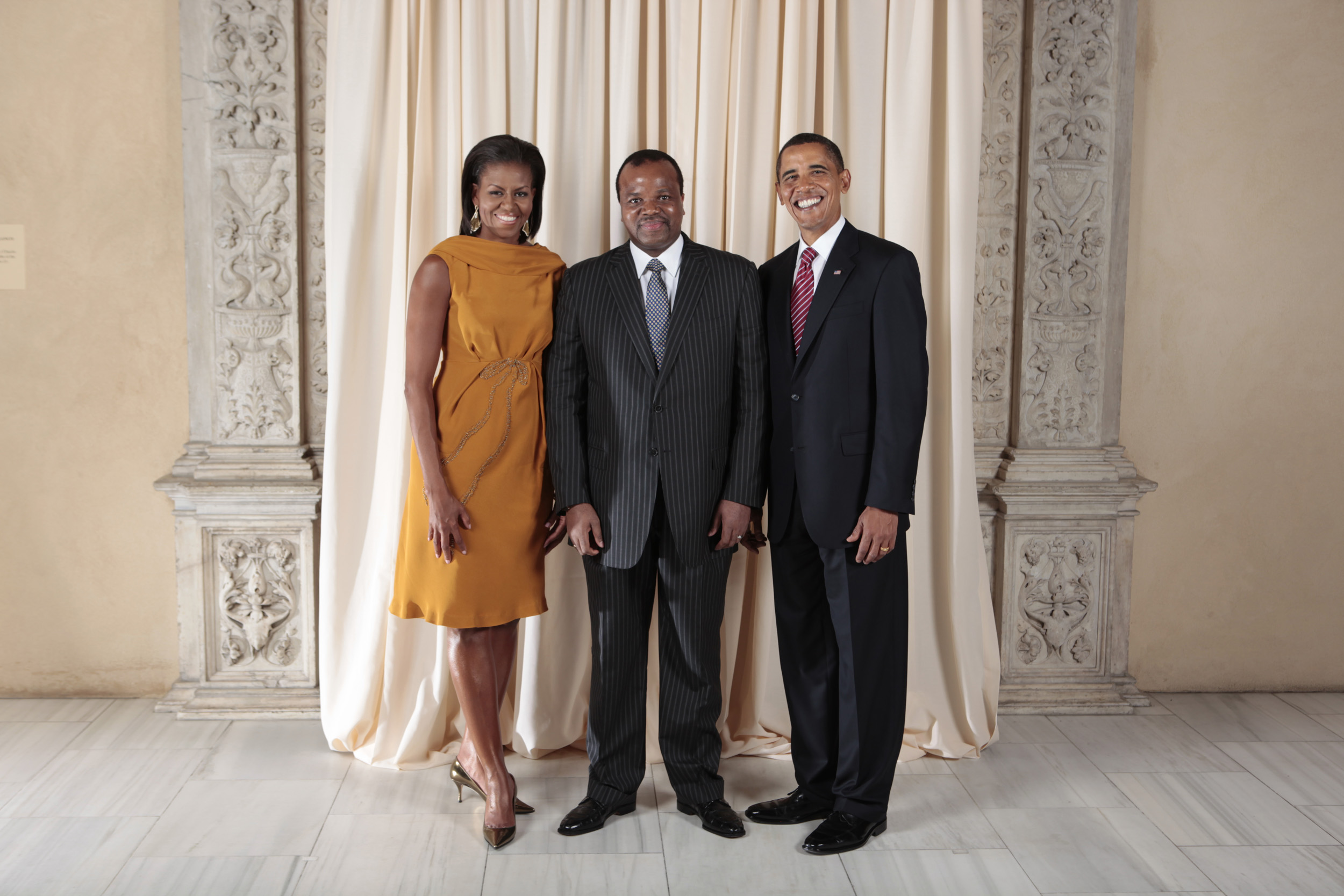
Michelle Obama, Mswati III and Barack Obama (left to right)

== See also ==
- Foreign relations of Eswatini
- Foreign relations of the United States
