= Mozambique–United Kingdom relations =

Relations between Mozambique and the United Kingdom

- Mozambique: United Kingdom

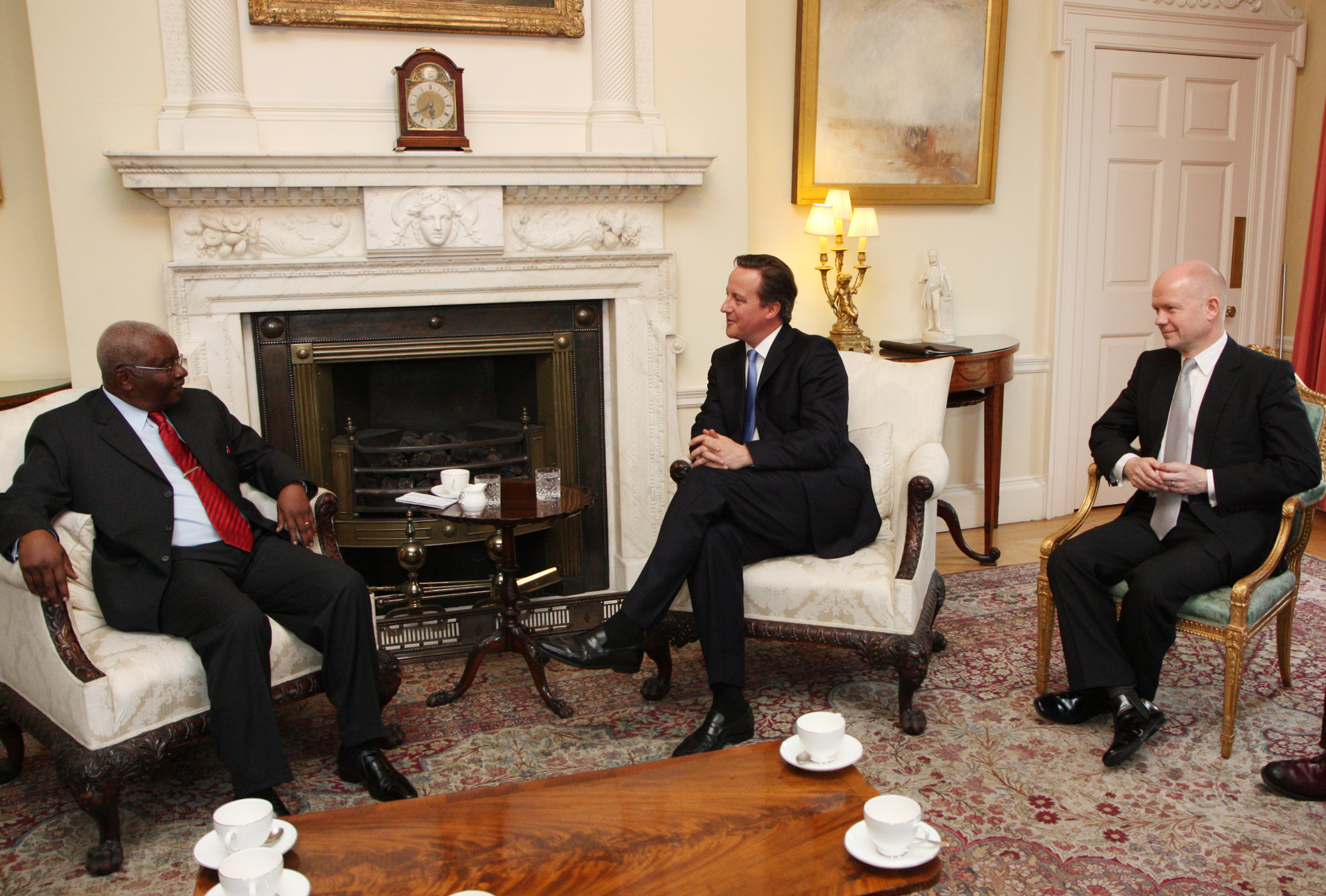
Mozambican President Armando Guebuza with British Prime Minister David Cameron and British Foreign Secretary William Hague in 10 Downing Street, May 2012.

Mozambique–United Kingdom relations are the current and historical relationships between the United Kingdom of Great Britain and Northern Ireland (UK) and the Republic of Mozambique. The two countries established diplomatic relations on 27 August 1975.

Both countries share common membership of the Commonwealth, the United Nations, and the World Trade Organization, as well as the Southern Africa Customs Union and Mozambique–United Kingdom Economic Partnership Agreement. Bilaterally the two countries have a Development Partnership, a High Level Prosperity Partnership, and an Investment Agreement.

== Economic relations ==
From 4 February 2018 until 30 December 2020, trade between Mozambique and the UK was governed by the Southern African Customs Union–European Union Economic Partnership Agreement, while the United Kingdom was a member of the European Union. Following the withdrawal of the United Kingdom from the European Union, the UK and the 'Southern Africa Customs Union and Mozambique', a trade bloc of which Mozambique is a member, signed a continuity trade agreement on 9 October 2019, based on the EU free trade agreement; the agreement entered into force on 1 January 2021. Trade value between the 'Southern Africa Customs Union and Mozambique' and the United Kingdom was worth £12,539 million in 2022.

== Diplomatic missions ==
As Commonwealth nations Mozambique and the United Kingdom are accredited to each other through high commissions.

- Mozambique maintains a high commission in London.
- The United Kingdom is accredited to Mozambique through its high commission in Maputo.

== See also ==
- Foreign relations of Mozambique
- Foreign relations of the United Kingdom
- Southern Africa Customs Union and Mozambique–United Kingdom Economic Partnership Agreement
