= Embassy of Eswatini, Taipei =

Embassy of Eswatini to the Republic of China

Embassy of Eswatini in Taipei 史瓦帝尼王國駐台大使館
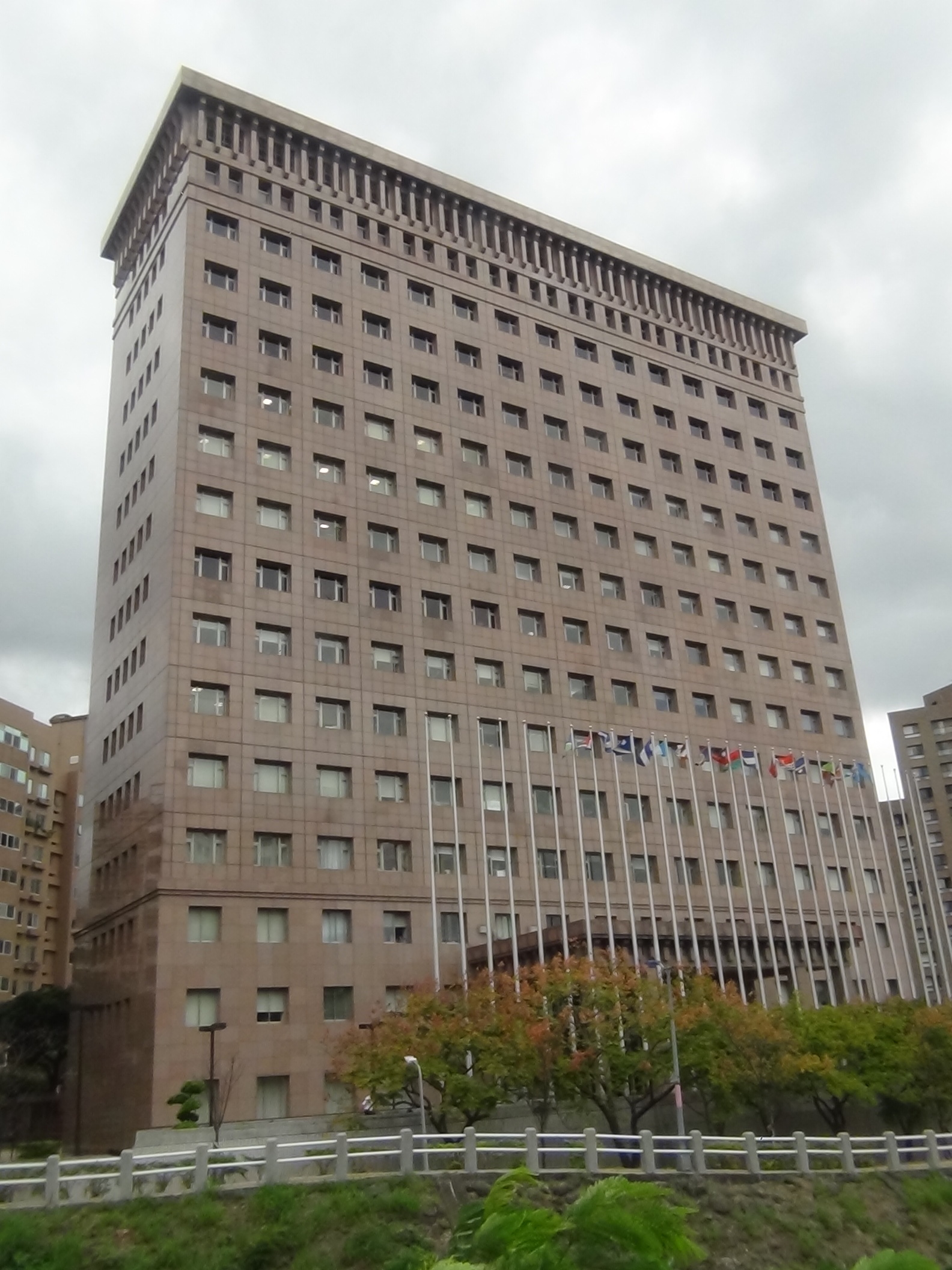
- The Embassy of Eswatini at the Diplomatic Quarter
- Location: Shilin, Taipei, Taiwan
- Chargé d'affaires: Nontokozo Shongwe-Tsabedze

The Embassy of Eswatini in Taipei (Chinese: 史瓦帝尼王國駐台大使館; pinyin: Shǐwǎdìní Wángguó Zhù Tái Dàshǐ Guǎn) is the embassy of Eswatini in Taipei, Republic of China (Taiwan). The two countries have had diplomatic relations since Swaziland's independence in 1968. However, Swaziland was initially represented in Taipei by a Consulate.

This tiny kingdom is one of the 13 countries that has diplomatic relations with Taiwan. After the diplomatic breakdown between Burkina Faso and Taiwan in May 2018, Eswatini is the only country in Africa which has no diplomatic relations with the People's Republic of China.

Its counterpart body in Eswatini is the Embassy of the Republic of China (Taiwan) in Mbabane, the Kingdom of Eswatini.

== See also ==
- Eswatini–Taiwan relations
- List of diplomatic missions in Taiwan
- Foreign relations of Eswatini
