= Foreign relations of Eswatini =

Eswatini is a member of the United Nations, the Commonwealth of Nations, the African Union, the Common Market for Eastern and Southern Africa, and the Southern African Development Community. Currently, the Kingdom of Eswatini maintains 11 embassies and High Commissions along with 15 consulates and other representations around the world, while there are five embassies and High Commissions in Eswatini as well as 14 consulates and other representations.

== Diplomatic relations ==
List of countries which Eswatini maintains diplomatic relations with:

#	Country	Date
1	United Kingdom	6 September 1968
2	United States	6 September 1968
3	Portugal	6 September 1968
—	Taiwan	16 September 1968
4	Israel	September 1968
5	Canada	29 October 1968
6	South Korea	6 November 1968
7	Germany	15 November 1968
8	Netherlands	1968
9	France	17 April 1969
10	Italy	April 1969
11	Switzerland	6 August 1969
12	Belgium	14 November 1969
13	Iran	15 December 1969
14	Kenya	18 May 1970
15	Austria	1970
16	Ethiopia	1 January 1971
17	Zambia	31 March 1971
18	Japan	21 May 1971
19	India	5 November 1971
20	Australia	9 July 1973
21	Nigeria	13 October 1973
22	Egypt	20 November 1973
23	Sweden	1973
24	Uganda	23 January 1974
25	Tanzania	20 February 1974
26	Malta	25 March 1974
27	Argentina	1 April 1974
28	Mozambique	11 September 1975
29	Mexico	23 December 1975
30	Lesotho	12 February 1976
31	Botswana	20 May 1976
32	Guinea	1977
33	Brazil	23 June 1978
34	Democratic Republic of the Congo	June 1978
35	Ghana	June 1978
36	Chile	25 September 1978
37	Spain	6 April 1979
38	Greece	1979
39	Turkey	20 January 1981
40	Zimbabwe	27 November 1981
41	Norway	11 December 1984
42	Malaysia	31 March 1987
43	Peru	8 June 1989
44	Angola	8 November 1989
45	Hungary	9 May 1990
46	Poland	10 May 1990
47	Serbia	1 June 1990
48	Finland	20 September 1990
49	Romania	12 December 1990
50	Czech Republic	4 January 1991
51	Jamaica	13 February 1991
52	Thailand	17 January 1991
53	Indonesia	12 April 1991
54	Cambodia	13 December 1991
55	Namibia	28 February 1992
—	Holy See	11 March 1992
56	Brunei	11 May 1992
57	Singapore	1 September 1992
58	Slovakia	1 January 1993
59	Philippines	19 February 1993
60	Guyana	26 February 1993
61	South Africa	1 October 1993
62	Iceland	3 December 1993
63	Algeria	1994
64	Bulgaria	30 January 1995
65	Cuba	22 September 1995
66	Kuwait	22 May 1996
67	Morocco	June 1996
68	Denmark	4 February 1997
69	Mauritius	7 October 1997
70	Ukraine	13 May 1998
71	Luxembourg	16 December 1998
72	Russia	19 October 1999
73	Sri Lanka	27 June 2000
74	New Zealand	2000
75	Fiji	14 March 2002
76	Seychelles	14 March 2002
77	Qatar	31 October 2002
78	Tonga	22 May 2003
79	Bahrain	9 September 2005
80	United Arab Emirates	2 November 2005
81	Venezuela	21 September 2006
82	North Macedonia	6 July 2007
83	Paraguay	3 April 2007
84	North Korea	20 September 2007
85	Costa Rica	24 September 2007
86	Dominican Republic	10 October 2007
87	Bangladesh	2008
88	Yemen	21 October 2009
89	Bosnia and Herzegovina	25 November 2009
90	Azerbaijan	7 January 2010
—	State of Palestine	3 November 2010
91	Bhutan	21 August 2012
92	Montenegro	27 February 2013
93	Oman	18 March 2013
94	Moldova	21 March 2013
95	Armenia	3 May 2013
96	Vietnam	29 May 2013
97	Suriname	7 June 2013
98	Rwanda	30 August 2014
99	Equatorial Guinea	19 February 2015
100	Saudi Arabia	30 March 2015
101	Madagascar	21 October 2015
102	Kazakhstan	16 May 2016
103	Georgia	20 May 2016
104	Eritrea	30 March 2017
105	Mauritania	22 March 2018
106	Sudan	27 March 2018
107	Saint Kitts and Nevis	7 June 2018
108	Tajikistan	12 November 2018
109	Latvia	16 November 2018
110	Estonia	21 November 2018
111	Mongolia	21 November 2018
112	Croatia	5 April 2019
113	Marshall Islands	11 April 2019
114	Nepal	9 May 2019
115	Ireland	8 August 2019
116	Nicaragua	17 September 2019
117	Maldives	15 December 2020
118	Lithuania	1 April 2021
119	Burundi	4 August 2022
120	Belarus	4 June 2024
121	Ivory Coast	8 August 2024
122	Kyrgyzstan	24 July 2025
123	Turkmenistan	5 August 2025
124	Djibouti	17 June 2026
125	Cyprus	Unknown
126	Gabon	Unknown
127	Liberia	Unknown
128	Libya	Unknown
129	Pakistan	Unknown
130	Trinidad and Tobago	Unknown
131	Tunisia	Unknown

== Bilateral relations ==
Country	Formal Relations Began	Notes
Canada	10 February 1969	Canada is represented in Eswatini via parallel accreditation of its embassy in Maputo, Mozambique.; Eswatini is represented in Canada through its embassy in Washington, D.C., United States.; Both countries are full members of the Commonwealth of Nations.
Taiwan	16 September 1968	See Eswatini–Taiwan relations Eswatini established diplomatic relations with Taiwan, officially known as the "Republic of China", on 16 September 1968. Eswatini has an embassy in Taipei and Taiwan has an embassy in Mbabane. As of 2018, it is the last African country to recognize Taiwan.
Cyprus		Cyprus is represented in Eswatini through its High Commission in Pretoria, South Africa and by an honorary consulate in Mbabane.; Eswatini is represented in Cyprus through its High Commission in London.; Both countries are full members of the Commonwealth of Nations.
Greece		Greece is represented in Eswatini via parallel accreditation of its embassy in Pretoria, South Africa.; Eswatini is represented in Greece through its embassy in London.
Japan	21 May 1971	Both countries established diplomatic relations on 21 May 1971.; Japan is represented in Eswatini via parallel accreditation of its embassy in Pretoria, South Africa.
Serbia	1 June 1990	Both countries have established diplomatic relations on 1 June 1990.; A number of bilateral agreements have been concluded and are in force between both countries.; Eswatini is accredited to Serbia from its embassy in Brussels, Belgium.; Serbia is accredited to Eswatini from its embassy in Pretoria, South Africa.
Turkey	20 January 1981	The Embassy of the Eswatini in Brussels is accredited to Turkey.; Turkish ambassador in Pretoria to South Africa is also accredited to Eswatini.; Trade volume between the two countries was 309,000 USD in 2019.
United Kingdom	6 September 1968	Eswatini established diplomatic relations with the United Kingdom on 6 September 1968.: Eswatini maintains a high commission in London.; The United Kingdom is accredited to Eswatini through its high commission in Mbabane.; The UK governed Eswatini from 1903 to 1968, when it achieved full independence. Both countries share common membership of the Commonwealth and the World Trade Organization, as well as the SACUM–UK Economic Partnership Agreement. Bilaterally the two countries have a Double Taxation Convention, an Investment Agreement.
United States	6 September 1968	See Eswatini–United States relations The Eswatini embassy in Washington, D.C., USA. The United States assists Eswatini with a number of HIV/AIDS initiatives and programs implemented through the U.S. Agency for International Development (USAID), Centers for Disease Control (CDC), the Peace Corps, African Development Foundation, the Department of Labor, and the Department of Defense. In addition, the U.S. supports small enterprise development, education, military training, institutional and human resources development, agricultural development, and trade capacity building. The U.S. is also the largest bilateral donor to the Global Fund, Eswatini's principal HIV/AIDS funding source. The U.S. Government sends about 4 Swazi professionals to the United States each year, from both the public and private sectors, primarily for master's degrees, and about 5 others for three- to four-week International Visitor programs.: Eswatini has an embassy in Washington, D.C.; United States has an embassy in Mbabane.

== Foreign embassies, High Commissions, and consulates in Eswatini ==
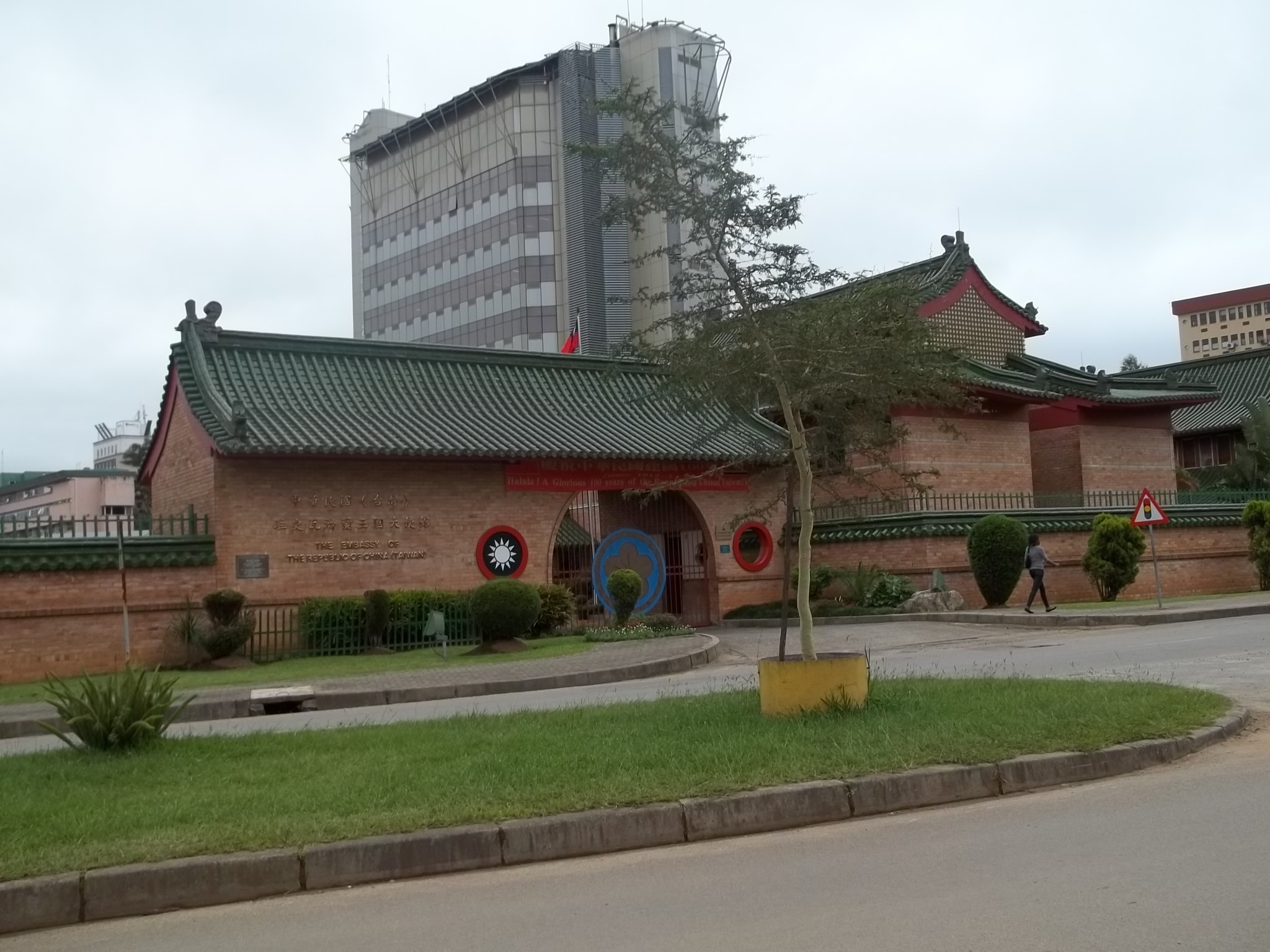
Taiwan Embassy in Eswatini

- Taiwan; in Mbabane, Eswatini
- Republic of Mozambique; in Mbabane, Eswatini
- Republic of India; in Mbabane, Eswatini
- Republic of South Africa; in Mbabane, Eswatini
- United States of America; in Mbabane, Eswatini

== See also ==
- List of diplomatic missions in Eswatini
- List of diplomatic missions of Eswatini
