= Thuli Dladla =

Swazi politician

Thulisile Dladla
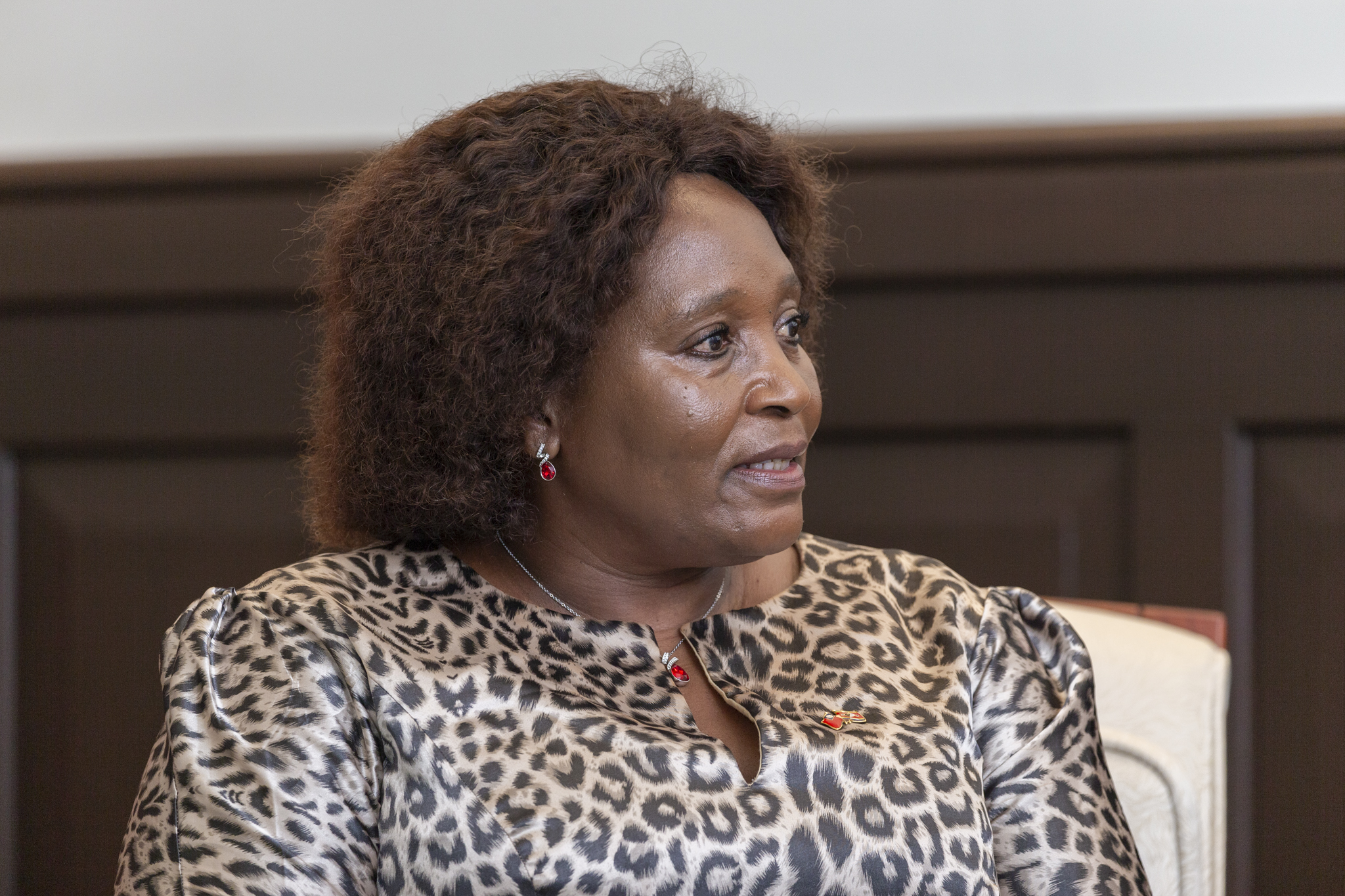
- Dladla in 2019

Deputy Prime Minister of Eswatini
- Incumbent
- Assumed office 13 November 2023
- Monarch: Mswati III
- Prime Minister: Russell Dlamini
- Preceded by: Themba Nhlanganiso Masuku

Personal details
- Party: Independent

Thulisile Dladla is a Liswati politician and diplomat who is currently the Deputy Prime Minister of the Kingdom of Eswatini. She was the first woman appointed as the country's Minister of Foreign Affairs and was previously a senator. In February 2019, she visited Taiwan and met with President Tsai Ing-wen. In May 2026, President Lai Ching-te joined Dladla on her return trip, skirting China's restrictions on his travel to make a state visit to Eswatini.

She was succeeded as Minister of Foreign Affairs by Pholile Shakantu in November 2023.

Dladla graduated from the University of Botswana in 1981. Like other African leaders, including Kwame Nkhrumah and Jomo Kenyatta, Dladla began her career as a classroom teacher. After 27 years in education, Dladla was appointed a member of parliament in 2008.
