= Southern Africa Customs Union and Mozambique–United Kingdom Economic Partnership Agreement =

Economic Partnership Agreement between the Southern African Customs Union Member States and Mozambique, of the one part, and the United Kingdom of Great Britain and Northern Ireland, of the other part
- Southern Africa Customs Union and Mozambique United Kingdom
- Type: Free Trade Agreement
- Context: Trade continuity agreement between the United Kingdom and the Southern Africa Customs Union and Mozambique
- Drafted: 19 March 2017
- Signed: 9 October 2019
- Location: London, United Kingdom
- Effective: 1 January 2021
- Negotiators: Bogolo Kenewendo; George Hollingbery
- Original signatories: Botswana; Eswatini; Lesotho; Mozambique; Namibia; United Kingdom
- Parties: Botswana; Eswatini; Lesotho; Mozambique; Namibia; South Africa; United Kingdom
- Depositary: Foreign, Commonwealth & Development Office
- Languages: English

The Southern Africa Customs Union and Mozambique–United Kingdom Economic Partnership Agreement (SACUM–UK EPA) is a plurilateral free trade agreement between the United Kingdom and the Southern Africa Customs Union, and Mozambique, designed to promote trade, investment, and sustainable development. It largely replicates the existing European Union–Southern African Development Community Economic Partnership Agreement framework, maintaining preferential trade access. The agreement is part of the UK's strategy to maintain and enhance trade relationships with developing countries following its departure from the European Union.

== Agreement ==
The SACUM-UK EPA was signed in October 2019 and entered into force on 1 January 2021, following the United Kingdom’s exit from the European Union. The agreement was designed to replicate and replace the trade preferences that previously existed under the EU-SADC EPA, ensuring continuity for exporters and importers in all participating countries. The agreement provides immediate duty-free and quota-free access for goods exported from Botswana, Eswatini, Lesotho, Mozambique, and Namibia to the UK. South African exports also benefit from preferential access, though some products are subject to tariff rate quotas. In return, the agreement eliminates tariffs on a significant proportion of UK exports to Mozambique and includes provisions for the gradual reduction of duties on UK goods entering SACU and Mozambique.

== See also ==
- Botswana–United Kingdom relations
- Economic Partnership Agreements
- Eswatini–United Kingdom relations
- Foreign relations of Botswana
- Foreign relations of Eswatini
- Foreign relations of Lesotho
- Foreign relations of Mozambique
- Foreign relations of Namibia
- Foreign relations of South Africa
- Foreign relations of the United Kingdom
- Free trade agreements of the United Kingdom
- Mozambique–United Kingdom relations
- Namibia–United Kingdom relations
- South Africa–United Kingdom relations
- Southern Africa Customs Union
