= Namibia–United Kingdom relations =

- Namibia: United Kingdom

Namibia–United Kingdom relations are the bilateral relations between Namibia and the United Kingdom. Both countries are members of the Commonwealth of Nations and the United Nations.

== History ==
During the Scramble for Africa, while present-day Namibia was occupied by Germany and known as German South West Africa, the United Kingdom occupied Walvis Bay and incorporated the port area to its possession in the Cape Colony. In 1890, the British government apportioned the Caprivi Strip to Germany. This would give Germany access to the Zambezi River and its other East African territories, and it would give up its claims on Zanzibar (which was transferred to the United Kingdom).

In 1915, during World War I, troops from South Africa invaded and occupied the territory. After the war, with the signing of the Treaty of Versailles, Germany was forced to transfer its territory to the Union of South Africa in 1920, which at the time was a self-governing dominion of the British Empire. The territory would be called South West Africa for the next 70 years. South West Africa was not allowed to be annexed by South Africa, rather it was governed as a mandated territory.

In 1961, South Africa became a republic and continued to govern Namibia under its Apartheid rule. In 1966, SWAPO launched an armed struggle against South African occupation which became known as the South African Border War. In 1977, the UK joined the Western Contact Group, a diplomatic effort aimed at bringing an internationally acceptable transition to independence for Namibia. In September 1978, the UK voted for the United Nations Security Council Resolution 435 which proposed a ceasefire and UN-supervised elections in the South African-controlled South West Africa which ultimately led to Namibia's independence in exchange for the withdrawal of Cuban troops from Angola during the Border war. In 1989, UN observed elections were held and Namibians overwhelmingly voted for SWAPO and independence. In April 1989, British Prime Minister Margaret Thatcher paid a visit to the country, the very day when hostilities on all sides of the conflict where to formally cease.

In 1989, the United Kingdom established a British Liaison Office in Windhoek. In March 1990, Namibia gained its independence from South Africa and immediately afterwards the UK recognized and established diplomatic relations with Namibia and converted its Liaison Office to a High Commission. That same year, Namibia opened a high commission in London.

== High level visits ==
In October 1991, Queen Elizabeth II paid an official visit to Namibia and met with President Sam Nujoma. There would be several high level visits between leaders of both nations. In June 2016, UK Minister for Africa, James Duddridge, paid a visit to Namibia with a purpose on bolstering bilateral relations and expanding trade links with the nation.

== Trade ==
In 2022, bilateral trade between Namibia and the United Kingdom totaled US$139 million. Namibia's main export products to the UK include: wood and cork; mechanical power generators; vegetables and fruit; general industrial machinery and meat and meat preparations. The UK's main export products to Namibia include: vehicles and cars; medicinal and pharmaceutical product; textile fabrics and plastics in primary forms.

From 10 October 2016 until 30 December 2020, trade between Namibia and the UK was governed by the Southern African Customs Union–European Union Economic Partnership Agreement, while the United Kingdom was a member of the European Union. Following the withdrawal of the United Kingdom from the European Union, the UK and the Southern Africa Customs Union and Mozambique, including Namibia, signed a continuity trade agreement on 9 October 2019, based on the EU free trade agreement; the agreement entered into force on 1 January 2021. Trade value between the 'Southern Africa Customs Union and Mozambique' and the United Kingdom was worth £12,539 million in 2022.

== Resident diplomatic missions ==
of Namibia in the United Kingdom

- London (High Commission)

of the United Kingdom in Namibia

- Windhoek (High Commission)

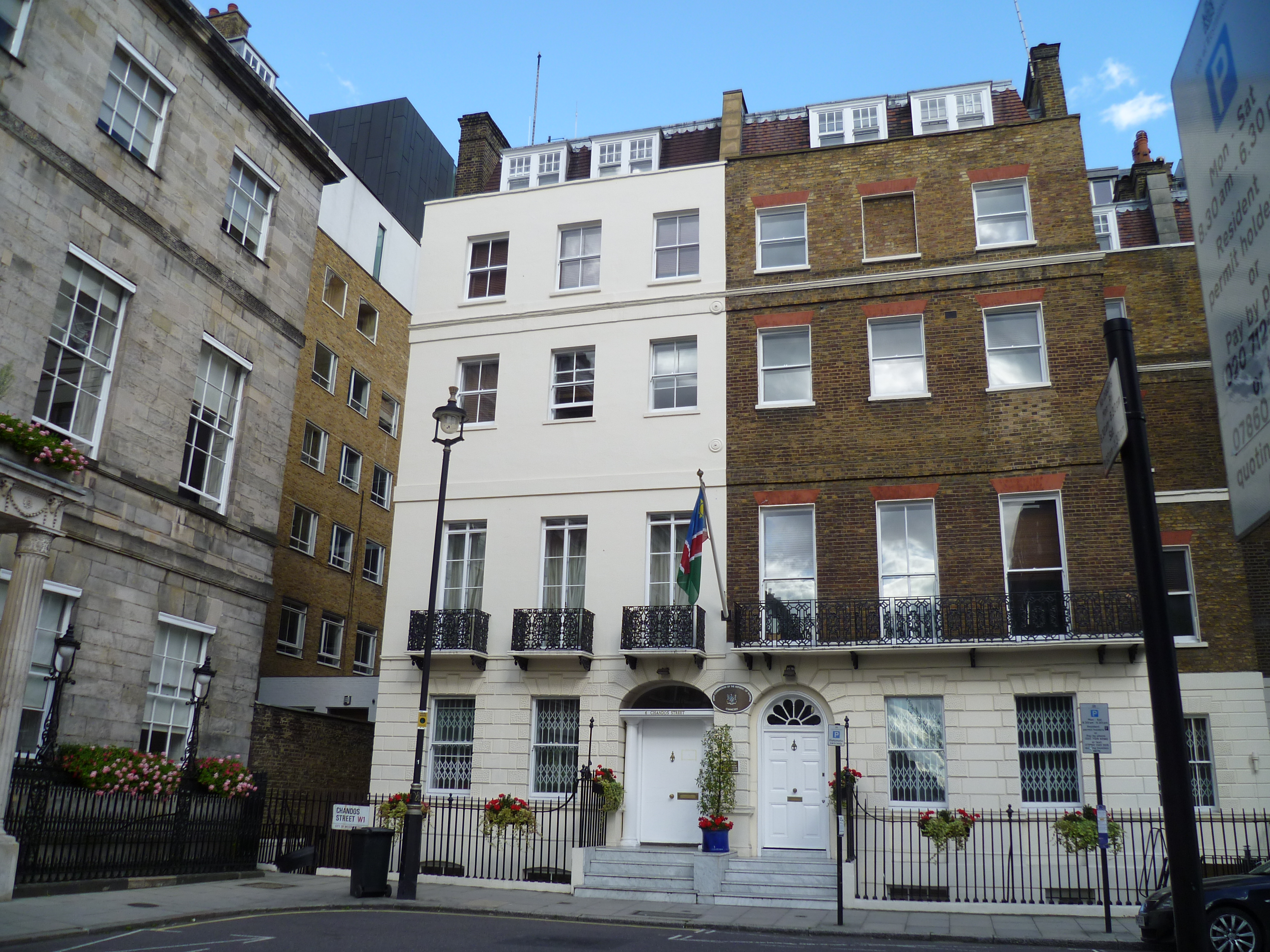
High Commission of Namibia in London

== See also ==
- British diaspora in Africa
- Foreign relations of Namibia
- Foreign relations of the United Kingdom
- Southern Africa Customs Union and Mozambique–United Kingdom Economic Partnership Agreement
