= Pholile Shakantu =

Liswati politician

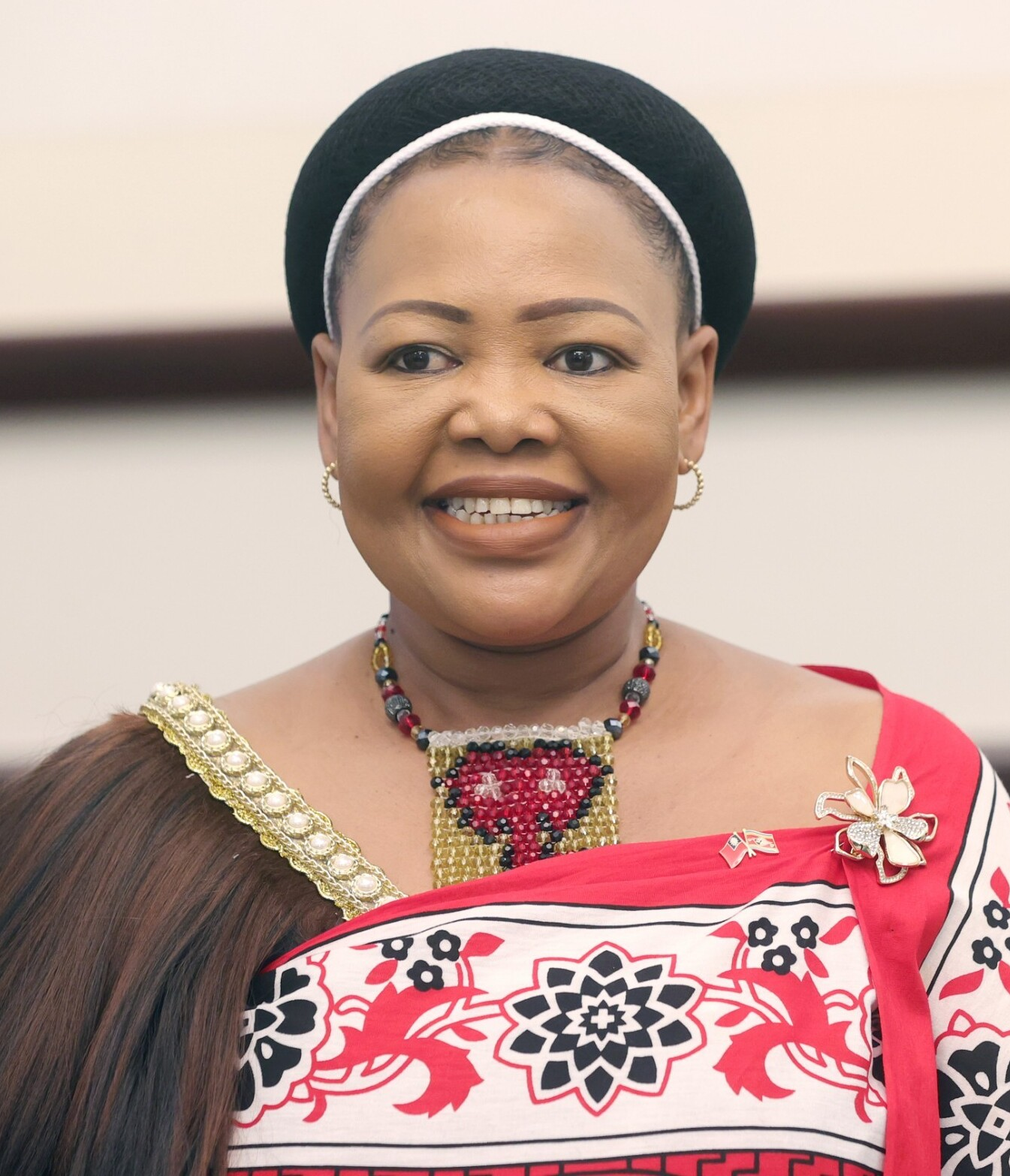
- Education: University of Eswatini; Leeds Beckett University
- Occupations: lawyer and politician
- Known for: Ministerial career
- Website: pholileshakantu.com

Pholile Dlamini Shakantu is a Liswati lawyer, politician, and media producer. She served as Minister of Justice and Constitutional Affairs from 2018 to 2023, and has been the Minister of Foreign Affairs and International Cooperation from 2023.

== Life and education ==
Shakantu is an admitted attorney, conveyancer, and notary public. She holds a BA in Law and LLB from the University of Eswatini and an MSc in Leadership and Change Management from Leeds Beckett University. She has also received training in telecoms law and regulation, corporate governance, military justice, and business administration.

Before entering politics, she had a legal career spanning over two decades in both corporate and private spheres, with 12 years of experience in the telecommunications sector in executive roles covering legal, regulatory, and corporate affairs. She also served as a member of the Judicial Service Commission and as Deputy Chairman of the Elections and Boundaries Commission.

== Political career ==
In 2018, King Mswati III appointed Shakantu as a Member of Parliament and subsequently as Minister of Justice and Constitutional Affairs. During her tenure she spearheaded the digitisation of the justice sector, resulting in the introduction of the Electronic Case Management System. She also championed access to justice for vulnerable groups through the launch of Small Claims Courts and Legal Aid services.

She was appointed as a senator by the King on 5 November 2023 after the appointment of Russell Dlamini as the 12th Prime Minister to advise the king about new ministers. There are meant to be about thirty senators in Eswatini and she was one of twenty appointed by the King. Later on 13 November she was appointed Minister of Foreign Affairs and International Cooperation.

== Diplomatic career ==
In 2024, Shakantu visited the Republic of China (Taiwan) and was received by President Tsai Ing-wen and Vice President Lai Ching-te as an ally. Eswatini is the only remaining country in Africa that recognises the Republic of China (Taiwan). Tsai thanked Shakantu for her country's support including speaking up at the United Nations. Shakantu and Taiwan's Foreign Minister Joseph Wu signed an agreement reaffirming the two countries' close relationship. Over 25 years Taiwan's assistance to Eswatini is estimated to be worth more than two billion dollars.

The Taiwan government started its own digital platform TaiwanPlus in 2021. Shakantu was shown TaiwanPlus by Deputy Digital Minister Yeh Ning, and they discussed how it could help co-operation and counter disinformation.

In May 2024, Shakantu visited Ankara where she met Turkish Foreign Minister Hakan Fidan. During the visit, Eswatini and Türkiye signed a Memorandum of Understanding on Cooperation in the Field of Protocol.

In April 2026, Shakantu convened the Consultative Programme for Ambassadors at Royal Villas in Ezulwini, under the theme "Aligning Eswatini's Diplomatic Missions with Government Development Priorities while strengthening governance, compliance, and institutional effectiveness." She called on Eswatini's ambassadors to move beyond ceremonial roles and actively drive national development through purposeful diplomacy, with missions expected to support national development, facilitate investment and trade, strengthen bilateral and multilateral partnerships, and safeguard the interests of the Kingdom. She also highlighted the newly opened Ezulwini Palazzo International Convention Centre, inaugurated by King Mswati III, as a symbol of Eswatini's ambition to become a premier destination for high-level international engagements.

In May 2026, Shakantu publicly called for a woman to be appointed as the next United Nations Secretary-General, speaking before ambassadors and European Union representatives at the third Eswatini-EU Partnership Dialogue held at the Hilton Hotel in Mbabane. The dialogue marked 50 years of partnership between Eswatini and the EU. Noting that across eight decades the position had been held exclusively by men, she argued that the UN should set an example for the gender equality it promotes. She cited her participation in a meeting hosted by Canada's Foreign Affairs Minister Mélanie Joly and co-chaired with Jamaica's Foreign Affairs and Foreign Trade Minister Senator Kamina Johnson Smith, at which women foreign ministers collectively resolved to advocate for a female Secretary-General. On broader multilateral issues, Shakantu reaffirmed that Eswatini remains guided by the Ezulwini Consensus on UN Security Council reform, calling Africa's under-representation in global governance structures a matter requiring urgent attention. She described Eswatini's enduring foreign policy as being "a friend to all and an enemy to none", expressed in siSwati as anginasitha.

== Media and cultural production ==
Shakantu is the founder of Genesis Ekucaleni Media, an Eswatini-based production company dedicated to nurturing local film, music, and media talent through high-quality productions that preserve culture and promote authentic storytelling.

Its flagship production is BakaNgwane, described as Eswatini's largest locally produced historical drama series, which traces the origins of the Swati nation, the migration of the Nguni peoples, and the leadership of King Matalatala. Shakantu, who serves as executive producer, said the series was inspired by her concern at the limited understanding of Eswatini's history and identity among young people, and her desire to counter false narratives about the Kingdom for both local and international audiences. The project began as a documentary but evolved into a drama series to allow creative treatment of gaps in the historical record. A media preview was held in December 2025 at Sharma House in Ezulwini ahead of the series' premiere on Eswatini TV, attended by Cabinet ministers, the Senate President, and senior officials. Beyond entertainment, the production is intended to safeguard siSwati language, traditional attire, and cultural practices, while inspiring a new generation of emaSwati filmmakers and storytellers.

Genesis Ekucaleni Media also executive produced the album A New Dawn by artist Nothando Hlophe, featuring tracks including Methodist Medley and Sithumela Wena. The project received continental recognition, including the Best of Africa Award. Other productions include the short film Sidlo Sekugcina, which presents contemporary Eswatini narratives and connects to an upcoming music project, Usikhumbule. The company also runs the Divine Artist Drama Lab, a mentorship and training initiative focused on emerging theatre talent. Genesis Ekucaleni Media works in partnership with Tribe Studios and with Mbabane-based Lokuhle Media Group, which provides technical production support for music, live recordings, and major events.

== Civil society ==
Shakantu is the founder and patron of the Eswatini Network of Women, an organisation focused on empowering women in sports, politics, and the arts.
