= Embassy of Taiwan, Mbabane =

Political representative office in Mbabane, Eswatini

Embassy of the Republic of China in the Kingdom of Eswatini 中華民國駐史瓦帝尼王國大使館
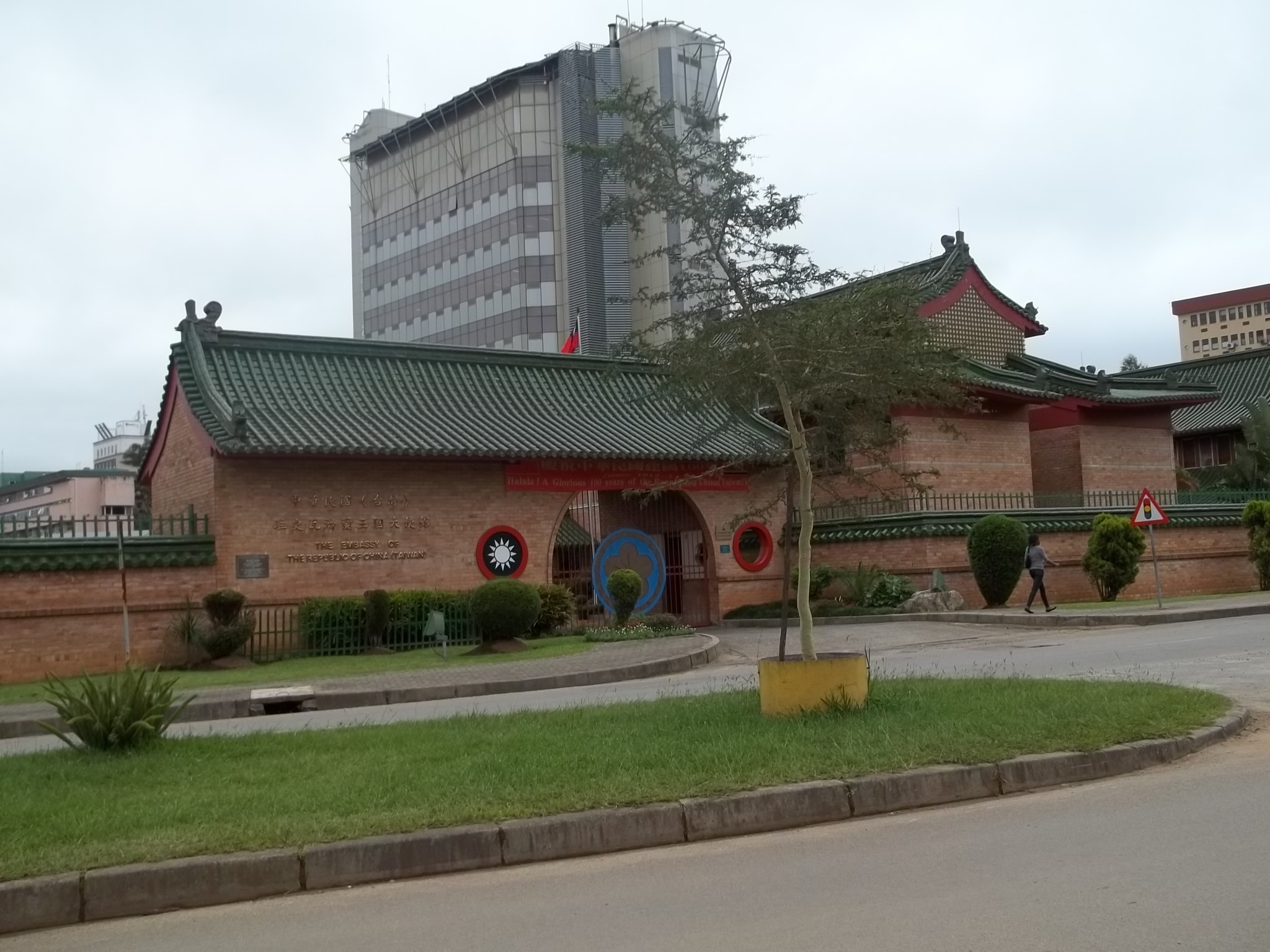
- Embassy of the Republic of China in Mbabane
- Location: Mbabane
- Coordinates: 26.326758°S 31.146687°E
- Ambassador: Jeremy H. S. Liang
- Jurisdiction: Eswatini
- Website: Embassy of the Republic of China in the Kingdom of Eswatini

The Embassy of the Republic of China in the Kingdom of Eswatini (Chinese: 中華民國駐史瓦帝尼王國大使館; pinyin: Zhōnghuá Mínguó Zhù Shǐwǎdìní Wángguó Dàshǐguǎn) is the embassy of the Republic of China (ROC; commonly called Taiwan) in Mbabane, Eswatini. The two countries have had diplomatic relations since Eswatini's independence in 1968.

Eswatini is one of the 11 countries that recognise the ROC. As of 2019, it is the only country in Africa that does not have diplomatic relations with the People's Republic of China due to the One China Policy.

It is one of five diplomatic missions in the country, along with the American embassy, the South African and Mozambique High Commissions, and a Qatari embassy.

The embassy also has responsibility for Mozambique. However, it is not accredited to Maputo, as Mozambique has maintained diplomatic relations with the People's Republic of China since its independence from Portugal in 1975.

Its counterpart body in Taiwan is the Embassy of Eswatini, Taipei.

== See also ==
- Eswatini–Taiwan relations
- List of diplomatic missions of Taiwan
- List of diplomatic missions in Eswatini
- Taipei Economic and Cultural Representative Office
