= South Africa–United Kingdom relations =

- South Africa: United Kingdom

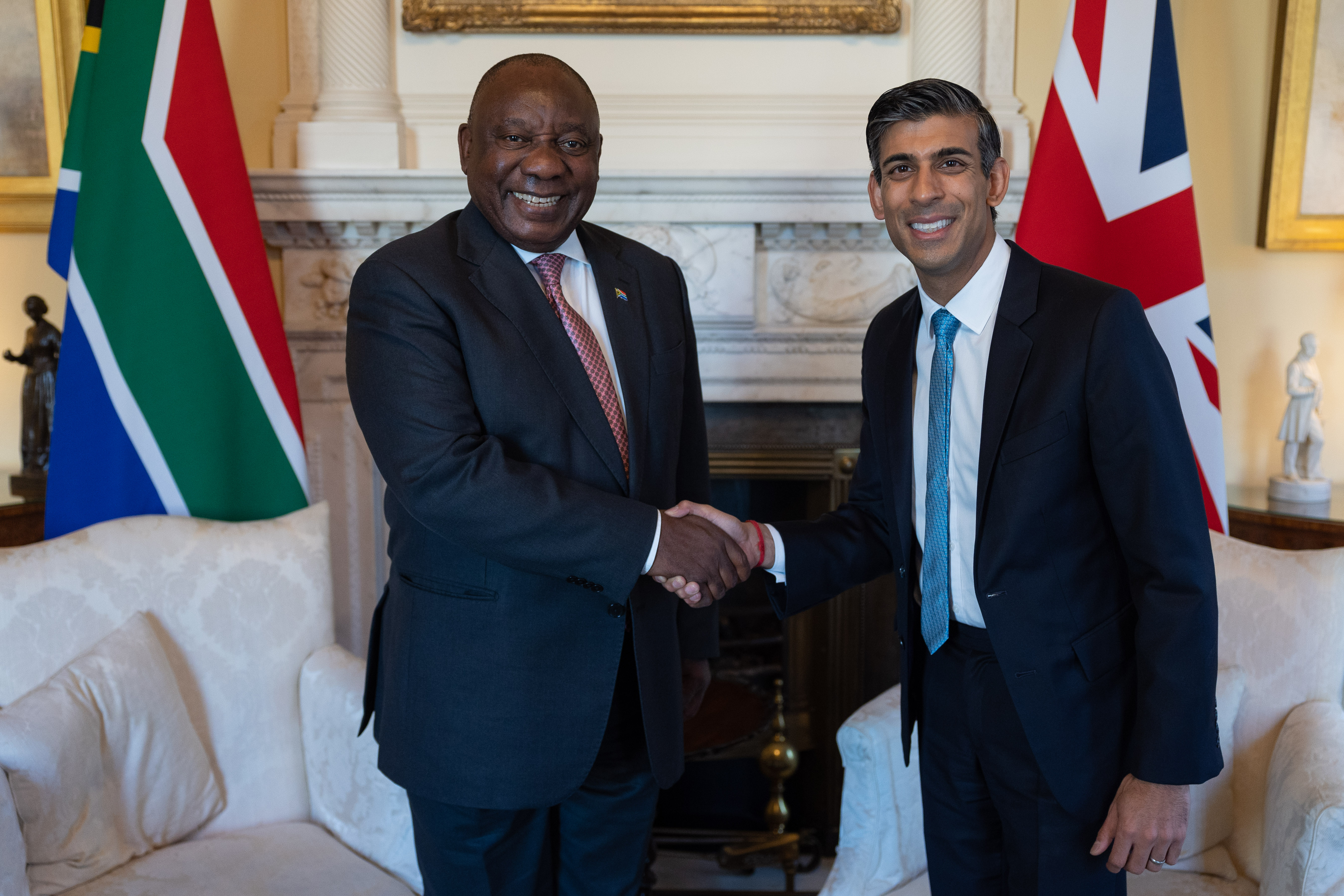
South African President Cyril Ramaphosa with British Prime Minister Rishi Sunak in 10 Downing Street, November 2022.

The Republic of South Africa and the United Kingdom have maintained historical and current relationships. The UK governed South Africa from 1806 until 1931, when South Africa gained full independence.

Ties between South Africa and the UK include a shared language (English) and cultural links, similar systems of law and finance, and a shared passion for the same sports as well as a common interest in promoting trade and a rules-based international system. There are also large numbers of South Africans living in the UK as there are a large numbers of British citizens and people of British descent living in South Africa. A sizeable minority of South Africans are of British ancestry due to it being a colony of the British Empire. As of 2011, there were some 1.6 million South Africans of British ancestry. It is estimated that as of 2010 around 227,000 South Africans resided in the United Kingdom.

Both countries share common membership of the Commonwealth, the G20, the International Criminal Court, and the World Trade Organization, as well as the SACUM–UK Economic Partnership Agreement. Bilaterally the two countries have a Development Partnership, and a Double Taxation Convention.

== History of South Africa ==
Union of South Africa–United Kingdom relations
- South Africa: United Kingdom

The United Kingdom and the area of Southern Africa that is today known as South Africa, have had a long history with the UK playing a deeply important role in the formation of the modern Republic of South Africa. The beginning of relations between South Africa and the UK began on 31 May 1910 when the Union of South Africa was founded as a Dominion of the British Empire. From 1910 until South Africa declared itself a republic outside the Commonwealth of Nations on 31 May 1961, South Africa fought in support and as a part of the British Empire in both World War I and II.

When South Africa was pulled out of the Commonwealth of Nations in 1961, the United Kingdom opposed monetary and economic sanctions. The United Kingdom had many key trade links and, in particular, needed South Africa's gold.

There were also tactical motives for not severing all ties with the apartheid government. As the southernmost nation in Africa, and the juncture at which the Indian and Atlantic Oceans collided, South Africa was still a vital point in sea-trade routes. In 1969, the Commandant General of the South African Defence Force (SADF) confirmed that, "In the entire ocean expanse from Australia to South America, South Africa is the only fixed point offering modern naval bases, harbours and airfield facilities, a modern developed industry and stable government."

From 1960-61, the relationship between South Africa and the UK started to change. In his "Winds of Change" speech in Cape Town, the then British Prime Minister Harold Macmillan spoke of the changes in Africa and how South Africa's racist policies were swimming upstream:

As a fellow member of the Commonwealth it is our earnest desire to give South Africa our support and encouragement, but I hope you won't mind my saying frankly that there are some aspects of your policies which make it impossible for us to do this without being false to our own deep convictions about the political destinies of free men to which in our own territories we are trying to give effect.

In 1984, the then State President of South Africa, P. W. Botha visited the UK as part of a tour of European nations and met Margaret Thatcher. Speaking to the House of Commons of it, she said "I expressed our strongly-held views on apartheid. I told Mr. Botha of my particular concern at the practice of forced removals and raised the question of the continued detention of Mr. Nelson Mandela."

Margaret Thatcher's opposition to economic sanctions was challenged by visiting anti-apartheid activists, including South African bishop Desmond Tutu, whom she met in London, and Oliver Tambo, exiled leader of the outlawed African National Congress (ANC) guerrilla movement, whose links to the Soviet bloc she viewed with suspicion, and whom she declined to see because he espoused violence and refused to condemn guerrilla attacks and mob killings of black policemen, local officials and their families.

At a Commonwealth summit in Nassau in October 1985, Thatcher agreed to impose limited sanctions and to set up a contact group to promote a dialogue with Pretoria, after she was warned by Third World leaders, including Indian prime minister Rajiv Gandhi and Malaysian prime minister Mahathir Mohamad, that her opposition threatened to break up the 49-nation organisation of the Commonwealth. In return, calls for a total embargo were abandoned, and the existing restrictions adopted by member states against South Africa were lifted. ANC president Tambo expressed disappointment at this major compromise.

In August 1986, however, UK sanctions against apartheid South Africa were extended to include a "voluntary ban" on tourism and new investments.

Since the fall of the apartheid system, South Africa has returned to the Commonwealth of Nations as a republic in the Commonwealth of Nations. Former UK Prime Minister David Cameron wrote of "mistakes my party made in the past with respect to relations with the ANC and sanctions on South Africa", irking many older Conservative Party members.

== Post-apartheid relations ==
Since the end of apartheid, the two countries have enjoyed largely good relations. In 2010, the United Kingdom implemented visa restrictions on South Africans travelling to the country due to concerns about corruption within the South African Department of Home Affairs and the ease with which foreign nationals could get South African passports. This marked a turning point in bilateral relations between the two countries with relations cooling off since. In 2013 the British government announced it would halt the £19 million (R271 million) it gives in development aid to South Africa from 2015. In a tit-for-tat response the South African government imposed visa restrictions on British diplomats in September 2014.

== Economic relations ==
As of 2012, the United Kingdom remains one of the top two investors in the South African economy.

=== Trading ===
From 1998-2003, The UK was South Africa's third-largest source of imports after which it then dropped to sixth-largest in 2008. The UK was the top recipient of South African exports in 2001 and 2002 but dropped to fourth-largest by 2008. Exports from South Africa to the UK are dominated by precious stones, mineral products, vehicles (including vessels), machinery and mechanical products, fruit and vegetables, base metals and articles, prepared foodstuffs and beverages. Exports from the UK to South Africa are dominated by turbo jets, turbo propellers, gas turbines, machinery, mechanical appliances, electrical equipment, vehicles (including aircraft and vessels), and chemicals. In December 2011, UK Parliamentary Under-Secretary of State, Henry Bellingham MP, announced that Anglo-South African bilateral trade should be doubled by the year 2015.

In a speech on 28 August 2018, then-Prime Minister Theresa May pledged £4,000,000,000 in support for the South African economy following a trade mission in an effort to both refocus aid-spending on economic and security challenges in the country and reaffirm commitment to trade following Brexit.

While the United Kingdom was a member of the European Union, trade between South Africa and the UK was governed by the Trade, Development and Cooperation Agreement was signed in 1999 and came into force in 2004. In anticipation of the withdrawal of the United Kingdom from the EU, the two countries signed a Free trade agreement which rolled over the Economic Partnership Agreement between the EU and South Africa. The Southern Africa Customs Union and Mozambique–United Kingdom Economic Partnership Agreement, which also governs trade between the UK and other members of the Southern Africa Customs Union and Mozambique, entered into force on 1 January 2021.

== Bilateral Forum ==
The South Africa-United Kingdom Bilateral Forum was founded in 1997 to promote Anglo-South African relations by serving as a forum for the two countries to meet on a bi-annual basis so as to enhance economic and political relations. Top government officials from both countries often meet through this forum to discuss important issues.

== Resident diplomatic missions ==
of South Africa in the United Kingdom

- London (High Commission)

of the United Kingdom in South Africa

- Pretoria (High Commission)
- Cape Town (Consulate-General)

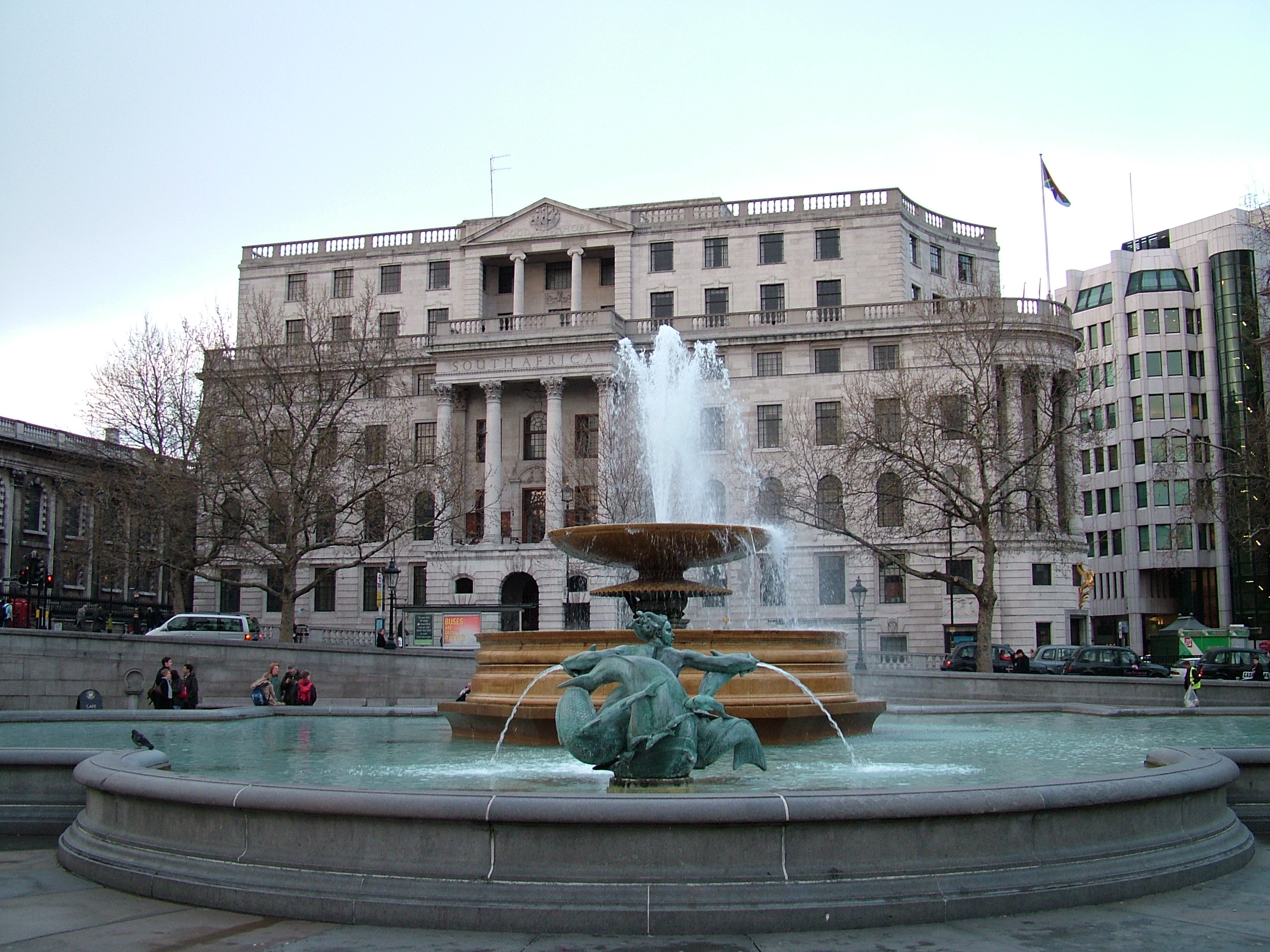
South African High Commission in London

== See also ==
- Afrikaners
- Bantu peoples of South Africa
- High Commission of South Africa, London
- Netherlands–South Africa relations
- Netherlands–United Kingdom relations
- Southern Africa Customs Union and Mozambique–United Kingdom Economic Partnership Agreement
- South Africans in the United Kingdom
