= Eswatini–South Africa relations =

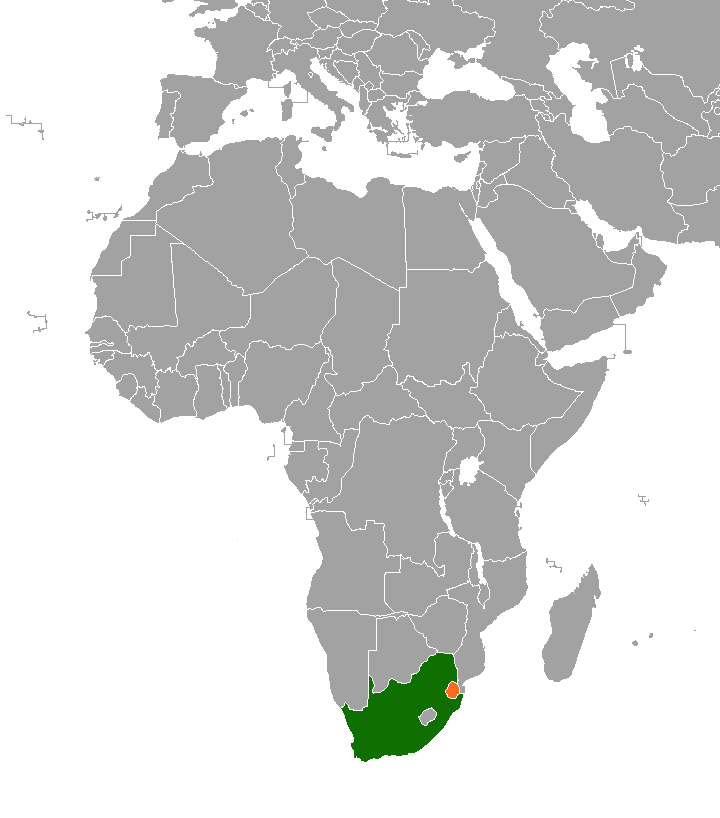
- South Africa: Eswatini

Eswatini–South Africa relations refers to the current and historical relationship between Eswatini and South Africa. South Africa surrounds Eswatini on the north, west and south. The two states share strong historical and cultural ties. Mutual High Commissions were established in Pretoria and Mbabane at the end of the apartheid era in 1994. Eswatini's High Commission in Pretoria is also cross-accredited to Botswana, Lesotho, Namibia, Zambia and Zimbabwe.

Eswatini is part of the Common Monetary Area, which means the South African Rand circulates along with the Swazi Lilangeni at par in Eswatini.

== History ==
=== Apartheid era ===
During the 1970s and early 1980s, although Swaziland (Eswatini's name before 2018) claimed to be neutral in the Cold War, it was actually pro-Western and maintained strong relations with South Africa, including clandestine cooperation in economic and security matters. South Africa invested heavily in Swaziland's economy, and Swaziland joined the Pretoria-dominated Southern African Customs Union. During the 1980s, some South African businesses also used Swazi territory as a transshipment point in order to circumvent international sanctions on South Africa. Relying on a secret security agreement with South Africa in 1982, Swazi officials harassed African National Congress representatives in the capital, Mbabane, and eventually expelled them from Swaziland. South African security forces, operating undercover, also carried out operations against the ANC on Swazi territory. Throughout this time, part of the Swazi royal family quietly sought the reintegration of Swazi-occupied territory in South Africa into their kingdom. On 27 December 1984, formal relations were established at the trade level. In 1993, they agreed to upgrade formal relations to embassy-level status.

In June 1993, South Africa and Swaziland signed a judicial agreement providing for South African judges, magistrates, and prosecutors to serve in Swaziland's courts. South Africa also agreed to provide training for Swazi court personnel.

=== Post-apartheid era ===
In 1994, the two countries upgraded their diplomatic relations following the election of South African President Nelson Mandela, the end of apartheid in South Africa and South Africa's readmission to the Commonwealth of Nations. In August 1995, the two countries signed an agreement to cooperate in anti-crime and anti-smuggling efforts along their common border. In September 2010, the African National Congress Youth League condemned South Africa's "'illegitimate' relations with 'Swaziland's absolute monarchy." The ANC's investment arm Chancellor House acquired a 75% stake in Swaziland's Maloma Colliery (coal mine). Other political parties condemned the move as well.
