= List of diplomatic missions in Eswatini =

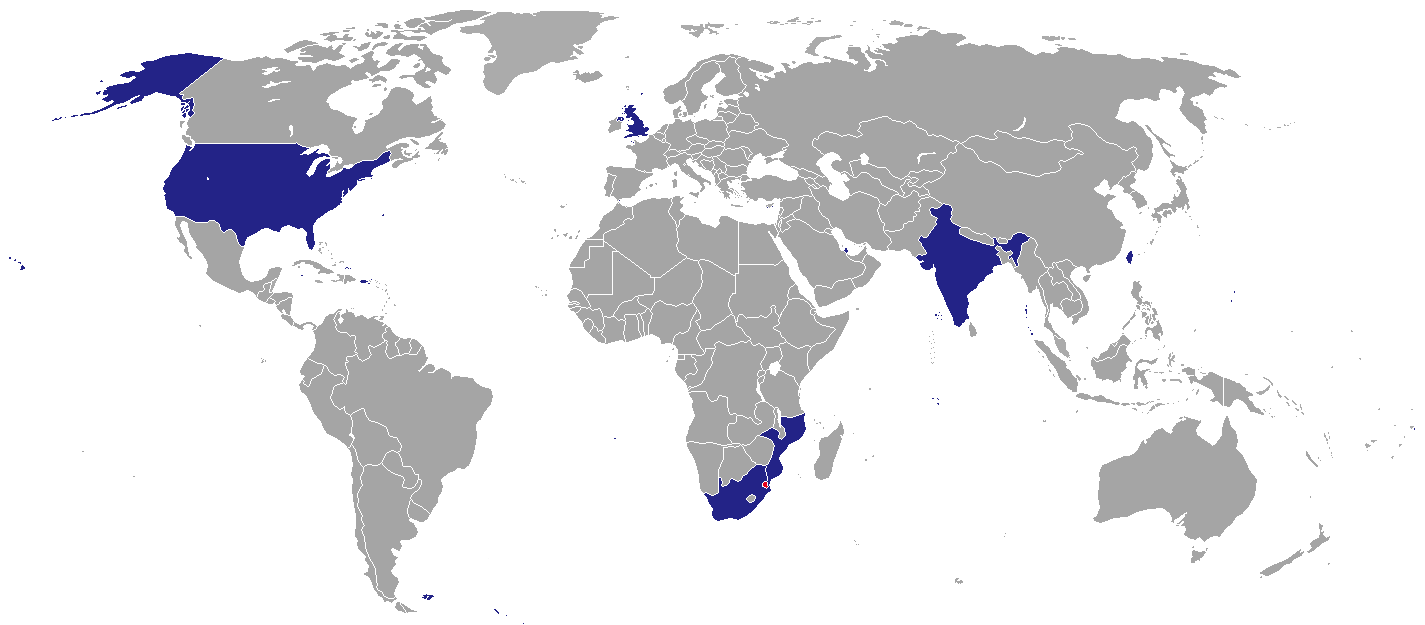
Diplomatic missions in Eswatini

This is a list of diplomatic missions in Eswatini (formerly known as Swaziland). At present, the capital city of Mbabane hosts seven embassies/high commissions.

The Eswati government does not publish a diplomatic list online, so the information on this page has been gathered from various other sources, including foreign ministries online. As such, this listing is incomplete pending official information.

== Embassies/High Commissions in Mbabane ==
1. India
2. Mozambique
3. Qatar
4. Republic of China (Taiwan)
5. South Africa
6. United Kingdom
7. United States

== Other missions or delegations in Mbabane ==
- Germany (Liaison office)

== Gallery ==
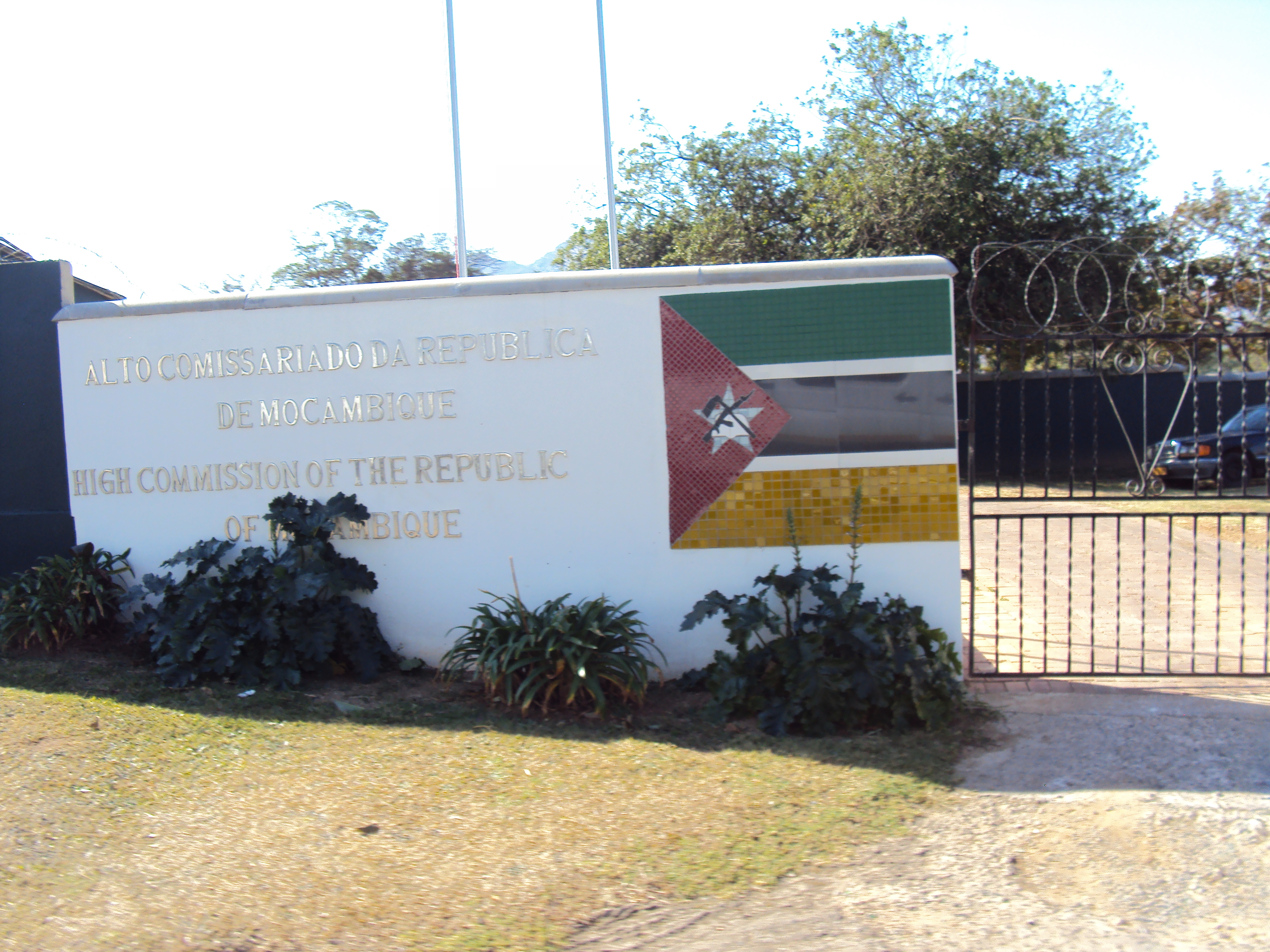
High Commission of Mozambique

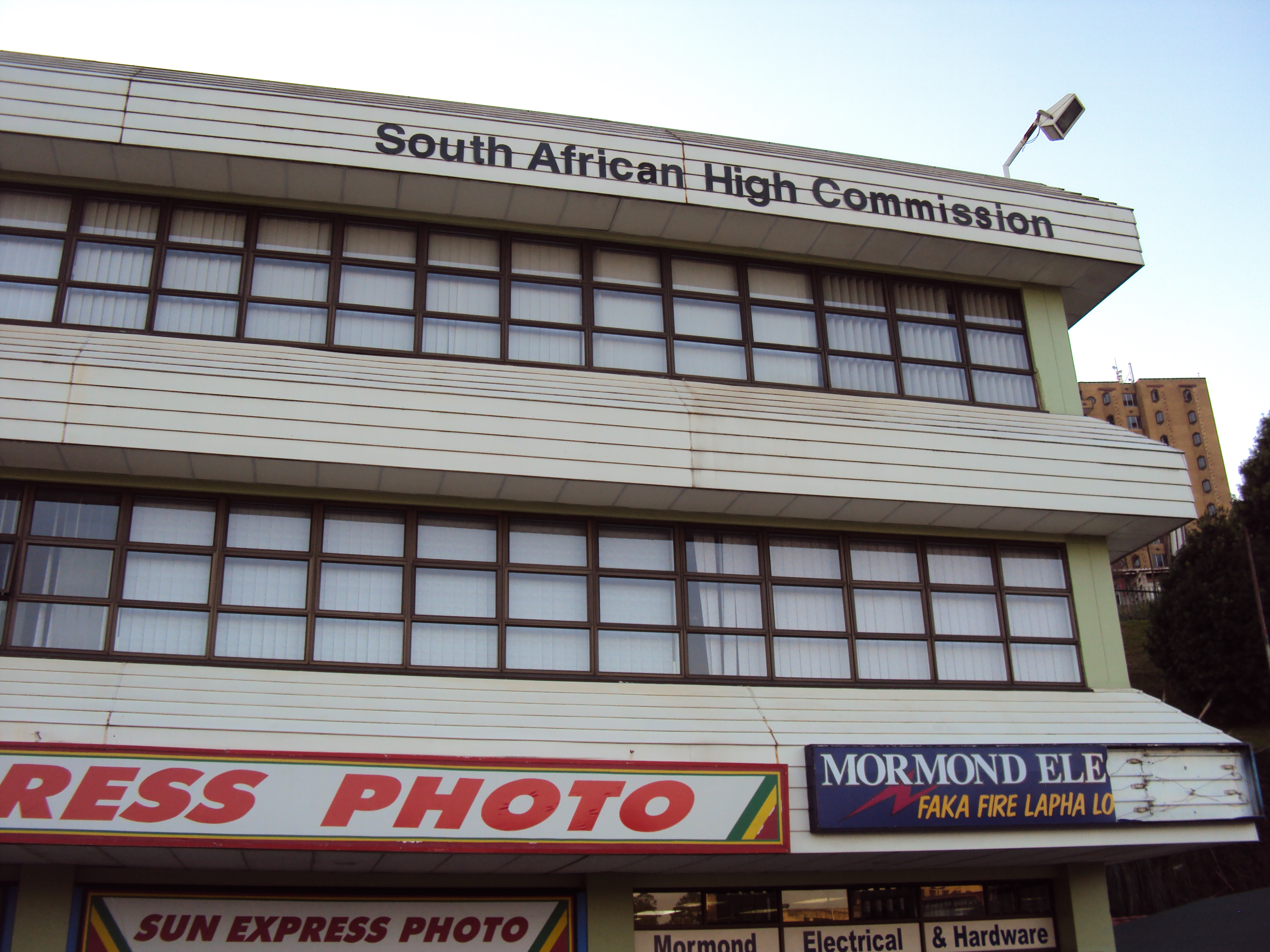
High Commission of South Africa

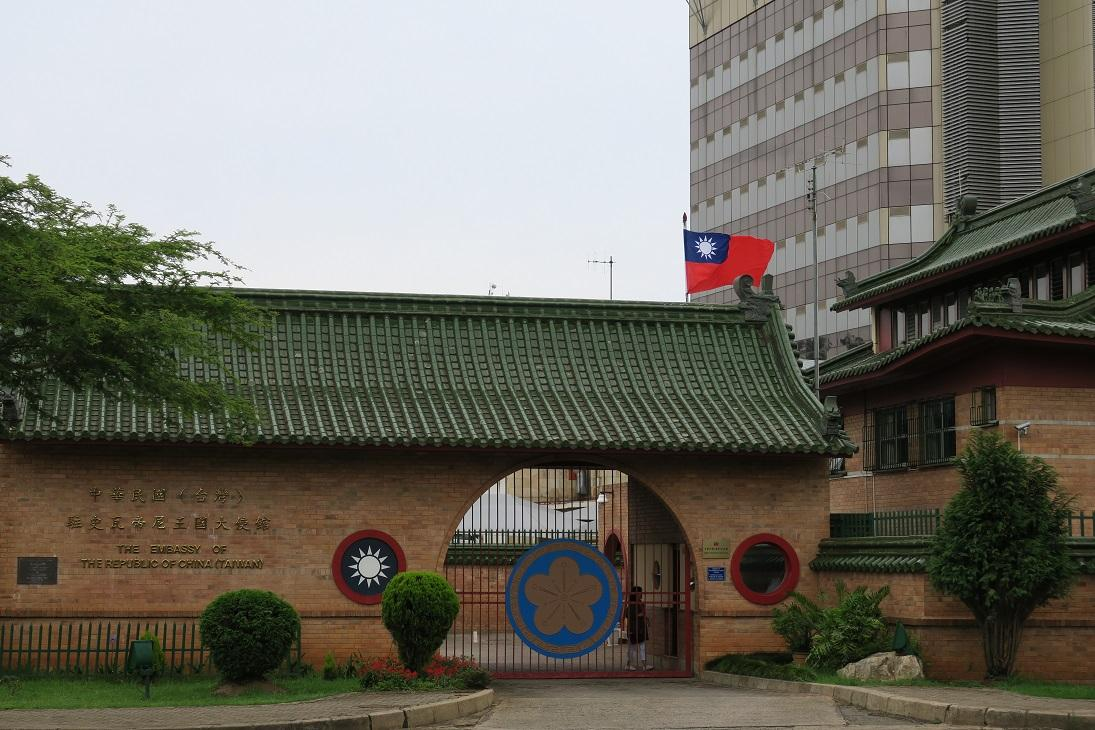
Embassy of the Republic of China (Taiwan)

== Non-resident embassies/high commissions ==
Resident in Pretoria unless otherwise noted

- Algeria (Maputo)
- Argentina
- Australia
- Austria
- Belgium
- Botswana
- Brazil (Maputo)
- Bulgaria
- Burkina Faso
- Cameroon
- Canada (Maputo)
- Croatia
- Cuba
- Cyprus
- Czech Republic
- Denmark
- Egypt (Maputo)
- Finland (Maputo)
- France (Maputo)
- Germany
- Greece
- Holy See
- Hungary
- Indonesia
- Iran
- Ireland (Maputo)
- Israel
- Italy (Maputo)
- Iraq
- Jamaica
- Japan
- Jordan
- Kenya
- Kuwait
- Lesotho
- Libya
- Malaysia
- Mali
- Malta (Valletta)
- Mexico
- Namibia
- Netherlands
- New Zealand
- Norway (Maputo)
- Paraguay
- Portugal (Maputo)
- Poland
- Romania
- Russia
- Saudi Arabia
- Serbia
- Seychelles
- Slovakia
- Somalia
- South Sudan
- Spain (Maputo)
- Sri Lanka
- Sweden (Maputo)
- Switzerland
- Tanzania (Maputo)
- Thailand
- Togo
- Trinidad and Tobago
- United Arab Emirates
- Uganda
- Venezuela (Maputo)
- Vietnam
- Zimbabwe (Maputo)

== Other posts ==
- European Union (Delegation)

== See also ==
- Foreign relations of Eswatini
