= High Commission of Eswatini, London =

High Commission of Eswatini in London
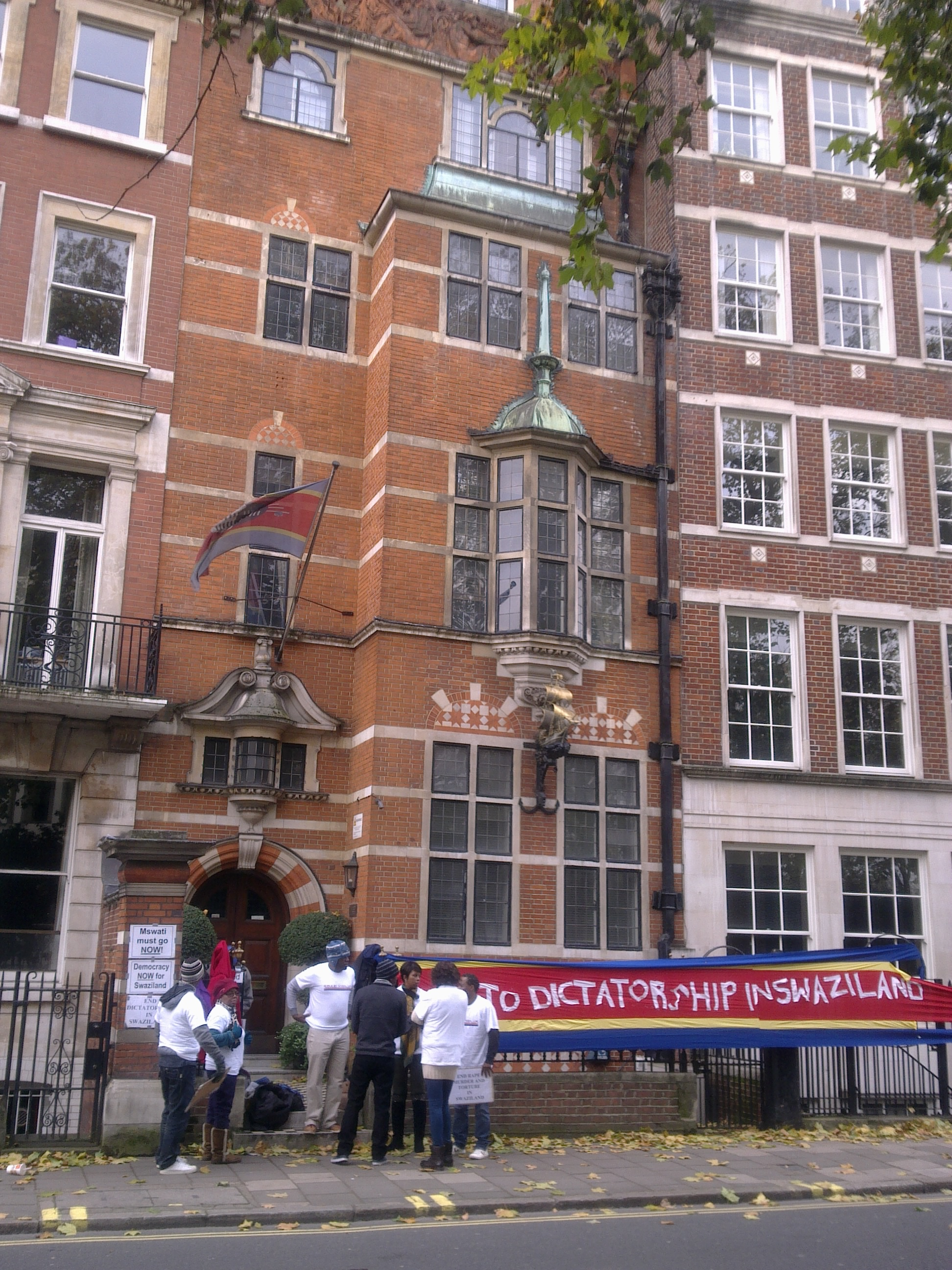
- The High Commission with protesters
- Location: Westminster, London
- Address: 20 Buckingham Gate, London, SW1E 6LB
- Coordinates: 51°29′58.1″N 0°8′23.9″W
- High Commissioner: Dumsile T. Sukati

The High Commission of Eswatini in London is the diplomatic mission of Eswatini in the United Kingdom.

The High Commission is housed in a building designed by Reginald Blomfield in the late 19th century and features sculpture-work by Henry Pegram.

A regular protest has been held since 2010 each Saturday by those opposed to the rule of King Mswati III.
