= Montserrat–United Kingdom relations =

Representative office of Montserrat in London
- Address: 52 Grosvenor Gardens, Victoria, London, SW1W 0AU
- High Commissioner: Janice Panton

Montserrat is an overseas territory of the United Kingdom, and both because of and despite that the UK must have somewhat formal relations.

== Representative office ==
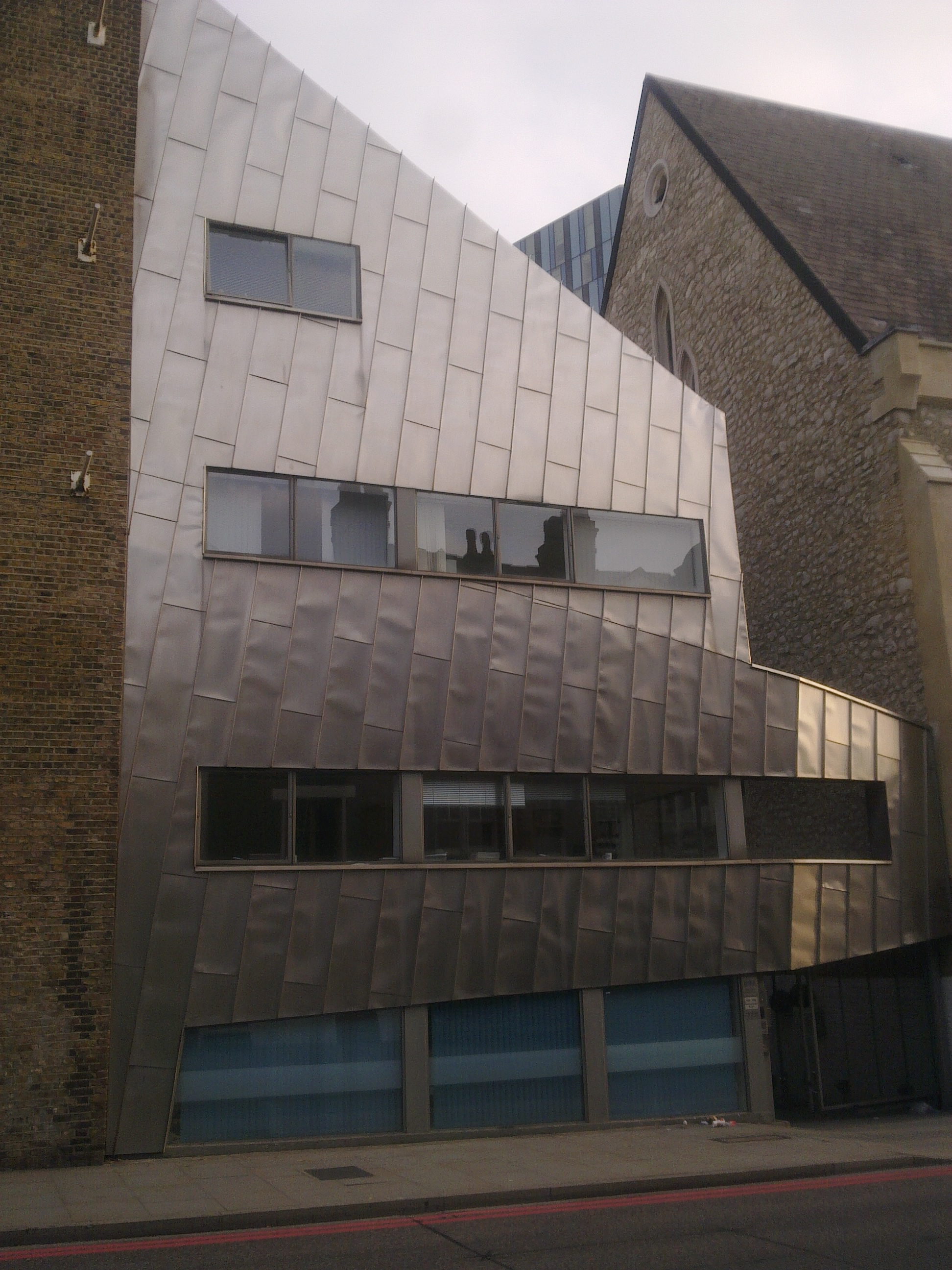
Former location, Kings Cross Business Centre

The Representative Office of Montserrat in London is the diplomatic mission of the British Overseas Territory of Montserrat in the United Kingdom. It is located 52 Grosvenor Gardens, Victoria, London, SW1W 0AU. Previously it was at Kings Cross Business Centre, a multi-use office building in Kings Cross. Unlike for most diplomatic missions, there is no flag or plaque indicating its existence.

The current representative is Janice Panton.
