= Gibraltar–United Kingdom relations =

- Gibraltar: United Kingdom

Gibraltar–United Kingdom relations refer to the historical, political, and diplomatic relationship between the British Overseas Territory of Gibraltar and the United Kingdom of Great Britain and Northern Ireland. The relationship is characterised by close political ties, shared governance structures, and longstanding historical connections that dating back to the early 18th century.

== History ==
The relationship between Gibraltar and the United Kingdom began in 1704 during the War of the Spanish Succession when Anglo-Dutch forces captured the Rock of Gibraltar from Spain. The Treaty of Utrecht, signed in 1713, formally ceded Gibraltar to Great Britain in perpetuity. Since then, Gibraltar has remained under British sovereignty despite ongoing Spanish claims.

Throughout its history, Gibraltar has played a strategically vital role in British military and maritime operations, particularly as a naval base. Its importance was highlighted during the Napoleonic Wars, the First and Second World Wars, and the Cold War. The territory's significance continues in the present day due to its location at the entrance to the Mediterranean Sea.

== Governance and Political Status ==
Gibraltar is classified as a British Overseas Territory and is self-governing in all areas except defence and foreign affairs, which are the responsibility of the United Kingdom. Gibraltar has its own constitution, government, and elected parliament. The UK retains ultimate responsibility for ensuring good governance and external representation.

The relationship has been shaped by repeated affirmations of Gibraltarian self-determination. In referendums held in 1967 and 2002, the people of Gibraltar overwhelmingly rejected proposals for Spanish sovereignty or shared governance with Spain. In 2006, a new constitution was introduced, granting Gibraltar greater autonomy and recognising the right to self-government.

== Defence and Security ==
The United Kingdom is responsible for the defence of Gibraltar. The Ministry of Defence maintains a presence on the territory, including a naval base and military facilities. Gibraltar plays a continuing role in UK and NATO military operations in the Mediterranean and is considered a key asset in regional security.

== Economic and Cultural Ties ==
The UK is Gibraltar’s main trading partner and a significant source of investment and tourism. Gibraltar uses the Gibraltar pound, which is pegged at par with the British pound sterling. The territory benefits from financial and logistical support from the UK, especially in matters related to contingency planning, international representation, and strategic economic policy.

Culturally, Gibraltar maintains strong British influences in education, law, media, and daily life. English is the official language, and institutions are modelled on British systems. At the same time, Gibraltarian identity remains distinct, incorporating Mediterranean and multicultural elements.

== See also ==
- Status of Gibraltar
- Foreign relations of the United Kingdom
