= British Overseas Territories =

Territories under British sovereignty

- Flag
- Anthem: "God Save the King" (Note: "God Save the King" is the national anthem by custom, not statute, and there is no authorised version. Typically, only the first verse is usually sung, although the second verse is also often sung as well at state and public events. The words King, he, him, his, used at present, are replaced by Queen, she, her when the monarch is female.)
- Locations of the United Kingdom and the British Overseas Territories
- Sovereignty: United Kingdom
- Largest territory: British Antarctic Territory (Note: It is recognised by only four other countries and an additional two countries lay claim to land within the territory.)
- Largest city: George Town, Cayman Islands
- Official languages: English
- Demonym(s): British; Briton; multiple local demonyms
- Government: Dependent territories under a constitutional monarchy
  - Monarch: Charles III
  - Prime Minister of the United Kingdom: Andy Burnham
  - Foreign Secretary: Ed Miliband
  - Minister of State for Europe, North America and Overseas Territories: Stewart Wood

Area
  - Total: 18,015 (Note: Excluding the British Antarctic Territory.) km^{2} (6,956 sq mi)

Population
  - 2019 estimate: 272,256
- Date format: dd/mm/yyyy

The British Overseas Territories (BOTs) (Note: Referred to as Crown colonies until 1983, and British Dependent Territories (BODs) from 1983–2002.) are fourteen dependent territories of the United Kingdom (UK) that lie outside the British Islands. These territories are remnants of the former British Empire, which remained under British sovereignty following decolonisation, albeit with varying constitutional statuses. Britain is notably the only country to still have territories in every continent (Note: While the British Antarctic Territory exists, all territorial claims in Antarctica are frozen under the Antarctic Treaty System, which was ratified by the United Kingdom.) on earth, except the continent of Australia.

The permanently inhabited territories exercise varying degrees of internal self-governance, although the UK retains ultimate constitutional oversight, and authority over defence, foreign relations and internal security. Three territories, namely the British Antarctic Territory, South Georgia and the South Sandwich Islands, and the British Indian Ocean Territory, have no permanent civilian population and are staffed primarily by scientific, administrative, or military personnel. The remainder host substantial civilian populations. All fourteen territories recognise the British monarch as head of state and oversight is primarily exercised by the Foreign, Commonwealth and Development Office (FCDO), although they do not form part of the United Kingdom itself. The total land area of all the BOTs is 18,015 km^{2} (6,956 sq mi).

== Population ==
Most of the territories retain permanent civilian populations, with the exceptions of the British Antarctic Territory, South Georgia and the South Sandwich Islands (which host only officials and research station staff), and the British Indian Ocean Territory (used as a military base). Permanent residency for the approximately 7,000 civilians living in the Sovereign Base Areas of Akrotiri and Dhekelia is limited to citizens of Cyprus.

Collectively, the territories encompass a population of about 250,000 people. The two largest territories by population, the Cayman Islands and Bermuda, account for about half of the total BOT population. The Cayman Islands alone comprise 28% of the entire BOT population. At the other end of the scale, three territories have no civilian inhabitants – the Antarctic Territory (currently consisting of five research stations), the British Indian Ocean Territory (whose inhabitants, the Chagossians, were forcibly moved to Mauritius and the United Kingdom between 1968 and 1973), and South Georgia (which actually did have a full-time population of two between 1992 and 2006). The Pitcairn Islands, settled by the survivors of the mutiny on the Bounty, is the smallest settled territory, with 49 inhabitants (all of whom live on the titular island).

== Geography ==
Collectively, the territories encompass a land area of about 480,000 sq nmi (1,600,000 km^{2}). The vast majority of this land area constitutes the almost uninhabited British Antarctic Territory (the land area of all the territories excepting the Antarctic territory is only 18,015 km^{2} [6,956 sq mi]). The smallest by land area is Gibraltar, which lies on the southern tip of the Iberian Peninsula. The United Kingdom participates in the Antarctic Treaty System and, as part of a mutual agreement, the British Antarctic Territory is recognised by four of the six other sovereign nations making claims to Antarctic territory.

== Present overseas territories ==
The 14 British Overseas Territories are:

Flag	Arms	Name	Location	Motto	Area	Population	Capital	Official language(s)	GDP (nominal)	GDP per capita (nominal)	Notes
		Akrotiri and Dhekelia	Cyprus, the eastern Mediterranean Sea		255 km^{2} (98 sq mi)	7,700 (Cypriots; estimate); 8,000 non-permanent (UK military personnel and their families; estimate)	Episkopi Cantonment	English			Disputed sovereignty (UK claims full sovereignty, Cyprus claims partial sovereignty)
		Anguilla	The Lesser Antilles of the Caribbean, The North Atlantic Ocean	"Unity, Strength and Endurance"	91 km^{2} (35.1 sq mi)	16,293 (2025 estimate)	The Valley	English	$299 million	$20,307	
		Bermuda	The North Atlantic Ocean between Cape Sable Island of Canada, Cape Hatteras of its nearest neighbour, the US, the Caribbean (all to the west), and the Azores (to the east).	"Quo fata ferunt" (Latin; "Whither the Fates carry [us]")	54 km^{2} (20.8 sq mi)	63,680 (2026 estimate)	Hamilton	English	$6.464 billion	$102,987	The oldest territory, accidentally settled by the Virginia Company in 1609 and officially added to its Royal Charter in 1612. The House of Assembly of Bermuda held its first session in 1612.
		British Antarctic Territory	Antarctica	"Research and Discovery"	1,709,400 km^{2} (660,000 sq mi)	0; 50 non-permanent in winter, over 400 in summer (research personnel)	Rothera (main base)	English			Subject to the Antarctic Treaty System.
		British Indian Ocean Territory	The central Indian Ocean	"In tutela nostra Limuria" (Latin; "Limuria is in our charge")	60 km^{2} (23 sq mi)	6 (disputed) (Note: In 2026, six Chagossians returned to Île du Coin in an attempt to reestablish a permanent settlement, without seeking government permission; their effort is being challenged in court. The BIOT Supreme Court ruled that the Chagossians had the right to live on the island, but the BIOT administration is appealing the ruling.); 3,000 non-permanent (UK and US military and staff personnel; estimate)	Naval Support Facility Diego Garcia (integrated military base)	English			Includes seven atolls of the Chagos Archipelago and the island of Diego Garcia. Claimed by Mauritius, with which an agreement to handover sovereignty was finalised in May 2025. This agreement is pending ratification.
		British Virgin Islands	The Lesser Antilles of the Caribbean, The North Atlantic Ocean	"Vigilate" (Latin; "Be watchful")	153 km^{2} (59 sq mi)	38,984 (2024 estimate)	Road Town	English	$1.05 billion	$48,511	Tortola, Virgin Gorda, Anegada, Jost Van Dyke
		Cayman Islands	The Greater Antilles of the Caribbean	"He hath founded it upon the seas"	264 km^{2} (101.9 sq mi)	90,577 (2025 estimate)	George Town	English	$4.298 billion	$85,474	Grand Cayman, Cayman Brac and Little Cayman
		Falkland Islands	The Patagonian Shelf of The South Atlantic Ocean	"Desire the right"	12,173 km^{2} (4,700 sq mi)	3,662 (2021 census); 1,350 non-permanent (UK military personnel; 2012 estimate)	Stanley	English	$164.5 million	$70,800	A tight archipelago of East Falkland, West Falkland, and over 700 other islands. Claimed by Argentina as the Malvinas and in the Falklands War of 1982, Argentinian forces invaded and briefly occupied the islands.
		Gibraltar	Iberian Peninsula, Continental Europe at the Straits of Gibraltar / Pillars of Hercules	"Nulli expugnabilis hosti" (Latin; "No enemy shall expel us")	6.5 km^{2} (2.5 sq mi)	37,936 (2022 census); 1,250 non-permanent (UK military personnel; 2012 estimate)	Gibraltar	English	$3.08 billion	$92,843	Main article: Gibraltar–United Kingdom relations Claimed by Spain.
		Montserrat	The Lesser Antilles of the Caribbean, The North Atlantic Ocean	"A people of excellence, moulded by nature, nurtured by God"	101 km^{2} (39 sq mi)	4,396 (2023 census)	Plymouth (de jure, but abandoned due to Soufrière Hills volcanic eruption. De facto capital is Brades)	English	$61 million	$12,181	Main article: Montserrat–United Kingdom relations
		Pitcairn Islands	The South Pacific Ocean		47 km^{2} (18 sq mi)	35 (2023 estimate); 6 non-permanent (2014 estimate)	Adamstown	English, Pitkern	$144,715	$2,894	A small archipelago of the Isles of Pitcairn, Henderson, Ducie and Oeno
		Saint Helena, Ascension and Tristan da Cunha, including:	The Mid-Atlantic Ridge of the South Atlantic Ocean		420 km^{2} (162 sq mi)	5,633 (total; 2016 census)	Jamestown	English	$55.7 million	$12,230	Highly separated sea-mounts running 3,642 kilometres (2,263 mi) from equatorial Ascension Island to the small archipelago of Tristan da Cunha, having a three main islands – with Gough and Inaccessible Islands – and three uninhabited minor Nightingale isles, these are SW of Cape Town. St Helena is about 1,300 kilometres (810 mi) SE of Ascension.
		Saint Helena		"Loyal and Unshakeable" (Saint Helena)		3,980 (Saint Helena; June 2025 estimate)		English			Highly separated sea-mounts running 3,642 kilometres (2,263 mi) from equatorial Ascension Island to the small archipelago of Tristan da Cunha, having a three main islands – with Gough and Inaccessible Islands – and three uninhabited minor Nightingale isles, these are SW of Cape Town. St Helena is about 1,300 kilometres (810 mi) SE of Ascension.
		Ascension Island				806 (Ascension; 2016 census); 1,000 non-permanent (Ascension; UK military personnel; estimate)		English			Highly separated sea-mounts running 3,642 kilometres (2,263 mi) from equatorial Ascension Island to the small archipelago of Tristan da Cunha, having a three main islands – with Gough and Inaccessible Islands – and three uninhabited minor Nightingale isles, these are SW of Cape Town. St Helena is about 1,300 kilometres (810 mi) SE of Ascension.
		Tristan da Cunha		"Our faith is our strength" (Tristan da Cunha)		221 (Tristan da Cunha; 2016 census); 9 non-permanent (Tristan da Cunha; weather personnel)		English			Highly separated sea-mounts running 3,642 kilometres (2,263 mi) from equatorial Ascension Island to the small archipelago of Tristan da Cunha, having a three main islands – with Gough and Inaccessible Islands – and three uninhabited minor Nightingale isles, these are SW of Cape Town. St Helena is about 1,300 kilometres (810 mi) SE of Ascension.
		South Georgia and the South Sandwich Islands	The South Atlantic Ocean, bordering the Southern Ocean at 60° S latitude and within the Antarctic Convergence, on the edge of the Patagonian Shelf about 1,300 kilometres (810 mi) ESE of the Falkland Islands	"Leo terram propriam protegat" (Latin; "Let the lion protect his own land")	3,903 km^{2} (1,507 sq mi)	0; 99 non-permanent (officials and research personnel)	King Edward Point	English			A loose archipelago of South Georgia with the Scotia Arc chain of smaller isles, known as the South Sandwich Islands. Originally used as a whaling station, but now for just Antarctic research. Claimed by Argentina, these islands were occupied by Argentinian forces during the Falklands War in 1982.
		Turks and Caicos Islands	South-eastern of section of the Lucayan Archipelago — the other isles being the Bahamas — in North Atlantic Ocean	"Beautiful by nature"	948 km^{2} (366 sq mi)	52,299 (2025 estimate)	Cockburn Town	English	$1.077 billion	£28,589	Includes Grand Turk Island
Overall					c. 1,727,415 km^{2} (18,105 km^{2} excl. BAT)	c. 272,256			c. $16.55 billion		

=== Map ===
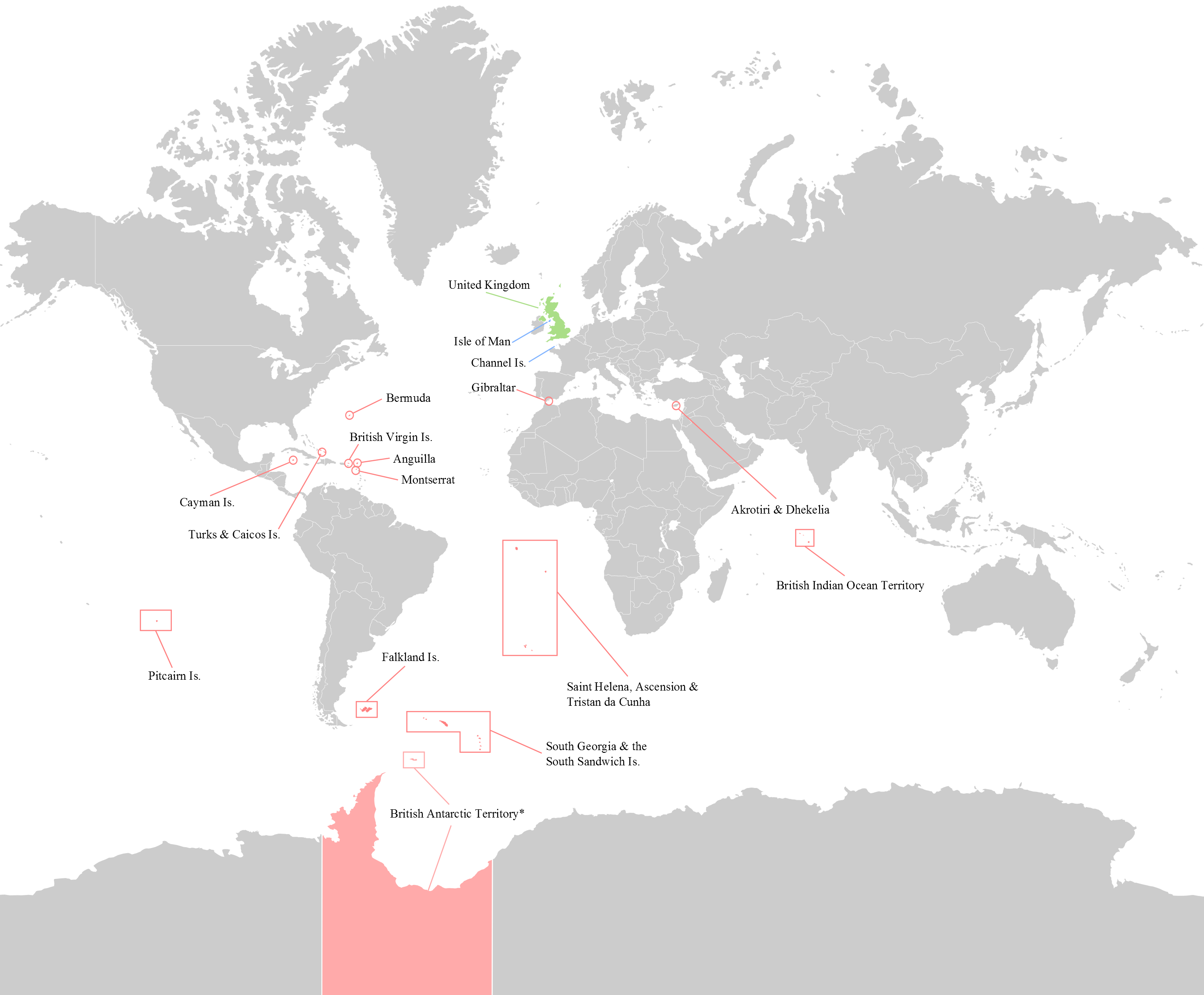
British Overseas Territories United Kingdom Crown Dependencies

=== Photo gallery ===
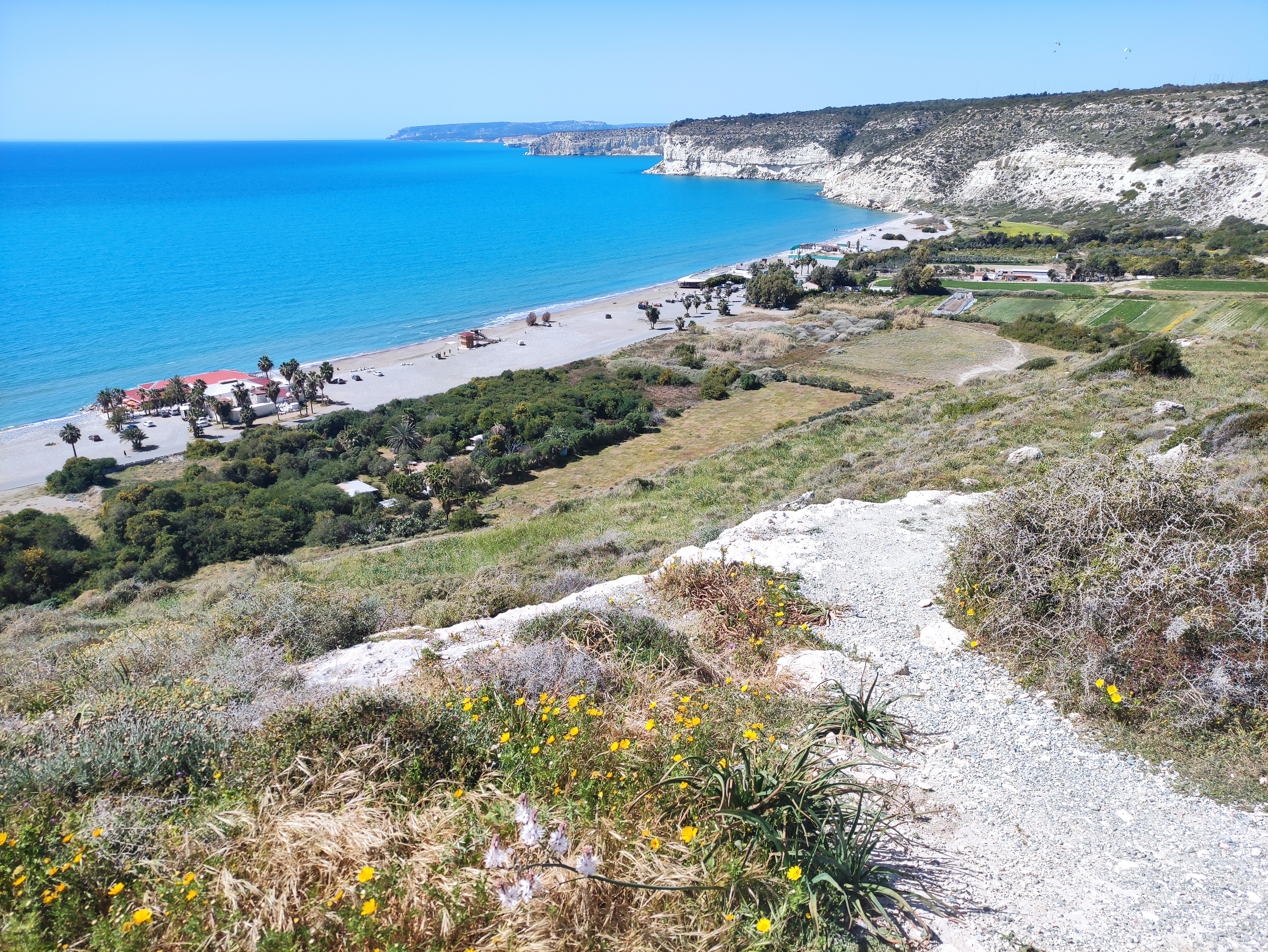
Akrotiri and Dhekelia

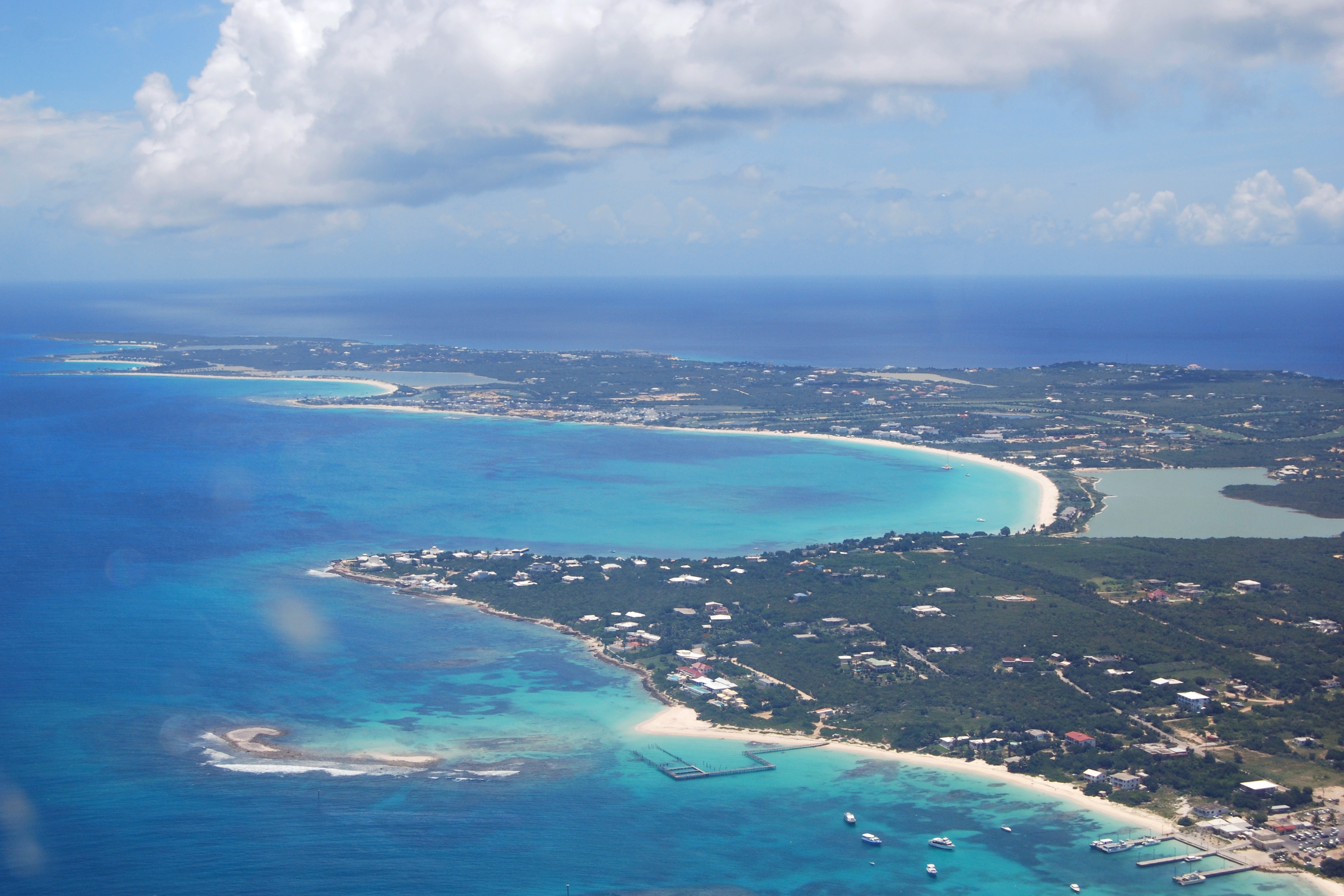
Anguilla

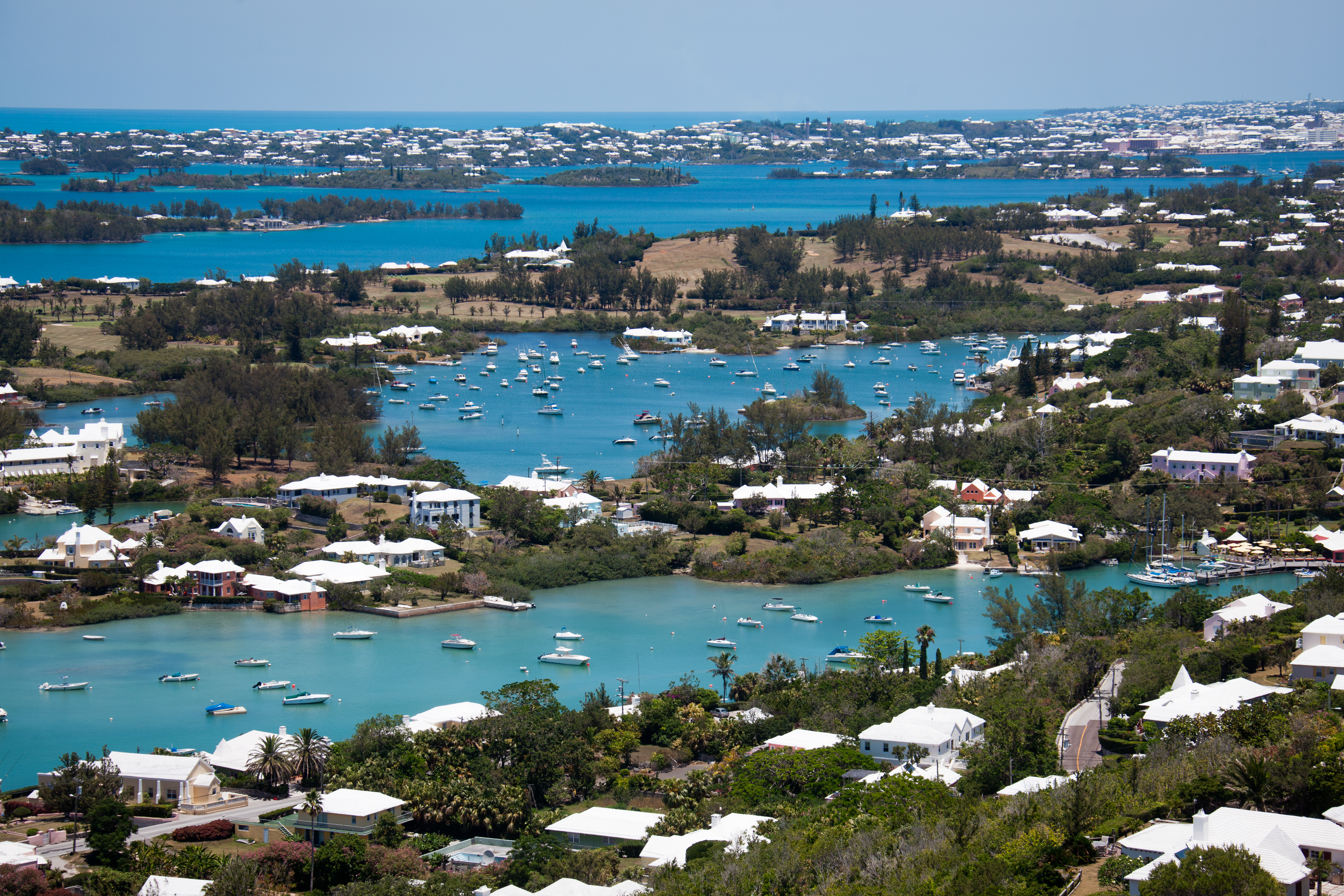
Bermuda

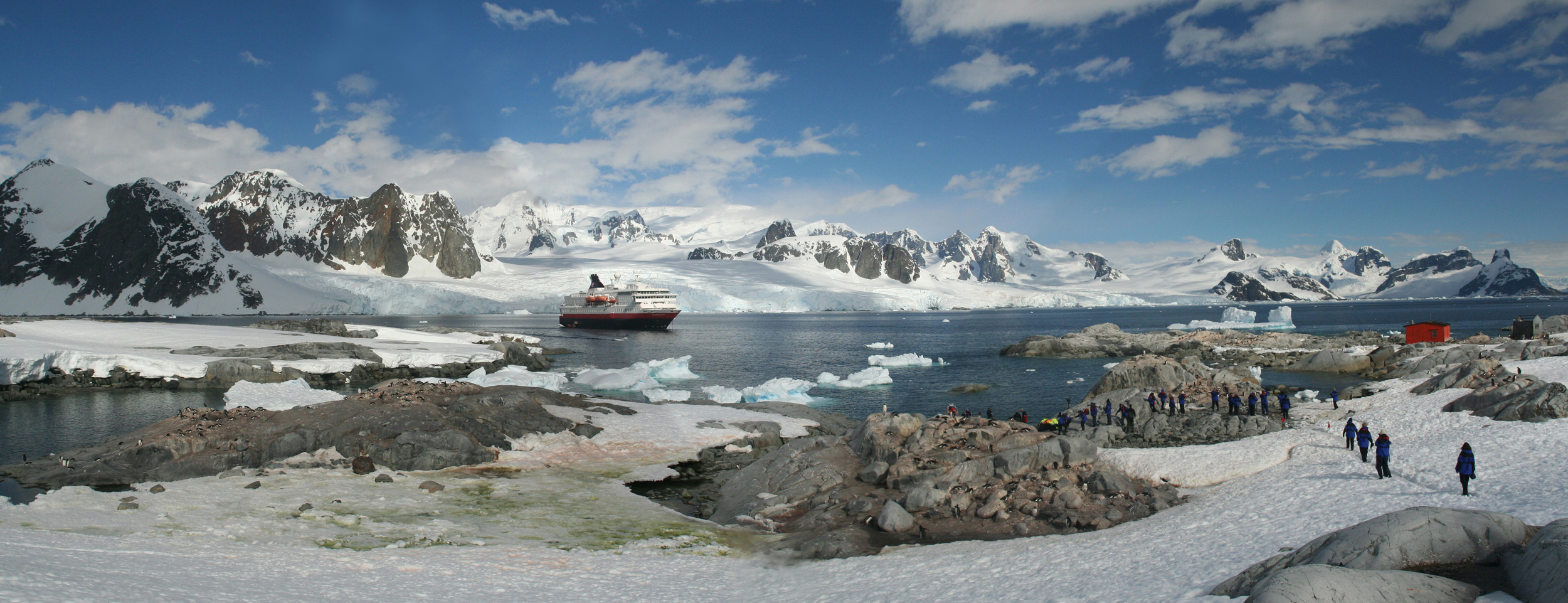
British Antarctic Territory

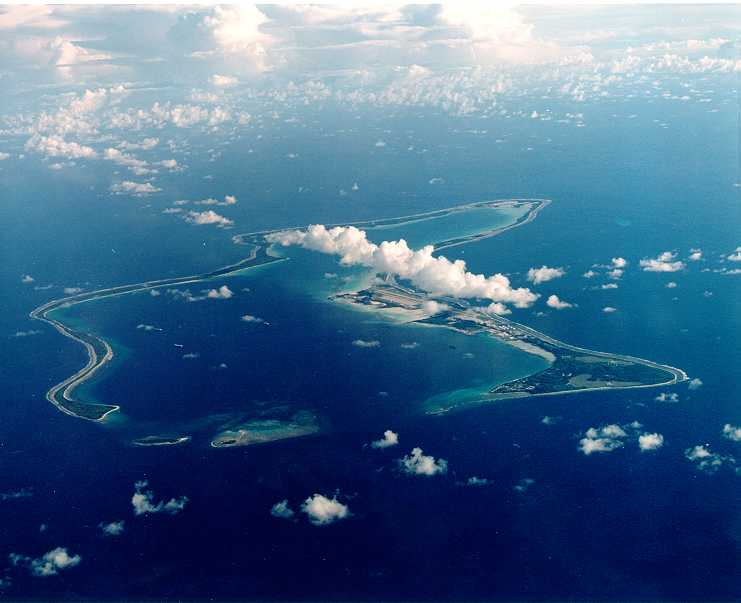
British Indian Ocean Territory

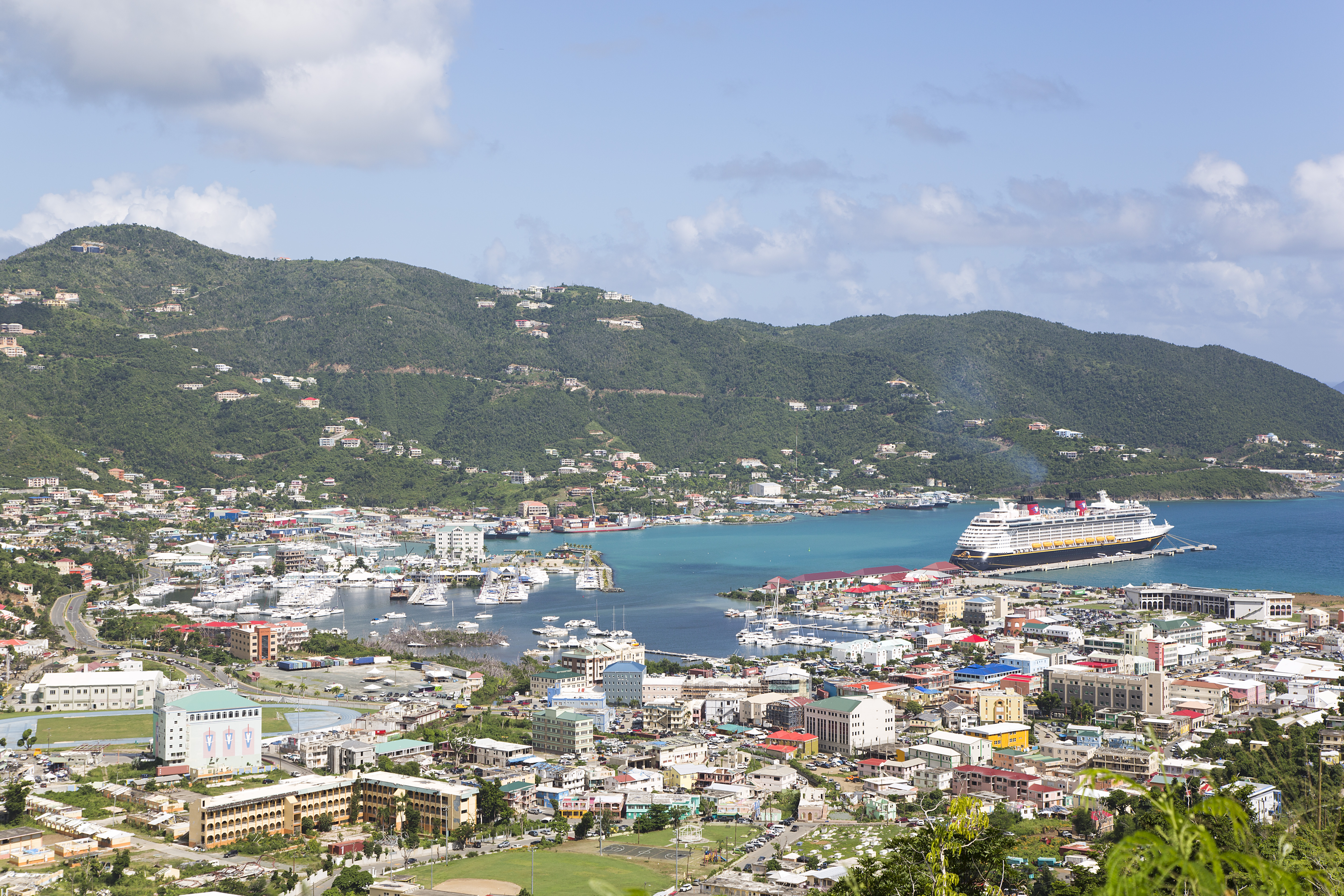
British Virgin Islands

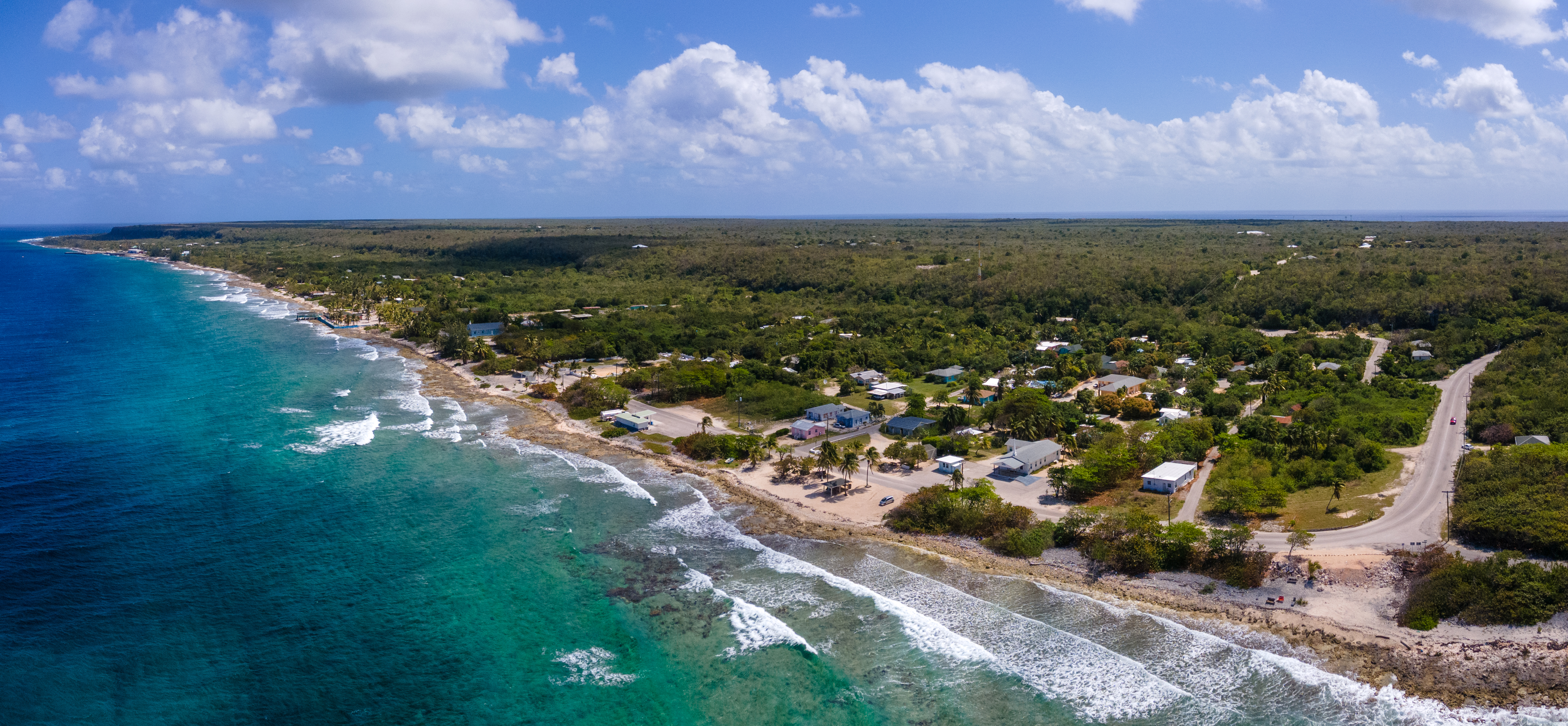
Cayman Islands

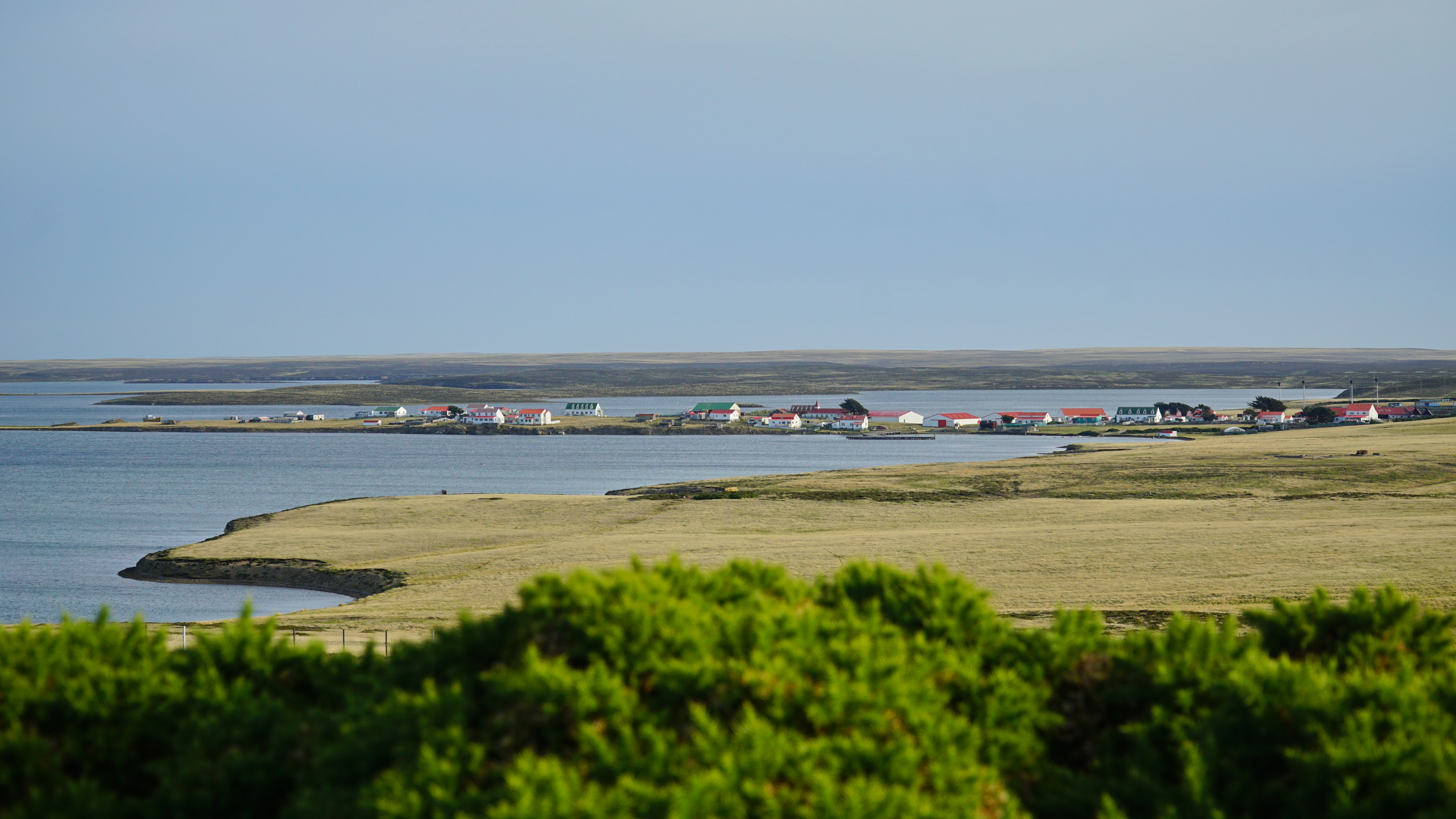
Falkland Islands

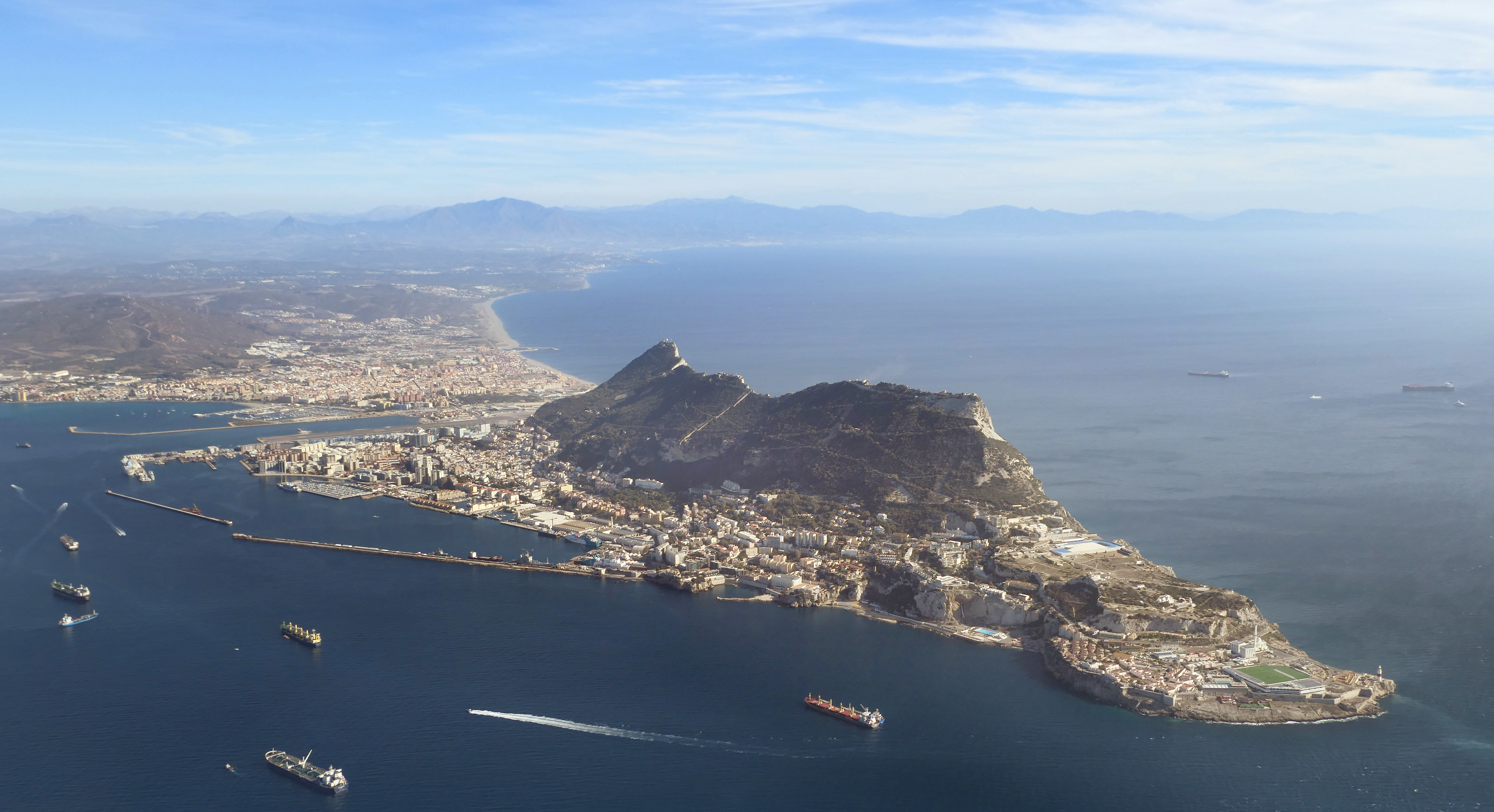
Gibraltar

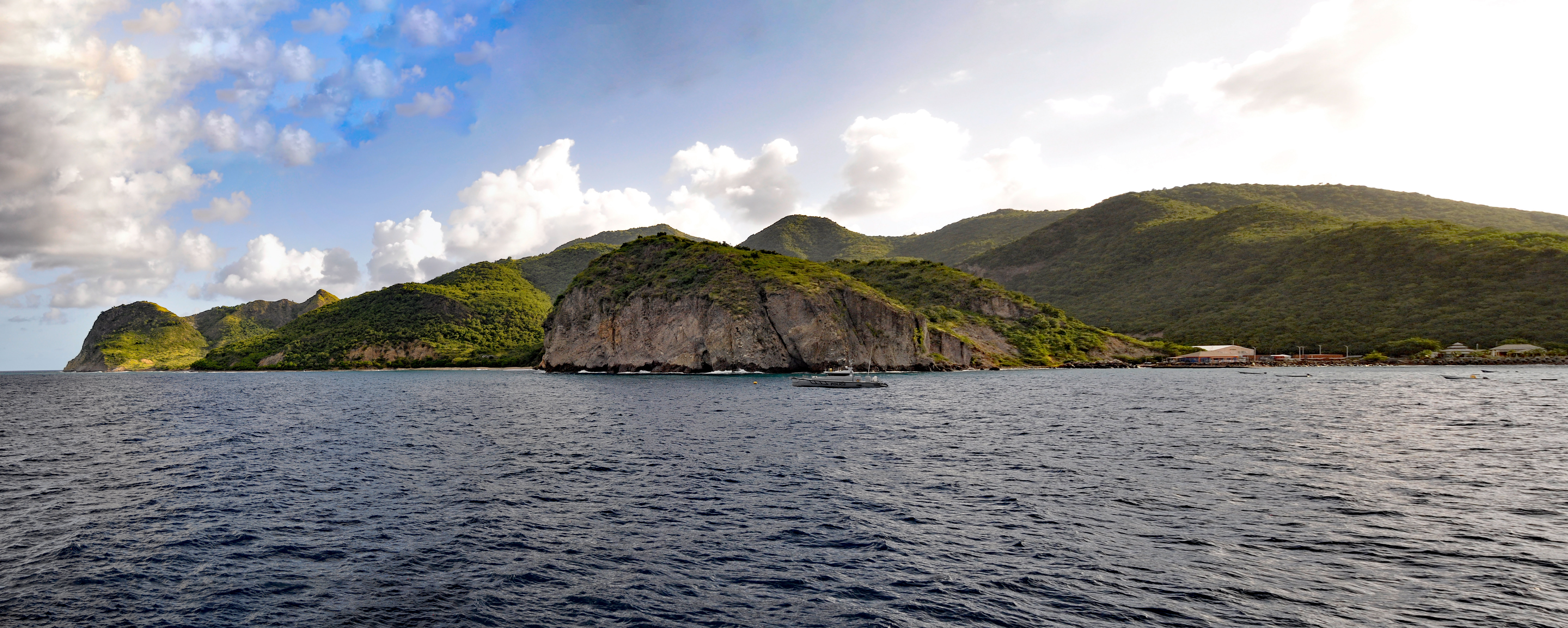
Montserrat

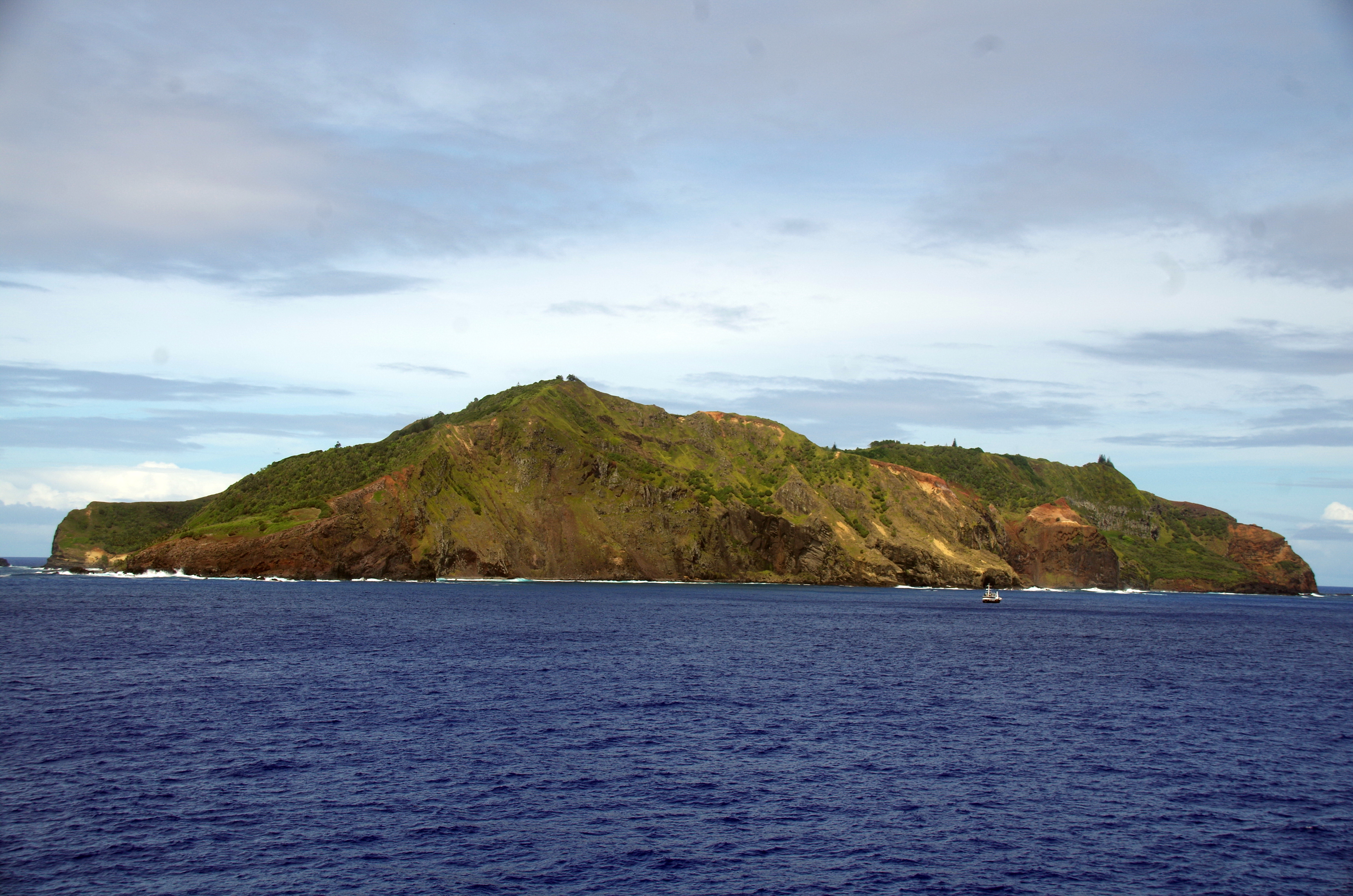
Pitcairn Islands

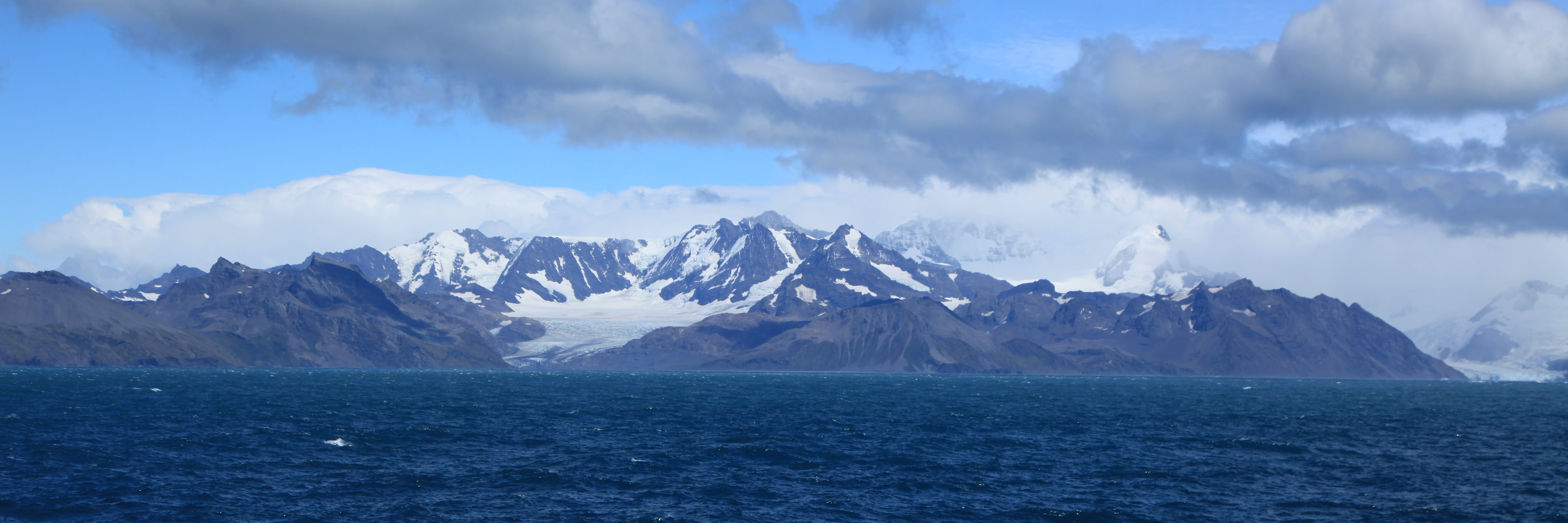
South Georgia and the South Sandwich Islands

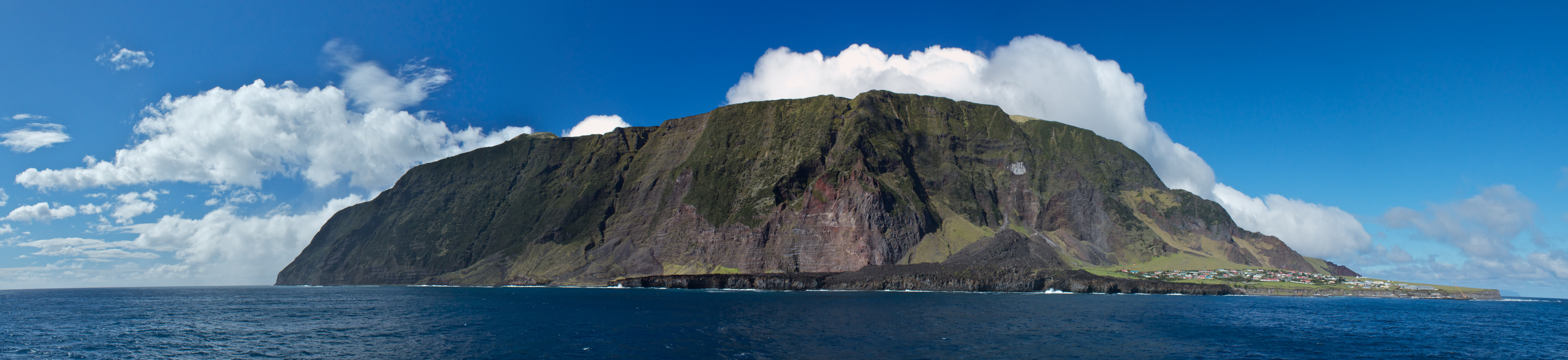
Tristan da Cunha (Saint Helena, Ascension and Tristan da Cunha)

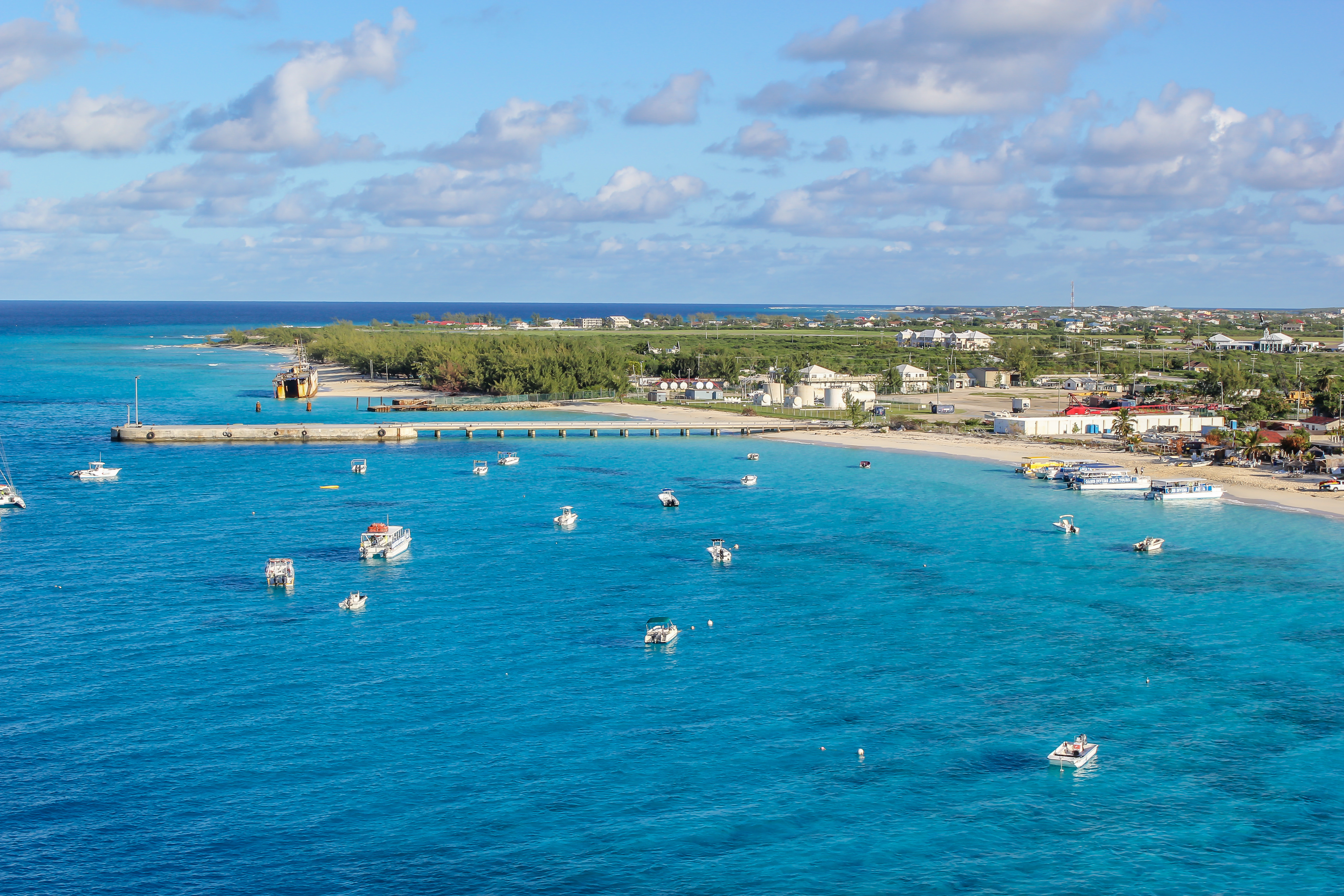
Turks and Caicos Islands

== History ==
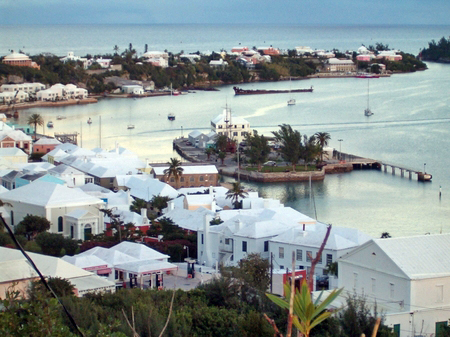
St. George's town (originally named New London), in the Islands of Bermuda, or "The Somers Isles". The colony was founded by the wrecking of the flagship of the Virginia Company in 1609. The company's charter was extended to include Bermuda in 1612, and it has remained an English (since 1707, British) colony ever since. Since the rebellion of Virginia, it has been the oldest-remaining British colony, and the town of St. George's is the oldest continuously inhabited British settlement in the New World.

Early colonies, in the sense of English subjects residing in lands hitherto outside the control of the English government, were generally known as plantations. The first, unofficial, colony was Newfoundland Colony, where English fishermen routinely set up seasonal camps in the 16th century. It is now a province of Canada known as Newfoundland and Labrador.

After failed attempts, including the Roanoke Colony, the permanent English colonisation of North America began officially in 1607 with the settlement of Jamestown, the first successful permanent colony in Virginia (a term that was then applied generally to North America). Its offshoot, Bermuda, was settled inadvertently after the wrecking of the Virginia Company's flagship there in 1609, with the company's charter extended to officially include the archipelago in 1612. St. George's town, founded in Bermuda in that year, remains the oldest continuously inhabited British settlement in the New World (with some historians stating that – its formation predating the 1619 conversion of James Fort into Jamestown – St. George's was actually the first successful town the English established in the New World). Bermuda and Bermudians have played important, sometimes pivotal, but generally underestimated or unacknowledged roles in the shaping of the English and British transatlantic empires. These include maritime commerce, settlement of the continent and of the West Indies, the projection of naval power via the colony's privateers, and its role after the independence of the thirteen colonies that became the United States of America as an Imperial fortress, among other areas.

The growth of the British Empire in the 19th century, to its territorial peak in the 1920s, saw Britain acquire nearly one quarter of the world's land mass, including territories with large indigenous populations in Asia and Africa. From the middle of the 19th century to the early 20th century, the larger settler colonies – in Canada, Australia, New Zealand and South Africa – first became self-governing colonies and then achieved independence in all matters except foreign policy, defence and trade. Separate self-governing colonies federated to become Canada (in 1867), Australia (in 1901), South Africa (in 1910) and Rhodesia (in 1965). These and other large self-governing colonies had by the 1920s become known as dominions. The dominions achieved almost full independence with the Statute of Westminster (1931).

Five of the overseas territories are in the Caribbean, as shown on the map.

Through a process of decolonisation following the Second World War, most of the British colonies in Africa, Asia and the Caribbean chose independence. Some colonies became Commonwealth realms, retaining the monarch as their own head of state. Most former colonies and protectorates became member states of the Commonwealth of Nations, a non-political, voluntary association of equal members, comprising a population of around 2.2 billion people.

After the independence of Southern Rhodesia (now Zimbabwe) in Africa in 1980 and British Honduras (now Belize) in Central America in 1981, the last major colony that remained was Hong Kong, with a population of over 5 million. With 1997 approaching, the United Kingdom and China negotiated the Sino-British Joint Declaration, which led to the whole of Hong Kong becoming a special administrative region of China in 1997, subject to various conditions intended to guarantee the preservation of Hong Kong's capitalist economy and its way of life under British rule for at least 50 years after the handover. George Town, Cayman Islands, has consequently become the largest city among the dependent territories, partly because of the constant and healthy flow of immigration to the city and the territory as a whole, which saw its population jump 26% from 2010 to 2021, the fastest population growth of any of the territories.

Before 1 January 1983, the territories were officially referred to as the Crown Colonies. At that time, they were renamed British Dependent Territories. In 2002, the British Parliament passed the British Overseas Territories Act 2002, which introduced the current name of British Overseas Territories. This reclassified the UK's dependent territories as overseas territories and, except for those people solely connected with the Sovereign Base Areas on Cyprus, restored full British citizenship to their inhabitants.

During the European Union (EU) membership of the United Kingdom, the main body of EU law did not apply and, although certain slices of EU law were applied to the overseas territories as part of the EU's Association of Overseas Countries and Territories (OCT Association), they were not commonly enforceable in local courts. The OCT Association also provided overseas territories with structural funding for regeneration projects. Gibraltar was the only overseas territory that was part of the EU, although it was not part of the European Customs Union, the European Tax Policy, the European Statistics Zone or the Common Agriculture Policy. Gibraltar was not a member of the EU in its own right; it received representation in the European Parliament through its being part of the South West England constituency. Overseas citizens held concurrent European Union citizenship, giving them rights of free movement across all EU member states. The Sovereign Base Areas in Cyprus were never part of the EU, but they are the only British Overseas Territory to use the Euro as official currency, having previously had the Cypriot pound as their currency until 1 January 2008.

On 15 May 2023, the sixteen heraldic shields of the British Overseas Territories and the three coat of arms of the Crown Dependencies were "immortalised" in two new stained-glass windows, unveiled in the Speaker's House at the New Palace of Westminster. Speaker of the House of Commons, Sir Lindsay Hoyle said "The two windows represent part of our United Kingdom family".

Following the Chagos Archipelago handover agreement, the UK government is also due to introduce legislation to implement the agreement, including amending the British Nationality Act 1981 to reflect that the British Indian Ocean Territory is no longer an overseas territory following Parliament's ratification of the treaty.

== Government ==
=== Head of state ===
The head of state in the overseas territories is the British monarch, currently King Charles III. The monarch appoints a representative in each territory to exercise the executive power of the monarch. In territories with a permanent population, a governor is appointed by the monarch on the advice of the British government. Currently (2019), all but two governors are either career diplomats or have worked in other civil service departments. The remaining two governors are former members of the British armed forces. In territories without a permanent population, a commissioner is usually appointed to represent the monarch. Exceptionally, in the overseas territories of Saint Helena, Ascension, Tristan da Cunha and the Pitcairn Islands, an administrator is appointed to be the governor's representative. In the territory of Saint Helena, Ascension and Tristan da Cunha, there is an administrator in each of the two distant parts of the territory, namely Ascension Island and Tristan da Cunha. The administrator of the Pitcairn Islands resides on Pitcairn, with the governor based in New Zealand.

Following the Lords' decision in Ex parte Quark, 2005, it is held that the King, in exercising his authority over British Overseas Territories, does not act on the advice of the government of the UK, but in his role as King of each territory, except fulfilling the UK's international responsibilities for its territories. The reserve powers of the Crown for each territory are no longer considered to be exercisable on the advice of the UK government. To comply with the court's decision, the territorial governors now act on the advice of each territory's executive, and the UK government can no longer disallow legislation passed by territorial legislatures. The role of the governor is to act as the de facto head of state, and they are usually responsible for appointing the head of government, and senior political positions in the territory. The governor is also responsible for liaising with the UK government and carrying out any ceremonial duties. A commissioner has the same powers as a governor, but also acts as the head of government.

=== Local government ===
Although the British Government is the national government, most governance within the territories has been delegated locally, as all territories bearing a permanent population have some form of representative body that holds responsibility for local legislation (the only exception having been British Hong Kong). All Britons living in an overseas territory have irrevocable guarantees of the same rights they would have if born in England, except for representation in the national Parliament of the United Kingdom. The structure of each territorial government mostly parallels the size and political development of the territory.

Territories	Government
British Antarctic Territory; South Georgia and the South Sandwich Islands	There is no native or permanent population; therefore, there is no elected government. The commissioner, supported by an administrator, runs the affairs of the territory.
British Indian Ocean Territory	There is no recognised elected government or governor, as there is no official native settled population. There is a BIOT Commissioner, appointed by the Foreign Office in London, to run the affairs of the territory. The Chagossians – who were forcibly evicted from the territory in 1971 – won a High Court judgement allowing them to return, but this was then overridden by an Order in Council preventing them from returning. The final appeal to the House of Lords (regarding the lawfulness of the Order in Council) was decided in the government's favour, exhausting the islanders' legal options in the United Kingdom at present. In 2025, members of the Chagossian community elected Misley Mandarin as First Minister of the Chagossian Government in Exile, who in 2026 along with a small group, including some born on the islands prior to eviction, landed at Île du Coin to attempt to establish a permanent civilian settlement. They have not been officially recognised by the Government of the BIOT who served an eviction notice.
Akrotiri and Dhekelia	There is no elected government. The Commander British Forces Cyprus acts as the territory's administrator, with a chief officer responsible for the day-to-day running of the civil government. As far as possible, laws are converged with those of the Republic of Cyprus.
Pitcairn Islands	There are an elected mayor and Island Council, who have the power to propose and administer local legislation. However, their decisions are subject to approval by the governor, who retains near-unlimited powers of plenary legislation on behalf of the United Kingdom government.
Falkland Islands	The government consists of an elected Legislative Assembly, with the chief executive and the director of corporate resources as ex officio members.
Saint Helena, Ascension and Tristan da Cunha	The government consists of an elected Legislative Council. The governor is the head of government and leads the Executive Council, consisting of appointed members made up from the Legislative Council and two ex-officio members. Governance on Ascension Island and Tristan da Cunha is led by administrators who are advised by elected Island Councils.
Anguilla; British Virgin Islands; Montserrat	These territories have a House of Assembly, Legislative Assembly (Montserrat), with political parties. The Executive Council is usually called a cabinet and is led by a premier, who is the leader of the majority party in parliament. The governor exercises less power over local affairs and deals mostly with foreign affairs and economic issues, while the elected government controls most "domestic" concerns.
Cayman Islands	The Cayman Islands has a unicameral legislature with multiple political parties. On 11 November 2020, constitutional reforms were approved, which would reintroduce the islands' Governmental body as the Parliament of the Cayman Islands. Other changes include giving the territory more autonomy and reducing the power of the Governor.
Gibraltar	Under the Gibraltar Constitution Order 2006 which was approved in Gibraltar by a referendum, Gibraltar now has a Parliament. The Government of Gibraltar, headed by the chief minister, is elected. Defence, external affairs and internal security are vested in the governor.
Bermuda	Bermuda, settled in 1609 and self-governed since 1620, is the oldest of the Overseas Territories. The bicameral Parliament consists of a Senate and a House of Assembly, and most executive powers have been delegated to the head of government, known as the premier.
Turks and Caicos Islands	The Turks and Caicos Islands adopted a new constitution effective 9 August 2006; their head of government now also has the title Premier, their legislature is called the House of Assembly, and their autonomy has been greatly increased.

=== Legal system ===
Each overseas territory has its own legal system independent of the United Kingdom. The legal system is generally based on English common law, with some distinctions for local circumstances. Each territory has its own attorney general and court system. For the smaller territories, the United Kingdom may appoint a UK-based lawyer or judge to work on legal cases. This is particularly important for cases involving serious crimes and where it is impossible to find a jury who will not know the defendant in a small population island. Whilst many are geographically remote, the British Overseas Territories share a direct connection with elements of supervisory governance (as did the now independent Commonwealth Nations) still exercisable by the UK's Government in London, UK.

The 2004 Pitcairn Islands sexual assault trial is an example of how the United Kingdom may choose to provide the legal framework for particular cases where the territory cannot do so alone. The highest court for all the British Overseas Territories is the Judicial Committee of the Privy Council in London.

=== Law enforcement ===
The British Overseas Territories generally look after their own policing matters and have their own police forces. In smaller territories, the senior officer(s) may be recruited or seconded from a UK law enforcement agency, and specialist staff and equipment may be sent to assist the local force. Some territories may have other forces beyond the main territorial police, for instance, an airport police, such as Airport Security Police (Bermuda), or a defence police force, such as the Gibraltar Defence Police. In addition, most territories have customs, immigration, border and coastguard agencies. Territories with military bases or responsibilities may also have "Overseas Service Police", members of the British or Commonwealth Armed Forces.

=== Joint Ministerial Council ===
A Joint Ministerial Council of UK ministers and the leaders of the overseas territories has been held annually since 2012 to provide representation between UK government departments and overseas territory governments.

== Disputed sovereignty ==
The British Antarctic Territory overlaps with territory claims by both Argentina and Chile. However, territorial claims on the continent may not currently be advanced, under the holding measures of the Antarctic Treaty System.

Gibraltar was captured from Spain in 1704 by a force led by Admiral Sir George Rooke representing the Grand Alliance on behalf of the Archduke Charles, pretender to the Spanish throne. Spanish attempts to regain the territory failed, and it was eventually ceded to the Kingdom of Great Britain under the 1713 Treaty of Utrecht as part of the settlement of the War of the Spanish Succession.

The British Indian Ocean Territory (BIOT) was the subject of a territorial dispute with Mauritius, the government of which claims that the separation of the Chagos Archipelago from the rest of British Mauritius in 1965, three years before Mauritius was granted independence from the United Kingdom, was unlawful. The long-running dispute was referred in 2017 to the International Court of Justice, which issued an advisory opinion on 25 February 2019, which supported the position of the government of Mauritius. On 3 October 2024, British Prime Minister Keir Starmer and Mauritian Prime Minister Pravind Jugnauth jointly announced that an agreement had been reached under which the UK would cede sovereignty over the territory. Under the deal, Diego Garcia will be excluded from any resettlement, and the UK will continue to administer the island for at least 99 years.

== United Nations list of non-self-governing territories ==
Of the eleven territories with a permanent population, all except the Sovereign Base Areas of Akrotiri and Dhekelia in Cyprus continue to be listed by the UN Special Committee on Decolonization as non-self-governing territories since they were listed as dependent territories by the UK when it joined the UN in 1945. This means that the UK remains the official administrative power of these territories, and under Article 73 is therefore required "to develop self-government, to take due account of the political aspirations of the peoples, and to assist them in the progressive development of their free political institutions."

== Relations with the United Kingdom ==
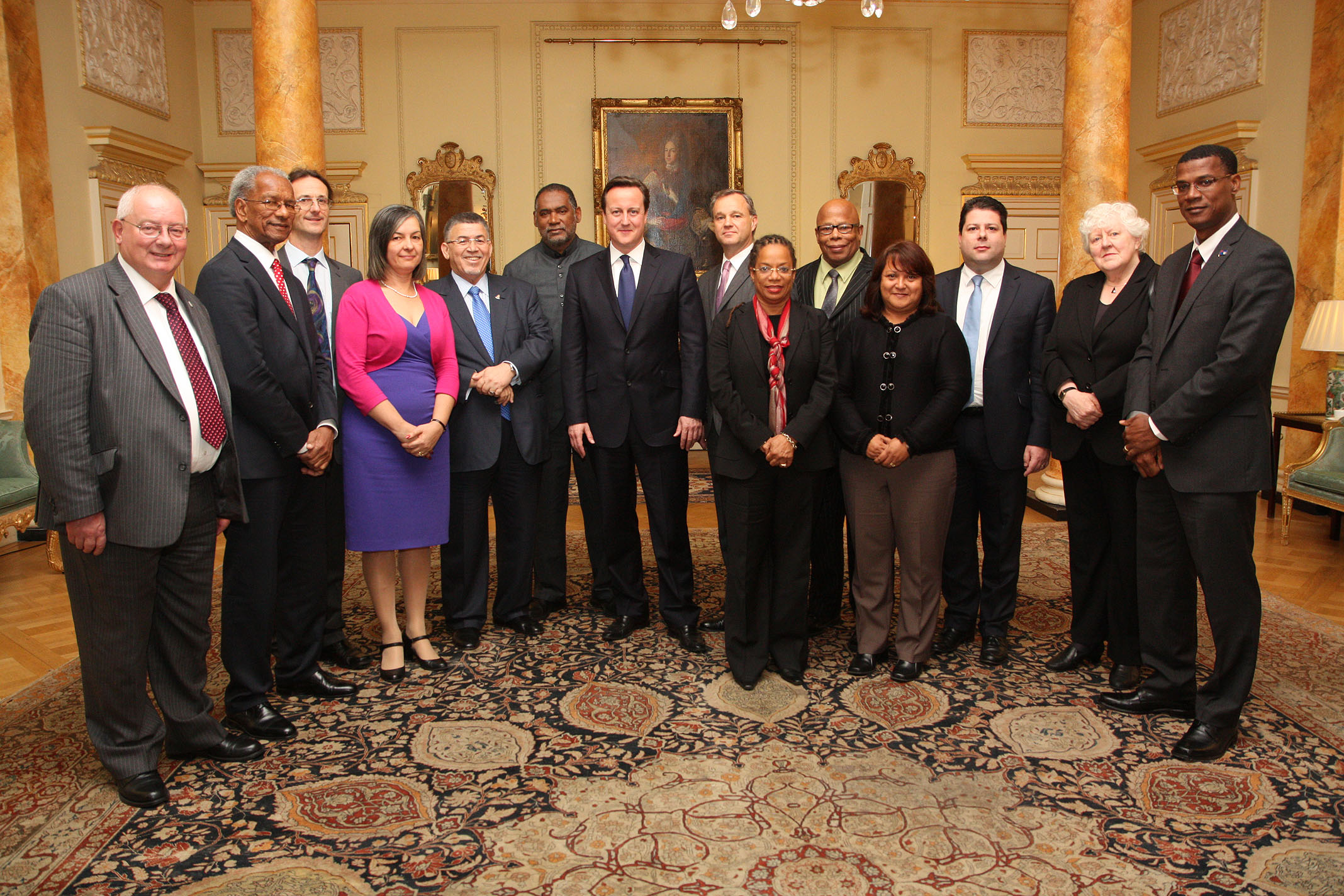
Leaders of the Overseas Territories with the Prime Minister, David Cameron, in 2012

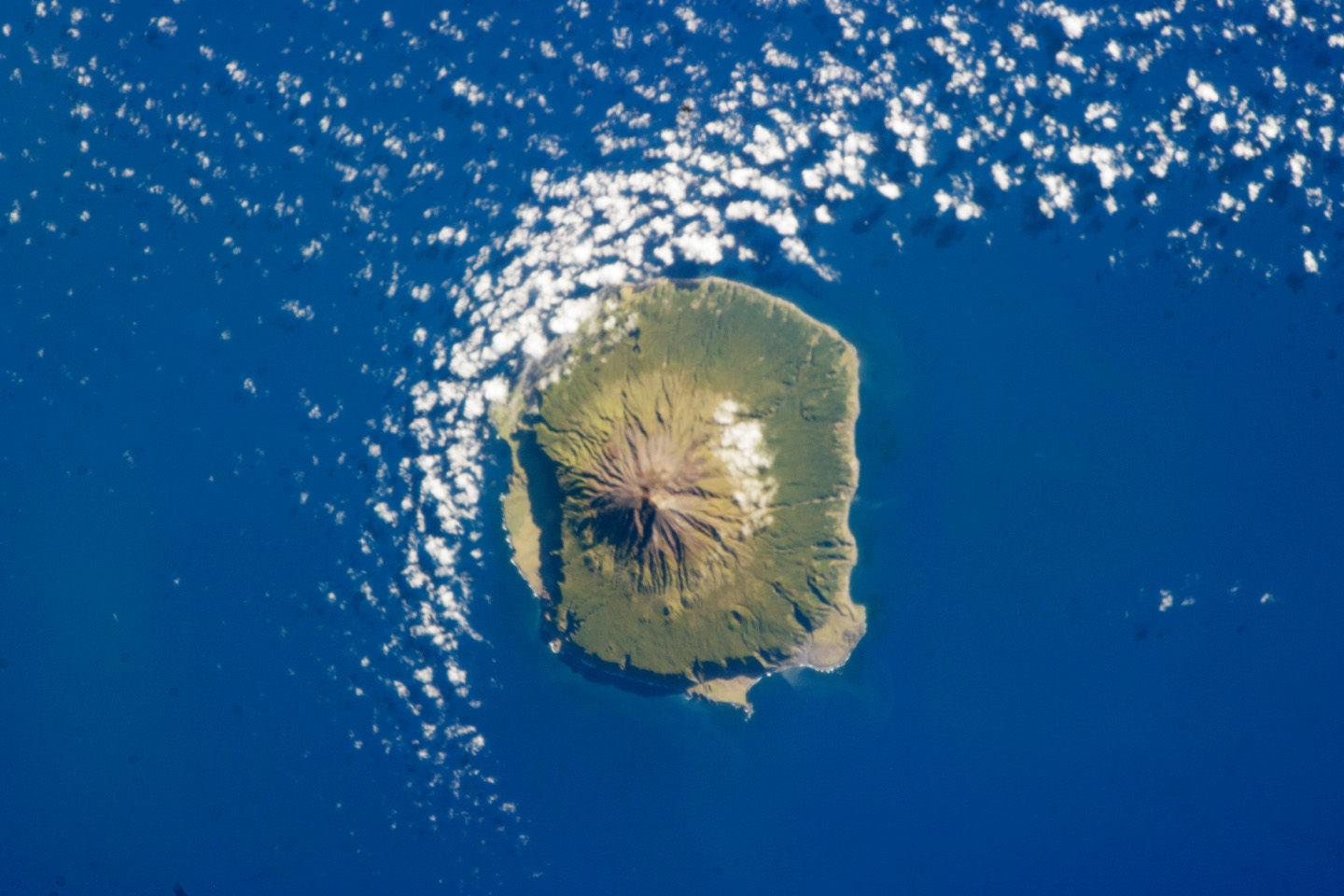
Tristan da Cunha on 6 February 2013, as seen from space. The population was temporarily evacuated to the UK in 1961 because of an eruption.

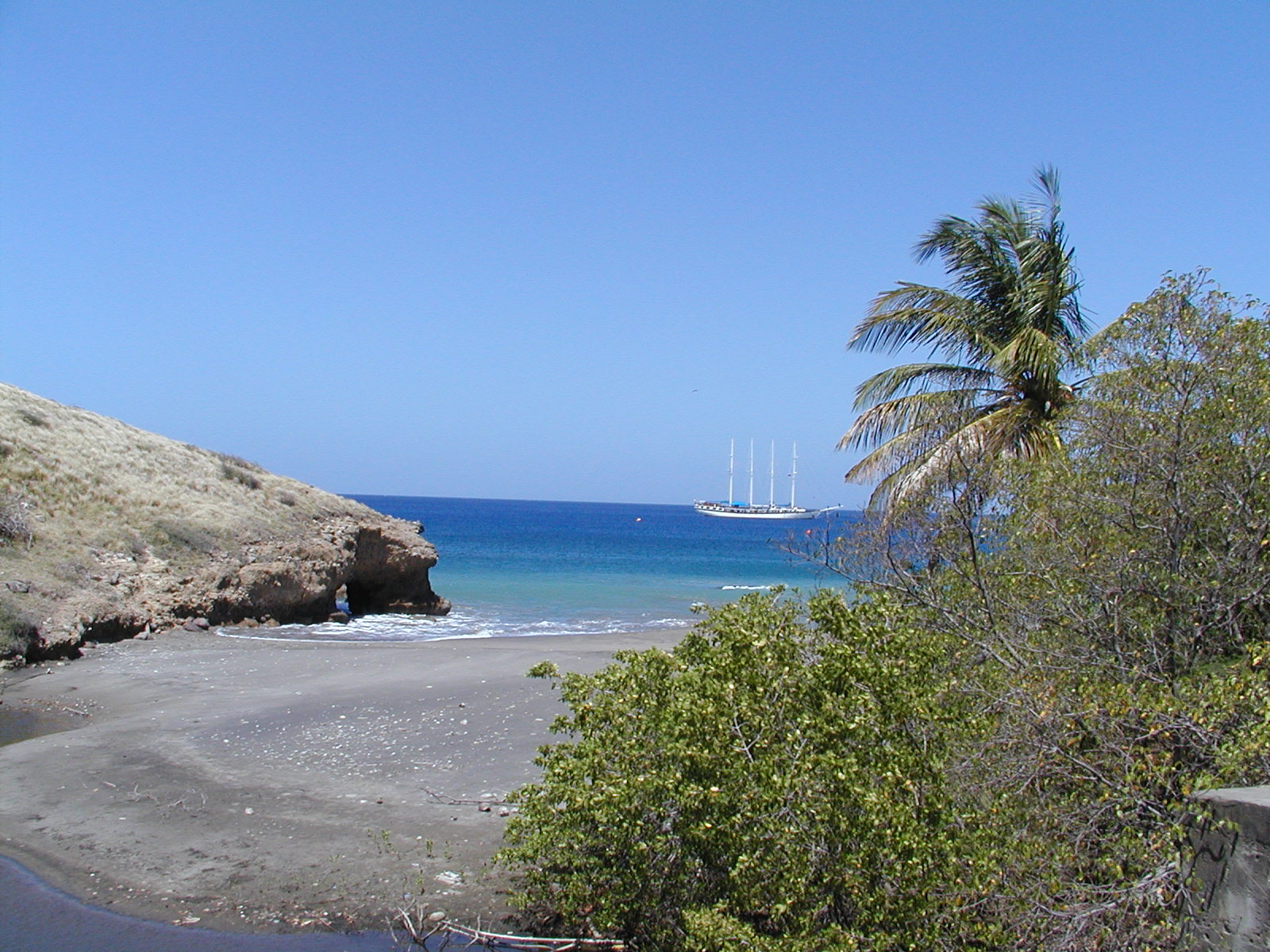
Coastline at Little Bay, the site of the new capital of Montserrat replacing Plymouth. The project is funded by the UK's Foreign, Commonwealth and Development Office (previously the Department for International Development).

British overseas territories at the same geographic scale as the UK

Historically the Secretary of State for the Colonies and the Colonial Office were responsible for overseeing all British Colonies, but today the Foreign, Commonwealth and Development Office (FCDO) has the responsibility of looking after the interests of all overseas territories except the Sovereign Base Areas of Akrotiri and Dhekelia, which comes under the jurisdiction of the Ministry of Defence. Within the FCDO, the general responsibility for the territories is handled by the Overseas Territories Directorate.

In 2012, the FCO published The Overseas Territories: security, success and sustainability which set out Britain's policy for the Overseas Territories, covering six main areas:

- Defence, security and safety of the territories and their people
- Successful and resilient economies
- Cherishing the environment
- Making government work better
- Vibrant and flourishing communities
- Productive links with the wider world

Britain and the Overseas Territories do not have diplomatic representations, although the governments of the overseas territories with indigenous populations all retain a representative office in London. The United Kingdom Overseas Territories Association (UKOTA) also represents the interests of the territories in London. The governments in both London and the territories occasionally meet to mitigate or resolve disagreements over the process of governance in the territories and levels of autonomy.

Britain provides financial assistance to the overseas territories via the FCDO (previously the Department for International Development). As of 2019, only Montserrat, Saint Helena, Pitcairn and Tristan da Cunha receive budgetary aid (i.e. financial contribution to recurrent funding). Several specialist funds are made available by the UK, including:

- The Good Government Fund, which assists with government administration.
- The Economic Diversification Programme Budget, which aims to diversify and enhance the economic bases of the territories.

The territories have no official representation in the UK Parliament, but have informal representation through the all-party parliamentary group, and can petition the UK government through the Directgov e-Petitions website.

Two national parties, UK Independence Party and the Liberal Democrats, have endorsed calls for direct representation of overseas territories in the UK Parliament, as well as backbench members of the Conservative Party and Labour Party.

On 29 January 2024, the Chief Minister of Gibraltar Fabian Picardo addressed the House of Commons Procedure Committee, discussing Gibraltar's representation in the UK Parliament. He highlighted that the UK Government's "Votes for Life" policy now allows all Gibraltarians who have previously lived in the UK, such as students, to register to vote in UK general elections, regardless of how long ago they lived there. However, Picardo noted that there is currently no formal mechanism to ensure Gibraltar's interests are represented under the constituency system, relying instead on the voluntary interest of individual MPs, such as those in the All-Party Parliamentary Group on Gibraltar. He acknowledged the challenge of balancing Westminster representation with Gibraltar's self-governance but suggested that the evolving devolution landscape could provide a framework for addressing this issue.

=== Foreign affairs ===
Map showing the portion of Antarctica claimed by the UK as British Antarctic Territory

Foreign affairs of the overseas territories are handled by the FCDO in London. Some territories maintain diplomatic officers in nearby countries for trade and immigration purposes. Several of the territories in the Americas maintain membership within the Organisation of Eastern Caribbean States, the Caribbean Community, the Caribbean Development Bank, Caribbean Disaster Emergency Management Agency and the Association of Caribbean States. The territories are members of the Commonwealth of Nations through the United Kingdom. The inhabited territories compete in their own right at the Commonwealth Games, and three of the territories (Bermuda, the Cayman Islands and the British Virgin Islands) sent teams to the 2016 Summer Olympics.

Although the Crown Dependencies of Jersey, Guernsey and the Isle of Man are also under the sovereignty of the British monarch, they are in a different constitutional relationship with the United Kingdom. The British Overseas Territories and Crown Dependencies are themselves distinct from the Commonwealth realms, a group of 15 independent countries (including the United Kingdom) sharing Charles III as monarch and head of state, and from the Commonwealth of Nations, a voluntary association of 56 countries mostly with historic links to the British Empire (which also includes all Commonwealth realms). Notably, while not independent Commonwealth realms, the territories are separately represented at the Commonwealth Games on the same basis as independent nation members, as are the three Crown Dependencies of Jersey, Guernsey and the Isle of Man.

Full British citizenship has been granted to most 'belongers' of overseas territories (mainly since the British Overseas Territories Act 2002).

Most countries do not recognise the sovereignty claims of any other country, including Britain's, to Antarctica and its offshore islands. Five nations contest, with counter-claims, the UK's sovereignty in the following overseas territories:

- British Antarctic Territory – territory overlaps Antarctic claims made by Chile and Argentina
- British Indian Ocean Territory – claimed by Mauritius
- Falkland Islands – claimed by Argentina
- Gibraltar – claimed by Spain
- South Georgia and the South Sandwich Islands – claimed by Argentina

=== Citizenship ===
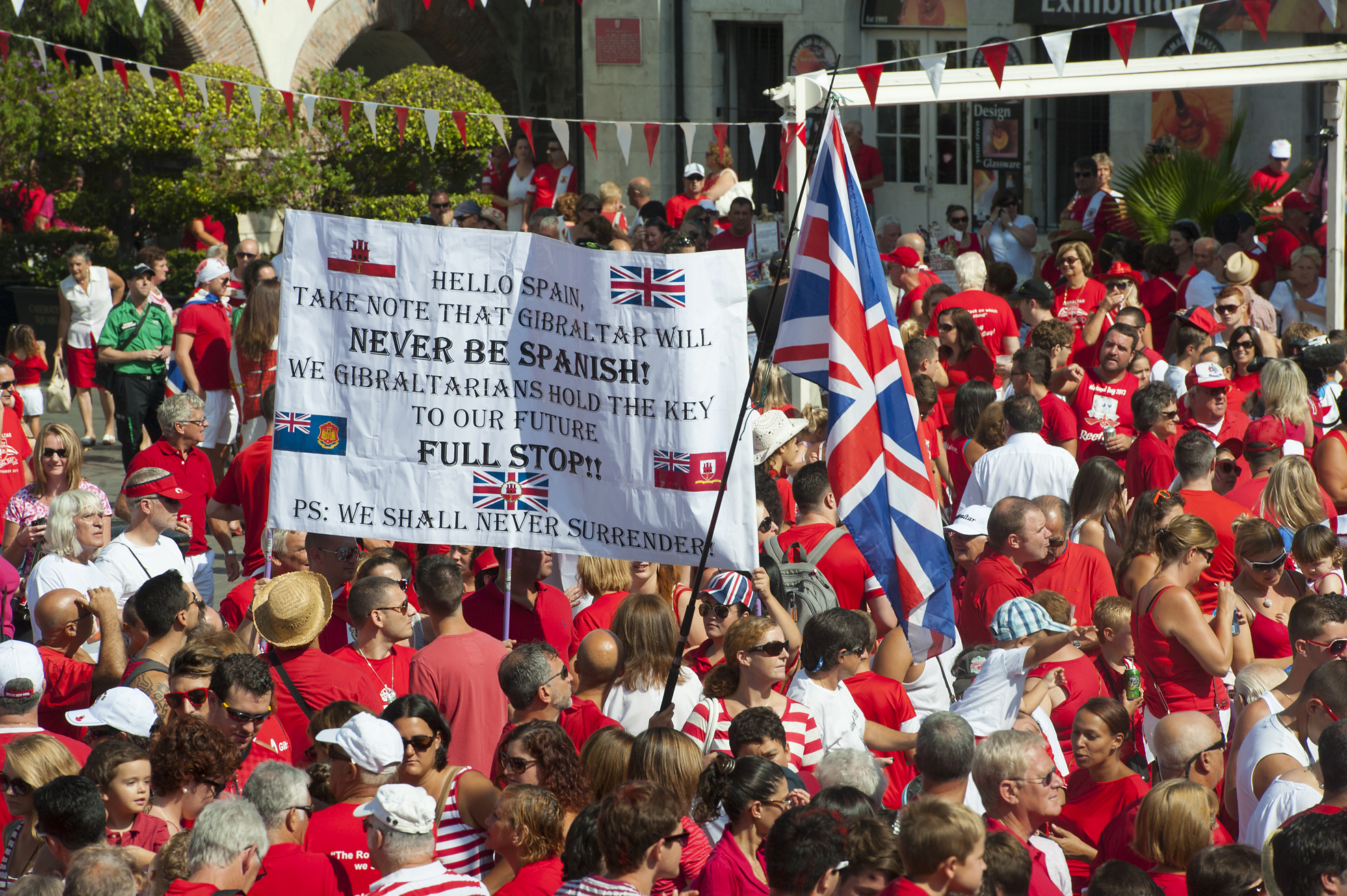
Thousands of Gibraltarians dress in their national colours of red and white during the 2013 Gibraltar National Day celebrations. Gibraltarians were the only group of overseas territories residents who could apply for full British citizenship without restrictions before 2002.

From 1949 to 1983, the nationality status of Citizenship of UK and Colonies (CUKC) was shared by residents of the UK proper and residents of overseas territories, although most residents of overseas territories lost their automatic right to live in the UK after the ratification of Commonwealth Immigrants Act 1968 that year unless they were born in the UK proper or had a parent or a grandparent born in the UK. In 1983, CUKC status of residents of overseas territories without the right of abode in the UK was replaced by British Dependent Territories citizenship (BDTC) in the newly minted British Nationality Act 1981, a status that does not come with it the right of abode in the UK or any overseas territory. For these residents, registration as full British citizens then required physical residence in the UK proper. There were only two exceptions: Falkland Islanders, who were automatically granted British citizenship, and with the Falkland Islands treated as a part of the UK proper through the enactment of British Nationality (Falkland Islands) Act 1983 due to the Falklands War with Argentina; and Gibraltarians, who were given the special entitlement to be registered as British citizens upon request without further conditions because of its individual membership in the European Economic Area and the European Economic Community.

Five years after the handover of Hong Kong to China in 1997, the British government amended the 1981 Act to give British citizenship without restrictions to all BDTCs (the status was also renamed BOTC at the same time) except for those solely connected with Akrotiri and Dhekelia (whose residents already held Cypriot citizenship). This restored the right of abode in the UK to residents of overseas territories after a 34-year hiatus from 1968 to 2002.

=== Military ===
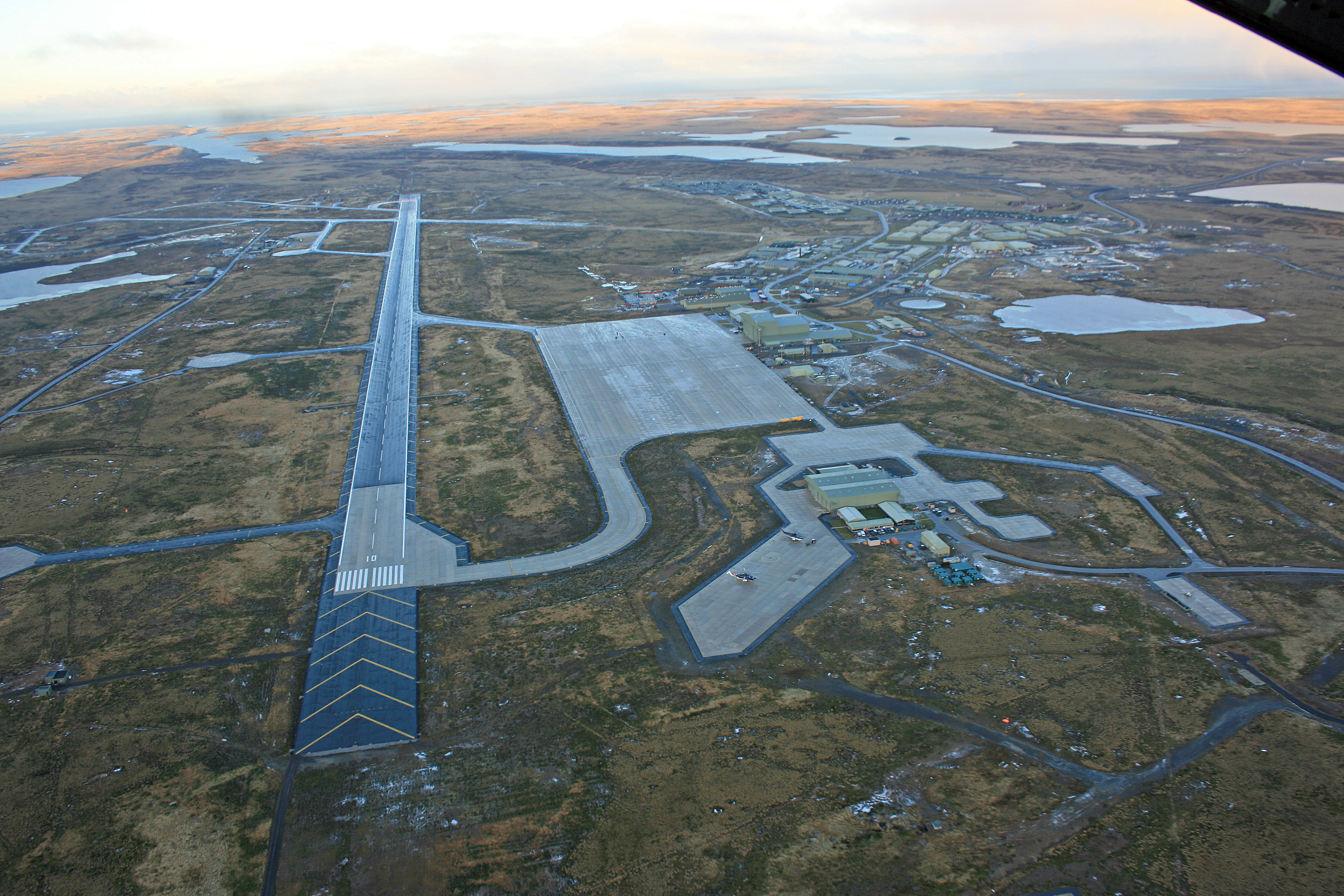
RAF Mount Pleasant, Falkland Islands

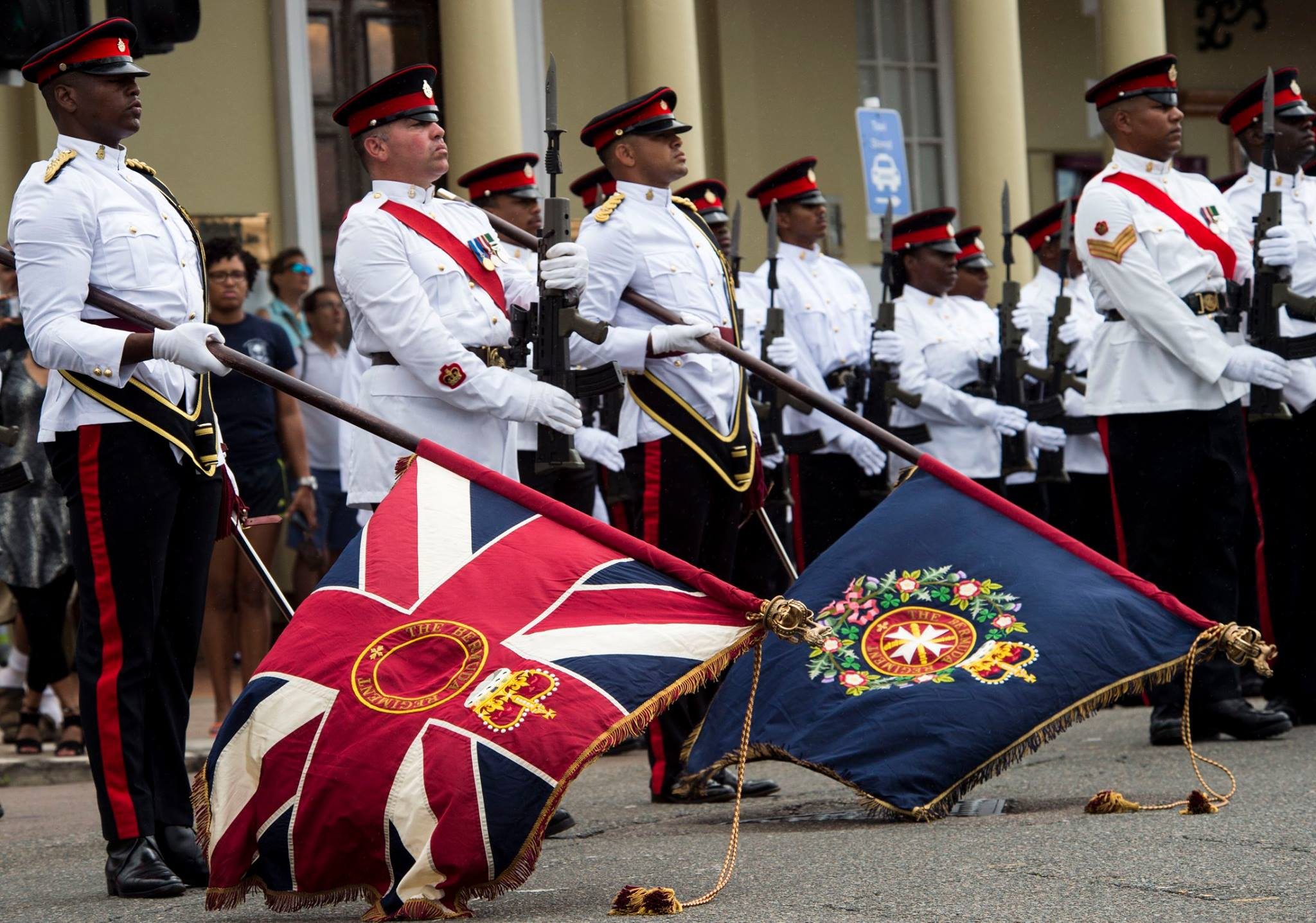
Colour party of the Royal Bermuda Regiment at Queen's Birthday Parade in 2017

Defence of the overseas territories is the responsibility of the United Kingdom. Many of the overseas territories are used as military bases by the United Kingdom and its allies:

- Ascension Island (part of Saint Helena, Ascension and Tristan da Cunha) – the base known as RAF Ascension Island is used by both the Royal Air Force and the United States Air Force.
- Bermuda – became the primary Royal Navy base in North America, following US independence, and was designated an Imperial fortress. The naval establishment included an admiralty, a dockyard, and a naval squadron. A considerable military garrison was built up to protect it, and Bermuda, which the British government came to see as a base, rather than as a colony, was known as Fortress Bermuda, and the Gibraltar of the West (Bermudians, like Gibraltarians, also dub their territory "The Rock"). Canada and the United States also established bases in Bermuda during the Second World War, which were maintained through the Cold War. Four air bases were located in Bermuda during the Second World War (operated by the Royal Air Force, Royal Navy, United States Navy and United States Army / United States Army Air Forces). Since 1995, the naval and military force in Bermuda has been reduced to the local territorial battalion, the Royal Bermuda Regiment.
- British Indian Ocean Territory – the island of Diego Garcia is home to a large naval base and airbase leased to the United States by the United Kingdom until 2036 (unless renewed). There are British forces in small numbers in the BIOT for administrative and immigration purposes.
- Falkland Islands – the British Forces Falkland Islands includes commitments from the British Army, Royal Air Force and Royal Navy, along with the Falkland Islands Defence Force.
- Gibraltar – Historically designated (along with Bermuda, Malta, and Halifax, Nova Scotia) as an Imperial fortress. British Forces Gibraltar included a Royal Navy Dockyard, HM Dockyard, Gibraltar, now Gibdock (also used by the Royal Navy), RAF Gibraltar – used by the RAF and NATO and a local infantry garrison – the Royal Gibraltar Regiment, which is part of the British Army. Spain, even though a member of NATO itself, has banned all visits to Gibraltar by non-UK craft. Even RAF UK fighter aircraft are banned, and only transport planes are permitted.
- The Sovereign Base Areas of Akrotiri and Dhekelia in Cyprus – maintained as strategic British military bases in the eastern Mediterranean Sea.
- Montserrat – the Royal Montserrat Defence Force, historically connected with the Irish Guards, is a body of twenty volunteers, whose duties are primarily ceremonial.
- Cayman Islands – The Cayman Islands Regiment is the home defence unit of the Cayman Islands. It is a single territorial infantry battalion of the British Armed Forces that was formed in 2020.
- Turks and Caicos – The Turks and Caicos Islands Regiment is the home defence unit of the British Overseas Territory of the Turks and Caicos Islands. It is a single territorial infantry battalion of the British Armed Forces that was formed in 2020, similar to the Cayman Regiment.

== City status and cities ==
As overseas territories came under the administration of the British Empire, several towns and villages began to request formal recognition to validate their importance, and would be accorded a status if deemed to be deserving such as a borough or as a more prestigious city by the monarch. Many cities were designated over several centuries, and as Anglican dioceses began to be created internationally from the 18th century, the process of city creation became aligned to that used in England, being linked to the presence of a cathedral. Later on, this process became untenable, and other selection criteria and royal occasions were used instead. However, mainly from the 20th century onwards, increasing levels of states becoming fully independent caused the number of remaining cities to reduce substantially.

Since the second Millennium, competitions have been arranged by the UK government to grant city status to settlements. In 2021, submissions for city status were invited to mark the Platinum Jubilee of Elizabeth II, with Crown Dependencies and British Overseas Territories being allowed to take part for the first time. In the Overseas Territories, the applicants were George Town (in the Cayman Islands), Gibraltar and Stanley (in the Falkland Islands). It was later discovered that Gibraltar had been previously named a city, researchers at The National Archives confirming that Gibraltar's city status was still in effect, with the territory missing from the official list of cities for the past 140 years. Stanley and Douglas on the Isle of Man were later granted the honour, and alongside Hamilton, Bermuda, and Jamestown, St Helena, making a present total of five cities.

== Languages ==
Most of the languages other than English spoken in the territories contain a large degree of English, either as a root language or in code-switching, e.g. Yanito. They include:

- Yanito (English and Spanish) or Spanish, Arabic, Hebrew, Hindi (Gibraltar)
- Cayman Islands English or Cayman Creole (Cayman Islands)
- Turks and Caicos Creole (Turks and Caicos Islands)
- Pitkern (Pitcairn Islands)
- Greek (Akrotiri and Dhekelia)

Forms of English:

- Bermudian English (Bermuda)
- Falkland Islands English

== Currencies ==
The 14 British overseas territories use a varied assortment of currencies, including the Euro, British pound, United States dollar, New Zealand dollar, or their own currencies, which may be pegged to one of these.

Location	Currency	Issuing authority
Akrotiri and Dhekelia	Euro	European Central Bank
British Antarctic Territory; Tristan da Cunha (Note: Part of the British Overseas Territory of Saint Helena, Ascension and Tristan da Cunha.); South Georgia and the South Sandwich Islands	Pound sterling	Bank of England
Falkland Islands	Falkland Islands pound (parity with pound sterling); Pound sterling (widely circulated and accepted universally); Euro (accepted unofficially in most establishments); United States dollar (accepted unofficially in most establishments)	Government of the Falkland Islands
Gibraltar	Gibraltar pound (parity with pound sterling); Pound sterling (widely circulated and accepted universally)	Government of Gibraltar
Saint Helena and Ascension Island	Saint Helena pound (parity with pound sterling)	Government of Saint Helena
British Virgin Islands; Turks and Caicos Islands	United States dollar	US Federal Reserve
Anguilla; Montserrat	Eastern Caribbean dollar (pegged to US dollar at 2.7ECD=1USD)	Eastern Caribbean Central Bank
Bermuda	Bermudian dollar (parity with US dollar); United States dollar (widely circulated and accepted universally)	Bermuda Monetary Authority
Cayman Islands	Cayman Islands dollar (pegged to US dollar at 1KYD=1.2USD)	Cayman Islands Monetary Authority
Pitcairn Islands	New Zealand dollar United States dollar (accepted unofficially); Pound sterling is also accepted. Pitcairn Islands dollar (parity with New Zealand dollar; commemorative issue only)	Reserve Bank of New Zealand
British Indian Ocean Territory	United States dollar (de facto); Pound sterling (de jure)	US Federal Reserve; Bank of England

== Insignia and symbols ==
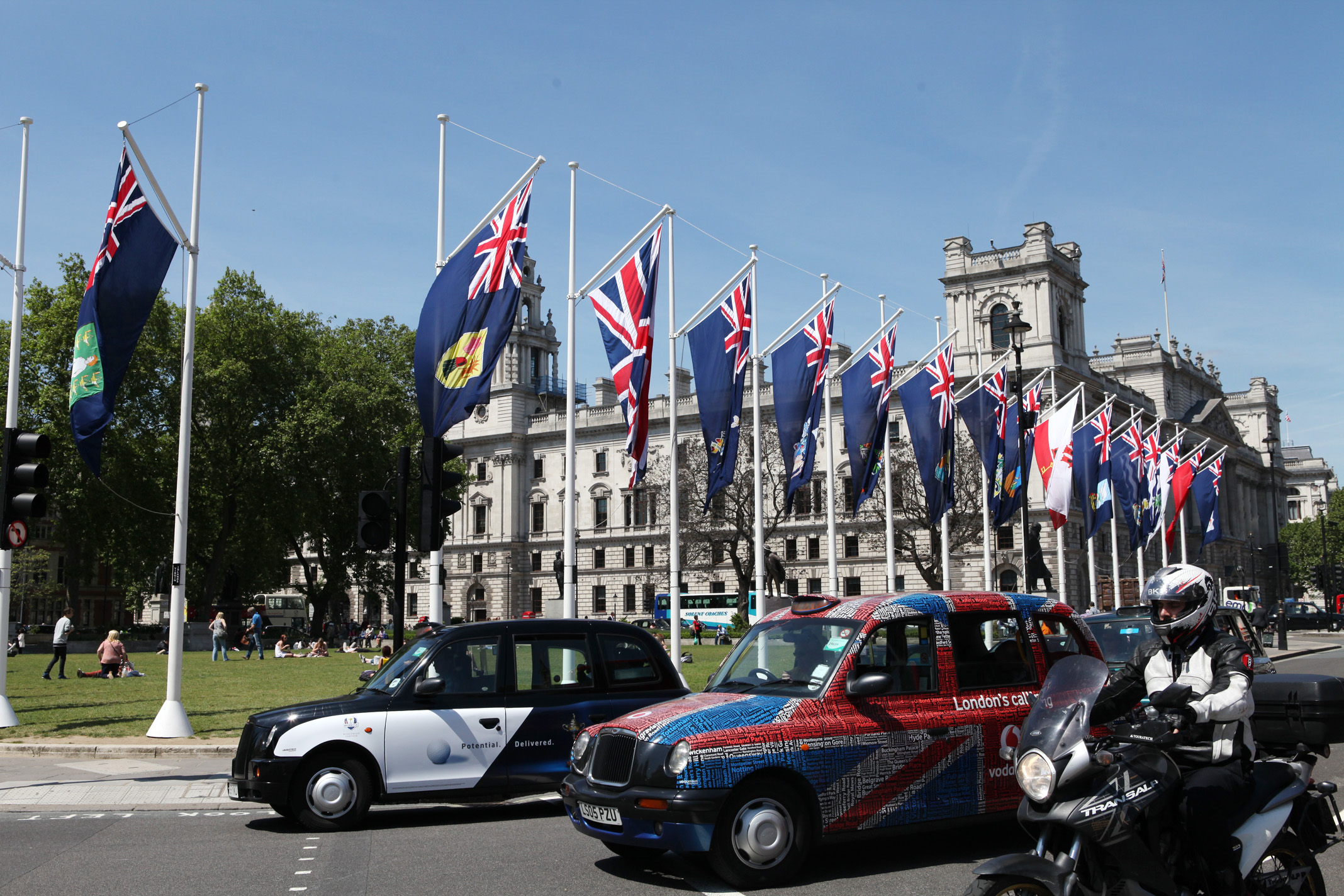
Overseas Territories flags in Parliament Square in 2013

Each overseas territory has been granted its own flag and coat of arms by the British monarch. Traditionally, the flags follow the Blue Ensign design, with the Union Flag in the canton, and the territory's coat of arms in the fly. Exceptions to this are Bermuda which uses a Red Ensign; British Antarctic Territory which uses a White Ensign, but without the overall cross of St. George; British Indian Ocean Territory which uses a Blue Ensign with wavy lines to symbolise the sea; and Gibraltar which uses a banner of its coat of arms (the flag of the city of Gibraltar). Akrotiri and Dhekelia and Saint Helena, Ascension and Tristan da Cunha are the only British Overseas Territories without their own flag, although Saint Helena, Ascension Island, and Tristan da Cunha have their own individual flags. Only the Union Flag, which is the national flag in all the territories, is used in these territories.

== Sports ==
Bermuda, the British Virgin Islands and the Cayman Islands are the only British Overseas Territories with recognised National Olympic Committees (NOCs); the British Olympic Association is recognised as the appropriate NOC for athletes from the other territories, and thus athletes who hold a British passport are eligible to represent Great Britain at the Olympic Games.

Shara Proctor from Anguilla, Delano Williams from the Turks and Caicos Islands, Jenaya Wade-Fray from Bermuda and Georgina Cassar from Gibraltar strove to represent Team GB at the London 2012 Olympics. Proctor, Wade-Fray and Cassar qualified for Team GB, with Williams missing the cut; however, wishing to represent the UK in 2016.

The Gibraltar national football team was accepted into UEFA in 2013 in time for the 2016 European Championships. It has been accepted by FIFA and went into the 2018 FIFA World Cup qualifying, where they achieved 0 points. Gibraltar has hosted and competed in the Island Games, most recently in 2023.

== Biodiversity ==
The World Heritage Sites of the UK (Overseas Territories): The natural sites of Gough and Inaccessible Islands and Henderson Island are marked green, the cultural sites of the Historic Town of St George and Related Fortifications, and Gorham's Cave are marked red.

The British Overseas Territories have more biodiversity than the entire UK mainland. There are at least 180 endemic plant species in the overseas territories as opposed to only 12 on the UK mainland. Responsibility for the protection of biodiversity and meeting obligations under international environmental conventions is shared between the UK Government and the local governments of the territories.

Two areas, Henderson Island in the Pitcairn Islands as well as the islands of Gough and Inaccessible of Tristan da Cunha are listed as UNESCO World Heritage Sites, and two other territories, the Turks and Caicos Islands and Saint Helena, are on the United Kingdom's tentative list for future UNESCO World Heritage Sites. Gibraltar's Gorham's Cave Complex is also found on the UK's tentative UNESCO World Heritage Site list. The three regions of biodiversity hotspots situated in the British Overseas Territories are the Caribbean Islands, the Mediterranean Basin and the Oceania ecozone in the Pacific.

The UK created the largest continuous marine protected areas in the world, the Chagos Marine Protected Area, and announced in 2015 funding to establish a new, larger, reserve around the Pitcairn Islands.

In January 2016, the UK government announced the intention to create a marine protected area around Ascension Island. The protected area would be 234,291 square kilometres (90,460 sq mi), half of which would be closed to fishing.

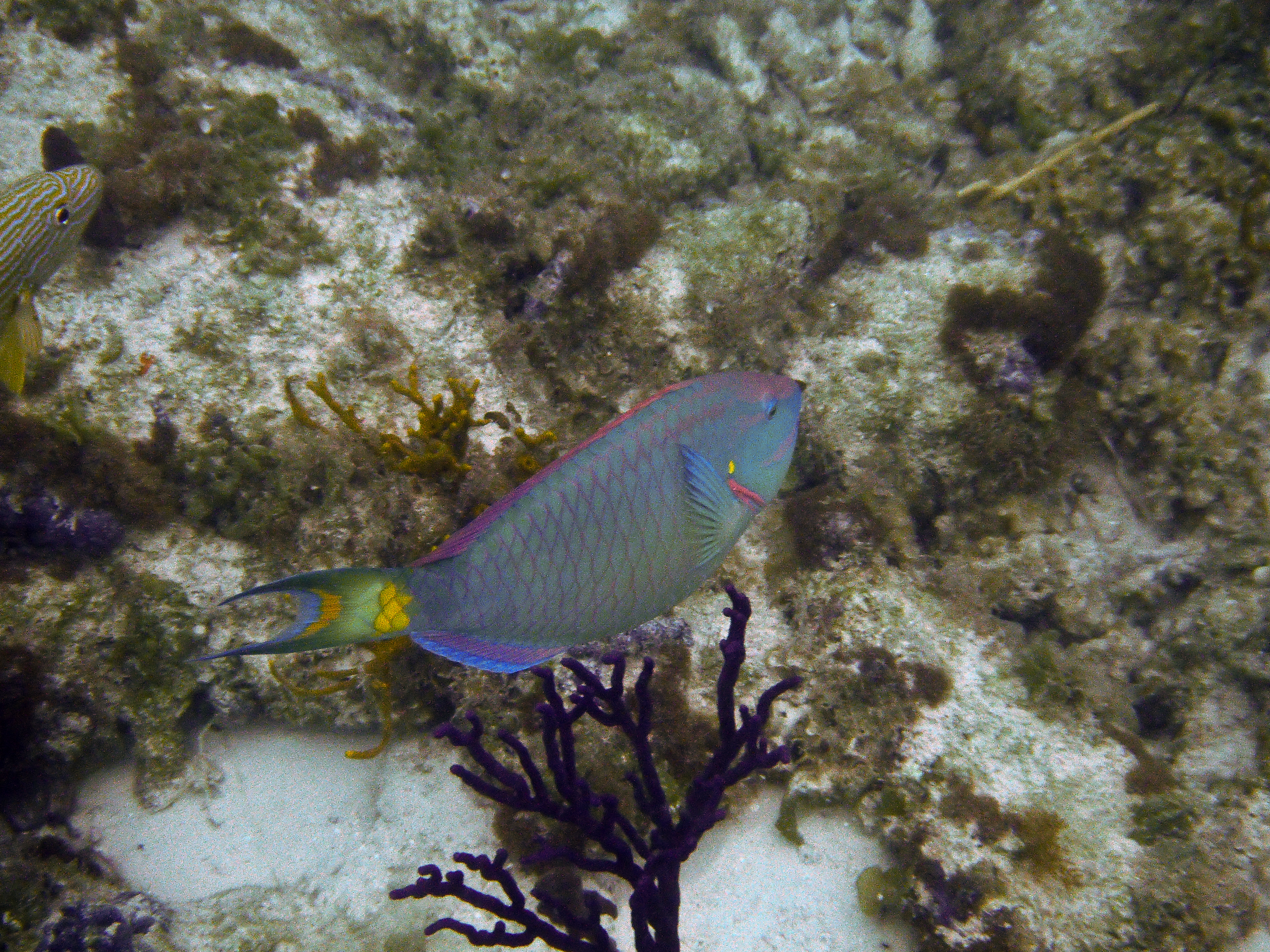
A Stoplight parrotfish in Princess Alexandra Land and Sea National Park, Providenciales, Turks and Caicos Islands

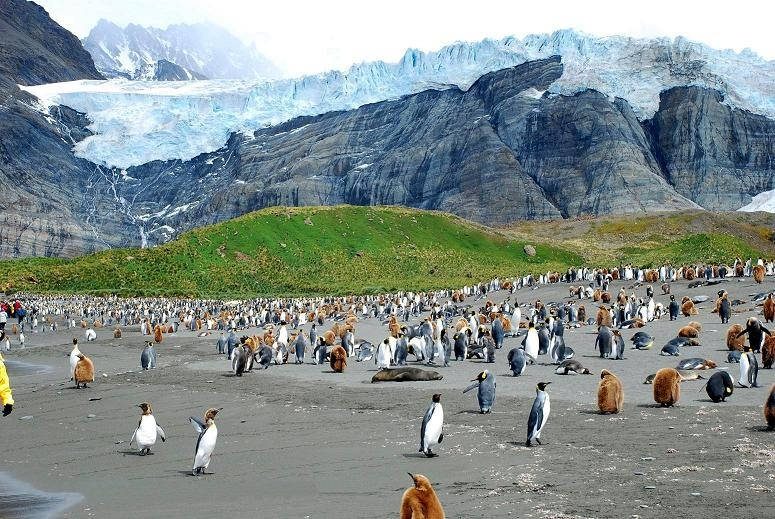
Penguins in South Georgia, 2010

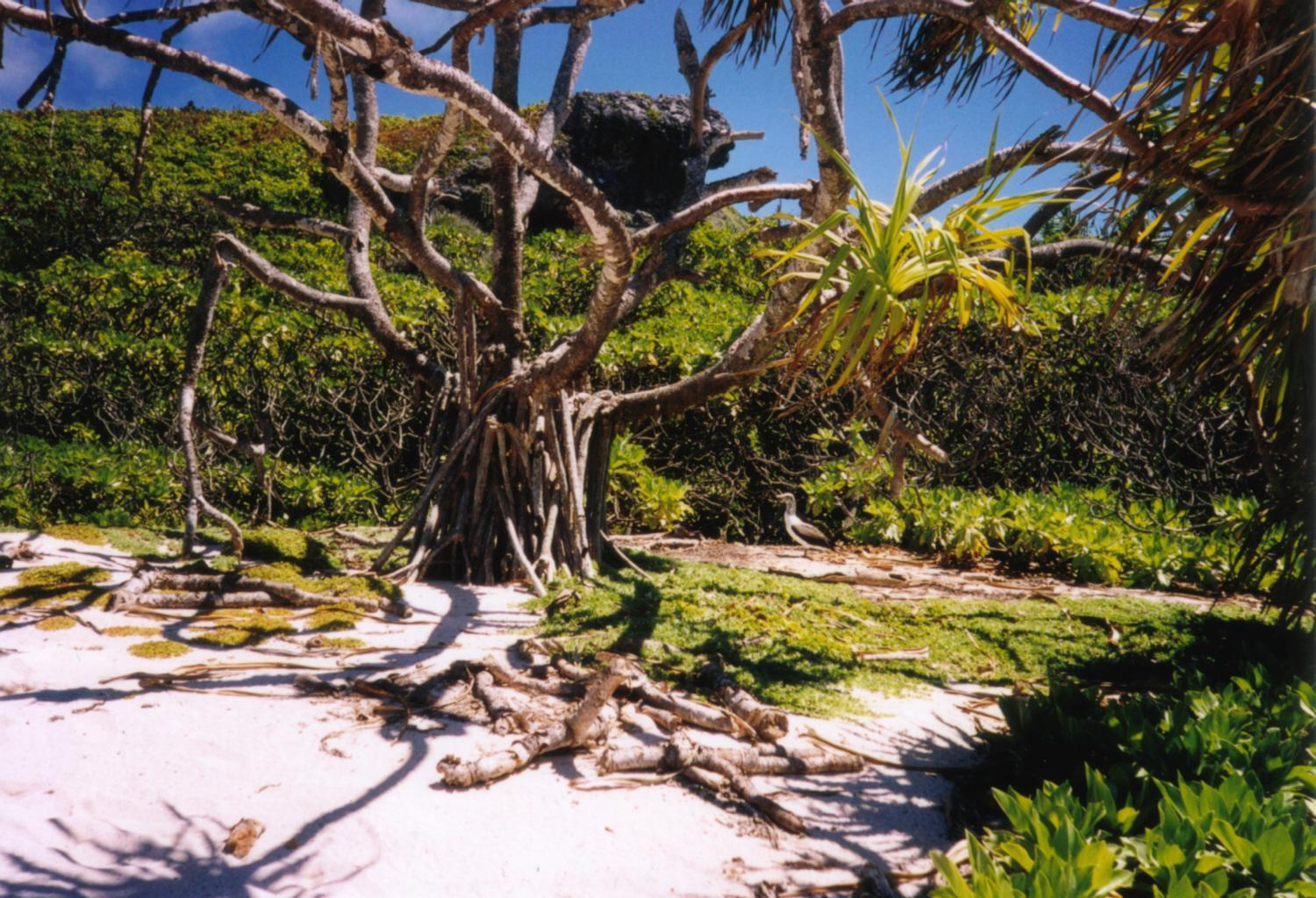
Henderson Island in the Pitcairn Islands

== See also ==
- British Empire
- British Overseas Territories citizens in the United Kingdom
- Crown Colony – Crown Dependencies
- European microstates
- List of British Army installations
- War Department (United Kingdom)
- Secretary of State for the Colonies
- Postcodes in the United Kingdom#Overseas territories
- List of countries that have gained independence from the United Kingdom
- List of stock exchanges in the United Kingdom, the British Crown Dependencies and United Kingdom Overseas Territories
- List of universities in the United Kingdom#Universities in British Overseas Territories
- Membership of British Overseas Territories and Crown Dependencies in international organisations
- UK Overseas Territories Conservation Forum
- Overseas France
