= Foreign relations of Benin =

After seizing power in the 1972 coup d'état, Major Mathieu Kérékou declared the People's Republic of Benin a Marxist-Leninist state and sought financial support from communist governments in Eastern Europe and Asia. To distance the modern state from its colonial past, the country became the People's Republic of Benin in 1975. However, Benin dropped the socialist ideology in 1989 following pressure from creditors and domestic unrest related to economic hardship.

In recent years Benin has strengthened ties with France, the former colonial power, as well as the United States and the main international lending institutions. Benin has also adopted a mediating role in the political crises in Liberia, Guinea-Bissau, and Togo and provided a contribution to the United Nations force in Haiti, all of which were indications of the country's growing confidence in the international community. Some of the allies of Benin are France, India, US, UK, Netherlands, Ghana, and China.

== Diplomatic relations ==
List of countries which Benin maintains diplomatic relations with:

#	Country	Date
1	United Kingdom	1 August 1960
2	United States	1 August 1960
3	France	2 August 1960
4	Germany	12 August 1960
5	Haiti	December 1960
6	Belgium	3 January 1961
7	Japan	April 1961
8	Brazil	17 May 1961
9	South Korea	1 August 1961
10	Democratic Republic of the Congo	22 August 1961
11	Nigeria	12 September 1961
12	Sweden	17 November 1961
13	Switzerland	21 November 1961
14	Italy	30 November 1961
15	Israel	5 December 1961
16	Netherlands	26 December 1961
17	Guinea	26 February 1962
18	Canada	27 April 1962
19	Russia	4 June 1962
20	Czech Republic	11 June 1962
21	Poland	14 June 1962
22	Ghana	20 June 1962
23	Hungary	21 June 1962
24	Bulgaria	25 June 1962
25	Lebanon	27 June 1962
26	Romania	29 June 1962
27	Serbia	3 July 1962
28	Sudan	23 July 1962
29	India	25 June 1963
30	Pakistan	10 December 1963
31	Liberia	1963
32	Norway	25 September 1964
33	Algeria	7 November 1964
34	China	12 November 1964
35	Syria	29 November 1964
36	Denmark	15 December 1964
37	Egypt	15 December 1964
38	Mali	27 August 1965
39	Austria	November 1965
40	Spain	25 March 1966
41	Ethiopia	7 May 1966
42	Morocco	5 November 1966
43	Tunisia	22 December 1966
44	Luxembourg	17 September 1968
45	Gabon	29 October 1969
46	Mauritania	1970
—	Holy See	29 June 1971
—	Sovereign Military Order of Malta	1972
47	North Korea	5 February 1973
48	Cameroon	5 March 1973
49	Vietnam	14 March 1973
50	Libya	31 March 1973
51	Cuba	1 February 1974
52	Zambia	8 February 1974
53	Turkey	29 March 1974
54	Argentina	20 May 1974
55	Albania	4 October 1974
56	Mexico	30 October 1975
57	Greece	1975
58	Angola	11 October 1976
59	Chad	18 October 1976
60	Laos	2 January 1977
61	Mongolia	30 March 1977
62	Portugal	25 July 1977
63	Republic of the Congo	9 September 1978
64	Uganda	1978
65	Tanzania	25 May 1979
66	Togo	29 October 1979
67	Thailand	5 October 1980
68	Equatorial Guinea	10 April 1981
69	Kenya	12 March 1982
70	Somalia	12 March 1982
71	Niger	14 May 1982
72	Ivory Coast	28 October 1983
73	Iran	1983
74	Nicaragua	5 June 1984
75	Afghanistan	5 December 1984
76	Rwanda	21 March 1985
77	United Arab Emirates	5 January 1986
78	Kuwait	24 December 1987
79	Seychelles	1 March 1988
80	Colombia	30 November 1988
81	Finland	22 December 1988
82	Iraq	24 July 1989
—	State of Palestine	1989
83	Namibia	13 August 1990
84	Venezuela	20 June 1991
85	Ukraine	10 April 1992
86	Slovakia	19 January 1993
87	Singapore	21 February 1994
88	Brunei	1 March 1994
89	Indonesia	10 March 1994
90	South Africa	19 May 1994
91	Costa Rica	28 June 1994
92	Cambodia	23 January 1995
93	Malaysia	30 January 1995
94	Guatemala	14 November 1995
95	Latvia	19 March 1997
96	Philippines	8 August 1997
97	Azerbaijan	14 October 1999
98	Qatar	2 November 1999
99	Dominican Republic	24 November 1999
100	Croatia	26 March 2001
101	Belarus	21 June 2001
102	Mauritius	24 March 2003
103	Saudi Arabia	25 June 2004
104	North Macedonia	26 November 2004
105	Slovenia	1 December 2004
106	Iceland	23 February 2005
107	Australia	28 April 2005
108	Estonia	27 June 2005
109	Uzbekistan	17 August 2005
110	Lithuania	2 September 2005
111	Panama	20 September 2005
112	Andorra	24 March 2006
113	Jamaica	25 April 2006
114	Botswana	21 February 2007
115	Armenia	2 August 2007
116	Uruguay	14 February 2008
117	Djibouti	16 June 2008
118	Bangladesh	14 July 2008
119	Kyrgyzstan	29 January 2009
120	Paraguay	18 February 2009
121	Malta	25 March 2009
122	Bosnia and Herzegovina	11 September 2009
123	Chile	25 August 2010
124	Tajikistan	8 July 2011
125	Kazakhstan	13 September 2011
126	Montenegro	15 September 2011
127	Fiji	16 September 2011
128	Maldives	16 September 2011
129	South Sudan	29 January 2013
130	New Zealand	27 June 2013
131	Sri Lanka	12 August 2013
132	Burundi	13 January 2014
133	Yemen	24 February 2014
134	Jordan	4 June 2014
135	Georgia	25 September 2014
136	Peru	22 November 2017
137	Nepal	23 January 2018
138	Moldova	24 January 2018
139	Comoros	17 May 2018
140	Zimbabwe	19 July 2018
141	Turkmenistan	26 July 2018
142	Mozambique	24 October 2018
143	Oman	16 November 2018
144	Malawi	19 February 2019
145	São Tomé and Príncipe	20 February 2019
146	Monaco	8 March 2019
147	Ireland	28 May 2019
148	Liechtenstein	26 June 2019
149	Myanmar	2 July 2019
150	Ecuador	7 October 2019
151	San Marino	29 September 2020
152	Saint Kitts and Nevis	2 June 2022
153	Guinea-Bissau	10 November 2022
154	Belize	14 September 2023
155	Bahrain	21 September 2023
156	Grenada	21 September 2023
157	Saint Vincent and the Grenadines	3 October 2023
158	Cyprus	10 October 2023
159	Timor-Leste	10 October 2023
160	El Salvador	18 October 2023
161	Antigua and Barbuda	21 December 2023
162	Bahamas	21 January 2024
163	Saint Lucia	25 June 2024
164	Marshall Islands	2 July 2024
165	Guyana	9 July 2024
166	Bolivia	24 July 2024
167	Dominica	24 September 2024
168	Nauru	6 November 2024
169	Vanuatu	5 June 2025
170	Federated States of Micronesia	14 August 2025
171	Solomon Islands	22 August 2025
172	Trinidad and Tobago	23 September 2025
173	Palau	24 September 2025
174	Samoa	8 May 2026
175	Suriname	5 November 2026
176	Burkina Faso	Unknown
177	Gambia	Unknown
178	Senegal	Unknown
179	Sierra Leone	Unknown

== Bilateral relations ==
Sovereign state	Formal Relations Began	Notes
China	12 November 1964	See Benin–China relations The People's Republic of China and the Republic of Benin established diplomatic relations on November 12, 1964, yet in January 1966, Benin unilaterally severed the relations with China and the April that year to "resume relations" with Taiwan. On December 29, 1972, the Mathieu Kérékon Government restored the relations with China and then the relations saw a favorable development afterwards.: Benin has an embassy in Beijing.; China has an embassy in Cotonou.
Denmark	15 December 1964	See Benin–Denmark relations Both countries established diplomatic relations on 15 December 1964 when was accredited first ambassador of Dahomey to Denmark Dr. Nicolas Amoussou Ewagnignon
France	2 August 1960	Both countries established diplomatic relations on 2 August 1960: Benin has an embassy in Paris.; France has an embassy in Cotonou.
Haiti	December 1960	See Benin–Haiti relations Both countries established diplomatic relations in December 1960 with Haiti opening an embassy in Dahomey. The embassy was closed in 1963 and reopened again in Cotonou in February 2004. Haiti closed once more its embassy in Benin on 11 December 2018, however, Haiti re-opened its embassy in Cotonou in May 2026.: Benin does not have an accreditation for Haiti.; Haiti has an embassy in Cotonou.
India	25 June 1963	See Benin–India relations: India is accredited to Benin from its high commission in Abuja, Nigeria.
Kenya	12 March 1982	See Benin–Kenya relations Both countries established diplomatic relations on 12 March 1982 when first ambassador of Kenya to Benin Mr. Alfred Imbahale Machayo presented his credentials to Head of State of Benin Mr. Mathieu Kérékou.: Benin is accredited to Kenya from its embassy in Addis Ababa, Ethiopia.; Kenya's is accredited to Benin from its high commission in Abuja, Nigeria.
Mexico	30 October 1975	Benin is accredited to Mexico from its embassy in Washington, D.C., United States.; Mexico is accredited to Benin from its embassy in Abuja, Nigeria and has an honorary consulate in Cotonou.
Russia	4 June 1962	See Benin–Russia relations: Benin has an embassy in Moscow.; Russia has an embassy in Cotonou.
Turkey	29 March 1974	Benin–Turkey relations Both countries established diplomatic relations on 29 March 1974 when first Turkish Ambassador Mr. Talat Benler presented his credentials to President Mathieu Kerekou in Cotonou.: Turkey has an embassy in Cotonou.; Trade volume between the two countries was US$142 million in 2019.; There are direct flights from Istanbul to Cotonou since 2014.
United Kingdom	1 August 1960	See Benin–United Kingdom relations Benin established diplomatic relations with the United Kingdom on 1 August 1960.: Benin does not maintain an embassy in the United Kingdom.; The United Kingdom is not accredited to Benin through an embassy; the UK develops relations through its high commission in Accra, Ghana.; Both countries share common membership of the Atlantic co-operation pact, the International Criminal Court, and the World Trade Organization. Bilaterally the two countries have an Investment Agreement.
United States	1 August 1960	See Benin–United States relations Both countries established diplomatic relations on 1 August 1960 The two nations have had an excellent history of relations in the years since Benin embraced democracy. The U.S. Government continues to assist Benin with the improvement of living standards that are key to the ultimate success of Benin's experiment with democratic government and economic liberalization, and are consistent with U.S. values and national interest in reducing poverty and promoting growth. The bulk of the U.S. effort in support of consolidating democracy in Benin is focused on long-term human resource development through U.S. Agency for International Development (USAID) programs.: Benin has an embassy in Washington, D.C.; United States has an embassy in Cotonou.

== See also ==
- List of diplomatic missions in Benin
- List of diplomatic missions of Benin
