= List of diplomatic missions of Benin =

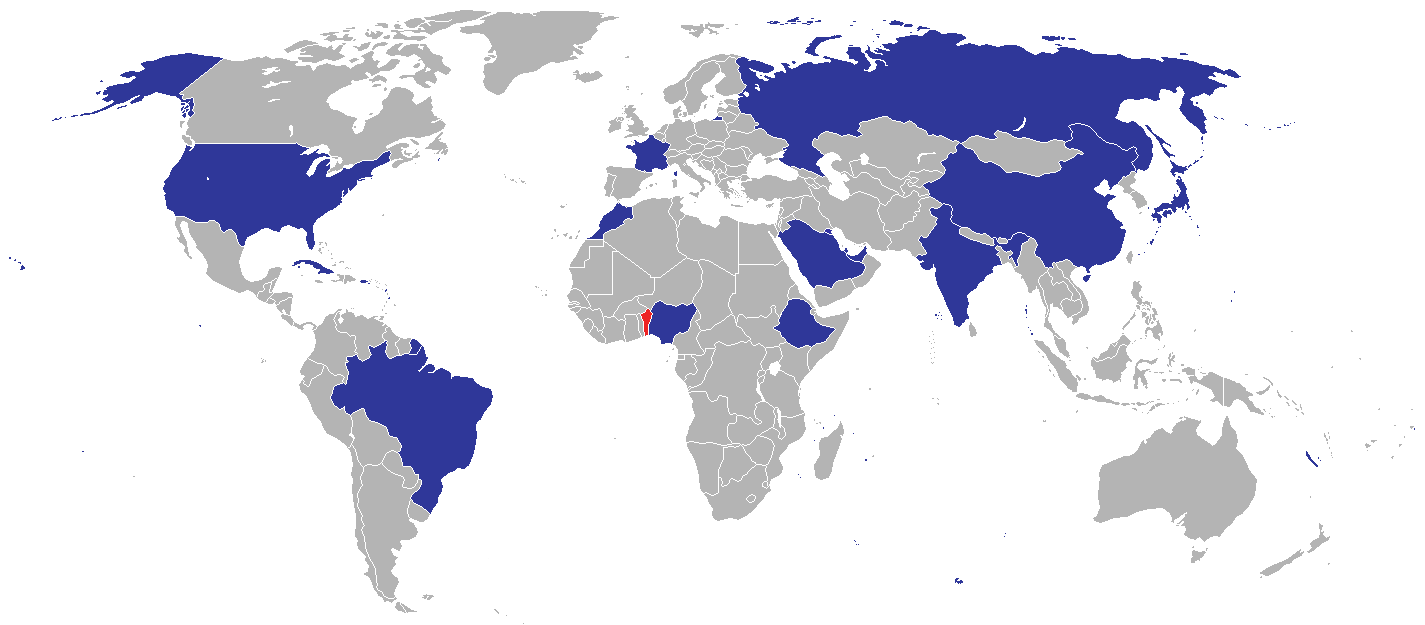
Location of diplomatic missions of Benin

This is a list of diplomatic missions of Benin. Owing to its small size, the Republic of Benin maintains a very modest diplomatic network abroad. Its paramount relationship is with France, the former colonial power.

Honorary consulates are excluded from this list.

== Current missions ==
=== Africa ===
Host country	Host city	Mission	Concurrent accreditation	Ref.
Ethiopia	Addis Ababa	Embassy	Countries: Djibouti; Eritrea; Kenya; Rwanda; Somalia; South Africa; South Sudan; Sudan; Tanzania; International Organizations: African Union; United Nations; United Nations Environment Programme; United Nations Human Settlements Programme	
Morocco	Rabat	Embassy	Countries: Egypt; Libya; Mauritania; Tunisia	
Nigeria	Abuja	Embassy	Countries: Cameroon; Central African Republic; Chad; Equatorial Guinea; Gabon; São Tomé and Príncipe; International Organizations: Economic Community of West African States	
Nigeria	Lagos	Consulate-General	Countries: Cameroon; Central African Republic; Chad; Equatorial Guinea; Gabon; São Tomé and Príncipe; International Organizations: Economic Community of West African States	

=== Americas ===
Host country	Host city	Mission	Concurrent accreditation	Ref.
Brazil	Brasília	Embassy	Countries: Chile; Ecuador; Paraguay	
Cuba	Havana	Embassy	Countries: Guatemala	
United States	Washington, D.C.	Embassy	Countries: Canada; Mexico; International Organizations: Organization of American States (Note: Accredited as an observer mission.)	

=== Asia ===
Host country	Host city	Mission	Concurrent accreditation	Ref.
China	Beijing	Embassy	Countries: Cambodia; Thailand; Vietnam	
India	New Delhi	Embassy		
Japan	Tokyo	Embassy	Countries: Australia; Brunei; Fiji; Indonesia; Malaysia; Maldives; Myanmar; Nepal; New Zealand; Papua New Guinea; Philippines; Singapore; Sri Lanka; Timor-Leste	
Kuwait	Kuwait City	Embassy	Countries: Bahrain	
Qatar	Doha	Embassy		
Saudi Arabia	Riyadh	Embassy	Countries: Jordan; Lebanon; Oman; International Organizations: Organisation of Islamic Cooperation	

=== Europe ===
Host country	Host city	Mission	Concurrent accreditation	Ref.
France	Paris	Embassy	Countries: Albania; Austria; Belgium; Czechia; Denmark; Finland; Germany; Hungary; Iceland; Ireland; Israel; Italy; Latvia; Luxembourg; Malta; Monaco; Netherlands; Norway; Poland; Portugal; Romania; Spain; Sweden; Syria; Turkey; United Kingdom; International Organizations: European Union; Francophonie; United Nations; International Atomic Energy Agency; International Maritime Organization; Organisation of African, Caribbean and Pacific States; UNESCO; United Nations Industrial Development Organization; UN Tourism; World Health Organization; World Trade Organization	
Russia	Moscow	Embassy	Countries: Armenia; Azerbaijan; Belarus; Kazakhstan; Kyrgyzstan; Moldova; Tajikistan; Turkmenistan; Uzbekistan	

=== Multilateral organization ===
Organization	Host city	Host country	Mission	Concurrent accreditation	Ref.
United Nations	New York City	United States	Permanent Mission		

== Gallery ==
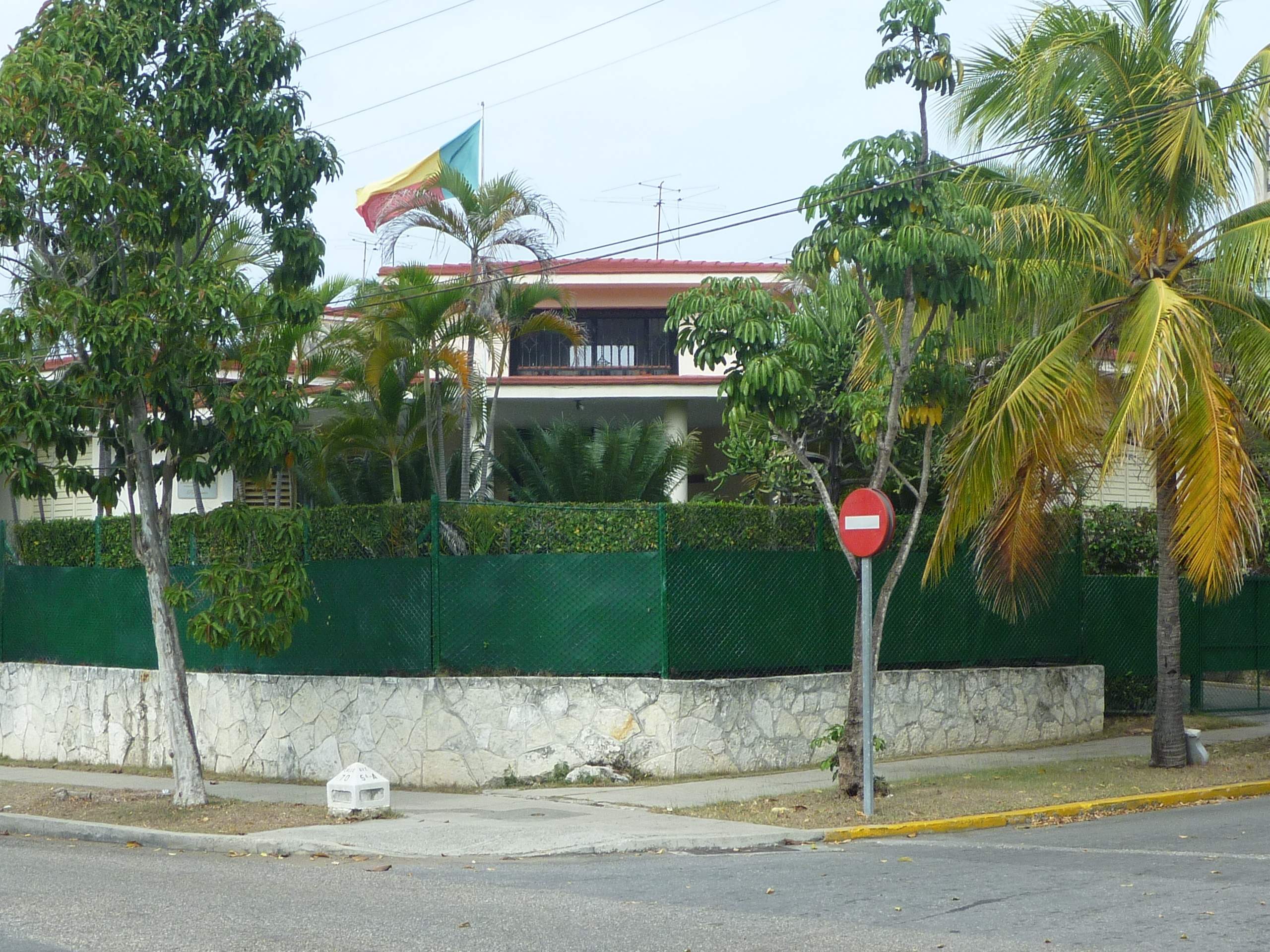
Embassy in Havana

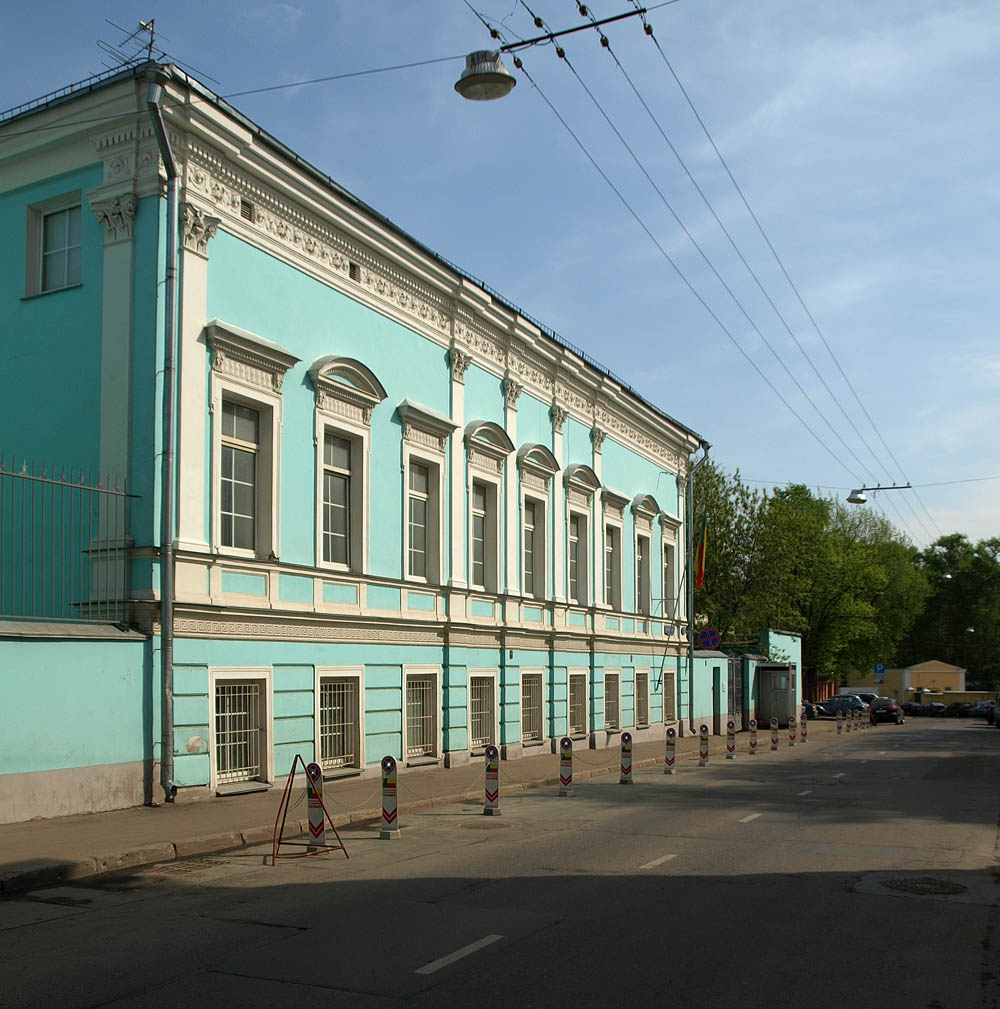
Embassy in Moscow

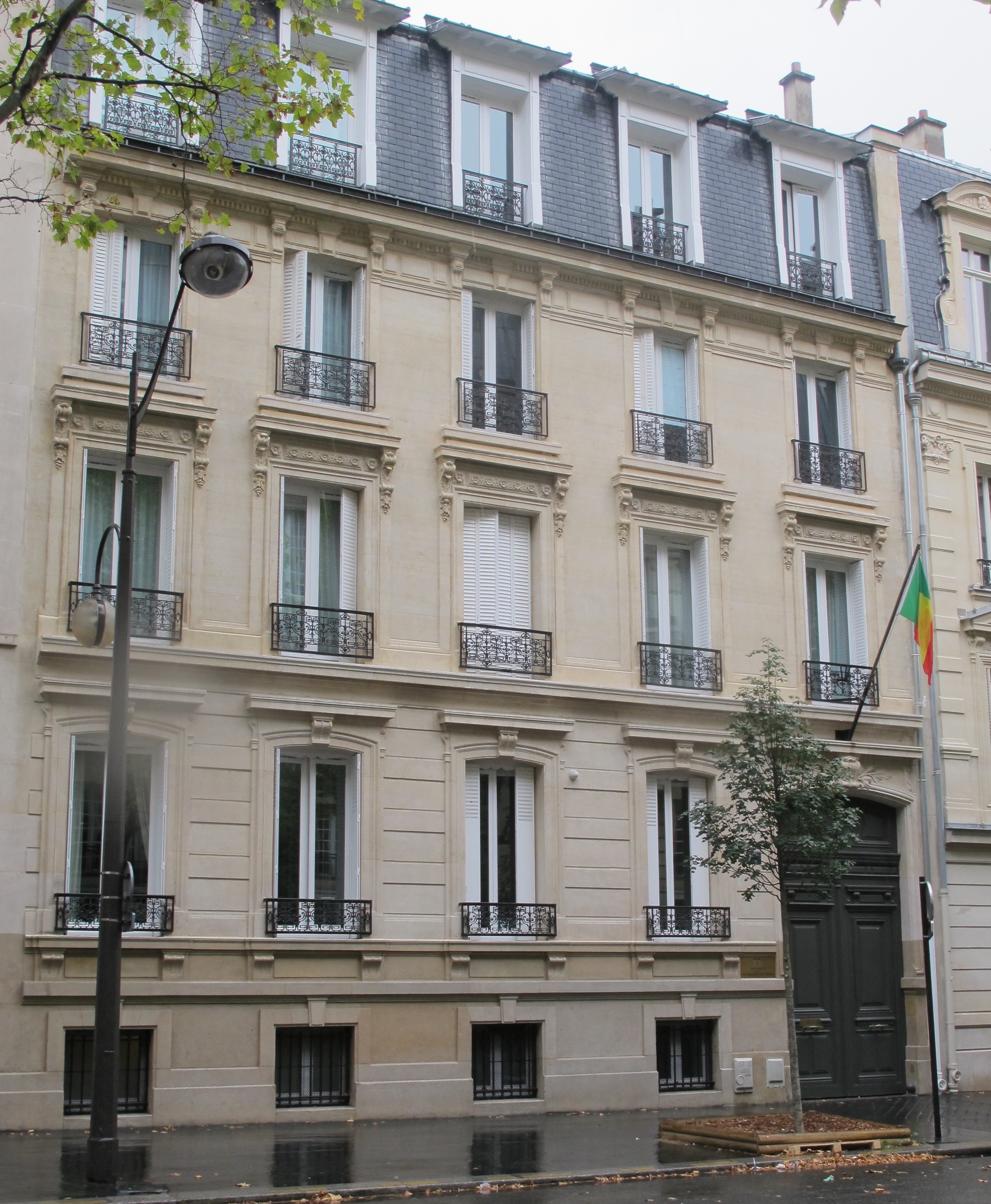
Embassy in Paris

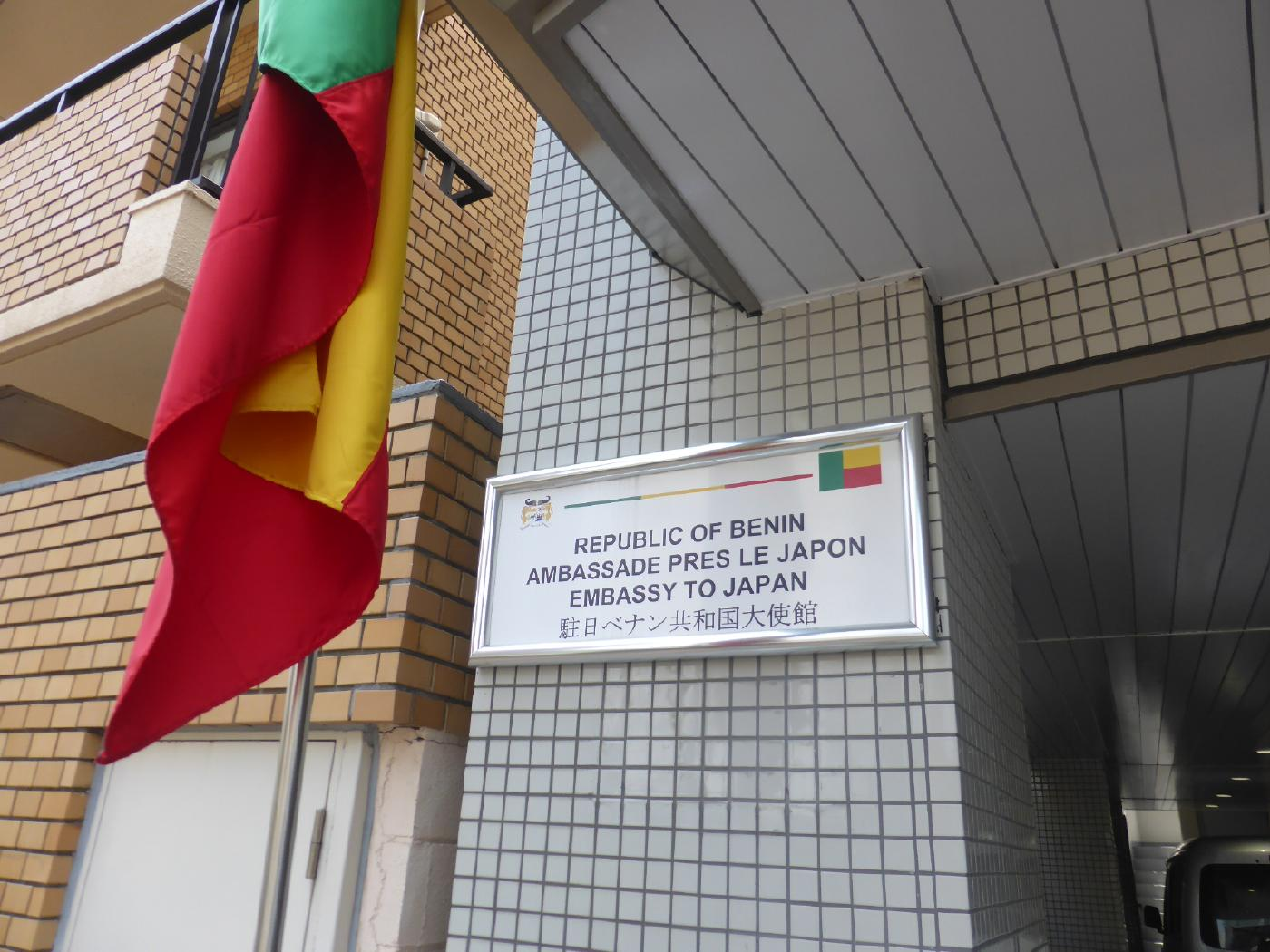
Embassy in Tokyo

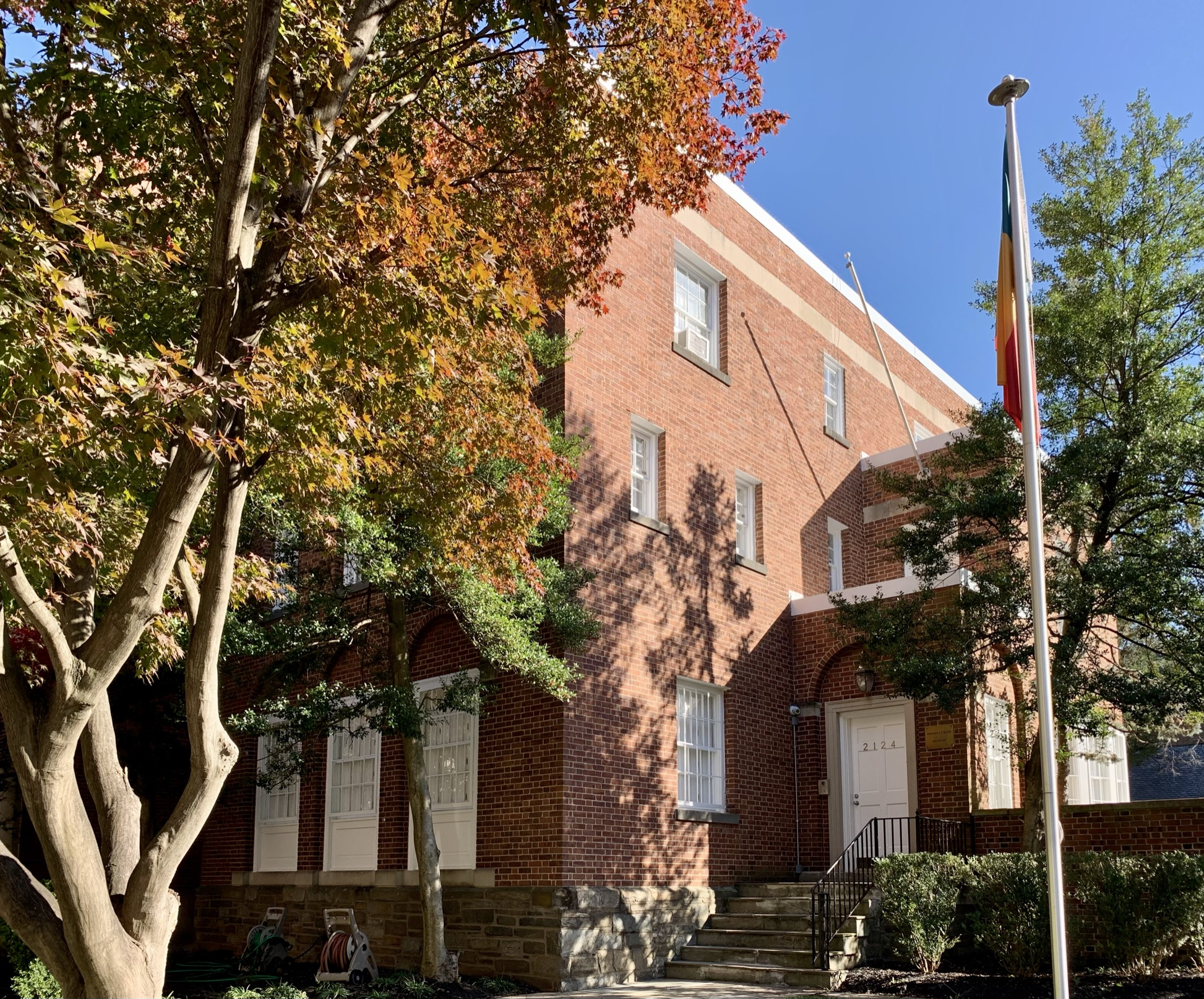
Embassy in Washington, D.C.

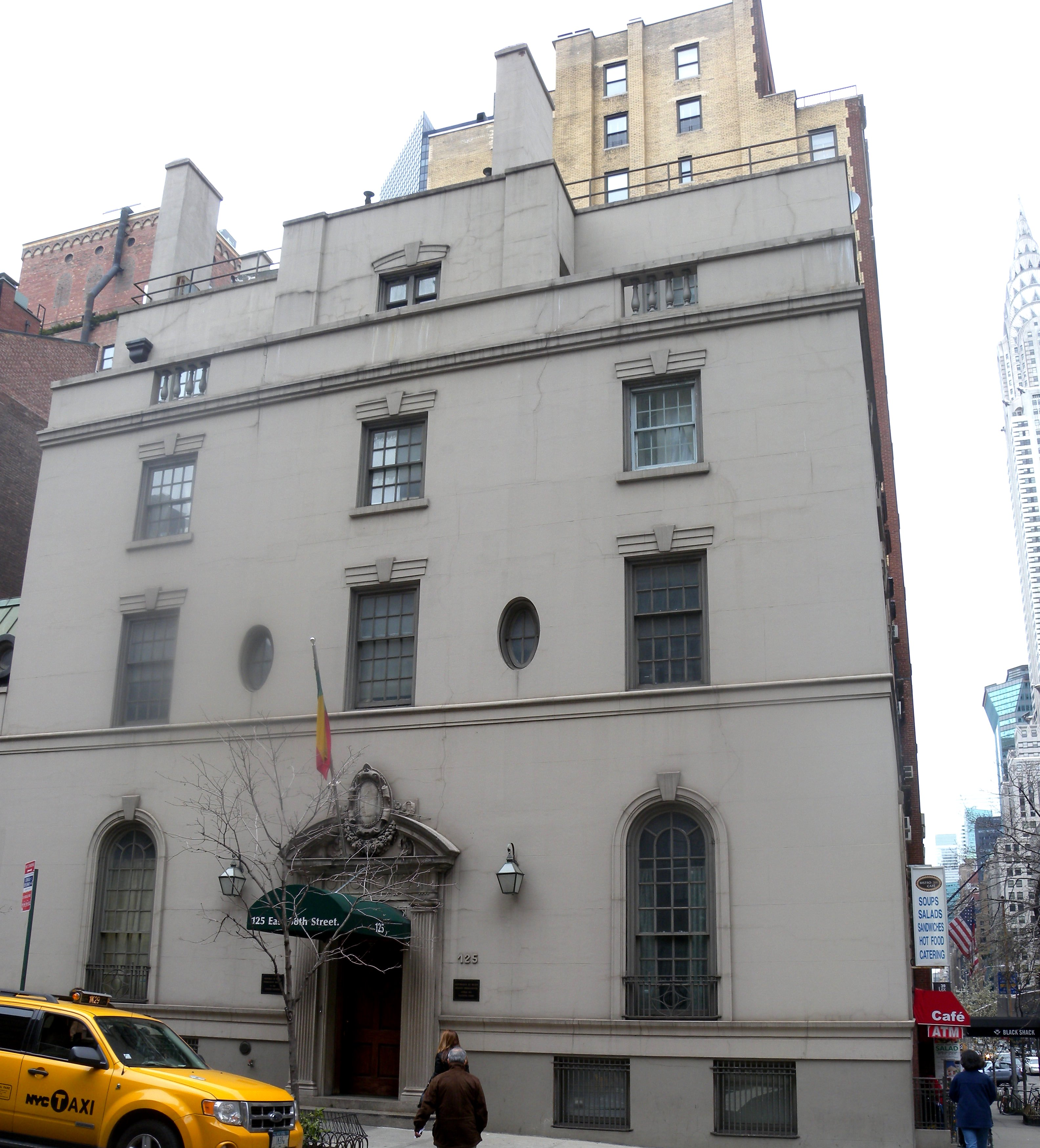
Permanent Mission to the United Nations in New York City

== Closed missions ==
=== Africa ===
Host country	Host city	Mission	Year closed	Ref.
Algeria	Algiers	Embassy	2019	
Congo-Kinshasa	Kinshasa	Consulate-General (Note: Originally an embassy, was downgraded into a consulate-general in the midst of a reduction of Beninese missions in 2016.)	2019	
Equatorial Guinea	Malabo	Embassy	2016	
Gabon	Libreville	Consulate-General	2020	
Ivory Coast	Abidjan	Consulate-General	2020	
Libya	Tripoli	Embassy	2015	
Mali	Bamako	Embassy	2020	
Niger	Niamey	Embassy	2026	
South Africa	Pretoria	Embassy	2020	

=== Americas ===
Host country	Host city	Mission	Year closed	Ref.
Canada	Ottawa	Embassy	2019	
Haiti	Port-au-Prince	Embassy	Unknown	
United States	New York City	Consulate-General	2019	

=== Asia ===
Host country	Host city	Mission	Year closed	Ref.
Iran	Tehran	Embassy	2019	
Turkey	Ankara	Embassy	2020	
United Arab Emirates	Abu Dhabi	Embassy	Unknown	

=== Europe ===
Host country	Host city	Mission	Year closed	Ref.
Belgium	Brussels	Embassy	2020	
Denmark	Copenhagen	Embassy	2020	
Germany	Berlin	Embassy	2020	
Italy	Rome	Embassy	2020	

=== Multilateral organizations ===
Organization	Host city	Host country	Mission	Year closed	Ref.
Francophonie	Paris	France	Permanent Mission	2020	
United Nations	Geneva	Switzerland	Permanent Mission	2020	
UNESCO	Paris	France	Permanent Mission	2020	

== See also ==
- Foreign relations of Benin
- List of diplomatic missions in Benin
- Visa policy of Benin
