= Benin–Netherlands relations =

- Benin: Netherlands

Benin–Netherlands relations are the bilateral relations between Benin and the Netherlands. Diplomatic ties were established on December 26, 1961.

== History ==
Netherlands and Benin have held educational relations since the 1990s. Benin universities have collabarated with Dutch universities including Delft, Maastricht, and Wageningen.

The Netherlands has supports the Institut National de L'Eau, the Institut National Médico-sanitaire, and the Institut National de Sécurité Alimentaire, all of which provide water, health, and food security to Benin. The Netherlands has backed and supported the Orange Knowledge Programme, which helps with food security, sexual and reproductive health and rights.

In October 2022, President of Benin, Patrice Talon, paid a working visit and traveled to the Netherlands and met with Dutch Prime Minister, Mark Rutte, and King Willem-Alexander of the Netherlands. Talon specifically wanted to see healthcare, technical training, and education, specifically in the Port of Rotterdam and how that is structured.

On May 21, 2026, the Netherlands and Benin signed a treaty on tax income. This includes things on withholding taxes, exchange of information, assistance in tax collection, and binding arbitration.

=== Financial aid scandal ===
In 2014, the Netherlands gave $4 million worth of financial aid to Benin, to improve water supplies. After noticing the $4 million dollars went missing, Dutch ambassador to Benin, Jos Van Aggelen, called on the Benin government to investigate the situation. The ambassador stated, "The Dutch government is aware of the consequences that this decision will have on the population in Benin given the progress made in recent years...but we cannot tolerate resources being made available to Benin being managed in this way," Minister for energy and water of Benin, Bethelemy Kassa, resignated over the scandal. President of Benin, Thomas Boni Yayi, pledged severe sanctions against anyone involved. Thomas Boni Yayi apologized to the Netherlands.

== Aid in Benin ==
Dutch ambassador to Benin describes Benin saying, "Benin is a stable, accessible country – a high potential market with a lot of opportunities in agriculture, water, and infrastructure, ready to welcome innovative solutions." He also stated this on Benins water, “Investments in the water sector are not only supported through development cooperation but increasingly through economic cooperation by Invest International and private sector partnerships. Activities financed by Invest International also lead to new investment opportunities for example in coastal protection and port infrastructure.”

The Netherlands looks to help Benin with aid, due to the fact Benin is among the least developed countries in Africa. The Netherlands in Benin have common politics and values in human rights. Along with this, the Netherlands respects Benin for the need to foster stability in Western Africa and the fight against violent extremism. The Netherlands focuses on groups who deal with women's rights, youth, and security in northern Benin.

The Netherlands works with Benin to combat extremist groups in northern Benin, specifically attacking the root causes of their attacks, highlighting poverty. In northern Benin the Netherlands works to combat poverty and bring basic necessities such as food and water to the region. The overall Dutch goal is focused on peace, security, and stability in the region. The Netherlands also works to increase trade missions near the coast, as well as trying to prioritize economic diplomacy. The Netherlands also helps Benin in terms of sexual and reproductive health and rights. The Netherlands is a big donor to health in Benin, often working with Belgium. The Netherlands supports youth programs in Benin, as well as climate resilience.

== Trade ==
In 2024, the Netherlands exported $40.4M worth of goods to Benin. Their top export was refined petroleum which totaled $6.92M. In the same year, Benin exported $4.83M worth of goods to the Netherlands. Their top export was coconutes, brazil nuts, and cashews which totaled $2.27M.

== High-level visits ==
=== High level visits from Benin to the Netherlands ===
- Thomas Boni Yayi (2009)
- Patrice Talon (October 2022)

== Diplomatic missions ==
- Benin has an honorary consulate in The Hague.
- The Netherlands has an embassy in Cotonou.

== See also ==
- Foreign relations of Benin
- Foreign relations of the Netherlands
