= List of ambassadors of Turkey to Benin =

The list of ambassadors of Turkey to Benin provides a chronological record of individuals who have served as the diplomatic representatives of the Republic of Turkey to the Republic of Benin.

== List of ambassadors ==
Ambassador	Term start	Term end
Turgut Rauf Kural	31 October 2014	17 April 2018
Kemal Onur Özçeri	3 December 2018	1 February 2023
Mesut Koç	1 February 2023	Present

== See also ==
- Benin–Turkey relations
