= Visa requirements for Beninese citizens =

Administrative entry restrictions

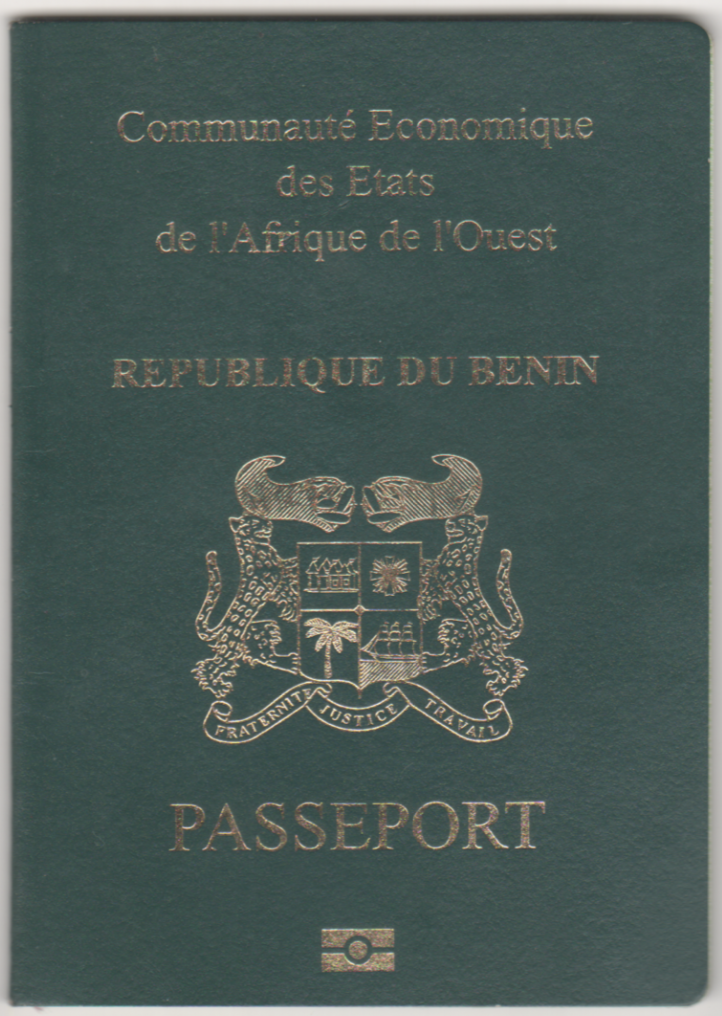
Beninese passport

Visa requirements for Beninese citizens are administrative entry restrictions by the authorities of other states placed on citizens of Benin. As of 2026, Beninese citizens had visa-free or visa on arrival access to 65 countries and territories, ranking the Beninese passport 68th in terms of travel freedom according to the Henley Passport Index.

== Visa requirements map ==
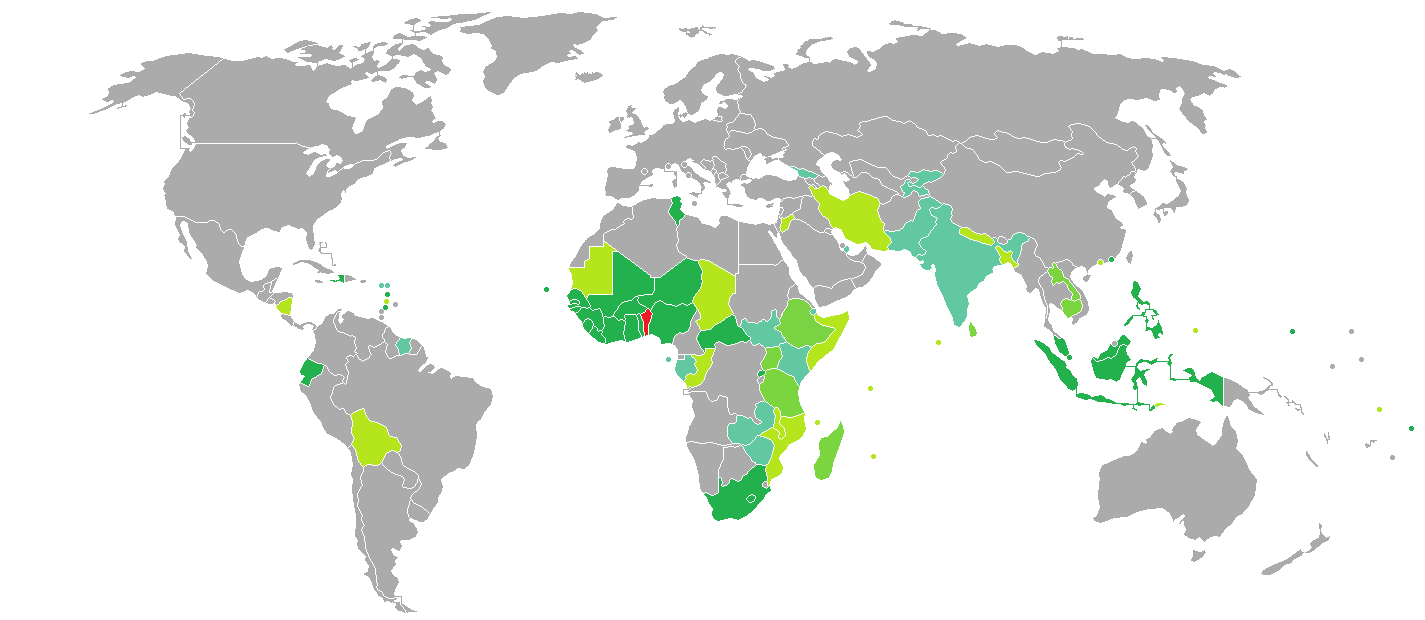
Benin Visa not required Visa obtainable on arrival eVisa Visa available both on arrival or online Pre-arrival visa required

== Visa requirements ==
Country	Visa requirement	Allowed stay	Notes (excluding departure fees)
Afghanistan	eVisa		Visa is not required in case born in Afghanistan or can proof that one of their parents is a national of Afghanistan or born in Afghanistan.; e-Visa : Visitors must arrive at Kabul International (KBL).
Albania	eVisa		Visa is not required for Holders of a valid multiple-entry Schengen, UK or US visa has been previously used once or residence permit of Schengen, UK, US or UAE 10 years.
Algeria	Visa required		
Andorra	Visa required		Although no visa requirements exist, apply the relevant regulations of France or Spain, whichever must be transited to reach Andorra.
Angola	Visa required		
Antigua and Barbuda	eVisa		
Argentina	Visa required		The AVE (High Speed Travel) is open to Beninese citizens holding valid, current ordinary passports traveling to Argentina for tourism. To do so, they must hold a valid category B2/J/B1/O/P (P1-P2-P3)/E/H-1B visa issued by the United States of America.
Armenia	Visa required		
Australia and territories	Online Visitor e600 Visa		
Austria	Visa required		
Azerbaijan	Visa required		
Bahamas	Visa not required	90 days	
Bahrain	eVisa	14 days	
Bangladesh	Visa on arrival	30 days	
Barbados	Visa not required	90 days	
Belarus	Visa required		
Belgium	Visa required		
Belize	Visa required		
Bhutan	eVisa		Visa fee is 40 USD per person and visa application may be processed within 5 business days with duration of stay of 90 days.; e-Visa applicant is also subject to pay Sustainable Development Fee
Bolivia	eVisa / Visa on arrival	90 days	
Bosnia and Herzegovina	Visa required		
Botswana	eVisa		
Brazil	Visa required		
Brunei	Visa required		
Bulgaria	Visa required		
Burkina Faso	Visa not required		
Burundi	Visa on arrival		
Cambodia	eVisa / Visa on arrival	30 days	
Cameroon	eVisa		
Canada	Visa required		US permanent residents (Green card) holders can enter visa free
Cape Verde	Visa not required		
Central African Republic	Visa not required	3 months	
Chad	Visa not required		
Chile	Visa required		
China	Visa required		Visa not required for holders of normal passports endorsed for public affairs.
Colombia	eVisa		May apply online.
Comoros	Visa on arrival	45 days	
Republic of the Congo	Visa on arrival		
Democratic Republic of the Congo	eVisa	90 days	
Costa Rica	Visa required		Holders of a valid multiple-entry visa of any member state of the Schengen Area, Canada, or the United States may enter Cost Rica without a visa for maximum stay of 30 days.
Côte d'Ivoire	Visa not required		
Croatia	Visa required		
Cuba	Visa not required	90 days	
Cyprus	Visa required		
Czech Republic	Visa required		
Denmark	Visa required		
Djibouti	eVisa	31 days	
Dominica	Visa not required	90 days	
Dominican Republic	Visa required		
Ecuador	Visa not required	90 days	
Egypt	Visa required	30 days	
El Salvador	eVisa		
Equatorial Guinea	eVisa		
Eritrea	Visa required		Pre-approved visa can obtain a visa on arrival.
Estonia	Visa required		
Eswatini	Visa required		
Ethiopia	eVisa / Visa on arrival	up to 90 days	Visa on arrival is obtainable only at Addis Ababa Bole International Airport.; e-Visa holders must arrive via Addis Ababa Bole International Airport.; e-Visa is available for 30 or 90 days.
Fiji	Visa required		
Finland	Visa required		
France	Visa required		
Gabon	eVisa		Electronic visa holders must arrive via Libreville International Airport.
Gambia	Visa not required		
Georgia	eVisa	30 days	30 days within any 120 days period
Germany	Visa required		
Ghana	Visa not required		
Greece	Visa required		
Grenada	Visa not required	90 days	90 days within any 180-day period
Guatemala	Visa required		
Guinea	Visa not required		
Guinea-Bissau	Visa not required		
Guyana	Visa required		
Haiti	Visa not required	3 months	
Honduras	Visa required		
Hungary	Visa required		
Iceland	Visa required		
India	eVisa	60 days	e-Visa holders must arrive via 32 designated airports (Note: Ahmedabad; Amritsar; Bagdogra; Bengaluru; Bhubaneswar; Chandigarh; Chennai; Coimbatore; Delhi; Gaya; Goa-Dabolim; Goa-Manohar; Guwahati; Hyderabad; Indore; Jaipur; Kannur; Kochi; Kolkata; Kozhikode; Lucknow; Madurai; Mangaluru; Mumbai; Nagpur; Port Blair; Pune; Surat; Thiruvananthapuram; Tiruchirappalli; Varanasi; Visakhapatnam) or 5 designated seaports. (Note: Chennai; Cochin; Mormugao (Goa); Mumbai; Mangalore); An Indian e-Tourist Visa may only be obtained twice within 1 calendar year.; Foreigners of Pakistani origin or who hold a Pakistani Passport are not eligible for an e-Visa. Foreigners who are not Pakistani nationals, but whose parents or grandparents (either paternal or maternal) were born in, or were permanent residents in Pakistan, are also not eligible for an e-Visa.
Indonesia	Visa required		
Iran	eVisa/Visa on arrival	30 days	Conditions apply
Iraq	eVisa	30 days	
Ireland	Visa required		
Israel	Visa required		
Italy	Visa required		
Jamaica	Visa required		
Japan	Visa required		Eligible for an e-Visa if residing in one these countries Australia, Brazil, Cambodia, Canada, India, Saudi Arabia, Singapore, South Africa, Taiwan, United Arab Emirates, United Kingdom, United States.; May apply online
Jordan	Visa required		
Kazakhstan	eVisa		
Kenya	Visa not required	60 days	
Kiribati	Visa required		
North Korea	Visa required		
South Korea	Visa required		30 days visa on arrival if arriving by Jeju
Kuwait	Visa required		e-Visa can be obtained for holders of a Residence Permit issued by a GCC member state under the following conditions: To be 18 years old and over.; The residence permit for a GCC state must be valid for at least another 3 months.; To be accompanied by the sponsor of the residence permit if the sponsor is an individual.; Does not apply to holders of a GCC Student Visa and Non-Skilled Worker Visa
Kyrgyzstan	eVisa		
Laos	eVisa / Visa on arrival	30 days	18 (Note: Savannakhet Airport; Lanetoui - Mengkang (China); Meuangmom - Wan Pong (Myanmar); Banvang - Ban Khok Phai (Thailand); Namngeun - Huay Kon (Thailand); Paksan - Bueng Kan (Thailand); Paktaphan - Pak Saeng (Thailand); Pangmon - Ban Huak (Thailand); Phoudou (Thailand); Dak ta ock - Nam Giang (Vietnam); La Lai (Vietnam); Namkan (Vietnam); Namphao - Cau Treo (Vietnam); Namsoy - Na Meo (Vietnam); Naphao - Cha Lo (Vietnam); Pahang - Long Sap (Vietnam); Panghok - Tây Trang (Vietnam); Phoukeua - Bo Y (Vietnam)) of the 33 border crossings are only open to regular visa holders.; e-Visa may be used to enter Laos through the Luang Prabang, Pakse and Vientiane international airports, 3 Thai-Lao Friendship Bridges (Note: Vientiane (Friendship Bridge 1); Savannakhet (Friendship Bridge 2); Bokeo (Friendship Bridge 4)), in Boten (road and railroad), and in Vientiane (at Khamsavath railway station).; Visa on arrival is available at the Luang Prabang, Pakse and Vientiane international airports, 4 Thai-Lao Friendship Bridges (Note: Vientiane (Friendship Bridge 1); Savannakhet (Friendship Bridge 2); Khammouane (Friendship Bridge 3); Bokeo (Friendship Bridge 4)) and 7 border crossings. (Note: Nongnokkheane - Trapeang Kriel (Cambodia); Boten - Bo han (China); Golden Triangle/Samliemkham (Thailand); Khamsavath railway station (Thailand); Namheuang - Ban Na Kraseng (Thailand); Vang tao - Chongmek (Thailand); Dansavan - Lao Bảo (Vietnam))
Latvia	Visa required		
Lebanon	Visa required		In addition to a visa, an approval should be obtained from the Immigration department of the General Directorate for General Security (La Surete Generale).
Lesotho	eVisa		
Liberia	Visa not required		
Libya	Visa not required	90 days	
Liechtenstein	Visa required		
Lithuania	Visa required		
Luxembourg	Visa required		
Madagascar	eVisa / Visa on arrival	90 days	
Malawi	eVisa/ Visa on arrival	30 days	
Malaysia	Visa not required	30 days	
Maldives	Free Visa on arrival	30 days	
Mali	Visa not required		
Malta	Visa required		
Marshall Islands	Visa required		
Mauritania	eVisa		
Mauritius	Visa not required	90 days	
Mexico	Visa required		Visa is not required for Holders of a valid visa of Canada, US, UK or a Schengen State and Permanent residence of Canada, Chile, Colombia, Schengen State, Japan, UK, US; Entry may be refused by immigration officials for individuals who were previously denied a US visa, even if holding a valid Mexican visa.
Micronesia	Visa not required	30 days	
Moldova	eVisa		visa not required if holding a valid visa /residence permit that is issued by a European Union member state or Schengen Area, Canada, Ireland, UK, US
Monaco	Visa required		
Mongolia	eVisa		
Montenegro	Visa required		Visa not required for holders of a valid Australia, Japan, Canada, New Zealand, Ireland, US, UK or a Schengen Visa.; Holders of residence permit in the United Arab Emirates may enter, in Montenegro for a duration of 10 days
Morocco	Visa required		May apply for an e-Visa if holding a valid visa or a residency document issued by one of the following countries: Schengen Area, Australia, Canada, Ireland, New Zealand, United Kingdom, United States a residency document issued by Cyprus, Japan, United Arab Emirates.
Mozambique	eVisa / Visa on arrival	30 days	Visa on arrival is no longer available to citizens of countries that host an embassy of Mozambique.
Myanmar	Visa required		
Namibia	eVisa / Visa on arrival		
Nauru	Visa required		
Nepal	eVisa / Visa on arrival	90 days	
Netherlands	Visa required		
New Zealand	Visa required		Holders of an Australian Permanent Resident Visa or Resident Return Visa may be granted a New Zealand Resident Visa on arrival permitting indefinite stay (pursuant to the Trans-Tasman Travel Arrangement), subject to meeting character requirements and obtaining an Electronic Travel Authority prior to departure.
Nicaragua	Visa on arrival	90 days	
Niger	Visa not required		
Nigeria	Visa not required		
North Macedonia	Visa required		
Norway	Visa required		
Oman	eVisa		
Pakistan	eVisa		Online Visa eligible.; Electronic Travel Authorization to obtain a visa on arrival for business purposes.
Palau	Free Visa on arrival	30 days	
Panama	Visa required		Visa is not required for holders of a multiple-entry visa valid for at least 6 months at the time of entry or permanent residency issued by Australia, Canada, European Union, Japan, Singapore, South Korea, US, UK.
Papua New Guinea	eVisa	60 days	May apply for an e-visa under the type of "Tourist - Own Itinerary"
Paraguay	Visa required		
Peru	Visa required		
Philippines	Visa not required	30 days	
Poland	Visa required		
Portugal	Visa required		
Qatar	eVisa		
Romania	Visa required		
Russia	Visa required		
Rwanda	Visa not required	90 days	
Saint Kitts and Nevis	eVisa		
Saint Lucia	Visa on arrival	6 weeks	
Saint Vincent and the Grenadines	Visa not required	1 month	
Samoa	Visa not required	60 days	
San Marino	Visa required		
São Tomé and Príncipe	eVisa		
Saudi Arabia	Visa required		Residents of GCC countries can apply for Saudi e-Visas online and residents of the United States, United Kingdom and European Union may apply for a visa on arrival
Senegal	Visa not required	90 days	
Serbia	Visa required		
Seychelles	Free Visitor's Permit on arrival	3 months	
Sierra Leone	Visa not required		
Singapore	Visa not required	30 days	
Slovakia	Visa required		
Slovenia	Visa required		
Solomon Islands	Visa required		
Somalia	eVisa	30 days	
South Africa	Visa not required	30 days	
South Sudan	eVisa		Obtainable online; Printed visa authorization must be presented at the time of travel
Spain	Visa required		
Sri Lanka	ETA / Visa on arrival	30 days	The standard visitor visa allows a stay of 60 days within any 6-month period.; Visa fees (for Standard visitor visa): SAARC - USD 35; Non SAARC - USD 75; e-Visa categories will be charged an additional USD 18.50 service fee.; If transiting from any of the Sri Lankan airports, An e-Visa is exempted (2 day transit period).
Sudan	Visa required		
Suriname	eVisa		
Sweden	Visa required		
Switzerland	Visa required		
Syria	eVisa		
Tajikistan	eVisa	45 days	
Tanzania	eVisa / Visa on arrival		
Thailand	eVisa		
Timor-Leste	Visa on arrival	30 days	Not available at all entry points.
Togo	Visa not required		
Tonga	Visa required		
Trinidad and Tobago	Visa required		
Tunisia	Visa not required		
Turkey	Visa required		
Turkmenistan	eVisa		
Tuvalu	Free Visa on arrival	1 month	
Uganda	Visa on arrival		May apply online.
Ukraine	Visa required		
United Arab Emirates	eVisa		Possible visa on arrival for 96 hours
United Kingdom and Crown dependencies	Visa required		
United States	Visa required		
Uruguay	Visa required		
Uzbekistan	Visa required		
Vanuatu	Visa required		
Vatican City	Visa required		Open borders but de facto follows Italian visa policy.
Venezuela	Visa required		
Vietnam	eVisa	90 days	Visa free for 30 days when visiting Phú Quốc
Yemen	Visa required		
Zambia	eVisa	90 days	
Zimbabwe	eVisa	90 days	

== Dependent, disputed, or restricted territories ==
Unrecognized or partially recognized countries

Territory	Conditions of access	Notes
Abkhazia	Visa required	
Kosovo	Visa required	Do not need a visa a holder of a valid biometric residence permit issued by one of the Schengen member states or a valid multi-entry Schengen Visa, a holder of a valid Laissez-Passer issued by United Nations Organizations, NATO, OSCE, Council of Europe or European Union a holder of a valid travel documents issued by EU Member and Schengen States, United States of America, Canada, Australia and Japan based on the 1951 Convention on Refugee Status or the 1954 Convention on the Status of Stateless Persons, as well as holders of valid travel documents for foreigners (max. 15 days stay)
Northern Cyprus	Visa not required	
Palestine	Visa not required	Arrival by sea to Gaza Strip not allowed.
Sahrawi Arab Democratic Republic		Undefined visa regime in the Western Sahara controlled territory.
Somaliland	Visa on arrival	30 days for 30 US dollars, payable on arrival.
South Ossetia	Visa not required	Multiple entry visa to Russia and three day prior notification are required to enter South Ossetia.
Taiwan	Visa required	
Transnistria	Visa not required	Registration required after 24h.

Dependent and autonomous territories

Territory	Conditions of access	Notes
China
Hong Kong	Visa not required	14 days
Macau	Visa on arrival	
Denmark
Faroe Islands	Visa required	
Greenland	Visa required	
France
French Guiana	Visa required	
French Polynesia	Visa required	
(France) French West Indies	Visa required	Includes overseas departments of Guadeloupe and Martinique and overseas collectivities of Saint Barthélemy and Saint Martin.
Mayotte	Visa required	
New Caledonia	Visa required	
Réunion	Visa required	
Saint Pierre and Miquelon	Visa required	
Wallis and Futuna	Visa required	
Netherlands
Aruba	Visa required	
Caribbean Netherlands	Visa required	Includes Bonaire, Sint Eustatius and Saba.
Curaçao	Visa required	
Sint Maarten	Visa required	
New Zealand
Cook Islands	Visa not required	31 days
Niue	Visa not required	30 days
Tokelau	Visa required	
United Kingdom
Akrotiri and Dhekelia	Visa required	
Anguilla	Visa required	Holders of a valid visa issued by the United Kingdom do not require a visa.
Bermuda	Visa not required	
British Indian Ocean Territory	Special permit required	Special permit required.
British Virgin Islands	Visa required	
Cayman Islands	Visa required	
Falkland Islands	Visa required	
Gibraltar	Visa required	
Montserrat	eVisa	
Pitcairn Islands	Visa not required	14 days visa free and landing fee US$35 or tax of US$5 if not going ashore.
Ascension Island	eVisa	3 months within any year period
Saint Helena	eVisa	
Tristan da Cunha	Permission required	Permission to land required for 15/30 pounds sterling (yacht/ship passenger) for Tristan da Cunha Island or 20 pounds sterling for Gough Island, Inaccessible Island or Nightingale Islands.
South Georgia and the South Sandwich Islands	Permit required	Pre-arrival permit from the Commissioner required (72 hours/1 month for 110/160 pounds sterling).
Turks and Caicos Islands	Visa required	Holders of a valid visa issued by Canada, United Kingdom or the USA do not required a visa for a maximum stay of 90 days.
United States
American Samoa	Visa required	
Guam	Visa required	
Northern Mariana Islands	Visa required	
Puerto Rico	Visa required	
U.S. Virgin Islands	Visa required	
Antarctica and adjacent islands
Special permits required for Bouvet Island, British Antarctic Territory, French Southern and Antarctic Lands, Argentine Antarctica, (Australia) Australian Antarctic Territory, (Antártica Chilena Province) Chilean Antarctic Territory, (Australia) Heard Island and McDonald Islands, (Norway) Peter I Island, (Norway) Queen Maud Land, (New Zealand) Ross Dependency.

== Non-visa restrictions ==
=== Blank passport pages ===
Many countries require a minimum number of blank pages to be available in the passport being presented, typically one or two pages. Endorsement pages, which often appear after the visa pages, are not counted as being valid or available.

=== Vaccination ===
Cover of the new International Certificate of Vaccination issued by the Bureau of Quarantine in the Philippines since 2021

The African countries of Angola, Benin, Burkina Faso, Burundi, Cameroon, Central African Republic, Democratic Republic of the Congo, Republic of the Congo, Côte d'Ivoire, Gabon, Ghana, Guinea-Bissau, Mali, Niger, Sierra Leone and Togo, South Sudan and Uganda, along with French Guiana in South America, require all incoming passengers older than nine months to one year, to have a current International Certificate of Vaccination or Prophylaxis.

Some other countries require vaccination only if the passenger is coming from an infected area or has visited one recently or has transited for 12 hours in those countries: Algeria, Botswana, Cabo Verde, Chad, Djibouti, Egypt, Eswatini, Ethiopia, Gambia, Ghana, Guinea, Lesotho, Libya, Equatorial Guinea, Eritrea, Madagascar, Malawi, Mauritania, Mauritius, Mozambique, Namibia, Nigeria, Papua New Guinea, Seychelles, Somalia, South Africa, Sudan, Tunisia, Uganda, Tanzania, Zambia and Zimbabwe.

=== Passport validity length ===
Very few countries, such as Paraguay, just require a valid passport on arrival.

However many countries and groupings now require only an identity card – especially from their neighbours. Other countries may have special bilateral arrangements that depart from the generality of their passport validity length policies to shorten the period of passport validity required for each other's citizens or even accept passports that have already expired (but not been cancelled).

Some countries, such as Japan, Ireland and the United Kingdom, require a passport valid throughout the period of the intended stay.

In the absence of specific bilateral agreements, countries requiring passports to be valid for at least 6 more months on arrival include Afghanistan, Algeria, Anguilla, Bahrain, Bhutan, Botswana, British Virgin Islands, Brunei, Cambodia, Cameroon, Cape Verde, Cayman Islands, Central African Republic, Chad, Comoros, Costa Rica, Côte d'Ivoire, Curaçao, Ecuador, Egypt, El Salvador, Equatorial Guinea, Fiji, Gabon, Guinea Bissau, Guyana, Haiti, India, Indonesia, Iran, Iraq, Israel, Jordan, Kenya, Kiribati, Kuwait, Laos, Madagascar, Malaysia, Marshall Islands, Mongolia, Myanmar, Namibia, Nepal, Nicaragua, Nigeria, Oman, Palau, Papua New Guinea, Peru, Philippines, Qatar, Rwanda, Samoa, Saudi Arabia, Singapore, Solomon Islands, Somalia, Sri Lanka, Sudan, Suriname, Tanzania, Thailand, Timor-Leste, Tokelau, Tonga, Turkey, Tuvalu, Uganda, United Arab Emirates, Vanuatu, Venezuela, and Vietnam.

Countries requiring passports valid for at least 4 months on arrival include Micronesia and Zambia.

Countries requiring passports with a validity of at least 3 months beyond the date of intended departure include Azerbaijan, Bosnia and Herzegovina, Honduras, Montenegro, Nauru, Moldova and New Zealand. Similarly, the EEA countries of Iceland, Liechtenstein, Norway, all European Union countries (except Ireland) together with Switzerland also require 3 months validity beyond the date of the bearer's intended departure unless the bearer is an EEA or Swiss national.

Countries requiring passports valid for at least 3 months on arrival include Albania, North Macedonia, Panama, and Senegal.

Bermuda requires passports to be valid for at least 45 days upon entry.

Countries that require a passport validity of at least one month beyond the date of intended departure include Eritrea, Hong Kong, Lebanon, Macau, the Maldives and South Africa.

==== Maximum passport age ====
Countries of the Schengen area require non-EU passports to be less than 10 years old upon entry.

=== Criminal record ===
Some countries, including Australia, Canada, Fiji, New Zealand and the United States, routinely deny entry to non-citizens who have a criminal record, while others impose restrictions depending on the type of conviction and the length of the sentence.

=== Persona non grata ===
The government of a country can declare a diplomat persona non grata, banning them from entering the country or expelling them if they have already entered. In non-diplomatic use, the authorities of a country may also declare a foreigner persona non grata permanently or temporarily, usually because of unlawful activity.

=== Israeli stamps ===
Kuwait, Lebanon, Libya, and Yemen do not allow entry to people with passport stamps from Israel or whose passports have either a used or an unused Israeli visa, or where there is evidence of previous travel to Israel such as entry or exit stamps from neighbouring border posts in transit countries such as Jordan and Egypt.

To circumvent this Arab League boycott of Israel, the Israeli immigration services have now mostly ceased to stamp foreign nationals' passports on either entry to or exit from Israel (unless the entry is for some work-related purposes). Since 15 January 2013, Israel no longer stamps foreign passports at Ben Gurion Airport. Passports are still (as of 22 June 2017) stamped at Erez when passing into and out of Gaza.

Iran refuses admission to holders of passports containing an Israeli visa or stamp that is less than 12 months old.

=== Biometrics ===
Several countries mandate that all travellers, or all foreign travellers, be fingerprinted on arrival and will refuse admission to or even arrest travellers who refuse to comply. In some countries, such as the United States, this may apply even to transit passengers who merely wish to change planes rather than go landside.

Fingerprinting countries/regions include Afghanistan, Argentina, Brunei, Cambodia, China, Ethiopia, Ghana, Guinea, India, Japan, Kenya (both fingerprints and a photo are taken), Malaysia upon entry and departure, Mongolia, Saudi Arabia, the Schengen Area, Singapore, South Korea, Taiwan, Thailand, Uganda, the United Arab Emirates and the United States.

Many countries also require a photo be taken of people entering the country. The United States, which does not fully implement exit control formalities at its land frontiers (although long mandated by its own legislation), intends to implement facial recognition for passengers departing from international airports to identify people who overstay their visa.

Together with fingerprint and face recognition, iris scanning is one of three biometric identification technologies internationally standardised since 2006 by the International Civil Aviation Organization (ICAO) for use in e-passports and the United Arab Emirates conducts iris scanning on visitors who need to apply for a visa. The United States Department of Homeland Security has announced plans to greatly increase the biometric data it collects at US borders. In 2018, Singapore began trials of iris scanning at three land and maritime immigration checkpoints.

== See also ==
- Visa policy of Benin
- ECOWAS passport
