= Benin–Kenya relations =

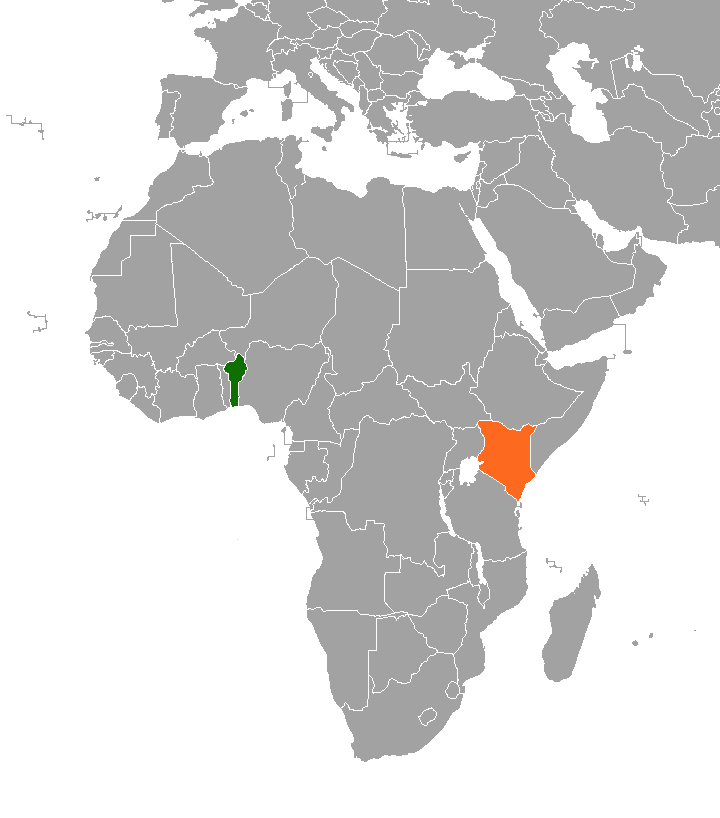
- Benin: Kenya

Benin–Kenya relations are bilateral relations between Benin and Kenya. Both nations are members of the African Union and the United Nations.

== History ==
In 2017, President Patrice Talon of Benin made his first state visit to Nairobi. He held talks with President Kenyatta where they discussed deepening both trade and diplomatic ties.

== Trade ==
Both countries enjoy cordial relations. Nationals of both countries can obtain Visas at the Port of Entry. To increase trade a Joint Commission for Co-operation (JCC) between the two countries is in the works.

Annual trade is considered to be worth Kes. 94 million (US$1 million- US$1.5 million) depending on exchange rates. In 2009, Kenya imported goods worth Kes. 61 million (US$668,000) and exported goods worth Kes. 33 million (US$361,000) to Benin. The balance of trade favoured Benin then.

In 2015, the balance of trade was in favour of Kenya with Kenya exporting goods worth Kes. 377.35 million (US$3.65 million) and Benin exporting a minimal number of goods to Kenya.

Main goods that Kenya exports to Benin are medicines, sugar confectionery, jute and other textiles.

Kenya's main imports from Benin include; Liquefied propane and butane, rotating electric plant and parts, paper and art works.

== Diplomatic missions ==
- Benin is accredited to Kenya from its embassy in Addis Ababa, Ethiopia.
- Kenya is accredited to Benin from its high commission in Abuja, Nigeria.

== See also ==
- Foreign relations of Benin
- Foreign relations of Kenya
