= Beninese passport =

Passport issued to citizens of Benin

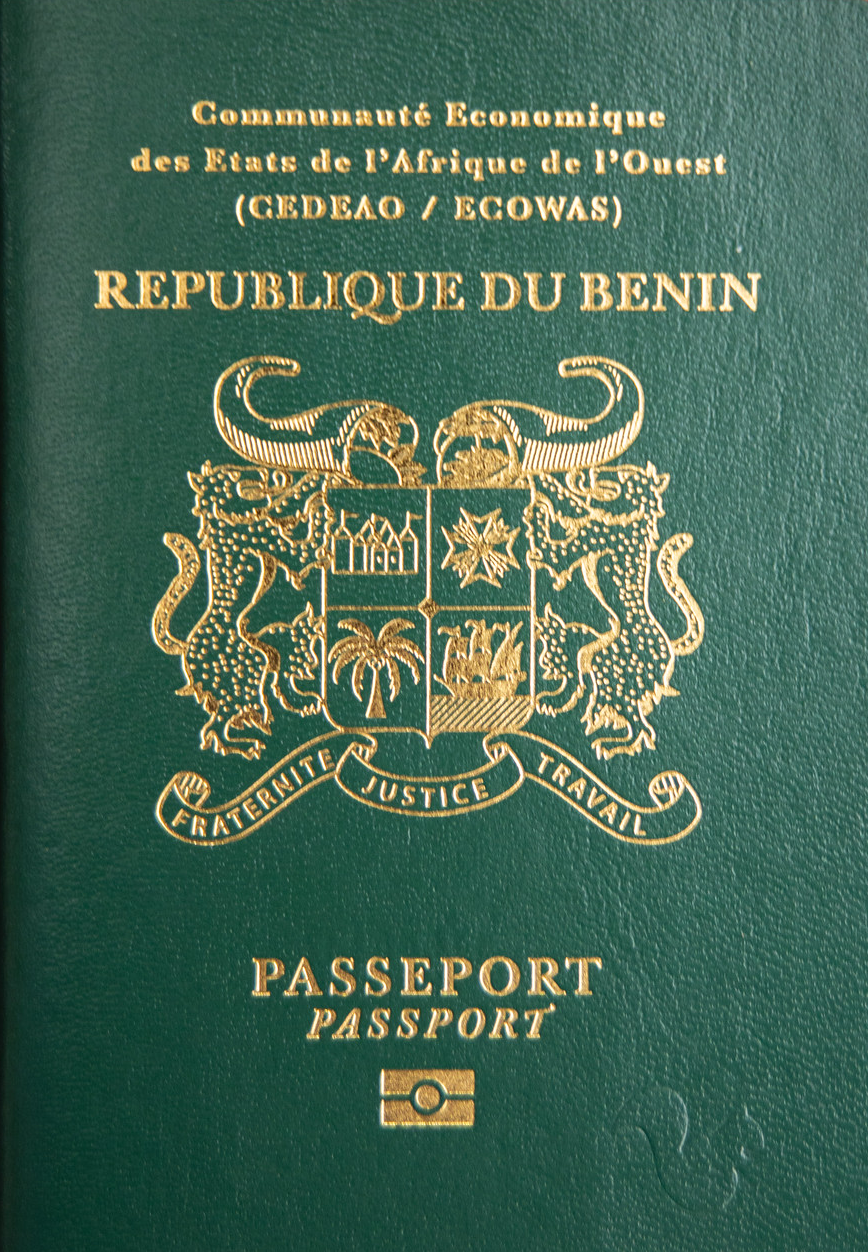
- Front cover of the current Beninese passport (with chip)
- Type: Passport
- Issued by: Benin
- Purpose: Identification
- Eligibility: Beninese citizenship
- Expiration: 6 years

The Beninese passport is issued to citizens of the Benin for international travel.

The Beninese passport is currently ranked 72nd place on the Guide Passport Index. It provides visa-free access to 67 destinations. Beninese passport holders have visa-free access and visas on arrival to countries such as Philippines, Singapore, and Sri Lanka.

== Physical appearance ==
The regular biometric Beninese passport is a travel document issued to people of Beninese nationality. The document contains thirty-two pages and complies with international security standards. The cover of the passport is a dark green (olive) colour. In the lower central part is the national coat of arms. At the bottom is the inscription "Passport" (fr. Passeport). Above the coat of arms is 'Republic of Benin' (fr. Republique du Benin). The validity period of an ordinary biometric passport is six years.

== Languages ==
The data page/information page is printed in French and English.

== See also ==
- List of passports
- Visa requirements for Beninese citizens
