= Benin–United Kingdom relations =

- Benin: United Kingdom

Benin–United Kingdom relations encompass the diplomatic, economic, and historical interactions between the Republic of Benin and the United Kingdom of Great Britain and Northern Ireland. Both countries established diplomatic relations on 27 June 1960, then known as Dahomey.

Both countries share common membership of the Atlantic Co-operation Pact, the International Criminal Court, the United Nations, and the World Trade Organization. Bilaterally the two countries have an Investment Agreement.

== History ==
The relationship between Benin and the United Kingdom has its roots in the late sixteenth century, with early interactions primarily revolving around trade and religion. Initially, British traders, along with other Europeans, engaged with the Kingdom of Benin in commerce that included the exchange of goods such as pepper, ivory, textiles, and firearms. The Oba of Benin actively negotiated with British merchants, maintaining a system of controlled access and protocols for visiting traders. This early era of interaction laid the groundwork for a long period of trading partnership and sporadic Christian missionary activity, such as the establishment of schools by British religious societies.

Throughout the nineteenth century, relations between Benin and Britain became increasingly strained amid Britain’s colonial expansion in West Africa. Disputes over trading privileges and the British desire for open access to Benin’s markets culminated in escalating tensions. In 1892, British officials imposed the so-called Gallwey Treaty on Benin, seeking to formalize commercial ties and extend British influence in the region. However, the Oba and his court resisted full compliance, maintaining traditional customs and limiting foreign intervention.

This friction reached a critical point in 1897 after a British diplomatic and trading mission to Benin City was ambushed—an action reportedly carried out without the Oba's knowledge—and most of the British delegation killed. In response, the British organized the Punitive Expedition, a military campaign that resulted in the destruction and looting of Benin City, the exile of Oba Ovonramwen, and the annexation of the kingdom into the British colonial sphere. Much of the treasures and ceremonial art, including the famed Benin Bronzes, were seized and later distributed to European museums and collectors, a legacy that still influences cultural relations today.

== Modern relations ==
Following Nigeria’s independence in 1960, the modern Republic of Benin established formal diplomatic relations with the United Kingdom. The UK maintains diplomatic representation in the region primarily through non-resident embassies and official missions, reflecting the limited but ongoing political and economic engagement between the two countries. The Embassy of Benin is located in London, serving the needs of Beninese nationals and handling diplomatic, trade, and consular matters.

Key aspects of contemporary diplomatic relations involve support for Benin’s democratic governance, initiatives in public health and education, and collaboration on issues like security, human rights, and regional stability. The UK works closely with Benin and its West African neighbors on anti-corruption measures, security partnerships, and humanitarian assistance programs.

== Diplomatic missions ==
- Benin does not maintain an embassy in the United Kingdom.
- The United Kingdom is not accredited to Benin through an embassy; the UK develops relations through its high commission in Accra, Ghana.

== See also ==
- Benin Expedition of 1897
- Foreign relations of Benin
- Foreign relations of the United Kingdom

== Bibliography ==
- Home, Robert (1982). City of Blood Revisited • A new look at the Benin expedition of 1897. London: Rex Collings, Ltd.
