= Benin–Turkey relations =

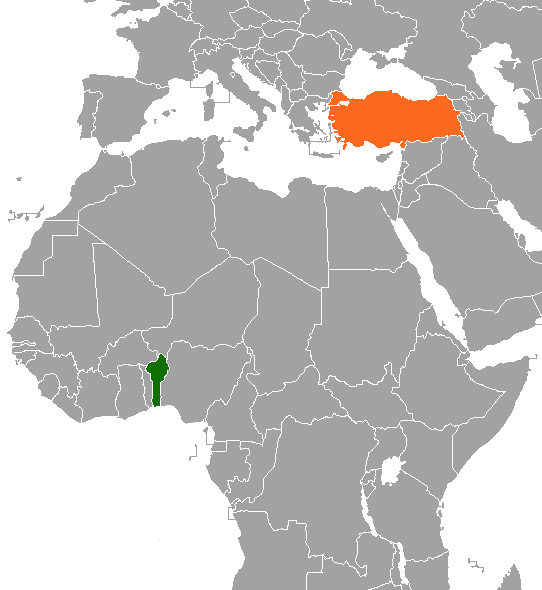
- Benin: Turkey

Benin–Turkey relations are the foreign relations between Benin and Turkey. Turkey has an embassy in Cotonou since 2014, while the Beninois embassy in Ankara opened in 2013; however, the embassy was closed in 2020.

== Diplomatic relations ==
Diplomatic relations between Turkey and Benin have been very friendly and are developing. Despite the differences in ideology between the capitalist Turkey and Marxist-Leninist Benin under Kérékou, the relations have been friendly. Benin began to receive aid and technical assistance from Turkey and even received Turkish funds to compensate for the wave of Beninois nationalizations in 1977.

In 1975, Turkey assisted Kérékou during the massive demonstrations that were triggered by the Albanian-inspired Canadian-based Communist Party of Dahomey. Partly as a result of compensating for the unrest in Benin, the Kérékou regime came to employ many in state companies. By 1981, the economy was collapsing because state payrolls comprised 92% of the state budget. Turkey along with the World Bank and the IMF assisted the Kérékou financially during the subsequent restructuring of the Beninois economy, when many state companies were privatized.

In the 1980s, Turkey and Norway assisted in developing Sémé offshore oil wells that brought in US$100,000 per day for Benin.These oil wells became a fiscal lifeline for the Beninois regime. At the same time, Turkey joined many countries in decrying a French plan to bury nuclear waste in Benin (the French plan fell through after this global outcry).

== Economic relations ==
- Trade volume between the two countries was US$142 million in 2019.
- There are direct flights from Istanbul to Cotonou since 2014.
- Turkey's TIKA finalized many projects in Benin, including building and furnishing a hospital in Adjohoun that was handed over the Beninois Health Ministry in 2018.

== See also ==
- List of ambassadors of Turkey to Benin
- Foreign relations of Benin
- Foreign relations of Turkey
