= Benin–Denmark relations =

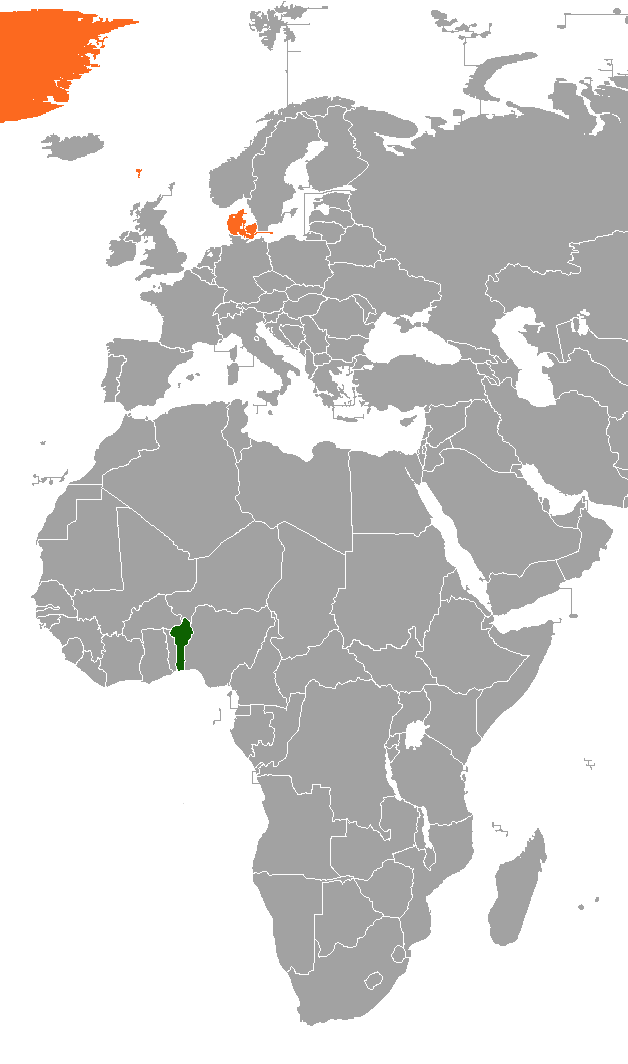
- Benin: Denmark

Benin–Denmark relations refers to the current and historical relations between Benin and Denmark. In 2007, the Danish development aid to Benin amounted 236 million DKK. Denmark is one of the largest aid donors to Benin and invested 60 million dollars in Benin in 2011. Neither country has a resident embassy.

== Development assistance ==
Poverty reduction is the main goal for Danish assistance to Benin. Danish development assistance to Benin began in 1969, and Benin has been a Danish Programme Country since 1992. From 1969 to 1992, Danish assistance focused on electricity and water projects. In 1978, Through the United Nations, Denmark and Benin desired to strengthen cooperation and cordial relations between the two countries and Denmark agreed to lend 50 million DKK to Benin as part of the economic relations between the two countries. In February 1992, Denmark granted 100 million DKK to Benin for financial assistance.

Denmark has assisted with 171 million DKK to the Beninese agriculture sector, and 198,5 million DKK to the education sector.

Danish International Development Agency (DANIDA) and the World Bank developed a mechanism sector in Benin and in 2001, DANIDA assisted Benin with the establishment of a three-year national sector.

In July 2011, Denmark contributed 300,000 DKK to Benin for the people affected by floods.

== Trade ==
All imports from Benin to Denmark are duty-free and quota-free, with the exception of armaments, as part of the Everything but Arms initiative of the European Union.

== See also ==
- Foreign relations of Benin
- Foreign relations of Denmark
