= Visa policy of Benin =

Policy on permits required to enter Benin

The visa policy of Benin is for many country's citizens to obtain an electronic visa. Most visitors to Benin must obtain an electronic visa (e-Visa) online or a visa from one of the Beninese diplomatic missions prior to their arrival in Benin, unless they are a citizen of one of the visa-exempt countries.

== Visa policy map ==
Visa policy of Benin Benin Visa not required eVisa

== Visa exemption ==
Citizens of the following countries and territories can visit Benin without a visa for the period listed below:

90 days

- All African Union member states

- Antigua and Barbuda
- Bahamas
- Belize
- Dominica
- Haiti
- United Arab Emirates

90 days within any 180 days

- Grenada

30 days

- China
- Malaysia
- Philippines

14 days

- Hong Kong
- Singapore

- Cruise ship passengers of any nationality can visit Benin without a visa for up to 72 hours.
- Visa-waiver agreements were signed with Dominica, Sri Lanka and Venezuela, however they have yet to come into force.
- In addition, holders of a passport endorsed for "public affairs" issued by China do not require a visa for up to 30 days.
- In addition to countries whose citizens are already visa-exempt, holders of diplomatic or official / service passports of Angola (30 days), Brazil (30 days), China (30 days), Macau (30 days), Cuba (30 days), France, India, Iran (30 days), Italy, Mexico, Russia, South Korea, Switzerland & Turkey do not require a visa for up to 90 days (unless otherwise stated).

Date of visa changes
- 30 April 1980: ECOWAS (Economic Community of West African States): Burkina Faso, Cape Verde, Gambia, Ghana, Guinea, Guinea-Bissau, Ivory Coast, Liberia, Mali, Niger, Nigeria, Senegal, Sierra Leone, Togo
- 28 May 1980: Algeria (diplomatic and service passports)
- 10 December 1981: Cuba (diplomatic and service passports)
- 27 May 1992: China (travelling on duty, diplomatic and service passports)
- 1 June 1992: South Korea (diplomatic passports)
- 17 February 1993: South Africa
- 3-5 June 1993: Tunisia
- 28 February 1997: Hong Kong
- 21 June 2001: Russia (diplomatic and service passports)
- 2 April 2002: Chad
- 15 June 2004: Morocco (diplomatic and service passports)
- 11 August 2005: Brazil (diplomatic and service passports)
- 23 March 2007: Republic of the Congo
- 28 November 2007: France (biometric diplomatic passports)
- 19 February 2008: Haiti
- 30 September 2009: Mexico (diplomatic passports)
- 5 April 2010: Gabon (diplomatic and service passports)
- 22 October 2010: Switzerland (biometric diplomatic passports)
- 6 August 2011: Iran (diplomatic and service passports)
- 2 August 2013: Central African Republic
- 11 December 2013: Turkey (diplomatic passports)
- 30 August 2016: All African countries
- 31 August 2016: Rwanda
- 23 September 2016: Italy (diplomatic and service passports)
- May 2017: Kenya
- 29 July 2019: India (diplomatic and service passports)
- 22 September 2020: Singapore
- 22 September 2020: Indonesia, Israel, Macau (unilateral) (Note: There was no formal visa agreement behind the visa agreement for Indonesia, Israel and Macau prior to their termination in March 2023.)
- 20 September 2023: China
- 24 January 2024: Bahamas
- 16 April 2025: Grenada

Cancelled:

- March 2023: Indonesia, Israel, Macau

== Electronic Visa (e-Visa) ==
Nationals of countries that require a visa can obtain an e-Visa. E-Visas are available for stays up to 30 days (single and multiple) and 90 days (multiple).

The eVisa costs are as follows, based on the duration of stay:

Duration of stay	Number of entry	Fee
30 days	Single	50 EUR
30 days	Multiple	75 EUR
90 days	Multiple	100 EUR

Processing time can take up to 96 hours. It is recommended that visitors apply at least 7 days before their date of entry into Benin.

== See also ==
- Visa requirements for Beninese citizens
