= Benin–Russia relations =

- Benin: Russia

Benin–Russia relations are the bilateral relations between Benin and Russia.

== Soviet-era relations ==
The Soviet Union recognised the Republic of Dahomey as an independent and sovereign state on 18 August 1960, and diplomatic relations between the two states were established on 4 June 1962. From 24 July 1962, diplomatic relations between the two countries were conducted via the Soviet Embassy in Togo, until 1 February 1966, when the first Soviet Ambassador to Benin, Alexander Nikitich Abramov, was appointed.

Relations between the two countries were initially minimal, however, Soviet interactions with the country intensified after Mathieu Kérékou came to power in a coup in October 1972, and who proclaimed in 1974 that Dahomey would follow a Marxist-Leninist course. This saw the Soviet Union becoming Kérékou's major political ally in the international stage. From 1974 to 1983, more than 60% of Benin's arms imports were from the Soviet Union.

The Soviet Navy made periodic port calls to Cotonou, where between 1953 and 1980 a total of 462 ship days were spent in the capital.

In November 1986, Kérékou went on a state visit to the Soviet Union, and met with Mikhail Gorbachev. During the visit a declaration of friendship and co-operation was signed.

== Russian Federation relations ==
On 9 January 1992 Benin recognised the Russian Federation as the successor state to the Soviet Union, after the latter's dissolution. Russia has an embassy in Cotonou, and Benin has an embassy in Moscow.
