= Benin–Haiti relations =

Benin-Haiti relations
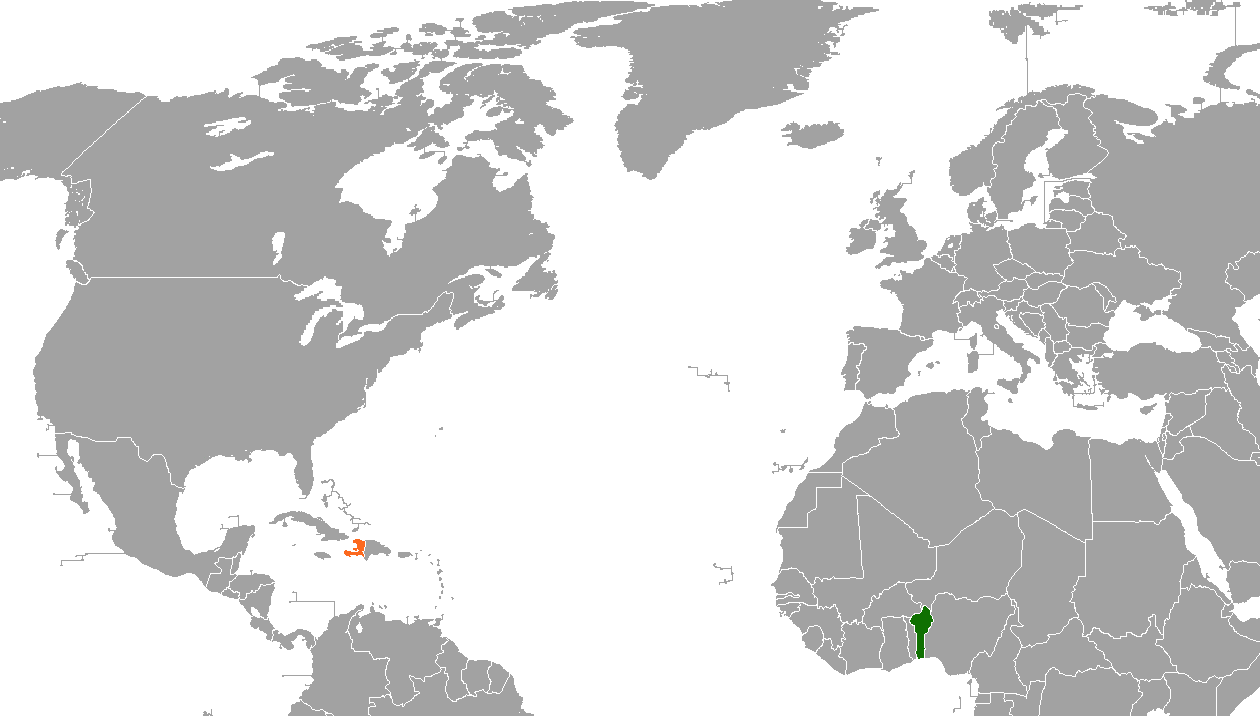

- Benin: Haiti

Envoy
- Special Envoy Pamphile Zomahoun: . .

Benin–Haiti relations refers to the current and historical relationship between Benin and Haiti.

Haiti and Benin maintain diplomatic relations since December 1960. The two countries share an extensive cultural history by way of the Atlantic slave trade and the resulting importing of Vodou as a religious force in Haitian society. The earthquake was followed, among many reactions, by an outburst of solidarity prayers in Benin with the victims. Traditional ceremonies were organized to appease the spirits and seek the blessing of ancestors for the Haitians.

== Bilateral agreements ==
During the 1st "Benin-CARICOM Foreign Ministers Meeting" in Cotonou, Haitian foreign minister Jean-Victor Harvel Jean-Baptiste met with his Beninois counterpart, Olushegun Adjadi Bakari where they signed a Memorandum of understanding on January 8, 2025, renewable after 5 years, facilitating regular political consultation on bilateral and international issues. Haiti and Benin also agreed to deepen cooperation in the fields of diplomacy, education, culture, scientific research, defense, security, among others.

== Defense and Security ==
During the 1st "Benin-CARICOM Foreign Ministers Meeting" in Cotonou, Haitian foreign minister Jean-Victor Harvel Jean-Baptiste met with his Beninois counterpart, Olushegun Adjadi Bakari, and some high-ranking officials of the Benin Armed Forces on January 9, 2025. Discussions were held over the security issues in Haiti, with the objectives of reinforcing the capacities of Haitian Armed Forces.

On January 11, 2025, at the Sofitel Hotel, a memorandum of understanding was signed by both parties, by which Haiti and Benin agreed to support one another in the fight against organized crimes and other related activities. The memorandum also included military training, Intelligence sharing, joint military exercises, and military assistance in the event of threats in or to either nations.

Benin contributed a contingency of 32 police/civilian personnel to MINUSTAH.

== Resident diplomatic missions ==
- The Special Envoy of Benin to Haiti is based at the Benin Embassy in Brasília, Brazil.
- Haiti has an embassy in Cotonou.
