= Benin–United States relations =

- Benin: United States

Diplomatic mission
- Embassy of Benin, Washington D.C.: Embassy of the United States of America, Cotonou

Envoy
- Ambassador of Benin to the United States M. Jean-Claude do Rego: Ambassador of the United States to Benin Shane Dixon

Benin and the United States have had an excellent history of relations in the years since Benin embraced democracy. The U.S. Government continues to assist Benin with the improvement of living standards that are key to the ultimate success of Benin's experiment with democratic government and economic liberalization, and are consistent with U.S. values and national interest in reducing poverty and promoting growth. The bulk of the U.S. effort in support of consolidating democracy in Benin is focused on long-term human resource development through U.S. Agency for International Development (USAID) programs.

== History ==
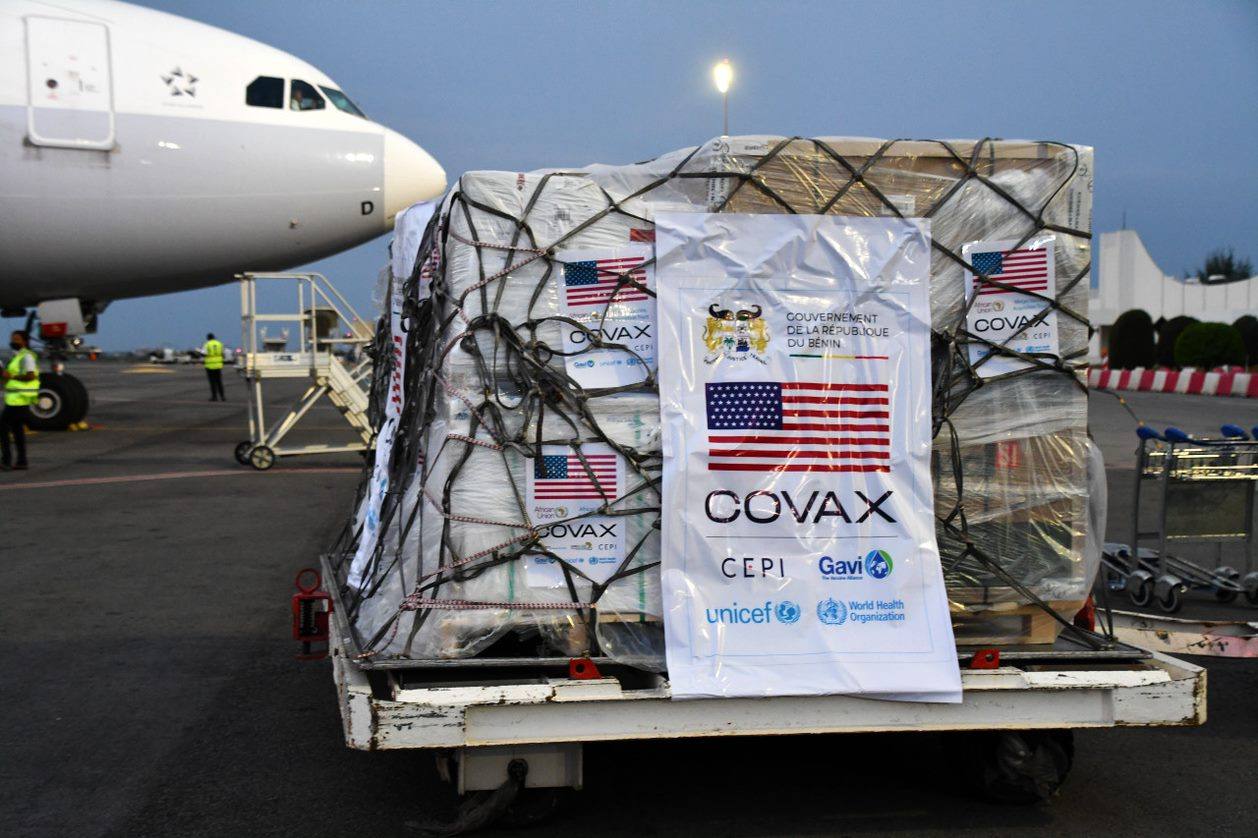
Doses of the Janssen COVID-19 vaccine arrive from the US in 2021 as part of the COVAX program

Efforts to pursue this national interest are spearheaded by USAID, which has effective programs focused on primary education, family health (including family planning), women's and children's health, and combating sexually transmitted diseases, especially the spread of HIV. USAID's Democracy and Governance program also emphasizes encouraging greater civil society involvement in national decisionmaking; strengthening mechanisms to promote transparency and accountability; improving the environment for decentralized private and local initiatives; and enhancing the electoral system and the national legislature. A panoply of military-to-military cooperation programs reinforces democratizing efforts. U.S.-Benin military cooperation is now being expanding, both bilaterally and within a broader regional framework.

In February 2006, the Government of Benin signed a 5-year $307 million Millennium Challenge Compact (MCC) to increase investment and private sector activity in Benin. The program removes key constraints to growth and supports improvements in physical and institutional infrastructures in four critical sectors: land, financial services, justice, and markets. The proposed projects reinforce each other, contributing to an economic rate of return of 17%.

The U.S. advances the ethos of law enforcement by working with Beninese authorities to crack down on crimes, help eradicate corruption, promote good governance, the rule of law, and greater official accountability.

The U.S. Public Affairs Office in Cotonou leads the U.S.-Benin cultural, professional, and educational exchanges, with a focus on helping educate the Government of Benin and the public on the trade opportunities and advantages of the African Growth and Opportunity Act. The PA Office also helps in expanding efforts to build a more responsible media.

The U.S. Peace Corps program in Benin provides ongoing opportunities for increased understanding between Beninese and Americans. The approximately 110 volunteers promote sustainable development through activities in health, education, the environment, and small enterprise development. The U.S. Peace Corps program in Benin is one of the most successful in Africa, in part because of Beninese receptivity and collaboration.

Currently, trade between Benin and the United States is small, but interest in American products is growing. The United States is interested in promoting increased trade with Benin in order to contribute to U.S. trade with Benin's neighbors, particularly Nigeria, Niger, and Burkina Faso, which receive large amounts of their own imports through the port of Cotonou. Such trade also is facilitated by Benin's membership in the Economic Community of West African States (ECOWAS) and in the CFA franc monetary zone. The U.S. Government also works to stimulate American investment in key sectors such as energy, telecommunications, and transportation. Benin has been eligible for the African Growth and Opportunity Act (AGOA) since the program began in 2000. It qualified for AGOA textile and apparel benefits in January 2004.

== Resident diplomatic missions ==
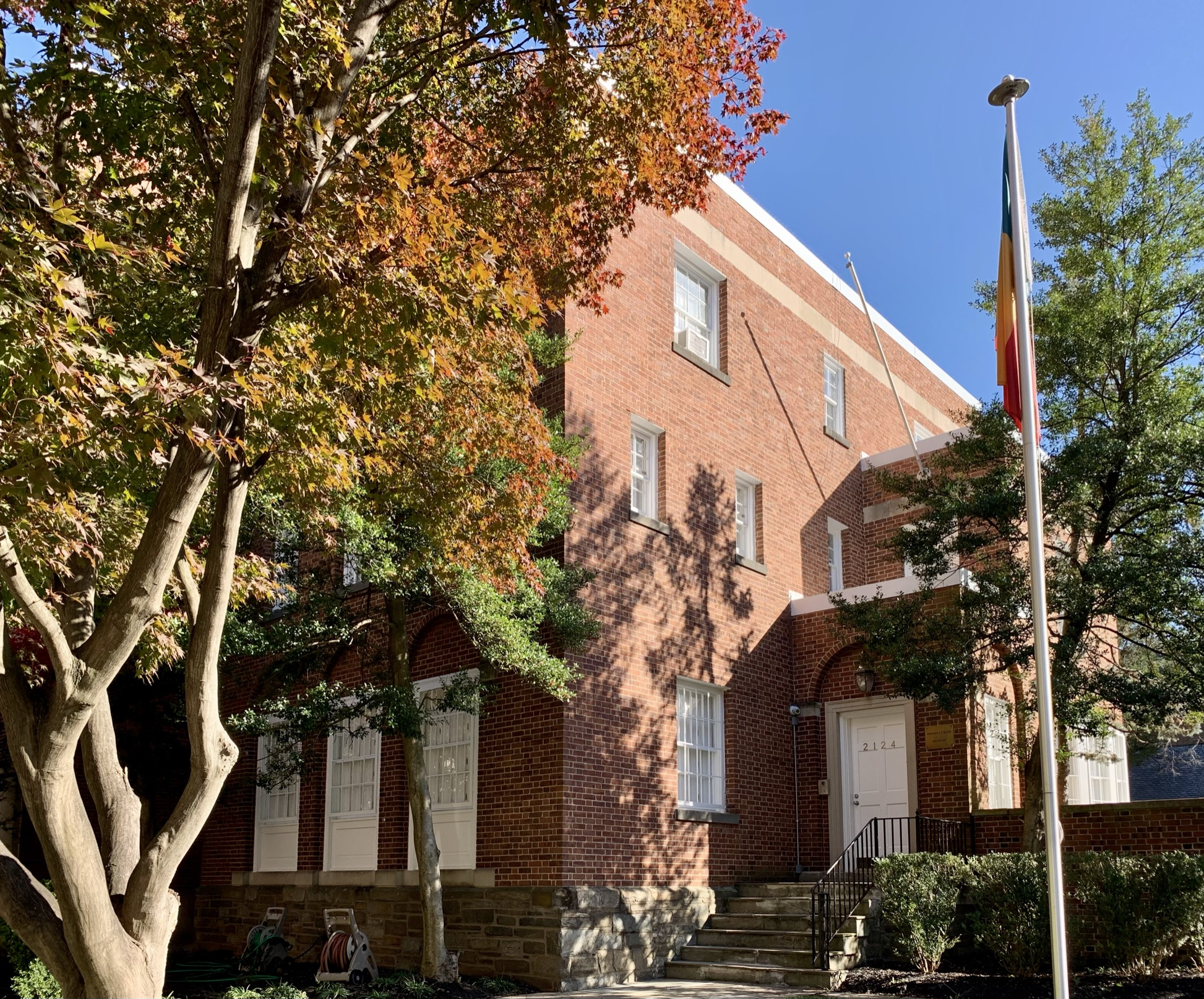
Embassy of Benin in Washington, D.C.

- Benin has an embassy in Washington, D.C.
- United States has an embassy in Cotonou.

== See also ==
- Foreign relations of Benin
- Foreign relations of the United States
