= List of diplomatic missions in Benin =

This is a list of diplomatic missions in Benin. The capital city of Cotonou hosts 30 embassies.

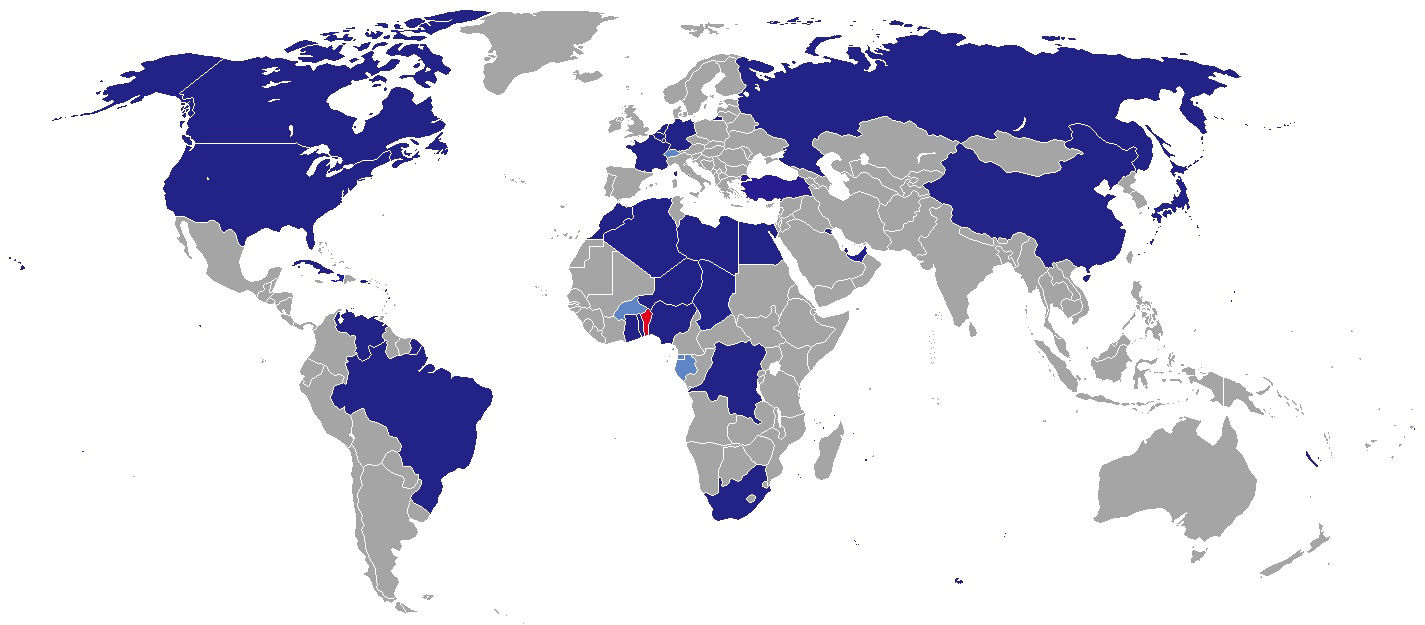
Diplomatic missions in Benin

== Diplomatic missions in Cotonou ==
=== Embassies ===
1. Algeria
2. Belgium
3. Brazil
4. Canada
5. Chad
6. China
7. Cuba
8. Congo-Kinshasa
9. Egypt
10. France
11. Germany
12. Ghana
13. Haiti
14. Holy See
15. Japan
16. Kuwait
17. Libya
18. Luxembourg
19. Morocco
20. Netherlands
21. Niger
22. Nigeria
23. Qatar
24. Russia
25. South Africa
26. Sovereign Military Order of Malta
27. Turkey
28. United Arab Emirates
29. United States
30. Venezuela

=== Other missions or delegations ===
1. European Union (Delegation)
2. Switzerland (Cooperation office & consular agency)
3. Togo (Embassy office)

== Consulates-General in Cotonou ==
1. Burkina Faso
2. Equatorial Guinea
3. Gabon

== Non-resident embassies accredited to Benin ==
=== Resident in Abuja, Nigeria ===
1. Angola
2. Argentina
3. Australia
4. Bulgaria
5. Burundi
6. Equatorial Guinea
7. Czechia
8. Denmark
9. Finland
10. Gambia
11. Greece
12. Guinea
13. Guinea-Bissau
14. Hungary
15. India
16. Indonesia
17. Ireland
18. Italy
19. Kenya
20. Liberia
21. Malaysia
22. Mexico
23. Norway
24. Palestine
25. Philippines
26. Poland
27. Portugal
28. Romania
29. Saudi Arabia
30. Serbia
31. Sierra Leone
32. Slovakia
33. Spain
34. Sudan
35. Tanzania
36. Thailand
37. Togo
38. Tunisia
39. Uganda
40. Ukraine
41. Zambia
42. Zimbabwe

=== Resident in Accra, Ghana ===
1. Austria
2. Burkina Faso
3. Colombia
4. Ivory Coast
5. Lebanon
6. Mali
7. Namibia
8. Pakistan
9. Peru
10. Rwanda
11. South Korea
12. Switzerland
13. United Kingdom

=== Resident in Rabat, Morocco ===
1. Kazakhstan
2. Oman
3. Paraguay
4. Vietnam

=== Resident elsewhere ===
1. Croatia (Paris)
2. Gabon (Lomé)
3. Iran (Niamey)
4. Israel (Abidjan)
5. Madagascar (Dakar)
6. Malawi (Addis Ababa)
7. Mauritania (Niamey)
8. Nicaragua (Ouagadougou)
9. Seychelles (Addis Ababa)
10. Sri Lanka (Nairobi)
11. Sweden (Stockholm)
