= Canada =

Country in North America

- Flag
- Motto: A mari usque ad mare (Latin) "From Sea to Sea"
- Anthem: "O Canada" Royal anthem: "God Save the King"
- Capital: Ottawa; 45°25′N 75°42′W
- Largest city: Toronto
- Official languages: English; French
- Demonym: Canadian
- Government: Federal parliamentary constitutional monarchy
  - Monarch: Charles III
  - Governor General: Louise Arbour
  - Prime Minister: Mark Carney
- Legislature: Parliament
  - Upper house: Senate
  - Lower house: House of Commons

Independence from the United Kingdom
  - Confederation: July 1, 1867
  - Balfour Declaration: November 15, 1926
  - Statute of Westminster: December 11, 1931
  - Patriation: April 17, 1982

Area
  - Total area: 9,984,670 km^{2} (3,855,100 sq mi) (2nd)
  - Water (%): 11.76 (2015)
  - Total land area: 9,093,507 km^{2} (3,511,023 sq mi)

Population
  - 2026 Q2 estimate: ▲41,798,407 (37th)
  - 2021 census: ▲36,991,981
  - Density: 4.2/km^{2} (10.9/sq mi) (230th)
- GDP (PPP): 2026 estimate
  - Total: ▲$2.916 trillion (16th)
  - Per capita: ▲$70,374 (30th)
- GDP (nominal): 2026 estimate
  - Total: ▲$2.490 trillion (11th)
  - Per capita: ▲$60,105 (23rd)
- Gini (2024): ▼29.2 low inequality
- HDI (2023): ▲0.939 very high (16th)
- Currency: Canadian dollar ($) (CAD)
- Time zone: UTC−3.5 to −7
  - Summer (DST): UTC−2.5 to −7
- Calling code: +1
- ISO 3166 code: CA
- Internet TLD: .ca

Canada (Note: English: /ˈkænədə/, French: [kanada]) is a country in North America. Its ten provinces and three territories extend from the Atlantic Ocean to the Pacific Ocean and northward into the Arctic Ocean, making it the second-largest country by total area, with the longest coastline of any country. Its border with the United States is the longest international land border. The country is characterized by a wide range of both meteorologic and geological regions. With a population of over 41 million, it has widely varying population densities, with the majority residing in its urban areas and large areas being sparsely populated. Its capital is Ottawa and its three largest metropolitan areas are Toronto, Montreal, and Vancouver.

Indigenous peoples have continuously inhabited what is now Canada for thousands of years. Beginning in the 16th century, British and French expeditions explored and later settled along the Atlantic coast. As a consequence of various armed conflicts, France ceded nearly all of its colonies in North America in 1763. In 1867, with the union of three British North American colonies through Confederation, Canada was formed as a federal dominion of four provinces. This began an accretion of provinces and territories resulting in the displacement of Indigenous populations, and a process of increasing autonomy from the United Kingdom. This increased sovereignty was highlighted by the Statute of Westminster, 1931, and culminated in the Canada Act 1982, which severed the vestiges of legal dependence on the Parliament of the United Kingdom.

Canada is a parliamentary democracy and a constitutional monarchy in the Westminster tradition. The country's head of government is the prime minister, who holds office by virtue of their ability to command the confidence of the elected House of Commons and is appointed by the governor general, representing the monarch of Canada, the ceremonial head of state. The country is a Commonwealth realm and is officially bilingual (English and French) in the federal jurisdiction. It is very highly ranked in international measurements of government transparency, quality of life, economic competitiveness, innovation, education and human rights. It is one of the world's most ethnically diverse and multicultural nations, the product of large-scale immigration. Canada's long and complex relationship with the United States has had a significant impact on its history, economy, and culture.

A developed country, Canada's advanced economy has a high nominal per capita GDP globally and ranks among the largest in the world by nominal GDP, relying chiefly upon its abundant natural resources and well-developed international trade networks. Canada is recognized as a middle power; its support for multilateralism and internationalism has been closely related to its foreign policies of peacekeeping and aid for developing countries. Canada promotes its domestically shared values through participation in multiple international organizations and forums.

== Etymology ==
While a variety of theories have been postulated for the etymological origins of Canada, the name is now accepted as coming from the St. Lawrence Iroquoian word kanata, meaning 'village' or 'settlement'. In 1535, Indigenous inhabitants of the present-day Quebec City region used the word to direct French explorer Jacques Cartier to the village of Stadacona. Cartier later used the word Canada to refer not only to that particular village but to the entire area subject to Donnacona (the chief at Stadacona); by 1545, European books and maps had begun referring to this small region along the Saint Lawrence River as Canada.

From the 16th to the early 18th century, Canada referred to the part of New France that lay along the Saint Lawrence River. Following the British conquest of New France, this area was known as the British Province of Quebec from 1763 to 1791. In 1791, the area became two British colonies called Upper Canada and Lower Canada. These two colonies were collectively referred to as the Canadas until their union as the Province of Canada in 1841.

Upon Confederation in 1867, Canada was adopted as the legal name for the new country at the London Conference and the word dominion was conferred as the country's title, reflecting its status as a self-governing nation within the British Empire. Following the London Declaration of 1949, where it was agreed that India could be a full member of the Commonwealth as a republic, not a dominion, the leaders of the Commonwealth countries agreed that the other members of the Commonwealth should not continue to be referred to as dominions. In 1951, Prime Minister Louis St. Laurent announced in the Canadian House of Commons that in light of the Statute of Westminster, 1931, and the changes to the Commonwealth, dominion was no longer an accurate term to use to refer to Canada and would no longer be used by the federal government. Similarly by 1952, the United Kingdom no longer used the term dominions to refer to Canada or other members of the Commonwealth, instead beginning to use the term a realm of the Commonwealth.

The Canada Act 1982, which brought the Constitution of Canada fully under Canadian control, referred only to Canada. Later that year, the name of the national holiday was changed from Dominion Day to Canada Day.

== History ==
=== Indigenous peoples ===
The Paleo-Indian archaeological sites at Old Crow Flats and Bluefish Caves are two of the oldest sites of human habitation in Canada. The characteristics of Indigenous societies included permanent settlements, agriculture, complex societal hierarchies, and trading networks. Indigenous peoples in present-day Canada include the First Nations, Inuit, and Métis, the last being of mixed descent who originated in the mid-17th century when First Nations people married European settlers and their descendants subsequently developed their own identity.

A map of Canada showing the percent of self-reported indigenous identity (First Nations, Inuit, Métis) by census division, according to the 2021 Canadian census

The Indigenous population at the time of the first European settlements is estimated to have been between 200,000 and 2 million, with a figure of 500,000 accepted by Canada's Royal Commission on Aboriginal Peoples. As a consequence of European colonization, the Indigenous population declined by 40 to 80 percent. The decline is attributed to several causes, including the transfer of European diseases, to which they had no natural immunity, conflicts over the fur trade, conflicts with the colonial authorities and settlers, and the loss of Indigenous lands to settlers.

Although not without conflict, European Canadians' early interactions with First Nations and Inuit populations were relatively peaceful. First Nations and Métis peoples played a critical part in the development of European colonies in Canada, particularly for their role in assisting European coureurs des bois and voyageurs in their explorations of the continent during the North American fur trade. These early European interactions with First Nations would change from friendship and peace treaties to the dispossession of Indigenous lands through treaties.

Settler colonialism reached a peak in the late 19th and early 20th centuries. The Canadian government funded Indian residential schools, administered by Christian churches, that are considered to be part of a genocide of Indigenous peoples due to the institutions' use of forced assimilation, with large scale removal of children from their birth families during the Sixties Scoop. In 2021, possible gravesites of Indigenous children were found near former Canadian residential schools, highlighting the cultural genocide against Indigenous peoples.

A racially segregated Indian hospital system was also developed, and Inuit families were forcibly relocated during the 1930s and 1950s – most notably during the High Arctic relocation in an attempt by the Canadian government to counter territorial claims by the Soviet Union and the United States in the Arctic.

A period of redress began with the formation of a reconciliation commission by the Government of Canada in 2008. This included acknowledgment of a cultural genocide, settlement agreements, and betterment of racial discrimination issues, such as addressing the plight of missing and murdered Indigenous women.

=== European colonization ===
Map of territorial claims in North America by 1750. Possessions of British America (pink), New France (blue), and New Spain (orange); California, Pacific Northwest, and Great Basin not indicated.

It is believed that the first documented European to explore the east coast of Canada was Norse explorer Leif Erikson. In approximately 1000 AD, the Norse built a small short-lived encampment that was occupied sporadically for perhaps 20 years at L'Anse aux Meadows on the northern tip of Newfoundland. No further European exploration occurred until 1497, when seafarer John Cabot explored and claimed Canada's Atlantic coast in the name of Henry VII of England. In 1534, French explorer Jacques Cartier explored the Gulf of Saint Lawrence where, on July 24, he planted a 10-metre (33 ft) cross bearing the words, "long live the King of France", and took possession of the territory New France in the name of King Francis I. The early 16th century saw European mariners with navigational techniques pioneered by the Basque and Portuguese establish seasonal whaling and fishing outposts along the Atlantic coast. In general, early settlements appear to have been short-lived due to a combination of the harsh climate, problems with navigating trade routes and competing outputs in Scandinavia.

In 1583, Sir Humphrey Gilbert, by the royal prerogative of Queen Elizabeth I, founded St John's, Newfoundland, as the first North American English seasonal camp. In 1600, the French established their first seasonal trading post at Tadoussac along the Saint Lawrence. French explorer Samuel de Champlain arrived in 1603 and established the first permanent year-round European settlements at Port Royal (in 1605) and Quebec City (in 1608). Among the colonists of New France, Canadiens extensively settled the Saint Lawrence River valley and Acadians settled the present-day Maritimes, while fur traders and Catholic missionaries explored the Great Lakes, Hudson Bay, and the Mississippi watershed to Louisiana. The Beaver Wars broke out in the mid-17th century over control of the North American fur trade.

The English established additional settlements in Newfoundland in 1610 along with settlements in the Thirteen Colonies to the south. A series of four wars erupted in colonial North America between 1689 and 1763; the later wars of the period constituted the North American theatre of the Seven Years' War. Mainland Nova Scotia came under British rule with the 1713 Treaty of Utrecht and Canada and most of New France came under British rule in 1763 after the Seven Years' War.

=== British North America ===
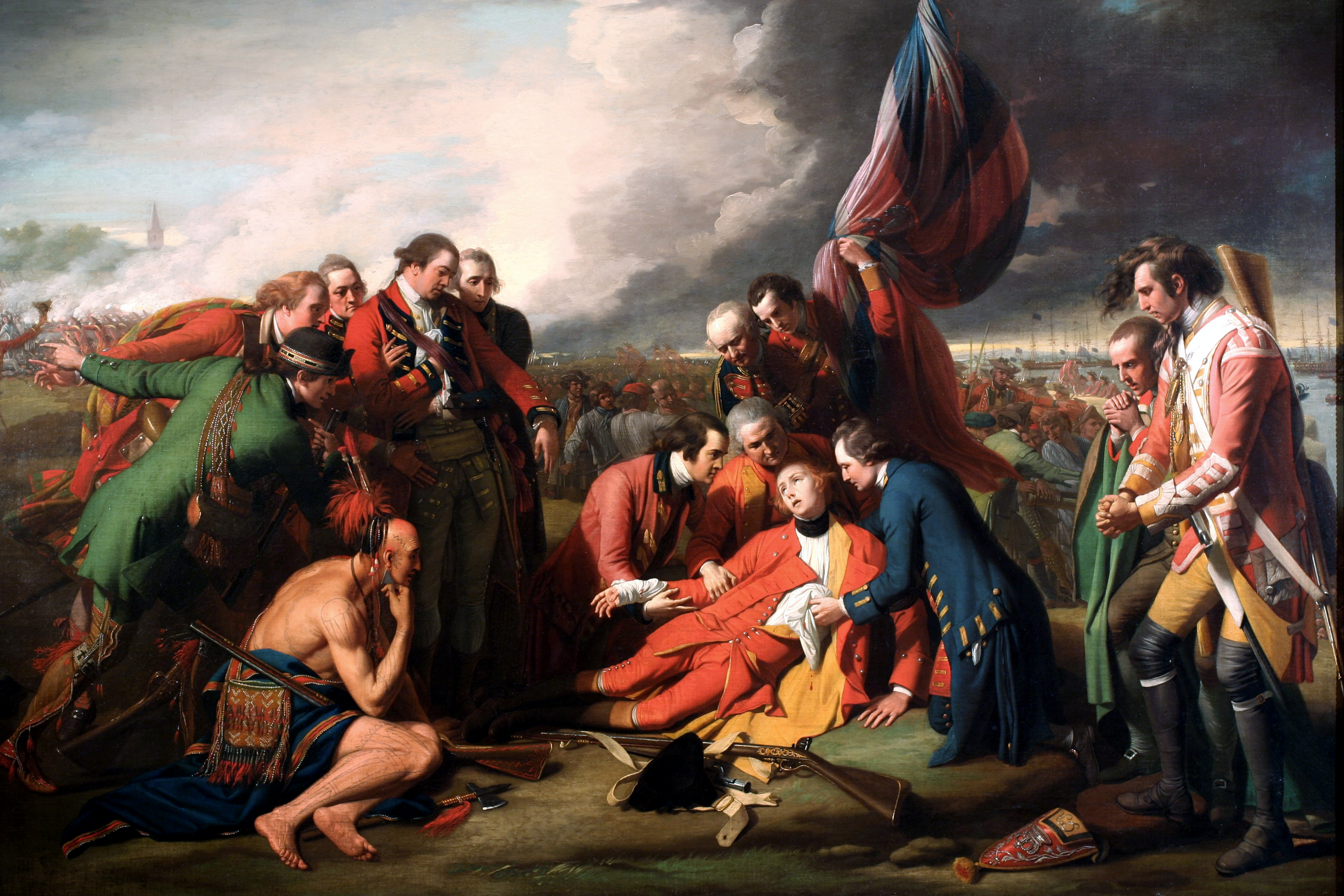
Benjamin West's The Death of General Wolfe (1771) dramatizes James Wolfe's death during the Battle of the Plains of Abraham at Quebec City.

The Royal Proclamation of 1763 established First Nation treaty rights, created the Province of Quebec out of New France, and annexed Cape Breton Island to Nova Scotia. St John's Island (now Prince Edward Island) became a separate colony in 1769. To avert conflict in Quebec, the British Parliament passed the Quebec Act 1774, expanding Quebec's territory to the Great Lakes and Ohio Valley. More importantly, the Quebec Act afforded Quebec special autonomy and rights of self-administration at a time when the Thirteen Colonies were increasingly agitating against British rule. It re-established the French language, Catholic faith, and French civil law there, staving off the growth of an independence movement in contrast to the Thirteen Colonies. The Proclamation and the Quebec Act in turn angered many residents of the Thirteen Colonies, further fuelling anti-British sentiment in the years prior to the American Revolution.

After the American War of Independence, the 1783 Treaty of Paris recognized the independence of the United States and set the terms of peace, ceding British North American territories south of the Great Lakes and east of the Mississippi River to the new country. The American war of independence also caused a large out-migration of Loyalists, the settlers who had fought against American independence. Many moved to Canada, particularly Atlantic Canada, where their arrival changed the demographic distribution of the existing territories. New Brunswick was in turn split from Nova Scotia as part of a reorganization of Loyalist settlements in the Maritimes, which led to the incorporation of Saint John, New Brunswick, as Canada's first city. To accommodate the influx of English-speaking Loyalists in Central Canada, the Constitutional Act of 1791 divided the Province of Quebec into French-speaking Lower Canada (later Quebec) and English-speaking Upper Canada (later Ontario), granting each its own elected legislative assembly.

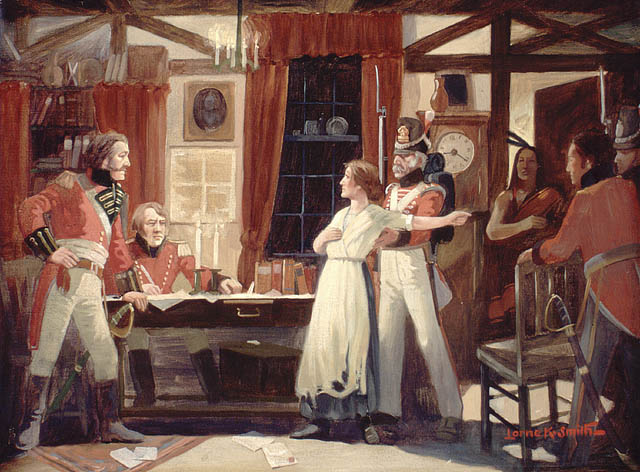
War of 1812 heroine Laura Secord warning British commander James FitzGibbon of an impending American attack at Beaver Dams

The Canadas were the main front in the War of 1812 between the United States and the United Kingdom. Peace came in 1815; no boundaries were changed. Immigration resumed at a higher level, with over 960,000 arrivals from Britain between 1815 and 1850. New arrivals included refugees escaping the Great Irish Famine as well as Gaelic-speaking Scots displaced by the Highland Clearances. Infectious diseases killed between 25 and 33 percent of Europeans who immigrated to Canada before 1891.

The desire for responsible government resulted in the abortive Rebellions of 1837. The Durham Report subsequently recommended responsible government and the assimilation of French Canadians into English culture. The Act of Union 1840 merged the Canadas into a united Province of Canada and responsible government was established for all provinces of British North America east of Lake Superior by 1855. The signing of the Oregon Treaty by Britain and the United States in 1846 ended the Oregon boundary dispute, extending the border westward along the 49th parallel. This paved the way for British colonies on Vancouver Island (1849) and in British Columbia (1858). The Anglo-Russian Treaty of Saint Petersburg (1825) established the border along the Pacific coast, but, even after the US Alaska Purchase of 1867, disputes continued about the exact demarcation of the Alaska–Yukon and Alaska–British Columbia border.

=== Confederation and expansion ===
Animated map showing the growth and change of Canada's provinces and territories since Confederation in 1867

Following three constitutional conferences, the British North America Act, 1867 officially proclaimed Canadian Confederation on July 1, 1867, initially with four provinces: Ontario, Quebec, Nova Scotia, and New Brunswick. Canada assumed control of Rupert's Land (administered by the Hudson Bay company) and the North-Western Territory to form the Northwest Territories, where the Métis' grievances ignited the Red River Rebellion and the creation of the province of Manitoba in July 1870. British Columbia and Vancouver Island (which had been united in 1866) joined the confederation in 1871 on the promise of a transcontinental railway extending to Victoria in the province within 10 years, while Prince Edward Island joined in 1873. In 1898, during the Klondike Gold Rush in the Northwest Territories, Parliament created the Yukon Territory. Alberta and Saskatchewan became provinces in 1905. Between 1871 and 1896, almost one quarter of the Canadian population emigrated south to the US.

To settle the West and attract European immigrants, Canada sponsored the construction of three transcontinental railways, enacted the Dominion Lands Act and founded the North-West Mounted Police to maintain regional authority. This period of westward expansion and nation building resulted in the displacement of many Indigenous peoples of the Canadian Prairies to "Indian reserves", clearing the way for ethnic European block settlements. This caused the collapse of the Plains Bison in western Canada and the introduction of European cattle farms and wheat fields dominating the land. The Indigenous peoples saw widespread famine and disease due to the loss of the bison and their traditional hunting lands. The federal government did provide emergency relief, on condition of the Indigenous peoples moving to the reserves. During this time, Canada introduced the Indian Act unilaterally extending its control over the First Nations to education, government and legal rights.

=== Early 20th century ===
1918 Canadian War bond posters depicting three Frenchwomen pulling a harrow

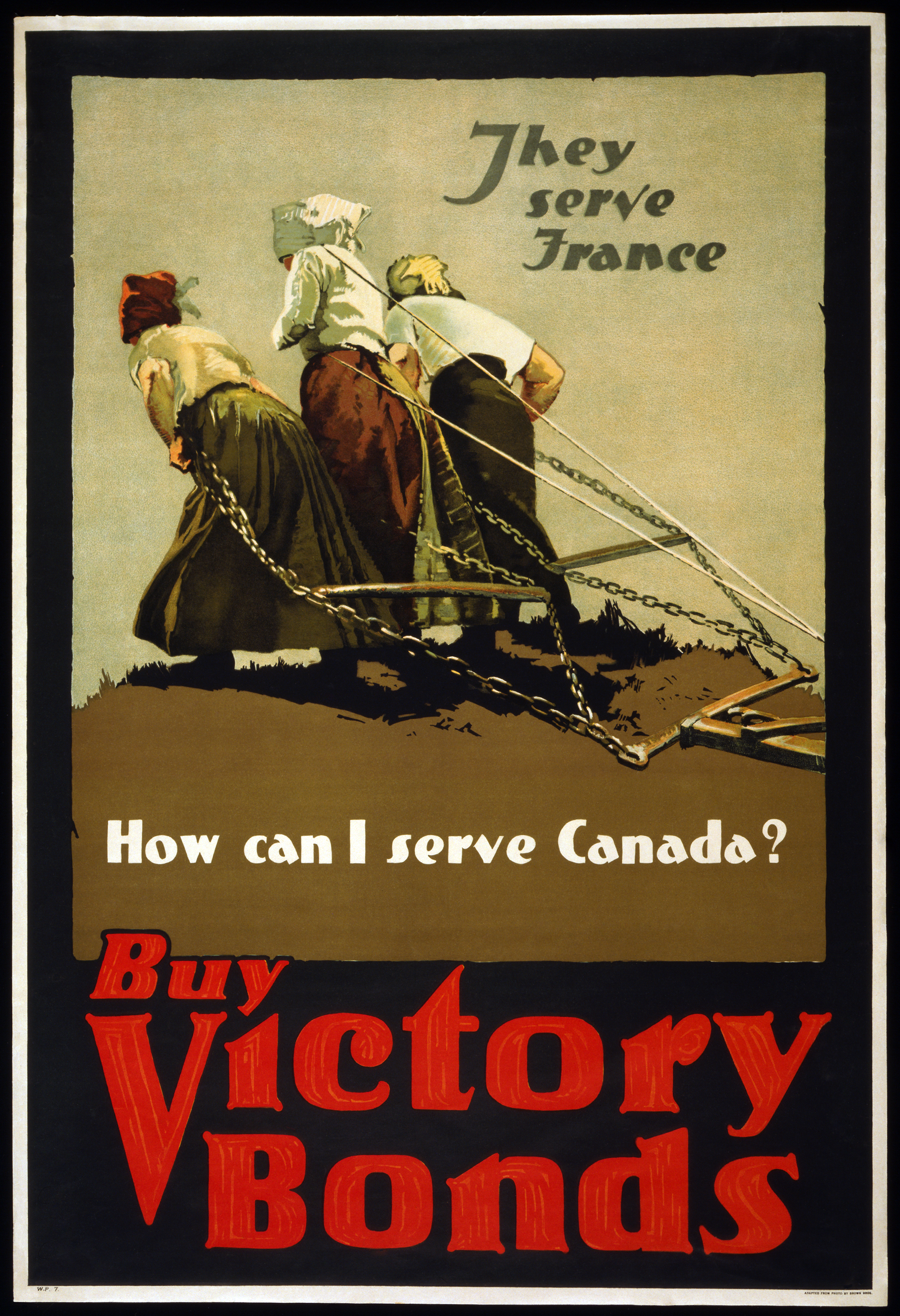
English: They serve France. How can I serve Canada? Buy Victory Bonds.

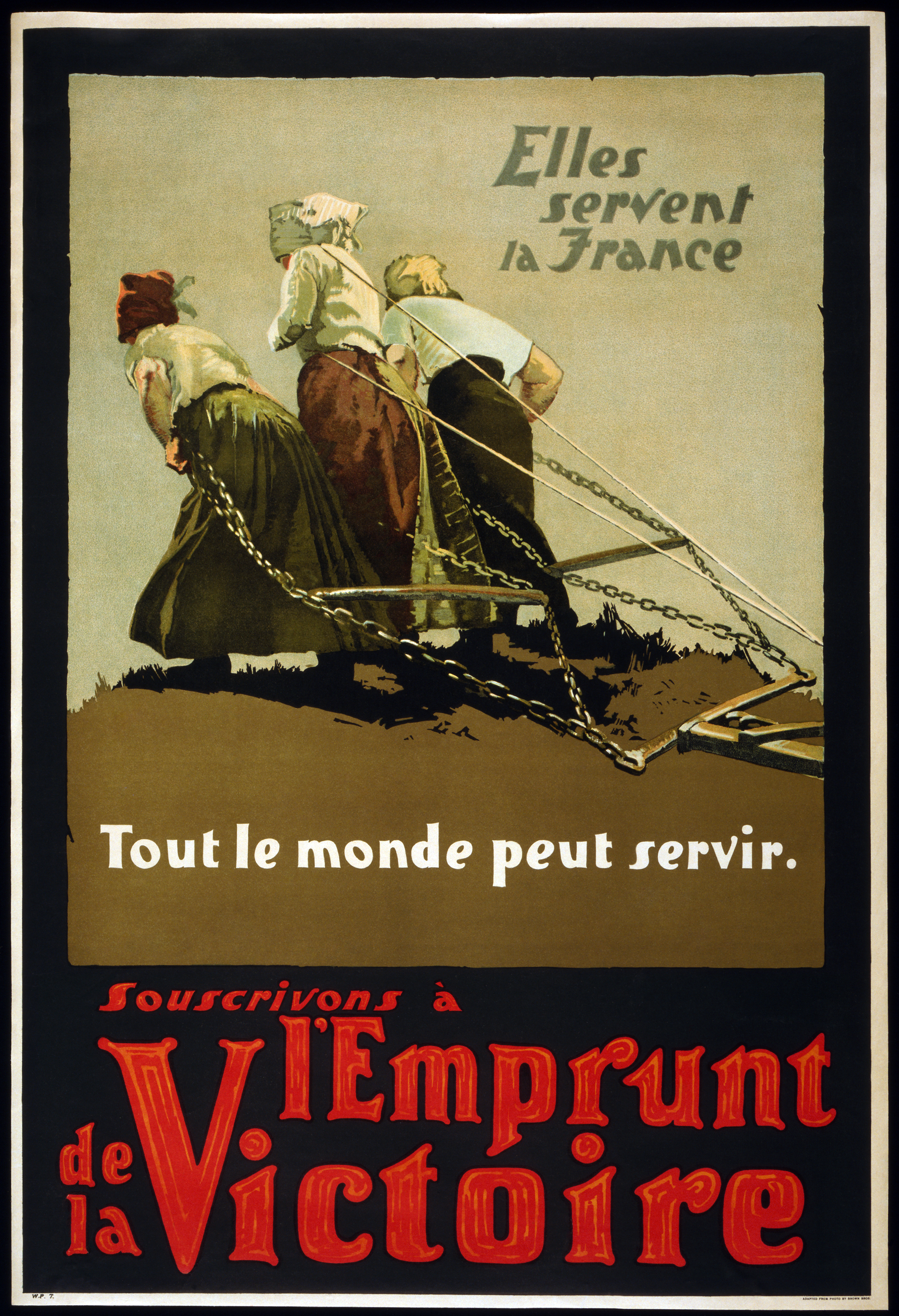
French: They serve France. Everyone can be of service. Buy Victory Bonds.

Because Britain still maintained control of Canada's foreign affairs under the British North America Act, 1867, its declaration of war in 1914 automatically brought Canada into the First World War. Volunteers sent to the Western Front later became part of the Canadian Corps, which played a substantial role in the Battle of Vimy Ridge and other major engagements of the war. The Conscription Crisis of 1917 erupted when the Unionist Cabinet's proposal to augment the military's dwindling number of active members with conscription was met with vehement objections from French-speaking Quebecers. In 1919, Canada joined the League of Nations independently of Britain. After the 1926 King–Byng affair raised concerns over the governor general's use of reserve powers, the Balfour Declaration that year put Canada on a legal path to full sovereignty equal to Britain's, and the Statute of Westminster, 1931, which implemented the declaration, affirmed Canada's independence.

The Great Depression in Canada during the early 1930s saw an economic downturn, leading to hardship across the country. In response to the downturn, the Co-operative Commonwealth Federation (CCF) in Saskatchewan introduced many elements of a welfare state (as pioneered by Tommy Douglas) in the 1940s and 1950s. On the advice of Prime Minister William Lyon Mackenzie King, war with Germany was declared effective September 10, 1939, by King George VI, seven days after the United Kingdom. The delay underscored Canada's independence.

The first Canadian Army units arrived in Britain in December 1939. In all, over a million Canadians served in the armed forces during the Second World War. Canadian troops played important roles in many key battles of the war, including the failed 1942 Dieppe Raid, the Allied invasion of Italy, the Normandy landings, the Battle of Normandy, and the Battle of the Scheldt in 1944. Canada provided asylum for the Dutch monarchy while that country was occupied and is credited by the Netherlands for major contributions to its liberation from Nazi Germany.

=== Contemporary era ===
Despite another conscription crisis in Quebec in 1944, Canada finished the war with a large army and strong economy. After two referendums, Newfoundlanders voted to join Canada in 1949 as a province. Canada's post-war economic growth, combined with the policies of successive Liberal governments, led to the emergence of a new Canadian identity, marked by the adoption of the maple leaf flag in 1965, the implementation of official bilingualism (English and French) in 1969, and the institution of official multiculturalism in 1971. Socially democratic programs were also instituted, such as Medicare, the Canada Pension Plan, and Canada Student Loans, though provincial governments, particularly Quebec and Alberta, opposed many of these as incursions into their jurisdictions.

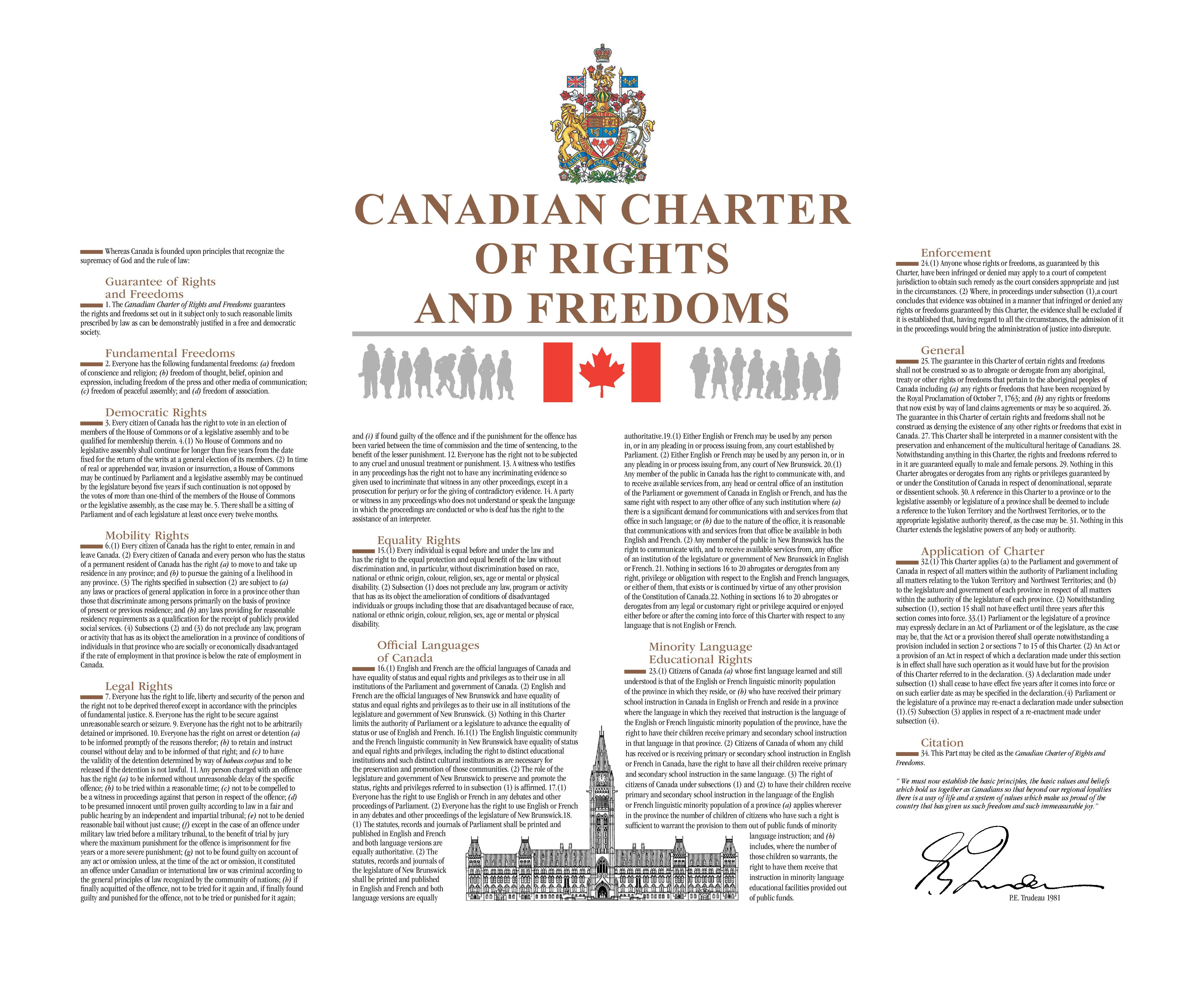
A copy of the Canadian Charter of Rights and Freedoms

Finally, another series of constitutional conferences resulted in the Canada Act 1982, the patriation of Canada's constitution from the United Kingdom, concurrent with the creation of the Canadian Charter of Rights and Freedoms. Canada had established complete sovereignty as an independent country under its own monarchy. In 1999, Nunavut became Canada's third territory after a series of negotiations with the federal government.

At the same time, Quebec underwent profound social and economic changes through the Quiet Revolution of the 1960s, giving birth to a secular nationalist movement. The radical Front de libération du Québec (FLQ) ignited the October Crisis with a series of bombings and kidnappings in 1970, and the sovereigntist Parti Québécois was elected in 1976, organizing an unsuccessful referendum on sovereignty-association in 1980. Attempts to accommodate Quebec nationalism constitutionally through the Meech Lake Accord failed in 1990. This led to the formation of the Bloc Québécois in Quebec and the invigoration of the Reform Party of Canada in the West. A second referendum followed in 1995, in which sovereignty was rejected by a slimmer margin of 50.6 to 49.4 percent. In 1997, the Supreme Court ruled unilateral secession by a province would be unconstitutional, and the Clarity Act was passed by Parliament, outlining the terms of a negotiated departure from Confederation.

In addition to the issues of Quebec sovereignty, a number of crises shook Canadian society in the late 1980s and early 1990s. These included the explosion of Air India Flight 182 in 1985, the largest mass murder in Canadian history; the École Polytechnique massacre in 1989, a university shooting targeting female students; and the Oka Crisis of 1990, the first of a number of violent confrontations between provincial governments and Indigenous groups. Canada joined the Gulf War in 1990 and was active in several peacekeeping missions in the 1990s, including operations in the Balkans during and after the Yugoslav Wars, and in Somalia, resulting in an incident that has been described as "the darkest era in the history of the Canadian military".

After the September 11 attacks in the United States, Canada sent troops to Afghanistan in 2001, resulting in the largest amount of Canadian deaths for any single military mission since the Korean War in the early 1950s. In 2011, Canadian forces participated in the NATO-led intervention into the Libyan Civil War and also became involved in battling the Islamic State insurgency in Iraq in the mid-2010s. The COVID-19 pandemic in Canada began on January 27, 2020, causing widespread social and economic disruption. A trade war involving the United States began on February 1, 2025, when U.S. president Donald Trump signed orders imposing tariffs on goods entering the United States, alongside rhetoric suggesting the annexation of Canada.

== Geography ==
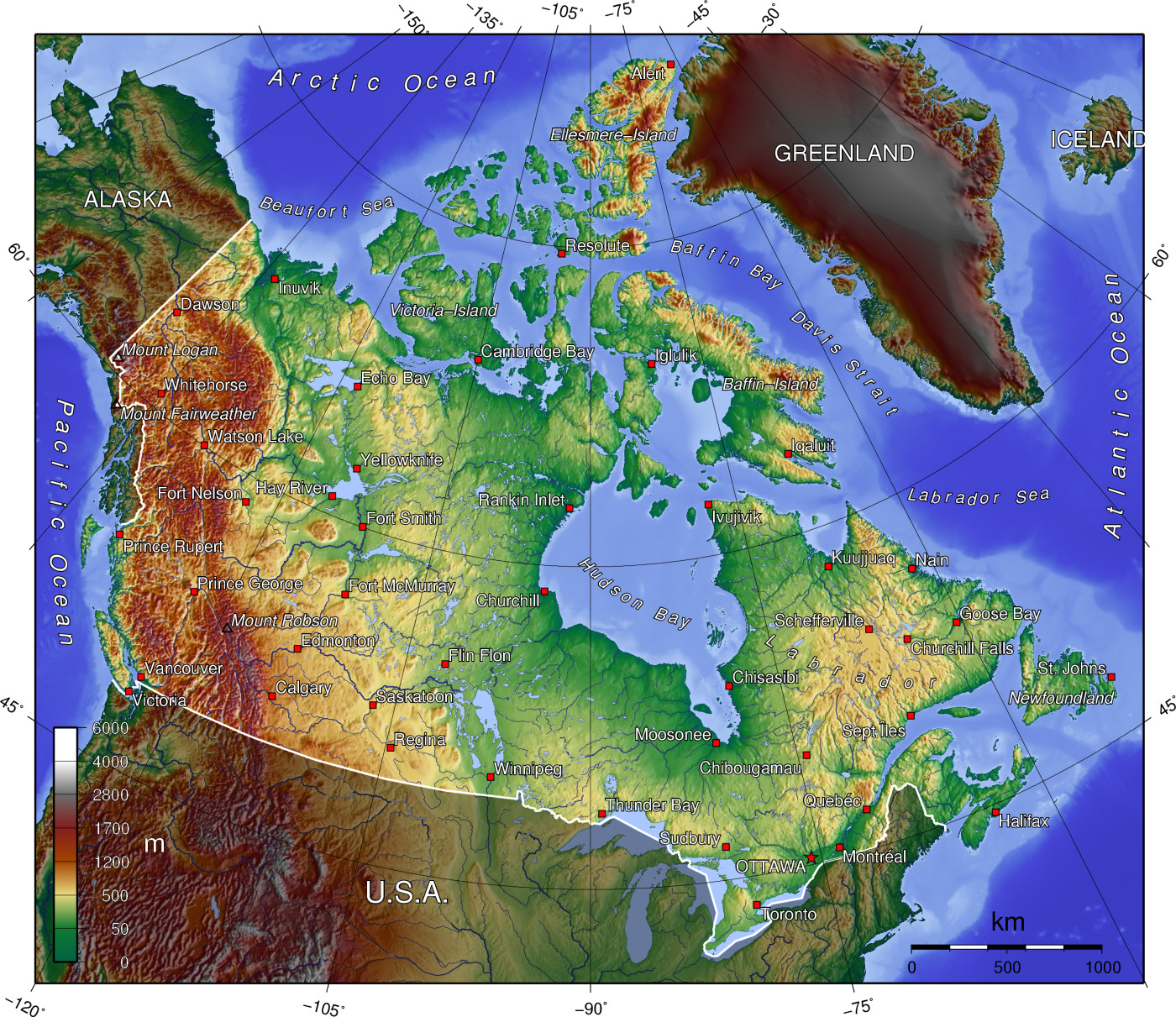
A topographic map of Canada, in polar projection (for 90° W), showing elevations shaded from green to brown (higher)

By total area (including its waters), Canada is the second-largest country. By land area alone, Canada ranks fourth, due to having the world's largest area of fresh water lakes. Stretching from the Atlantic Ocean in the east, along the Arctic Ocean to the north, and to the Pacific Ocean in the west, the country encompasses 9,984,670 square kilometres (3,855,100 sq mi) of territory. Canada also has vast maritime terrain, with the world's longest coastline of 243,042 kilometres (151,019 mi) In addition to sharing the world's largest land border with the United States—spanning 8,891 kilometres (5,525 mi) (Note: 6,416 km (3,987 mi) via the contiguous 48 states and 2,475 km (1,538 mi) via Alaska)—Canada shares a short (1,280 metres [4,200 ft]) land border with Greenland (and hence the Kingdom of Denmark) to the northeast, on Hans Island, and a maritime boundary with France's overseas collectivity of Saint Pierre and Miquelon to the southeast. Canada is also home to the world's northernmost settlement, Canadian Forces Station Alert, on the northern tip of Ellesmere Island—latitude 82.5°N—which lies 817 kilometres (508 mi) from the North Pole. In latitude, Canada's most northerly point of land is Cape Columbia in Nunavut at 83°6′41″N, with its southern extreme at Middle Island in Lake Erie at 41°40′53″N. In longitude, Canada's land extends from Cape Spear, Newfoundland, at 52°37′W, to Mount St. Elias, Yukon Territory, at 141°W.

Canada can be divided into seven physiographic regions: the Canadian Shield, the Interior Plains, the Great Lakes–St. Lawrence Lowlands, the Appalachian region, the Western Cordillera, Hudson Bay Lowlands, and the Arctic Archipelago. Boreal forests prevail throughout the country, ice is prominent in northern Arctic regions and through the Rocky Mountains, and the relatively flat Canadian Prairies in the southwest facilitate productive agriculture. The Great Lakes feed the St. Lawrence River (in the southeast) where the lowlands host much of Canada's economic output. Canada has over 2,000,000 lakes—563 of which are larger than 100 square kilometres (39 sq mi)—containing much of the world's fresh water. There are also fresh-water glaciers in the Canadian Rockies, the Coast Mountains, and the Arctic Cordillera. Canada is geologically active, having many earthquakes and potentially active volcanoes.

=== Climate ===
Köppen climate classification types of Canada

Average winter and summer high temperatures across Canada vary from region to region. Winters can be harsh in many parts of the country, particularly in the interior and Prairie provinces, which experience a continental climate, where daily average temperatures are near −15 °C (5 °F), but can drop below −40 °C (−40 °F) with severe wind chills. In non-coastal regions, snow can cover the ground for almost six months of the year, while in parts of the north snow can persist year-round. Coastal British Columbia has a temperate climate, with a mild and rainy winter. On the east and west coasts, average high temperatures are generally in the low 20s °C (70s °F), while between the coasts, the average summer high temperature ranges from 25 to 30 °C (77 to 86 °F), with temperatures in some interior locations occasionally exceeding 40 °C (104 °F).

Much of Northern Canada is covered by ice and permafrost. The future of the permafrost is uncertain because the Arctic has been warming at three times the global average as a result of climate change in Canada. Canada's annual average temperature over land has risen by 1.7 °C (3.1 °F), with changes ranging from 1.1 to 2.3 °C (2.0 to 4.1 °F) in various regions, since 1948. The rate of warming has been higher across the North and in the Prairies. In the southern regions of Canada, air pollution from both Canada and the United States—caused by metal smelting, burning coal to power utilities, and vehicle emissions—has resulted in acid rain, which has severely impacted waterways, forest growth, and agricultural productivity. Canada is one of the largest greenhouse gas emitters globally, with emissions increased by 16.5 percent between 1990 and 2022.

=== Biodiversity ===
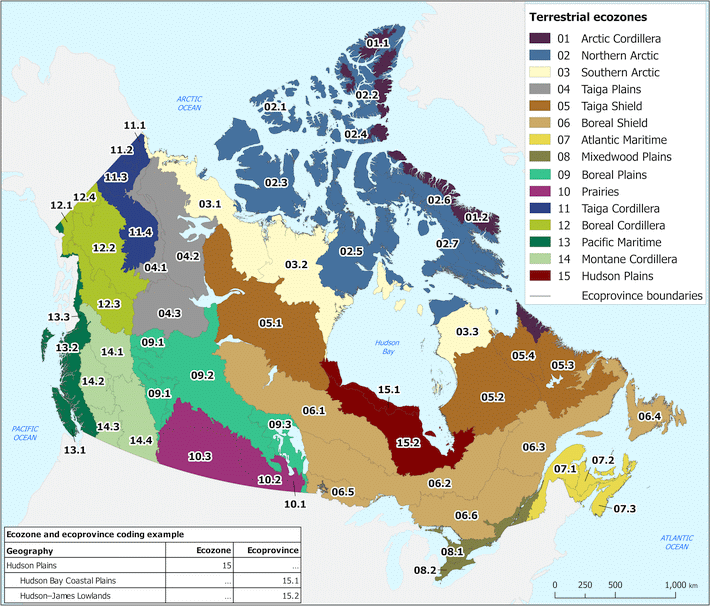
Terrestrial ecozones and ecoprovinces of Canada. Ecozones are identified with a unique colour. Ecoprovinces are subdivisions of ecozones and are identified with a unique numeric code.

Canada is divided into 15 terrestrial and five marine ecozones. These ecozones encompass over 80,000 classified species of Canadian wildlife, with an equal number yet to be formally recognized or discovered. Although Canada has a low percentage of endemic species compared to other countries, due to human activities, invasive species, and environmental issues in the country, there are currently more than 800 species at risk of being lost. About 65 percent of Canada's resident species are considered "Secure". Over half of Canada's landscape is intact and relatively free of human development. The boreal forest of Canada is considered to be the largest intact forest on Earth, with approximately 3,000,000 square kilometres (1,200,000 sq mi) undisturbed by roads, cities or industry. Since the end of the last glacial period, Canada has consisted of eight distinct forest regions.

Approximately 12.1 percent of the nation's landmass and freshwater are conservation areas, including 11.4 percent designated as protected areas. Approximately 13.8 percent of its territorial waters are conserved, including 8.9 percent designated as protected areas. Canada's first National Park, Banff National Park was established in 1885. Canada's oldest provincial park, Algonquin Provincial Park was established in 1893. Established in 2015, Lake Superior National Marine Conservation Area is the world's largest freshwater protected area. Canada's largest national wildlife region, established in 2018, is the Scott Islands Marine National Wildlife Area.

== Government and politics ==
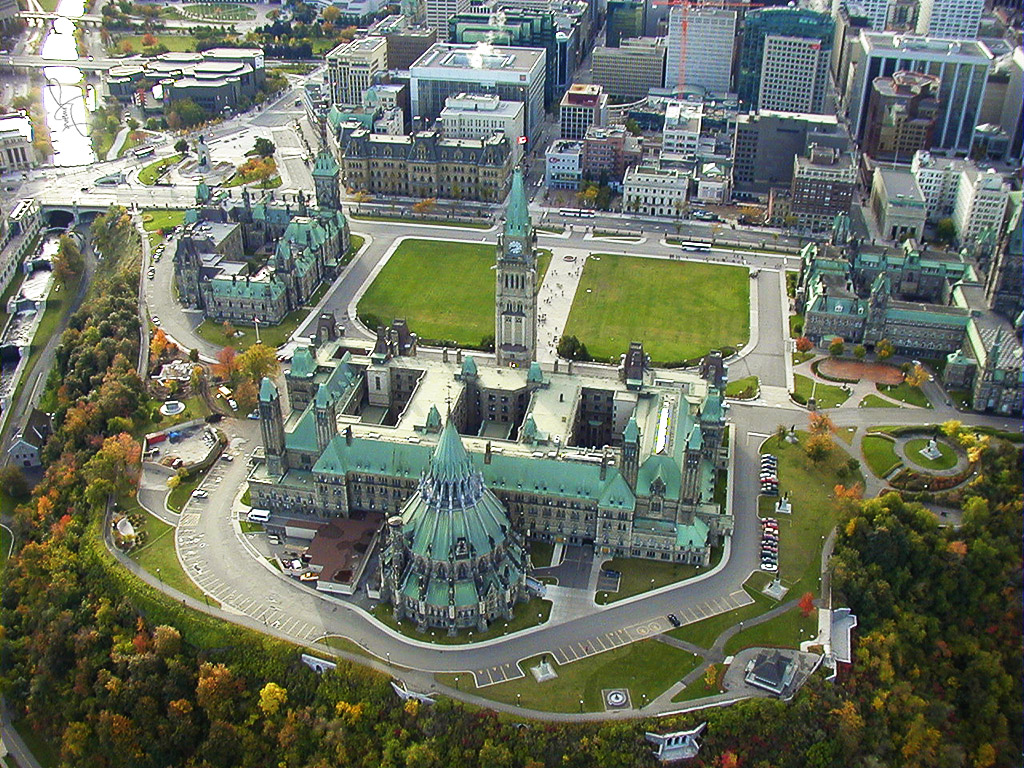
Aerial view of Canadian Parliament Buildings and their surroundings

Canada is described as a "full democracy", with a tradition of liberalism, and an egalitarian, moderate political ideology. Since the 1960s, an emphasis on social justice has been a distinguishing element of Canada's political culture. Peace, order, and good government, alongside an Implied Bill of Rights, are founding principles of Canadian federalism.

At the federal level, Canada has been dominated by two relatively centrist parties practising "brokerage politics": (Note: "Brokerage politics: A Canadian term for successful big tent parties that embody a pluralistic catch-all approach to appeal to the median Canadian voter ... adopting centrist policies and electoral coalitions to satisfy the short-term preferences of a majority of electors who are not located on the ideological fringe." "The traditional brokerage model of Canadian politics leaves little room for ideology.") the centre-left leaning Liberal Party of Canada and the centre-right leaning Conservative Party of Canada (or its predecessors). The historically predominant Liberals position themselves at the centre of the political scale. Five parties had representatives elected to Parliament in the 2025 election—the Liberals, who formed a minority government that transitioned into a majority government in April 2026 owing to defections from other parties; the Conservatives, who became the Official Opposition; the Bloc Québécois; the New Democratic Party (occupying the left); and the Green Party. Far-right and far-left politics have never been a prominent force in Canadian society, with the population generally identifying as ideologically centrist or moderate.

Canada has a parliamentary system within the context of a constitutional monarchy—the monarchy of Canada being the foundation of the executive, legislative, and judicial branches. The reigning monarch is also monarch of 14 other sovereign Commonwealth countries and Canada's 10 provinces. The monarch appoints a representative, the governor general, on the advice of the prime minister, to carry out most of their ceremonial royal duties.

Charles III
King

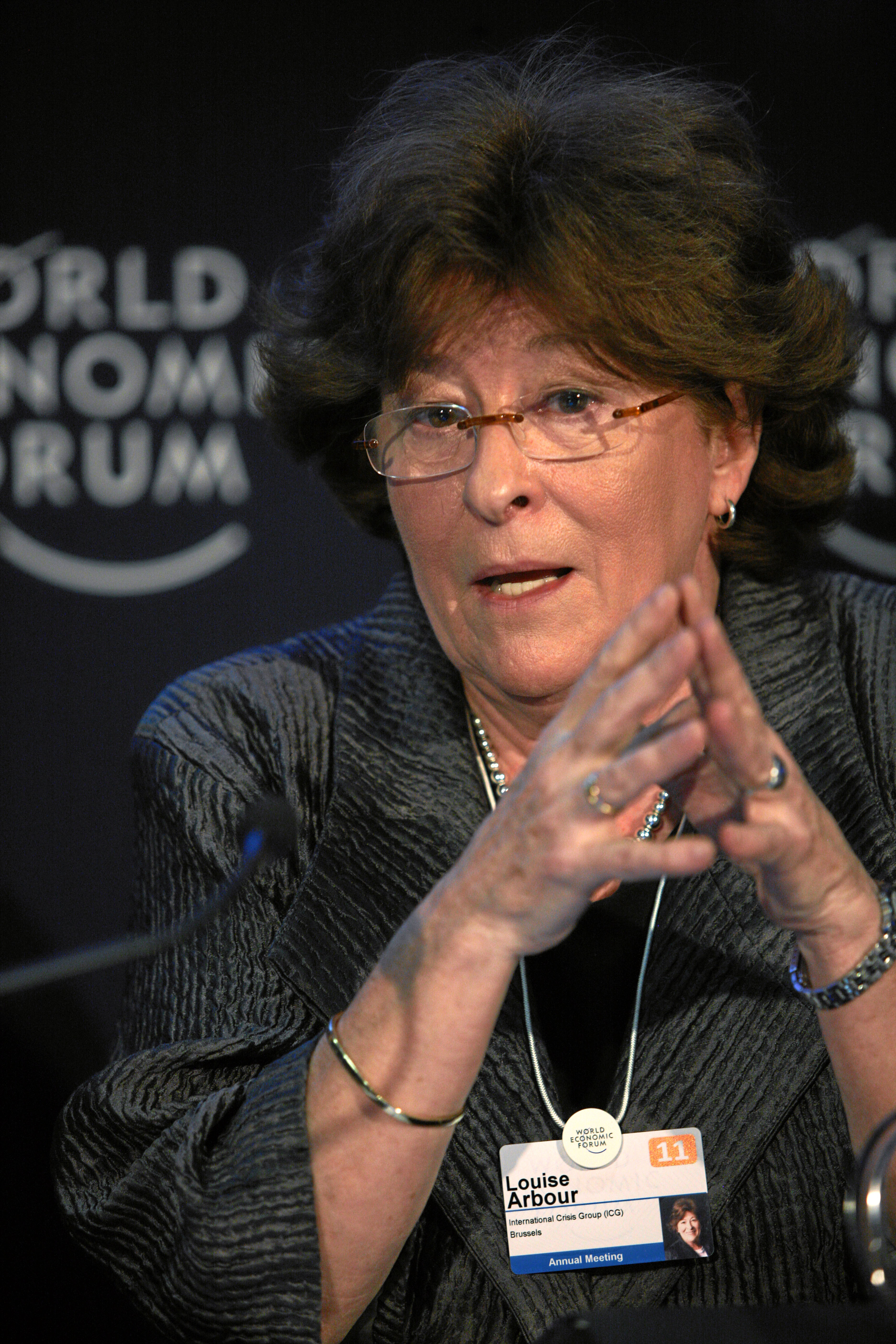
Louise Arbour
Governor General

Mark Carney
Prime Minister

The monarchy is the source of sovereignty and authority in Canada. However, while the governor general or monarch may exercise their power without ministerial advice in rare crisis situations, the use of the executive powers (or royal prerogative) is otherwise directed by the Cabinet, a committee of ministers of the Crown responsible to the elected House of Commons and chosen and headed by the prime minister, the head of government. To ensure the stability of government, the governor general will usually appoint as prime minister the person who is the current leader of the political party that can obtain the confidence of a majority of members in the House. The Prime Minister's Office (PMO) is one of the most powerful institutions in government, initiating most legislation for parliamentary approval and selecting for appointment by the Crown the governor general, lieutenant governors, senators, federal court judges, and heads of Crown corporations and government agencies. The leader of the party with the second-most seats usually becomes the leader of the Official Opposition and is part of an adversarial parliamentary system intended to keep the government in check.

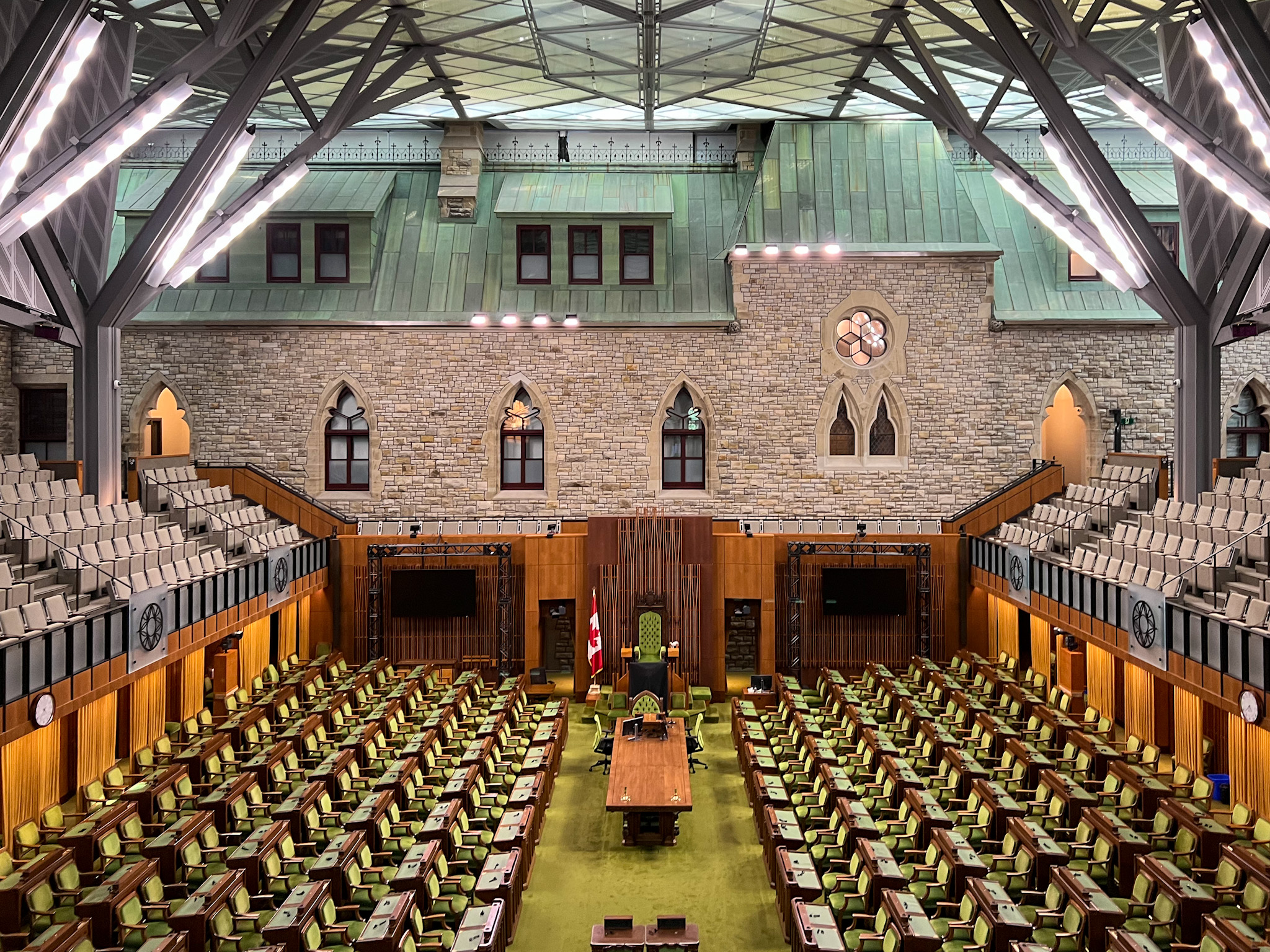
The House of Commons in its temporary location, the West Block

The Parliament of Canada passes all federal statute laws. It comprises the monarch, the House of Commons, and the Senate. While Canada inherited the British concept of parliamentary supremacy, this was later, with the enactment of the Constitution Act, 1982, all but completely superseded by the American notion of the supremacy of the law.

Each of the 343 members of Parliament in the House of Commons is elected by simple plurality in an electoral district or riding. The Constitution Act, 1982, requires that no more than five years pass between elections, although the Canada Elections Act limits this to four years with a "fixed" election date in October; general elections still must be called by the governor general and can be triggered by either the advice of the prime minister or a lost confidence vote in the House. The 105 members of the Senate, whose seats are apportioned on a regional basis, serve until age 75.

Canadian federalism divides government responsibilities between the federal government and the 10 provinces. Provincial legislatures are unicameral and operate in parliamentary fashion similar to the House of Commons. Canada's three territories also have legislatures, but these are not sovereign, have fewer constitutional responsibilities than the provinces, and differ structurally from their provincial counterparts.

=== Law ===
The Constitution of Canada is the supreme law of the country and consists of written text and unwritten conventions. The Constitution Act, 1867 (known as the British North America Act, 1867 prior to 1982), affirmed governance based on parliamentary precedent and divided powers between the federal and provincial governments. The Statute of Westminster, 1931, granted full autonomy, and the Constitution Act, 1982, ended all legislative ties to Britain, as well as adding a constitutional amending formula and the Canadian Charter of Rights and Freedoms. The Charter guarantees basic rights and freedoms that usually cannot be overridden by any government; a notwithstanding clause allows Parliament and the provincial legislatures to override certain sections of the Charter for a period of five years.

The Supreme Court of Canada in Ottawa, west of Parliament Hill

Canada's judiciary interprets laws and has the power to strike down acts of Parliament that violate the constitution. The Supreme Court of Canada is the highest court, final arbiter, and has been led since 2017 by Richard Wagner, the Chief Justice of Canada. The governor general appoints the court's nine members on the advice of the prime minister and minister of justice. The federal Cabinet also appoints justices to superior courts in the provincial and territorial jurisdictions.

Common law prevails everywhere except Quebec, where civil law predominates. Criminal law is solely a federal responsibility and is uniform throughout Canada. Law enforcement, including criminal courts, is officially a provincial responsibility, conducted by provincial and municipal police forces. In most rural and some urban areas, policing responsibilities are contracted to the federal Royal Canadian Mounted Police.

Canadian Aboriginal law provides certain constitutionally recognized rights to land and traditional practices for Indigenous groups in Canada. Various treaties and case laws were established to mediate relations between Europeans and many Indigenous peoples. The role of Aboriginal law and the rights they support were reaffirmed by section 35 of the Constitution Act, 1982. These rights may include provision of services, such as healthcare through the Indian Health Transfer Policy, and exemption from taxation.

=== Provinces and territories ===
Political map of Canada showing its 10 provinces and 3 territories

Canada is a federation composed of 10 federated states, called provinces, and three federal territories. These may be grouped into four main regions: Western Canada, Central Canada, Atlantic Canada, and Northern Canada (Eastern Canada refers to Central Canada and Atlantic Canada together). Provinces and territories have responsibility for healthcare, education, and social programs, as well as administration of justice (but not criminal law). Although the provinces collect more revenue than the federal government, equalization payments are made by the federal government to ensure reasonably uniform standards of services and taxation are kept between the richer and poorer provinces.

The major difference between a Canadian province and a territory is that provinces receive their sovereignty from the Crown and power and authority from the Constitution Act, 1867, whereas territorial governments have powers delegated to them by the Parliament of Canada and the commissioners represent the King in his federal Council, rather than the monarch directly. The powers flowing from the Constitution Act, 1867, are divided between the federal government and the provincial governments to exercise exclusively and any changes to that arrangement require a constitutional amendment, while changes to the roles and powers of the territories may be performed unilaterally by the Parliament of Canada.

=== Foreign relations ===
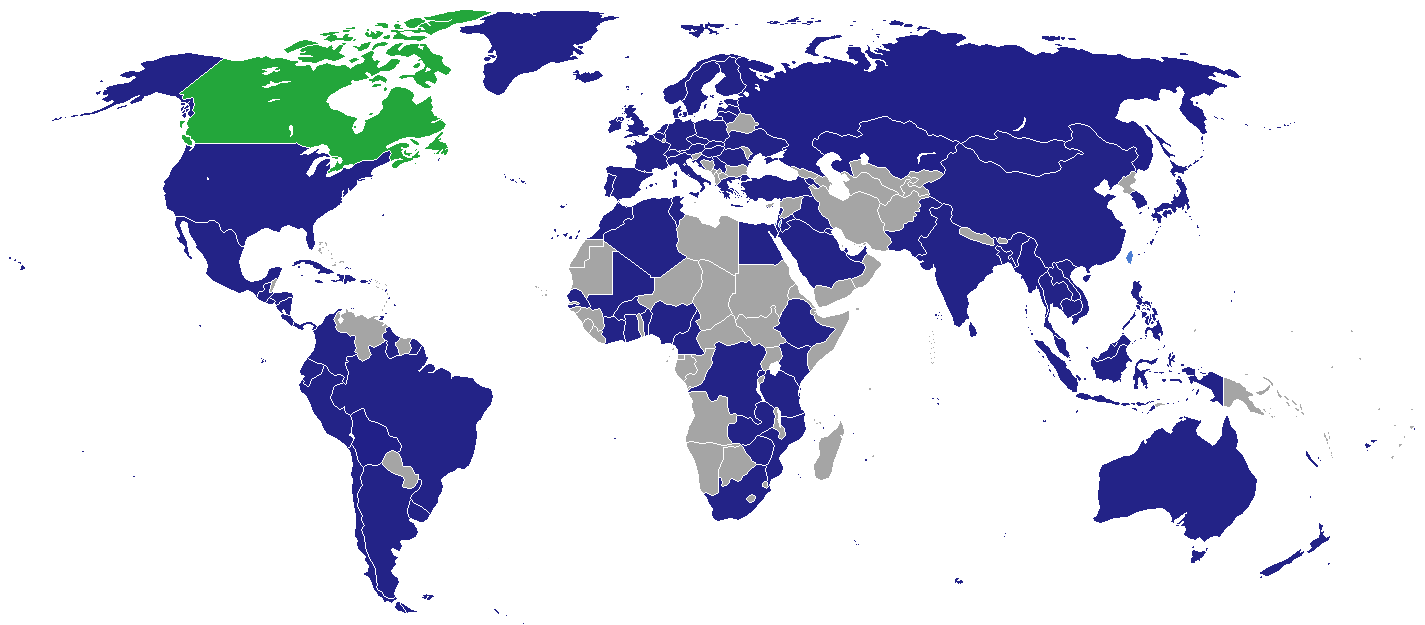
Diplomatic missions of Canada Countries that host a Canadian Embassy or High Commission Interests section and other representations Countries that do not host Canadian diplomatic missions

Canada is recognized as a middle power for its role in global affairs with a tendency to pursue multilateral and international solutions. The country actively promotes its domestically shared values of human rights, the rule of law and foreign aid through membership in multiple international organizations.

The "golden age of Canadian diplomacy" refers to a period in Canadian history, typically considered to be the mid-twentieth century, when Canada experienced a high level of success in its foreign relations and diplomatic efforts. Canada's leading role in the creation of the Universal Declaration of Human Rights and its development of modern peacekeeping during this period played a major role in the country's positive global image. The country has since fostered a favourable reputation on the world stage, widely viewed as a responsible and ethical country.

Canada and the United States have a long and complex relationship; historically close allies, they have co-operated regularly on military campaigns and humanitarian efforts. Canada also maintains traditional ties to the United Kingdom and to France, along with both countries' former colonies, through its membership in the Commonwealth of Nations and the Organisation internationale de la Francophonie. Canada is noted for having a positive relationship with the Netherlands, owing, in part, to its contribution to the Dutch liberation during the Second World War. Canada has diplomatic and consular offices in over 270 locations in approximately 180 foreign countries.

=== Military ===
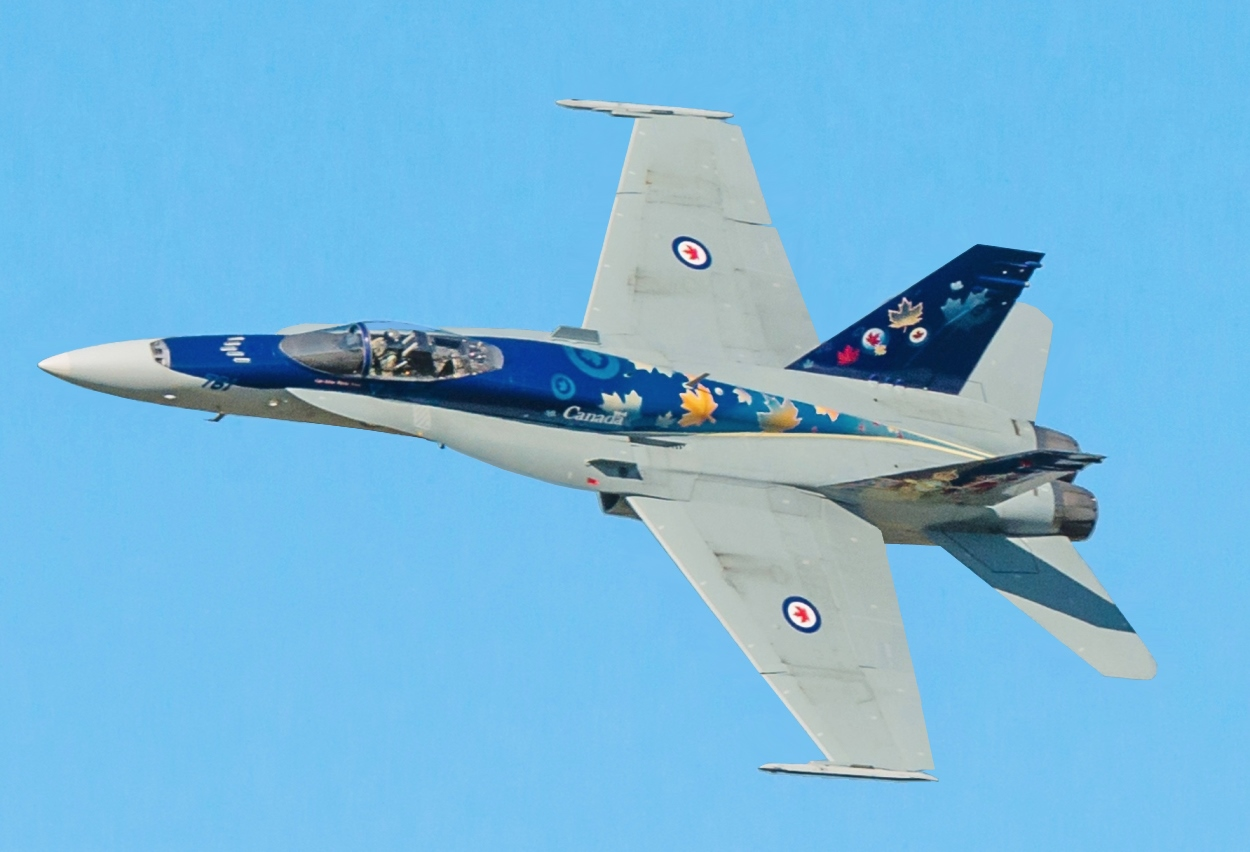
A Canadian McDonnell Douglas CF-18 Hornet in "special markings" used by the 2014 CF-18 Demonstration Team

Alongside many domestic obligations, more than 3,000 Canadian Armed Forces (CAF) personnel are deployed in multiple foreign military operations. The Canadian unified forces comprise the Royal Canadian Navy, Canadian Army, and Royal Canadian Air Force. The nation employs a professional, volunteer force of approximately 68,000 active personnel and 27,000 reserve personnel. Canada will spend 2% of its GDP on defence by the 2026 fiscal year, up from 1.3% and 1.4% in previous years.

Peacekeeping is deeply embedded in Canadian culture and a distinguishing feature that Canadians feel sets their foreign policy apart from the United States. Canada has long been reluctant to participate in military interventions that are not sanctioned by the United Nations, such as the Vietnam War, the 2003 invasion of Iraq and the 2026 Iran war. Since the 21st century, Canadian direct participation in UN peacekeeping efforts has greatly declined. The large decrease was a result of Canada directing its participation to UN-sanctioned military operations through the North Atlantic Treaty Organization, rather than directly through the UN. The change to participation via NATO has resulted in a shift towards more militarized and deadly missions rather than traditional peacekeeping duties.

== Economy ==
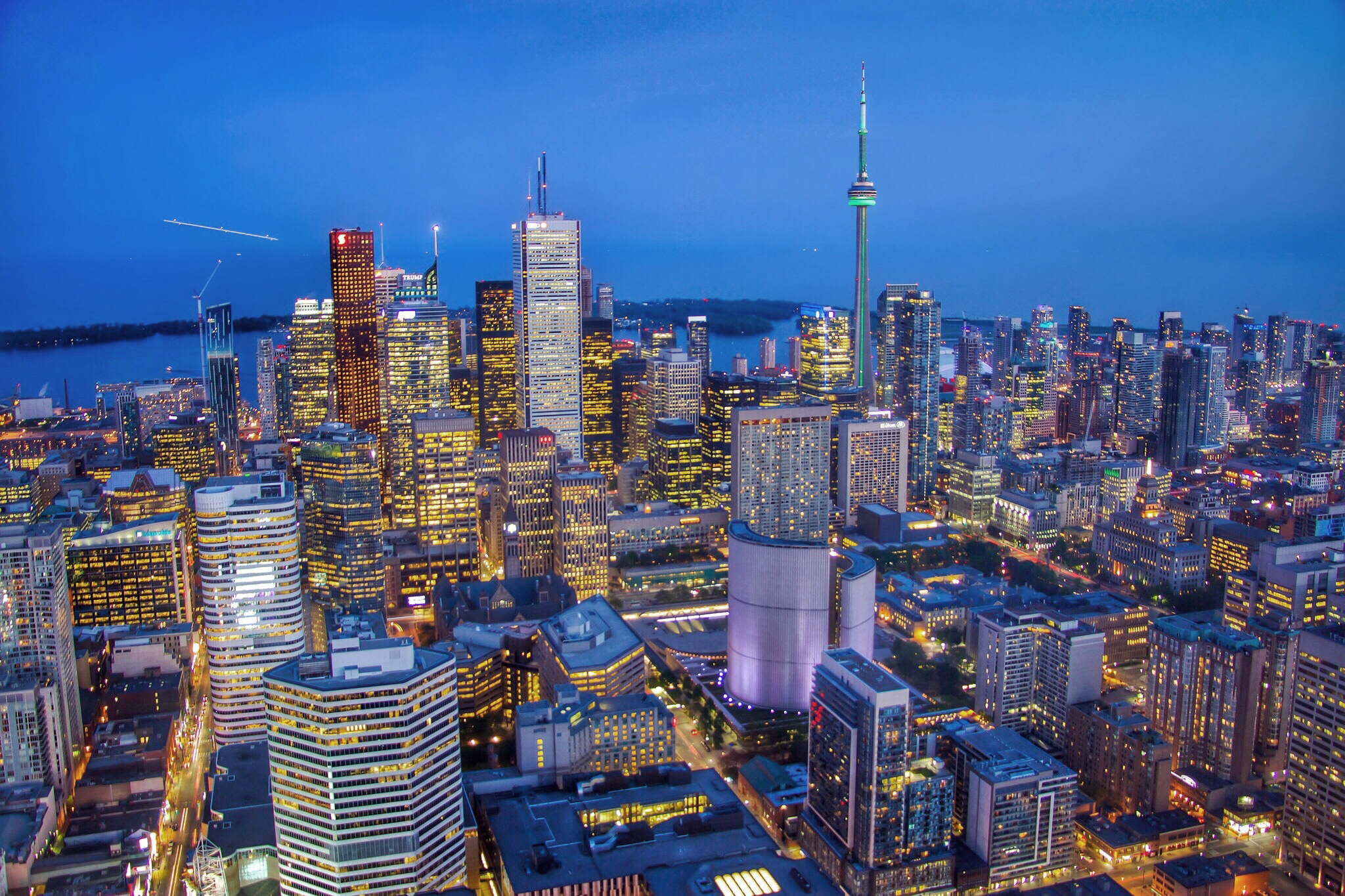
The Toronto financial district is the second-largest financial centre in North America, the seventh-largest globally in employment and the heart of Canada's finance industry.

Canada's mixed-market economy is highly developed, ranking as the world's ninth-largest by nominal GDP as of 2023, at approximately US$2.221 trillion. The country is one of the world's largest trading nations, with a highly globalized economy. In 2021, Canadian trade in goods and services reached $2.016 trillion. Canada's exports totalled over $637 billion, while its imported goods were worth over $631 billion, of which approximately $391 billion originated from the United States. The Toronto Stock Exchange is the ninth-largest stock exchange in the world by market capitalization, listing over 1,500 companies with a combined market capitalization of over US$2 trillion.

The Bank of Canada is the central bank of the country. The minister of finance and minister of innovation, science, and industry use data from Statistics Canada to enable financial planning and develop economic policy. Canada has a strong cooperative banking sector, with the world's highest per-capita membership in credit unions. Canada "is widely regarded as among the least corrupt countries of the world", with a relatively low level of income disparity. The country's average household disposable income per capita is "well above" the OECD average. In 2024, Canada had the second-largest foreign direct investment stock-to-GDP ratio among G20 countries and the lowest net debt of G7 members. Notwithstanding, Canada ranks among the lowest of the most advanced economies in several indicators, including income growth and housing affordability.

Since the early 20th century, the growth of Canada's manufacturing, mining, and service sectors has transformed the nation from a largely rural economy to an urbanized, industrial one. The Canadian economy is dominated by the service industry, which employs about three-quarters of the country's workforce. Canada has an unusually important primary sector, of which the forestry and petroleum industries are the most prominent components. Many towns in northern Canada, where agriculture is difficult, are sustained by nearby mines or sources of timber.

Canada Countries and territories with free-trade agreements

Canada's economic integration with the United States has increased significantly since the Second World War. The Canada – United States Free Trade Agreement (FTA) of 1988 eliminated tariffs between the two countries, while the North American Free Trade Agreement (NAFTA) expanded the free-trade zone to include Mexico in 1994 (later replaced by the Canada–United States–Mexico Agreement). As of 2023, Canada is a signatory to 15 free trade agreements with 51 different countries.

Canada is one of the few developed nations that are net exporters of energy. Atlantic Canada possess vast offshore deposits of natural gas, and Alberta hosts the fourth-largest oil reserves in the world. The vast Athabasca oil sands and other oil reserves give Canada 13 percent of global oil reserves, constituting the world's third- or fourth-largest. Canada is additionally one of the world's largest suppliers of agricultural products; the Canadian Prairies region is one of the most important global producers of wheat, canola, and other grains. Canada's main exports are zinc, uranium, gold, nickel, platinoids, aluminum, steel, iron ore, coking coal, lead, copper, molybdenum, cobalt, and cadmium. Canada has a sizeable manufacturing sector centred in southern Ontario and Quebec, with automobiles and aeronautics representing particularly important industries. The country's fishing and tourism industries are also a key contributor to the economy.

=== Science and technology ===
In 2020, Canada spent approximately $41.9 billion on domestic research and development, with supplementary estimates for 2022 at $43.2 billion. As of 2023, the country has produced 15 Nobel laureates in physics, chemistry, and medicine. The country ranks seventh in the worldwide share of articles published in scientific journals, according to the Nature Index, and is home to the headquarters of a number of global technology firms. Canada has one of the highest levels of Internet access in the world, and ranks among the most expensive countries globally for internet and mobile services.

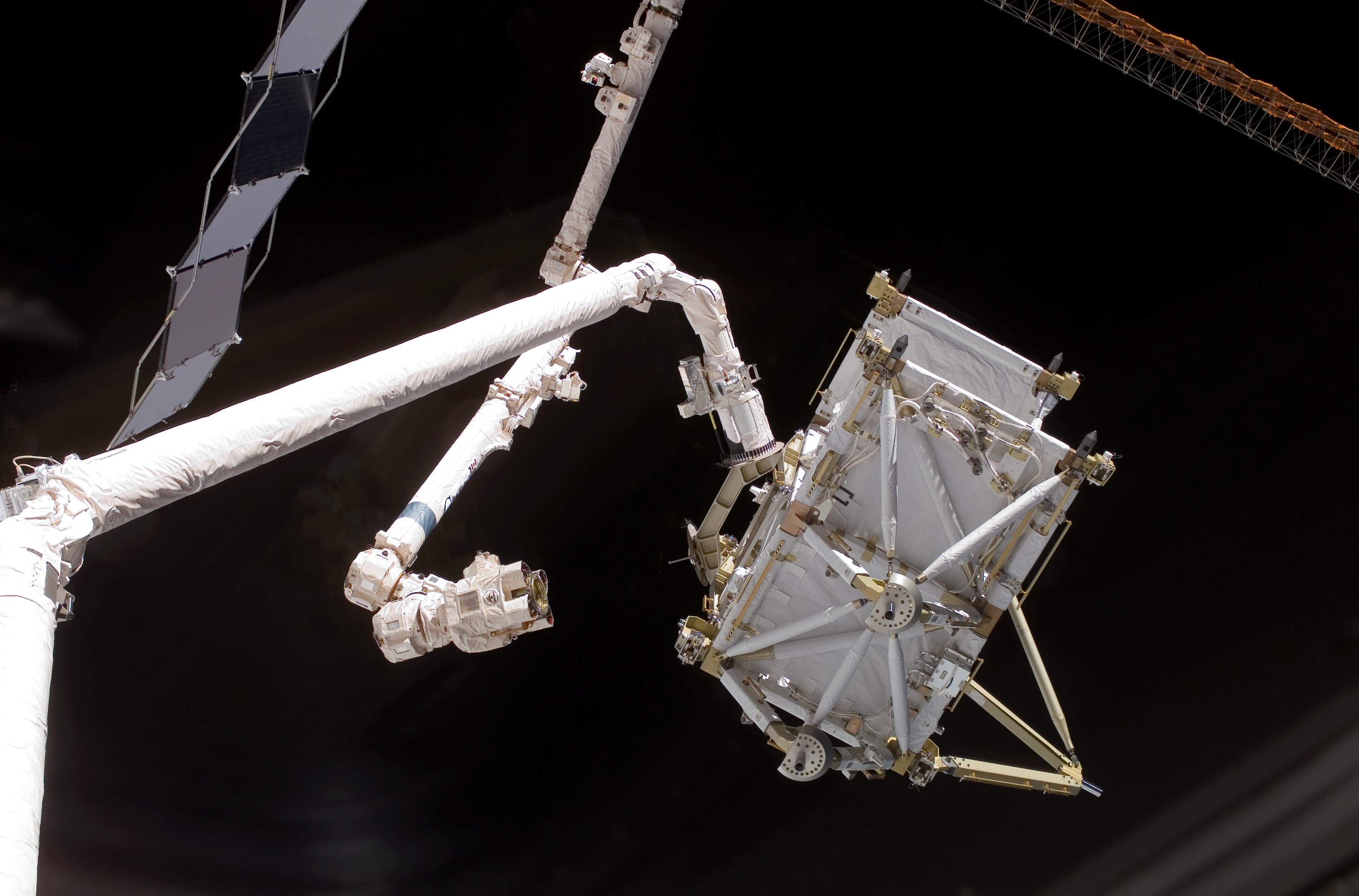
The Canadian-built Space Shuttle robotic arm (left), referred to as Canadarm, transferred the P5 truss segment over to the Canadian-built space station robotic arm, referred to as Canadarm2.

Canada's achievements in science and technology include the creation of the modern alkaline battery, the discovery of insulin, the development of the polio vaccine, and discoveries about the interior structure of the atomic nucleus. Other major Canadian scientific contributions include the artificial cardiac pacemaker, mapping the visual cortex, the development of the electron microscope, plate tectonics, deep learning, multi-touch technology, and the identification of the first black hole, Cygnus X-1. Canada has a long history of discovery in genetics, which include stem cells, site-directed mutagenesis, T-cell receptor, and the identification of the genes that cause Fanconi anemia, cystic fibrosis, and early-onset Alzheimer's disease, among numerous other diseases.

The Canadian Space Agency runs an active space program focused on deep-space, planetary, and aviation research, along with rockets and satellites. Canada launched its first satellite, Alouette 1, in 1962. It contributes to the International Space Station and is known for its robotic tools, such as multiple Canadarms. Canada has initiated many long-term projects, including the Radarsat satellite series and the Black Brant rocket series.

== Demographics ==
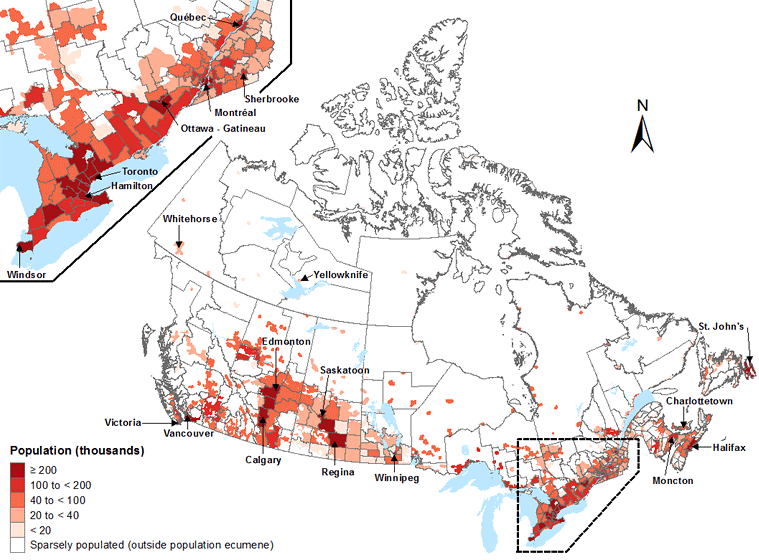
Canada population density map (2014) Top left: The Quebec City–Windsor Corridor is the most densely inhabited and heavily industrialized region.

The 2021 Canadian census enumerated a total population of 36,991,981, an increase of around 5.2 percent over the 2016 figure. It is estimated that Canada's population surpassed 40,000,000 in 2023. The main drivers of population growth are immigration and, to a lesser extent, natural growth. Canada has one of the highest per-capita immigration rates in the world, driven mainly by economic policy and family reunification. A record 483,390 immigrants were admitted in 2024. Canada leads the world in refugee resettlement; it resettled more than 47,600 in 2022. New immigrants settle mostly in major urban areas, such as Toronto, Montreal, and Vancouver.

Canada's population density, at 4.2 inhabitants per square kilometre (11/sq mi), is among the lowest in the world, with approximately 95 percent of the population residing south of the 55th parallel north. About 80 percent of the population lives within 150 kilometres (93 mi) of the border with the contiguous United States. Canada is highly urbanized, with over 80 percent of the population living in urban centres. The majority of Canadians (over 70%) live south of the 49th parallel, with 50 percent of Canadians living south of 45°42′ (45.7 degrees) north. The most densely populated part of the country is the Quebec City–Windsor Corridor in Southern Quebec and Southern Ontario along the Great Lakes and the St. Lawrence River.

The majority of Canadians (81.1%) live in family households, 12.1 percent report living alone, and 6.8 percent live with other relatives or unrelated persons. Households comprising couples with or without children make up 51 percent of all households; 8.7 percent of households are single-parent households, 2.9 percent are multigenerational households, and 29.3 percent are single-person households.

Largest metropolitan areas in Canada 2021 Canadian census
Rank	Name	Province	Pop.	Rank	Name	Province	Pop.
1	Toronto	Ontario	6,202,225	11	London	Ontario	543,551
2	Montreal	Quebec	4,291,732	12	Halifax	Nova Scotia	465,703
3	Vancouver	British Columbia	2,642,825	13	Niagara Region	Ontario	433,604
4	Ottawa–Gatineau	Ontario–Quebec	1,488,307	14	Windsor	Ontario	422,630
5	Calgary	Alberta	1,481,806	15	Oshawa	Ontario	415,311
6	Edmonton	Alberta	1,418,118	16	Victoria	British Columbia	397,237
7	Quebec City	Quebec	839,311	17	Saskatoon	Saskatchewan	317,480
8	Winnipeg	Manitoba	834,678	18	Regina	Saskatchewan	249,217
9	Hamilton	Ontario	785,184	19	Sherbrooke	Quebec	227,398
10	Waterloo Region	Ontario	575,847	20	Kelowna	British Columbia	222,162

=== Ethnicity ===
Respondents in the 2021 Canadian census self-reported over 450 "ethnic or cultural origins". The major panethnic groups chosen were: European (52.5%), North American (22.9%), Asian (19.3%), North American Indigenous (6.1%), African (3.8%), Latin, Central and South American (2.5%), Caribbean (2.1%), Oceanian (0.3%), and other (6%). Over 60 percent of Canadians reported a single origin, and 36 percent reported having multiple ethnic origins, thus the overall total is greater than 100 percent.

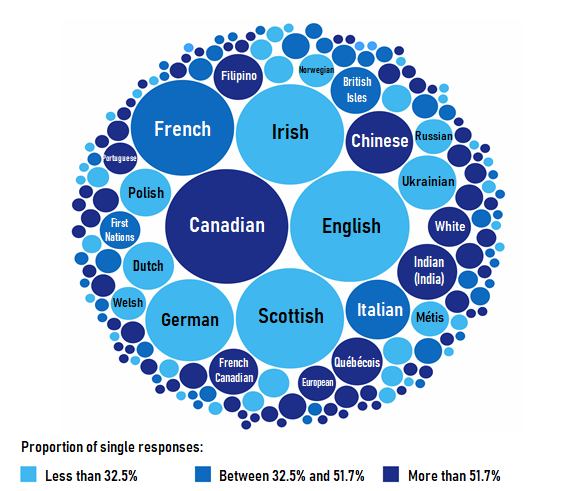
The top 168 ethnic or cultural origins self-reported by Canadians in the 2021 census

The country's ten largest self-reported ethnic or cultural origins in 2021 were Canadian (Note: All citizens of Canada are classified as "Canadians" as defined by Canada's nationality laws. "Canadian" as an ethnic group has since 1996 been added to census questionnaires for possible ancestral origin or descent. "Canadian" was included as an example on the English questionnaire and "Canadien" as an example on the French questionnaire. "The majority of respondents to this selection are from the eastern part of the country that was first settled. Respondents generally are visibly European (Anglophones and Francophones) and no longer self-identify with their ethnic ancestral origins. This response is attributed to a multitude or generational distance from ancestral lineage.") (accounting for 15.6 percent of the population), followed by English (14.7%), Irish (12.1%), Scottish (12.1%), French (11.0%), German (8.1%), Chinese (4.7%), Italian (4.3%), Indian (3.7%), and Ukrainian (3.5%).

Of the 36.3 million people enumerated in 2021, approximately 25.4 million reported being "White", representing 69.8 percent of the population. The Indigenous population representing 5 percent or 1.8 million people, grew by 9.4 percent compared to the non-Indigenous population, which grew by 5.3 percent from 2016 to 2021. One out of every four Canadians or 26.5 percent of the population belonged to a non-White and non-Indigenous visible minority, (Note: Indigenous peoples are not considered a visible minority in Statistics Canada calculations. Visible minorities are defined by Statistics Canada as "persons, other than Aboriginal peoples, who are non-Caucasian in race or non-white in colour".) the largest of which in 2021 were South Asian (2.6 million people; 7.1%), Chinese (1.7 million; 4.7%), Black (1.5 million; 4.3%), Filipinos (960,000 2.6%), Arabs (690,000; 1.9%), Latin Americans (580,000; 1.6%), Southeast Asians (390,000; 1.1%), West Asians (360,000; 1.0%), Koreans (220,000; 0.6%) and Japanese (99,000; 0.3%).

Between 2011 and 2016, the visible minority population rose by 18.4 percent. In 1961, about 300,000 people, less than two percent of Canada's population, were members of visible minority groups. The 2021 census indicated that 8.3 million people, or almost one-quarter (23.0%) of the population, reported themselves as being or having been a landed immigrant or permanent resident in Canada—above the 1921 census previous record of 22.3 percent. In 2021, India, China, and the Philippines were the top three countries of origin for immigrants moving to Canada.

=== Languages ===
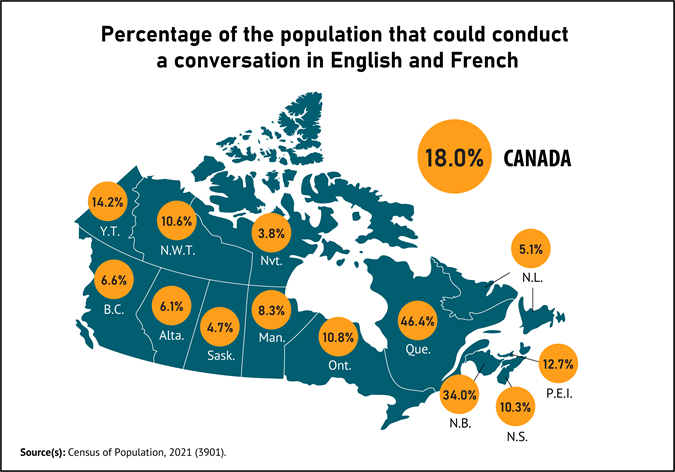
Percentage of the population who could conduct a conversation in English and French in 2021

A multitude of languages are used by Canadians, with English and French (the official languages) being the mother tongues of approximately 54 percent and 19 percent of Canadians, respectively. Canada's official bilingualism policies give citizens the right to receive federal government services in either English or French with official-language minorities guaranteed their own schools in all provinces and territories.

Quebec's 1974 Official Language Act established French as the only official language of the province. Although more than 82 percent of French-speaking Canadians live in Quebec, there are substantial Francophone populations in New Brunswick, Alberta, and Manitoba, with Ontario having the largest French-speaking population outside Quebec. New Brunswick, the only officially bilingual province, has an Acadian French minority constituting 33 percent of the population. There are also clusters of Acadians in southwestern Nova Scotia, on Cape Breton Island, and in central and western Prince Edward Island.

Other provinces have no official languages as such, but French is used as a language of instruction, in courts, and for other government services, in addition to English. Manitoba, Ontario, and Quebec allow for both English and French to be spoken in the provincial legislatures and laws are enacted in both languages. In Ontario, French has some legal status, but is not fully co-official. There are 11 Indigenous language groups, composed of more than 65 distinct languages and dialects. Several Indigenous languages have official status in the Northwest Territories. Inuktitut is the majority language in Nunavut and is one of three official languages in the territory.

As of the 2021 census, just over 7.8 million Canadians listed a non-official language as their first language. Some of the most common non-official first languages include Mandarin (679,255 first-language speakers), Punjabi (666,585), Cantonese (553,380), Spanish (538,870), Arabic (508,410), Tagalog (461,150), Italian (319,505), German (272,865), and Tamil (237,890). The country is also home to many sign languages, some of which are Indigenous. American Sign Language (ASL) is used across the country due to the prevalence of ASL in primary and secondary schools. Quebec Sign Language (LSQ) is used primarily in Quebec.

=== Religion ===
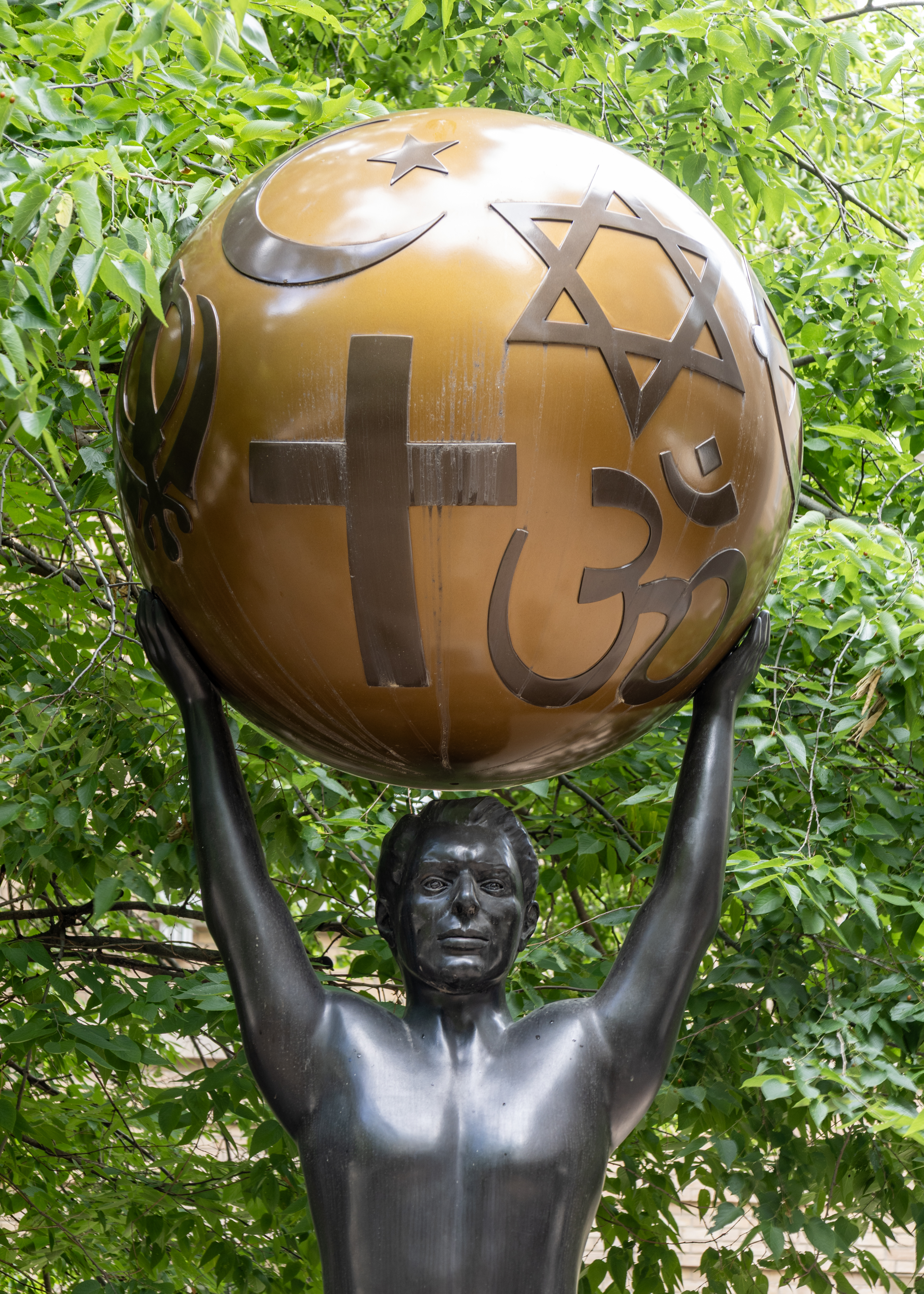
Freedom of religion sculpture by Marlene Hilton Moore at the McMurtry Gardens of Justice in Toronto

Canada is religiously diverse, encompassing a wide range of beliefs and customs. The Constitution of Canada refers to God; however, Canada has no official church and the government is officially committed to religious pluralism. Freedom of religion in Canada is a constitutionally protected right.

Rates of religious adherence have steadily decreased since the 1970s. With Christianity in decline after having once been central and integral to Canadian culture and daily life, Canada has become a post-Christian, secular state. Although the majority of Canadians consider religion to be unimportant in their daily lives, they still believe in God. The practice of religion is generally considered a private matter.

According to the 2021 census, Christianity is the largest religion in Canada, with Roman Catholics representing 29.9 percent of the population having the most adherents. Christians overall representing 53.3 percent of the population, (Note: Catholic Church (29.9%), United Church (3.3%), Anglican Church (3.1%), Eastern Orthodoxy (1.7%), Baptistism (1.2%), Pentecostalism and other Charismatic (1.1%) Anabaptist (0.4%), Jehovah's Witness (0.4%), Latter Day Saints (0.2%), Lutheran (0.9%), Methodist and Wesleyan (Holiness) (0.3%), Presbyterian (0.8%), and Reformed (0.2%). 7.6 percent simply identified as "Christians".) are followed by people reporting irreligion or having no religion at 34.6 percent. Other faiths include Islam (4.9%), Hinduism (2.3%), Sikhism (2.1%), Buddhism (1.0%), Judaism (0.9%), and Indigenous spirituality (0.2%). Canada has the second-largest national Sikh population, behind India.

=== Healthcare ===
Healthcare in Canada is delivered through the provincial and territorial systems of publicly funded health care, informally called Medicare. It is guided by the provisions of the Canada Health Act of 1984 and is universal. Universal access to publicly funded health services "is often considered by Canadians as a fundamental value that ensures national healthcare insurance for everyone wherever they live in the country". Around 30 percent of Canadians' healthcare is paid for through the private sector. This mostly pays for services not covered or partially covered by Medicare, such as prescription drugs, dentistry and optometry. Approximately 65 to 75 percent of Canadians have some form of supplementary health insurance; many receive it through their employers or access secondary social service programs.

Health expenditure and financing by country. Total health expenditure per capita in US dollars (PPP).

In common with many other developed countries, Canada is experiencing an increase in healthcare expenditures due to a demographic shift toward an older population, with more retirees and fewer people of working age. In 2021, the average age in Canada was 41.9 years. Life expectancy is 81.1 years. A 2016 report by the chief public health officer found that 88 percent of Canadians, one of the highest proportions of the population among G7 countries, indicated that they "had good or very good health". Eighty percent of Canadian adults self-report having at least one major risk factor for chronic disease: smoking, physical inactivity, unhealthy eating or excessive alcohol use. Canada has one of the highest rates of adult obesity among OECD countries, contributing to approximately 2.7 million cases of diabetes. Four chronic diseases—cancer (leading cause of death), cardiovascular diseases, respiratory diseases, and diabetes—account for 65 percent of deaths in Canada. There are approximately 8 million people aged 15 and older with one or more disabilities in Canada.

In 2024, the Canadian Institute for Health Information estimated that healthcare spending reached $372 billion, or 12.4 percent of Canada's GDP for that year. In 2022, Canada's per-capita spending on health expenditures ranked 12th among health-care systems in the OECD. The Commonwealth Fund's 2021 report comparing the healthcare systems of the 11 most developed countries ranked Canada second-to-last. Identified weaknesses were a comparatively higher infant mortality rate, the prevalence of chronic conditions, long wait times, poor availability of after-hours care, and a lack of prescription drugs and dental coverage. An increasing problem in Canada's health system is a lack of healthcare professionals and hospital capacity.

=== Education ===
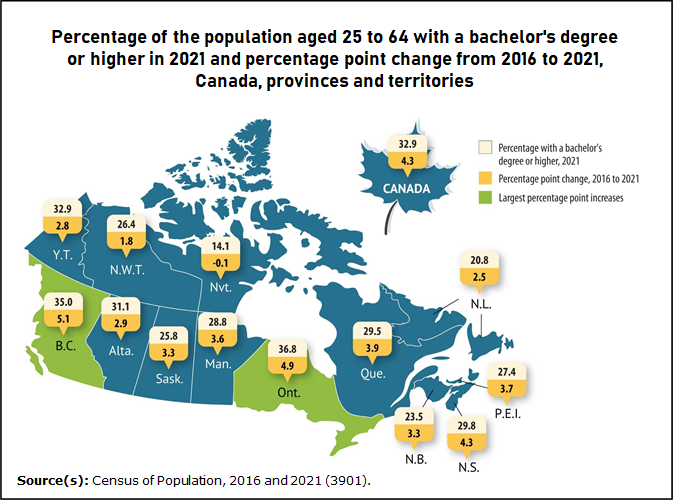
Canada by province and territory, showing the percentage of the population aged 25 to 64 who had a bachelor's degree or higher, and the percentage point change from 2016 to 2021

Education in Canada is for the most part provided publicly, funded and overseen by federal, provincial, and local governments. Education is within provincial jurisdiction and a province's curriculum is overseen by its government. Education in Canada is generally divided into primary education, followed by secondary and post-secondary education. Education in both English and French is available in most places across Canada. Canada has a large number of universities, almost all of which are publicly funded. Established in 1663, Université Laval is the oldest post-secondary institution in Canada. The nation's three top ranking universities are the University of Toronto, McGill, and the University of British Columbia. The largest university is the University of Toronto, which has over 85,000 students.

According to a 2022 report by the OECD, Canada is one of the most educated countries in the world; the country ranks first worldwide in the percentage of adults having tertiary education, with over 56 percent of Canadian adults having attained at least an undergraduate college or university degree. Canada spends an average of 5.3 percent of its GDP on education. The country invests heavily in tertiary education (more than US$20,000 per student). As of 2022, 89 percent of adults aged 25 to 64 have earned the equivalent of a high-school degree, compared to an OECD average of 75 percent.

== Culture ==
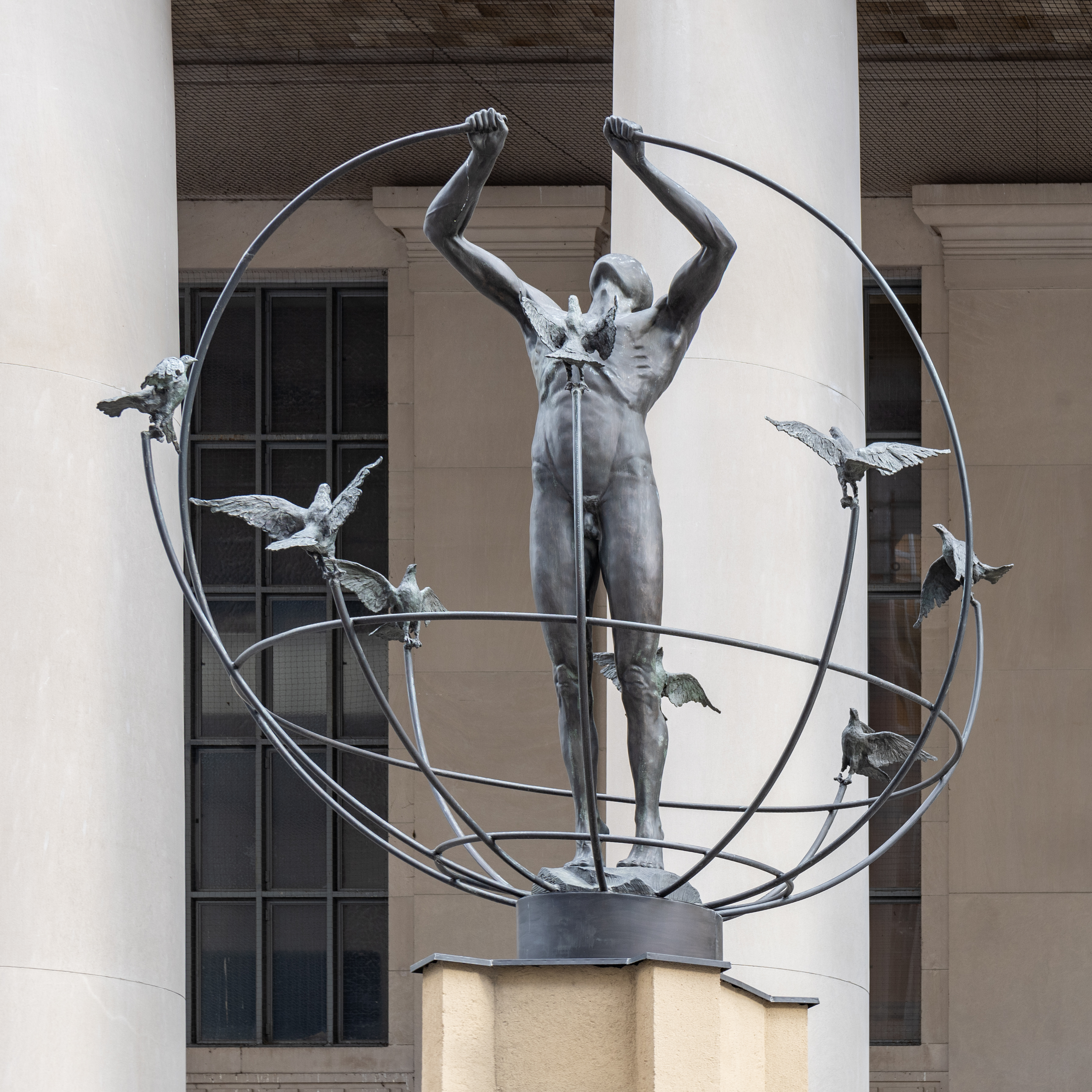
Monument to Multiculturalism by Francesco Pirelli, in Toronto

Canada is influenced by British, French and Indigenous cultures and traditions. During the 20th century, Canadians with African, Caribbean, and Asian heritages have added to Canadian identity. Canada's culture draws influences from its broad range of constituent nationalities, and policies that promote a just society are constitutionally protected. Since the 1960s, Canada has emphasized human rights and inclusiveness for all its people. Canadian identity shifted from primarily British-based to multicultural between the 1960s and 1970s.

The official state policy of multiculturalism is often cited as one of Canada's significant accomplishments and a key distinguishing element of Canadian identity. In Quebec, cultural identity is strong and there is a French Canadian culture that is distinct from English Canadian culture. As a whole, Canada is in theory a cultural mosaic of regional ethnic subcultures with diverse areas and ethnic enclaves.

Canada's approach to governance emphasizing multiculturalism, which is based on selective immigration, social integration, and suppression of far-right politics, has wide public support. Government policies such as publicly funded health care, higher taxation to redistribute wealth, the outlawing of capital punishment, strong efforts to eliminate poverty, strict gun control, a social liberal attitude toward women's rights (like pregnancy termination) and LGBT rights, and legalized euthanasia and cannabis use are indicators of Canada's political and cultural values. Canadians also identify with the country's foreign aid policies, peacekeeping roles, the national park system, and the Canadian Charter of Rights and Freedoms.

=== Symbols ===
The Canadian coat of arms from 1957 to 1994 on the former Saint-Hyacinthe post office in Quebec, now a national historic site of Canada

Themes of nature, pioneers, trappers, and traders played an important part in the early development of Canadian symbolism. Modern symbols emphasize the country's geography, northern climate, lifestyles, and the Canadianization of traditional European and Indigenous symbols. The use of the maple leaf as a symbol dates to the early 18th century in New France. The maple leaf is depicted on Canada's current and previous flags and on the arms of Canada. Canada's official tartan, known as the "maple leaf tartan", reflects the colours of the maple leaf through the seasons—green in the spring, gold in the early autumn, red at the first frost, and brown after falling. The arms of Canada are closely modelled after those of the United Kingdom, with French and distinctive Canadian elements replacing or added to those derived from the British version.

Other prominent symbols include the national motto, "A mari usque ad mare" ("from sea to sea"), the sports of ice hockey and lacrosse, the beaver, Canada goose, common loon, Canadian horse, the Royal Canadian Mounted Police, the Canadian Rockies, and, more recently, the Indigenous totem pole and Inuksuk. Canadian cuisine items such as Canadian beer, maple syrup, Nanaimo bars, butter tarts, and the Quebec dishes of poutine and tourtière, alongside material items such as tuques, canoes and Hudson's Bay point blanket are considered as uniquely Canadian. Canadian coins feature many of these symbols: the loon on the $1 coin, the coat of arms on the 50¢ piece, and the beaver on the nickel. An image of the monarch appears on $20 bank notes and the obverse of coins.

=== Literature ===
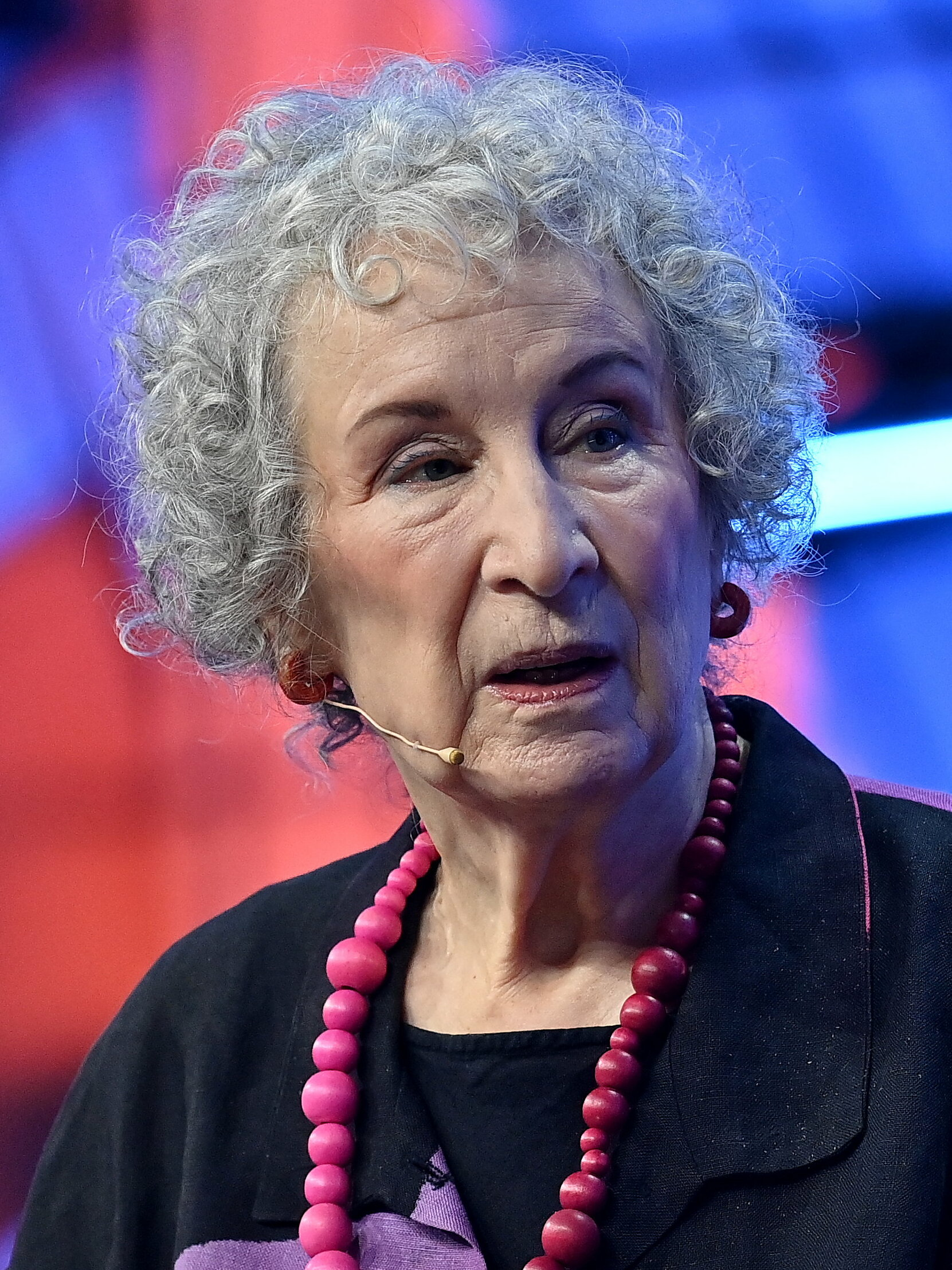
Author Margaret Atwood has suggested that during the 1970s Canadian literature was still looking for a national identity.

Canadian literature is often divided into French- and English-language literatures, which are rooted in the literary traditions of France and Britain, respectively. The earliest Canadian narratives were of travel and exploration. This developed into three major themes of historical Canadian literature: nature, frontier life, and Canada's position within the world, all of which tie into the garrison mentality. The evolution of Canadian literature is intricately linked to the country's historical and social contexts, often mirroring the challenges and changes in Canadian society. As Canadian literature progressed into the 20th and 21st centuries, it began to address a broader array of subjects and themes, such as women's rights, LGBTQ rights, immigrant experiences, environmental issues, the relationship with Indigenous peoples, and Canadian values and identity.

Financial support from governmental bodies, such as the Canada Council for the Arts and various provincial grant programs, facilitates the creation, publication, and promotion of works by Canadian authors. Numerous Canadian authors have received international literary awards including the Nobel Prize in Literature, the Booker Prize, and the Pulitzer Prize for Fiction. Canadian literary awards and prizes include the Governor General's Literary Awards, the Giller Prize, the Latner Griffin Writers' Trust Poetry Prize, the Burt Award for First Nations, Inuit and Métis Literature and several accolades for literature aimed at children.

=== Visual arts ===
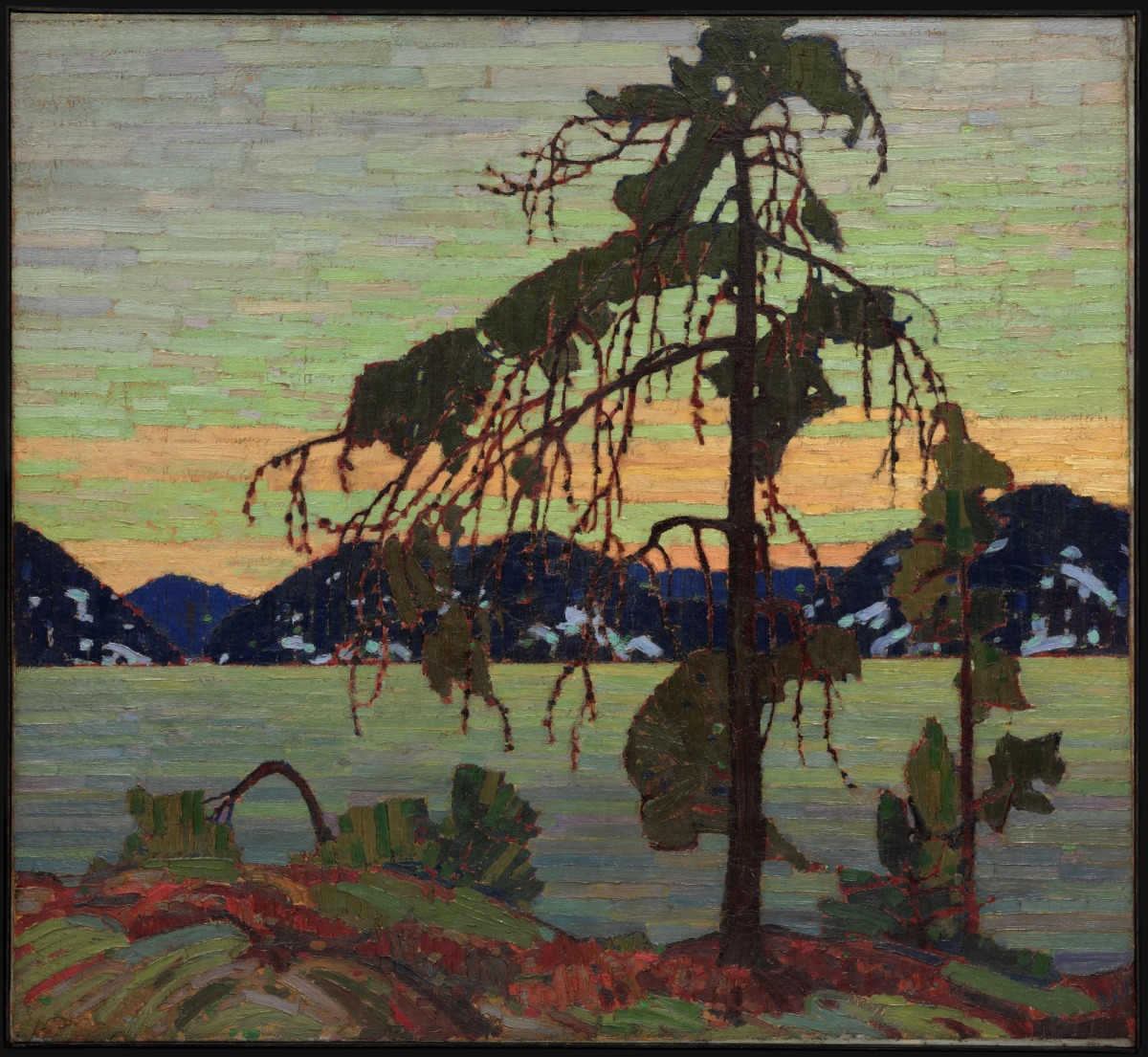
The Jack Pine by Tom Thomson. Oil on canvas, 1916, in the collection of the National Gallery of Canada.

Art in Canada is marked by thousands of years of habitation by Indigenous peoples, and, in later times, artists have combined British, French, Indigenous, and American artistic traditions, at times embracing European styles while working to promote nationalism. The nature of Canadian art reflects these diverse origins, as artists have taken their traditions and adapted these influences to reflect the reality of their lives in Canada. The Group of Seven is often considered the first uniquely Canadian artistic group and style of painting. Inuit art since the 1950s has been the traditional gift given to foreign dignitaries by the Canadian government.

Historically, the Catholic Church was the primary patron of art in early Canada, especially Quebec. The Government of Canada has played a role in the development of art, through the department of Canadian Heritage by giving grants to art galleries, as well as by establishing and funding art schools and colleges across the country, and through the Canada Council for the Arts. The Canada Council Art Bank also helps artists by buying and publicizing their work. Great achievements in art in Canada are recognized through various awards and prizes, such as the Molson Prize, the Audain Prize for the Visual Arts, and the Governor General's Visual and Media Arts Awards.

=== Music ===
Original publication of "O Canada" in English, 1908 (French, 1880)

Canadian music reflects a variety of regional scenes. Canada has developed a vast music infrastructure that includes church halls, chamber halls, conservatories, academies, performing arts centres, record companies, radio stations, music charts, and television music video channels. Government support programs, such as the Canada Music Fund, assist a wide range of musicians and entrepreneurs who create, produce and market original and diverse Canadian music. As a result of its cultural importance, as well as government initiatives and regulations, the Canadian music industry is one of the largest in the world, producing internationally renowned composers, musicians, and ensembles. Achievements in music are recognized through various awards and prizes, most notably, the Juno Awards presented by the Canadian Academy of Recording Arts and Sciences. The country also hosts numerous music halls of fame with the Canadian Music Hall of Fame honouring musicians at the national level for their lifetime achievements.

"God Save the King" has been used in Canada since the late 1700s and is the country's de facto royal anthem. Patriotic music by Canadians dates back over 200 years, with "The Bold Canadian", written in 1812, popular throughout the 19th century. "The Maple Leaf Forever", written in 1866, was popular and served as an unofficial national anthem of English Canada. "O Canada", originally composed in French in 1880, also served as an unofficial national anthem during the 20th century and was adopted as the country's official anthem in 1980.

=== Media ===
Logos used by the CBC

1940–1958

1974–1985

1986–1992

1992–present

Canada's media is highly autonomous, diverse, and very regionalized. The Broadcasting Act declares "the system should serve to safeguard, enrich, and strengthen the cultural, political, social, and economic fabric of Canada". Canada has a well-developed media sector, but its cultural output—particularly in English films, television shows, and magazines—is often overshadowed by imports from the United States. As a result, the preservation of a distinctly Canadian culture is supported by federal government programs, laws, and institutions such as the Canadian Broadcasting Corporation (CBC), the National Film Board of Canada (NFB), and the Canadian Radio-television and Telecommunications Commission (CRTC).

Canadian mass media, both print and digital, and in both official languages, is largely dominated by a "handful of corporations". The largest of these corporations is the country's national public broadcaster, the Canadian Broadcasting Corporation, which also plays a significant role in producing domestic cultural content, operating its own radio and TV networks in both English and French. In addition to the CBC, some provincial governments offer their own public educational TV broadcast services as well, such as TVOntario and Télé-Québec.

Non-news media content in Canada, including film and television, is influenced both by local creators as well as by imports from the United States, the United Kingdom, Australia, and France. In an effort to reduce the amount of foreign-made media, government interventions in television broadcasting can include both regulation of content and public financing. Canadian tax laws limit foreign competition in magazine advertising.

=== Sports ===
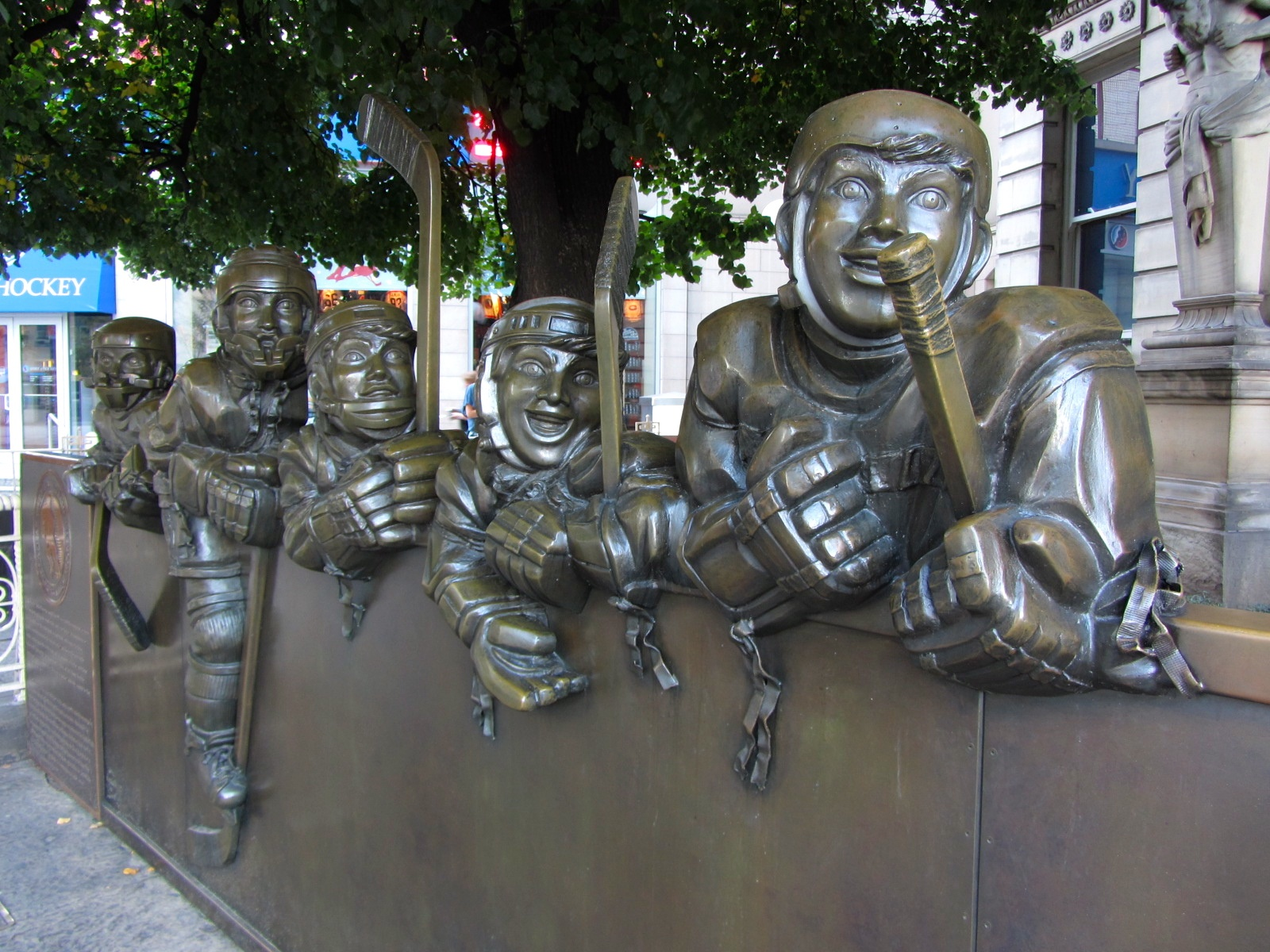
Our Game sculpture by Edie Parker outside the Hockey Hall of Fame in Toronto

Canada's official national sports are ice hockey and lacrosse. Other major professional games include curling, basketball, baseball, soccer, and football. Great achievements in Canadian sports are recognized by numerous "Halls of Fame" and museums, such as Canada's Sports Hall of Fame.

Canada shares several major professional sports leagues with the United States. Canadian teams in these leagues include seven franchises in the National Hockey League, three Major League Soccer teams, and one team in each of Major League Baseball and the National Basketball Association. Other popular professional competitions include the Canadian Football League, National Lacrosse League, the Canadian Premier League, and the curling tournaments hosted by Curling Canada. Canadians identified hockey as their preferred sport for viewing, followed by soccer and then basketball.

In terms of participation, swimming was the most commonly reported sport by over one-third (35%) of Canadians in 2023. This was closely followed by cycling (33%) and running (27%). The popularity of specific sports varies; in general, the Canadian-born population was more likely to have participated in winter sports such as ice hockey (the most popular young adult team sport), skating, skiing and snowboarding, compared with immigrants, who were more likely to have played soccer (the most popular youth team sport), tennis or basketball. Sports such as golf, volleyball, badminton, bowling, and martial arts are also widely enjoyed at the youth and amateur levels.

The Canada Games is the country's highest-level youth multi-sport event held every two years. Canada has enjoyed success both at the Winter Olympics and the Summer Olympics—particularly the Winter Games as a "winter sports nation". Canada has hosted high-profile international sporting events such as the 1976 Summer Olympics, the 1988 Winter Olympics, the 2010 Winter Olympics, multiple Commonwealth Games, the 2015 FIFA Women's World Cup, the 2015 Pan American Games and 2015 Parapan American Games. The country co-hosted the 2026 FIFA World Cup alongside Mexico and the United States.

== See also ==
- Bibliography of Canada
- List of Canada-related topics by provinces and territories
- Outline of Canada

== Notes ==
This article incorporates content that is under an open licence from Statistics Canada (FAQ)
