= List of countries by number of scientific and technical journal articles =

The following list includes the countries with the highest share of articles published in scientific journals according to the Nature Index 2026, which is valid for the calendar year 2025.

The "count" is the total number of articles to which nationals of the country have contributed. The "share" is lower than the count because for each article it is based on the number of nationals who have contributed, divided by the total number of contributors. In many cases the "share" will be much lower than the "count" because the "count" includes articles published by institutions which may have only a very few members of the relevant nationality out of a very large total membership.

== List ==
Rank	Country or territory	Count	Share	Population	Count per ten million people	Share per ten million people
1	China	59472	52735.17	1,409,670,000	197	164.38
2	United States	37995	26006.15	335,893,238	868	604.14
3	Germany	12483	5827.33	84,607,016	1105	510.44
4	United Kingdom	11955	4819.70	67,596,281	1314	547.66
5	Japan	6869	3890.15	124,000,000	416	238.45
6	France	6855	2850.78	68,394,000	797	328.09
7	South Korea	4649	2827.28	51,293,934	541	317.97
8	India	3620	2437.38	1,400,744,000	17	10.67
9	Canada	5647	2355.77	40,769,890	1040	417.54
10	Italy	5098	1917.22	58,972,268	2159	222.72
11	Australia	5151	1921.36	26,821,557	1312	471.05
12	Spain	4883	1868.02	48,592,909	751	256.67
13	Switzerland	4568	1756.46	8,960,817	4124	1554.88
14	Netherlands	3964	1452.55	17,967,505	1798	641.96
15	Sweden	3072	1019.30	10,549,287	2267	729.31
16	Singapore	2428	900.40	5,917,600	2406	916.91
17	Denmark	2258	826.60	5,961,249	3243	1094.40
18	Taiwan	1653	752.29	23,420,442	491	180.90
19	Israel	1583	707.85	9,880,000	1466	618.92
20	Belgium	2059	688.32	11,820,117	1333	399.10
21	Austria	1825	580.12	9,159,993	1519	438.01
22	Brazil	1550	563.92	203,080,756	54	14.47
23	Poland	1629	528.30	37,620,000	334	88.18
24	Russia	1019	462.66	146,150,789	63	25.98
25	Finland	1302	435.54	5,574,011	1699	496.73
26	Iran	658	377.13	84,055,000	34	13.77
27	Norway	1260	371.66	5,550,203	1805	466.67
28	Czech Republic	1210	369.11	10,900,555	803	189.97
29	Turkey	910	318.40	85,372,377	68	12.17
30	Portugal	968	296.52	10,467,366	615	130.94
31	Saudi Arabia	881	268.36	32,175,224	142	41.26
32	New Zealand	721	209.92	5,305,600	935	255.67
33	Ireland	813	181.36	5,281,600	1197	233.60
34	Mexico	603	181.36	129,625,968	34	6.57
35	Chile	750	175.15	19,960,889	310	57.96
36	Hungary	587	152.34	9,584,000	518	98.65
37	Thailand	604	149.49	66,090,475	56	9.44
38	South Africa	724	149.19	62,027,503	97	16.87
39	Greece	661	140.56	10,413,982	515	79.50
40	Argentina	503	135.92	46,654,581	95	18.33
41	United Arab Emirates	394	101.27	9,282,410	291	40.68
42	Pakistan	422	75.22	241,499,431	11	1.67
43	Slovenia	272	74.99	2,123,103	1361	229.90
44	Malaysia	339	74.94	33,379,500	55	6.30
45	Egypt	396	62.91	104,462,545	20	1.64
46	Vietnam	213	60.74	100,300,000	11	3.61
47	Romania	374	55.72	19,051,562	180	15.53
48	Indonesia	206	52.76	279,118,866	4	0.51
49	Colombia	379	49.51	52,695,952	65	4.59
50	Croatia	258	49.11	3,855,641	547	88.52
51	Estonia	215	33.58	1,366,491	1573	245.74
52	Ukraine	270	30.41	36,700,000	74	8.29
53	Iceland	113	29.53	383,726	2945	769.56
54	Luxembourg	90	29.49	672,020	1339	438.83
55	Kenya	120	19.95	51,526,000	23	3.87
56	Uganda	80	19.4	45,562,000	18	4.26
57	Cyprus	154	18.58	918,100	1677	202.37
58	Slovakia	214	17.24	5,424,687	394	31.78
59	Lithuania	135	15.63	2,886,515	468	54.15
60	Peru	142	13.23	33,725,844	42	3.93
61	Qatar	92	12.76	2,656,032	346	48.04
62	Bulgaria	197	12.75	6,447,710	306	19.77
63	Ecuador	137	13.95	16,938,986	80	8.24
64	Latvia	100	10.72	1,872,500	534	57.25
65	Ethiopia	61	10.4	107,334,000	6	0.97
66	Bangladesh	73	10.24	169,828,911	4	0.60
67	Serbia	219	9.98	6,641,197	330	15.03
68	Morocco	148	9.19	37,022,000	40	2.48
69	Tanzania	76	9.15	61,741,120	12	1.48
70	Nigeria	60	8.9	223,800,000	3	0.40
71	Ghana	43	8.11	30,832,019	14	2.63
72	Uzbekistan	48	6.97	36,963,262	13	1.89
73	Uruguay	34	6.81	3,444,263	99	19.77
74	Lebanon	41	6.15	5,490,000	75	11.20
75	Panama	41	6.02	4,064,780	101	14.81
76	Malawi	35	5.93	21,507,723	16	2.76
77	Oman	22	5.75	5,113,071	43	11.25
78	Kazakhstan	35	5.43	20,075,271	17	2.70
79	Costa Rica	38	4.92	5,262,225	665	0.00
80	Georgia	190	4.83	3,736,400	509	12.93
81	Philippines	135	4.44	112,892,781	12	0.39
82	Burkina Faso	25	4.41	22,752,315	11	1.94
83	Zambia	32	4.36	19,610,769	16	2.22
84	Armenia	116	4.33	2,993,800	387	14.46
85	Rwanda	19	4.29	13,246,394	14	3.24
86	Mozambique	30	4.11	32,419,747	9	1.27
87	Jordan	21	4.1	11,516,000	18	3.56
88	Nepal	40	3.99	29,164,578	14	1.37
89	Zimbabwe	29	3.75	15,178,979	19	2.47
90	Congo	28	3.51	95,370,000	3	0.37
91	Mali	15	3.44	22,395,489	7	1.54
92	Malta	31	3.31	519,562	597	63.71
93	North Macedonia	26	3.03	1,832,696	142	16.53
94	Gambia	21	2.93	2,417,471	87	12.12
N/A	Central America-4 (Note: Including El Salvador, Guatemala, Honduras and Nicaragua)	N/A	2.89	40,514,214	N/A	0.71
95	Cuba	49	2.83	11,089,511	44	2.55
96	Belarus	17	2.73	9,200,617	18	2.97
97	Tunisia	17	2.73	11,850,232	14	2.30
98	Azerbaijan	135	2.72	10,151,517	133	2.68
99	Mongolia	77	2.57	3,457,548	223	7.43
100	Myanmar	16	2.48	55,770,232	3	0.44
101	Madagascar	17	2.4	26,923,353	6	0.89
102	Cameroon	27	2.35	28,088,845	10	0.84
103	Sri Lanka	84	2.22	22,037,000	38	1.01
104	North Korea	4	2.22	25,660,000	2	0.87
105	Senegal	13	2.22	18,275,743	7	1.21
106	Botswana	15	1.9	2,410,338	62	7.88
107	French Polynesia	12	1.86	279,890	429	66.45
108	Cambodia	8	1.79	17,091,464	5	1.05
109	Benin	17	1.78	12,606,998	13	1.41
110	Ivory Coast	19	1.69	29,389,150	6	0.58
111	Monaco	12	1.63	38,367	3128	424.84
112	International	18	1.57	8,104,267,000	0	0.00
113	Nicaragua	8	1.4	6,733,763	12	2.08
114	Algeria	7	1.38	45,400,000	2	0.30
115	Liberia	8	1.34	5,248,621	15	2.55
116	Guatemala	19	1.26	17,602,431	11	0.72
117	Namibia	11	1.25	3,022,401	36	4.14
118	Venezuela	20	1.24	28,302,000	7	0.44
119	Kuwait	75	1.23	4,670,713	161	2.63
120	Greenland	10	1.16	56,865	1759	203.99
121	Bolivia	17	1.12	12,006,031	14	0.93
122	Vanuatu	3	1.05	301,295	100	34.85
123	Haiti	11	1	11,743,017	9	0.85
124	Syria	1	1	22,923,000	0	0.44
125	Iraq	12	0.99	43,324,000	3	0.23
126	Sierra Leone	6	0.79	8,494,260	7	0.93
127	Paraguay	9	0.78	6,109,644	15	1.28
128	Niger	5	0.76	25,369,415	2	0.30
129	Mauritius	12	0.8	1,261,041	95	6.27
130	Laos	9	0.64	7,443,000	12	0.86
131	Guinea-Bissau	1	0.58	1,781,308	6	3.26
132	Togo	6	0.51	8,095,498	7	0.63
133	Lesotho	5	0.51	2,306,000	22	2.21
134	Kyrgyzstan	6	0.48	7,100,000	8	0.68
135	Tajikistan	4	0.47	10,077,600	4	0.47
136	Angola	5	0.44	34,094,077	1	0.13
137	Jamaica	7	0.41	2,825,544	25	1.45
138	Palestinian territories	50	0.41	5,483,450	91	0.75
139	Kosovo	3	0.39	1,762,220	17	2.21
140	South Sudan	1	0.36	14,746,494	1	0.24
141	Bahamas	4	0.36	397,360	101	9.06
142	Sudan	7	0.35	41,984,500	2	0.08
143	Dominican Republic	9	0.34	10,760,028	8	0.32
144	Somalia	2	0.34	18,143,379	1	0.19
145	Seychelles	10	0.32	100,447	996	31.86
146	Moldova	8	0.32	2,512,758	32	1.27
147	Guinea	3	0.3	13,261,638	2	0.23
148	Bahrain	6	0.29	1,577,059	38	1.84
149	Fiji	6	0.29	893,468	67	3.25
150	Eritrea	2	0.29	3,748,902	5	0.77
151	Yemen	4	0.29	31,888,698	1	0.09
152	Reunion	5	0.28	885,700	56	3.16
153	Saint Vincent and the Grenadines	3	0.24	110,872	271	21.65
154	Andorra	5	0.24	85,101	588	28.20
155	Antigua and Barbuda	3	0.23	100,772	298	22.82
156	Brunei	7	0.23	445,400	157	5.16
157	Maldives	3	0.2	515,132	58	3.88
158	Papua New Guinea	6	0.18	11,781,559	5	0.15
159	East Timor	3	0.17	1,354,662	22	1.25
160	Trinidad and Tobago	7	0.17	1,367,510	51	1.24
161	Cape Verde	6	0.15	491,233	122	3.05
162	Afghanistan	1	0.14	34,262,840	0	0.04
163	Montenegro	60	0.14	616,695	973	2.27
164	Honduras	34	0.12	9,745,149	35	0.12
165	Albania	7	0.12	2,761,785	25	0.43
166	El Salvador	5	0.11	6,884,888	7	0.16
167	Liechtenstein	4	0.1	40,023	999	24.99
168	Martinique	1	0.1	349,925	29	2.86
169	Vatican City State (Holy See)	5	0.09	764	65445	1178.01
170	Swaziland	2	0.09	1,223,362	16	0.74
171	Guadeloupe	2	0.09	378,561	53	2.38
172	Bosnia and Herzegovina	7	0.09	3,277,082	21	0.27
173	Palau	2	0.08	16,733	1195	47.81
174	Tonga	2	0.07	100,179	200	6.99
175	Guyana	7	0.07	743,699	94	0.94
176	Libya	2	0.07	6,931,061	3	0.10
177	Samoa	7	0.06	205,557	341	2.92
178	Bhutan	3	0.06	770,276	39	0.78
179	Faroe Islands	2	0.05	54,547	367	9.17
180	Grenada	2	0.05	112,579	178	4.44
181	Comoros	1	0.05	758,316	13	0.66
182	Burundi	2	0.02	12,837,740	2	0.02
183	Barbados	5	0.02	267,800	187	0.75
184	Suriname	3	0.02	616,500	49	0.32
185	Saint Lucia	1	0.01	47,195	56	0.56
185	Saint Kitts and Nevis	1	0.01	178,696	212	2.12
186	Gabon	2	0.01	2,233,272	9	0.04
187	Kiribati	1	0.01	120,740	83	0.83
188	Netherlands Antilles	1	0	337,617	30	0.00
189	Dominica	1	0	67,408	148	0.00
190	Solomon Islands	2	0	734,887	27	0.00
191	Cook Islands	1	0	15,040	66	0.00
192	San Marino	1	0	33,916	295	0.00
193	Belize	1	0	397,483	25	0.00
193	Turkmenistan	1	0	7,057,841	1	0.00

== See also ==
- List of cities by scientific output
