= Offshore drilling in Atlantic Canada =

In addition to terrestrial oil wells, Canada also extracts oil via offshore drilling.

== Production by province ==
=== Newfoundland and Labrador ===
Newfoundland and Labrador is the third largest petroleum producer in Canada, making up 4.4% of Canada's petroleum. As of 2015, the province produced over 27,370 m^{3} per day of light crude oil from the Grand Banks offshore oil fields. The Jeanne d'Arc Basin is the province's most active oil field project.

=== Nova Scotia ===
The offshore oil industry of Nova Scotia accounts for about 0.07% of Canadian petroleum production. The majority of its offshore industry is located on the Nova Scotian continental Shelf, within the Sable Island offshore natural gas fields. In 2015, Nova Scotia produced 438 m^{3} of liquid natural gas per day. As of 2019, that figure is up to 3,200 m^{3} per day.

== Production ==
=== Jeanne d'Arc Basin ===
The Jeanne d'Arc Basin is located about 340 km to the southeast from the Island of Newfoundland, Canada. The geological region is defined by an offshore sedimentary basin covering an area greater than 6000 km^{3} and 20 km in depth. Hydrocarbon exploration first began during the 1960s by Amoco and Imperial Oil. Exploration wells indicated the potential of the basin for active petroleum drilling. In 1979, the first major well began pumping operations.

=== Sable Offshore Energy Project ===
Since 1999, the Sable Offshore Energy Project (SOEP) is an ongoing initiative to conduct natural gas exploration along the Nova Scotian continental Shelf. This project produces over 14,000,000 m^{3} of natural gas and 3,200 m^{3} of liquid natural gas daily. The major partners include ExxonMobil, Shell Canada, Imperial Oil, and Pengrowth Energy.

=== Shelburne Basin Venture Exploration Drilling Project ===
Beginning in 2013, this exploratory hydrocarbon drilling project was conducted by Shell Canada about 250 km southeast of Halifax, Nova Scotia. Between 2013 and 2015, seven exploration wells have been proposed. The project took place in the Shelburne Basin, which has been a consistent source for Nova Scotian hydrocarbon production.

== Oil fields ==
=== Hebron-Ben Nevis oil field ===
The Hebron-Ben Nevis oil field is located 350 km east from the coast of Newfoundland, situated in the Jeanne d'Arc Basin. The oil field was discovered in 1981, however only began production in 2017. An estimated 700 million barrels of light crude oil exist within the oil field.

=== Hibernia oil field ===
The Hibernia oil field is located 315 km from the east from Newfoundland in 80 m of water. The Hibernia platform is the world's largest oil platform by weight and size. The oil field was discovered in 1979 but production only began in 2007. The total oil field production is an estimated 704 million barrels as of 2010. The regional reserves is an estimated 1,395 million barrels of oil.

=== Terra Nova oil field ===
The Terra Nova oil field is located 350 km east off the coast of Newfoundland. This site was developed by Petro-Canada in 1984, and is the second largest oil field on Canada's East coast. Production began in 2002 and is expected to last about 17 years. Other partners include Suncor Energy, Exxon Mobil Canada, and Cenovus (formerly Husky Energy).

=== White Rose oil field ===
The White Rose oil field is located about 350 km east from the coast of Newfoundland. Husky Energy is the largest operator, owning 72.5% interest. This field was discovered in 1984 and began operations in 2005. The oil field consists of both oil and gas pools covering an area of approximately 40 km^{2} and containing an estimated 440 million barrels of oil.
