= Edie Parker (artist) =

Canadian sculptor (1956)

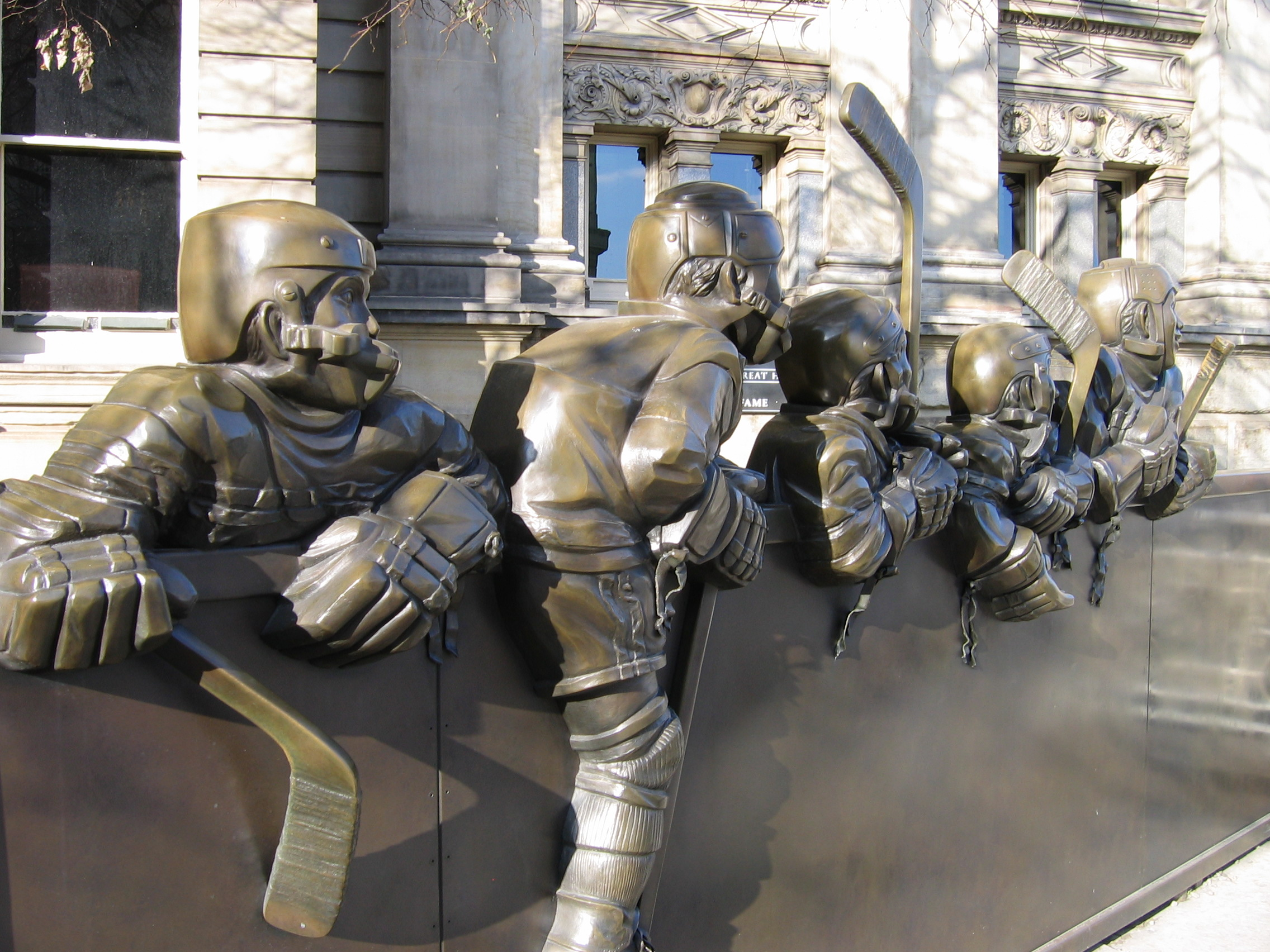
Visitors to the Hockey Hall of Fame make a point of having their photos taken with the Our Game sculpture.

Edie Parker (formerly Edit Martinko) is a Canadian sculptor, illustrator and a designer. Born in Hungary in 1956, Parker gained prominence as a Canadian artist for her sculpture entitled Our Game, a homage to Canada's national passion of hockey, in bronze, 5.2 metres (17 ft) x 0.46 metres (1.5 ft) x 2.0 metres (6.5 ft), which stands in front of the Hockey Hall of Fame in Toronto, Ontario, at the corner of Yonge and Front Streets, where it was unveiled in 1993.

Coming to Canada aged 19, Parker studied fine arts at Mohawk College and the Ontario College of Art & Design. She was commissioned to design and sculpt Our Game while working at Design Workshop Inc2 as a designer and sculptor under the directorship of Ken Young, the exhibition designer and director. The bronze statue was cast and installed by art foundry MST Bronze Limited.
