= List of exports of Canada =

Exports of Canada by product category (2019) Chemical products Transportation Machines Mineral products Plastics and rubbers Metals Foodstuffs Precious metals Textiles Instruments Animal products Vegetable products Paper goods Footwear and headwear Miscellaneous Stone and glass Wood products Animal and vegetable bi-products Animal hides Arts and antiques Weapons

Canada's global trade in 2024 is estimated to be US$569.17B, as per the United Nations COMTRADE database. The United States, China, and the United Kingdom were the primary nations that Canada traded with. The main items Canada exported included mineral fuels, oils, products from distillation, vehicles that are not trains or trams, and machinery like nuclear reactors and boilers.

#	Exports by category	Value (US$)
1	Mineral fuels, oils, distillation products	$145.70B
2	Cars	$57.98B
3	Machinery, nuclear reactors, boilers	$41.03B
4	Pearls, precious stones, metals, coins	$33.20B
5	Commodities not specified	$21.44B
6	Electrical, electronic equipment	$17.45B
7	Plastics	$16.04B
8	Wood	$13.55B
9	Aircraft, spacecraft	$13.55B
10	Aluminum	$12.81B
11	Ores slag and ash	$11.69B
12	Pharmaceutical products	$11.30B
13	Cereals	$9.37B
14	Iron and steel	$9.05B
15	Optical, photo, technical, medical apparatus	$8.44B
16	Oil seed, oleagic fruits, grain, seed, fruits	$8.01B
17	Paper and paperboard, articles of pulp, paper and board	$7.92B
18	Meat	$7.46B
19	Milk preparations and products	$7.21B
20	Inorganic chemicals, precious metal compound, isotope	$7.16B
