= Global Affairs Canada =

Foreign affairs department

- Affaires mondiales Canada (French)

Department overview
- Formed: 1909 (as the Department of External Affairs)
- Type: Department responsible for: Foreign relations; International trade; Consular services; International development; Humanitarian assistance
- Employees: 12,158 (2019–20)
- Annual budget: CA$7.1 billion (2018–19)
- Ministers responsible: Anita Anand, Minister of Foreign Affairs; Maninder Sidhu, Minister of International Trade
- Deputy Ministers responsible: Arun Thangaraj, Deputy Minister of Foreign Affairs; Glenn Purves, Deputy Minister of International Trade; Cynthia Termorshuizen, Deputy Minister of International Development; David Angell, Assoc. Deputy Minister of Foreign Affairs
- Key document: Department of Foreign Affairs, Trade and Development Act
- Website: www.international.gc.ca

Footnotes
- References

Global Affairs Canada (GAC; French: Affaires mondiales Canada; AMC) (Note: Global Affairs Canada is the applied title under the Federal Identity Program; the legal title is the Department of Foreign Affairs, Trade and Development (French: Ministère des Affaires étrangères, du Commerce et du Développement).) is the department of the Government of Canada that manages Canada's diplomatic and consular relations, promotes Canadian international trade, and leads Canada's international development and humanitarian assistance. Its diplomatic and consular offices act on behalf of all government departments. The department contains within it the official chief officer and supportive staff for Canada's Office of Protocol.

According to the OECD, Canada's total official development assistance (ODA) (US$7.8 billion, preliminary data) increased in 2022 due to exceptional support to Ukraine and its pandemic response in developing countries, increased costs for in-donor refugees as well as higher contributions to international organizations, representing 0.37% of gross national income (GNI).

== History ==
The department has undergone numerous name changes and re-organizations since its founding in 1909. Originally established as the "Department of External Affairs", GAC has been known by a variety of names throughout its lifetime. Its current legal name is the Department of Foreign Affairs, Trade and Development, but its "applied" name used within government is Global Affairs Canada often shorted in the Canadian media to simply "Global Affairs".

=== Origins (early 20th century) ===
GAC was first founded as the Department of External Affairs on 1 June 1909.

During and after World War I, Canada assumed greater control over its foreign relations, with its full autonomy in this field confirmed by the Statute of Westminster in 1931. For historical reasons, the name External Affairs was retained.

The Department of Trade and Commerce, which included the Trade Commissioner Service, had been created in 1892. In 1969, it was combined with the Department of Industry to form the Department of Industry Trade and Commerce (ITC). Both External Affairs and ITC maintained networks of offices abroad, with varying degrees of coordination among them. The Department of Citizenship and Immigration also had offices abroad, in some cases dating back to Confederation.

=== Reorganization (1970s–80s) ===
In the 1970s and early 1980s, there were growing efforts to ensure coordination among all Canadian government offices outside Canada and to strengthen the leadership role and authority of heads of post (ambassadors, high commissioners, and consuls general) over all Canadian government staff in their areas of accreditation. This led to a 1979 decision by Prime Minister Joe Clark to consolidate the various streams of the Canadian Foreign Service, including the "political" (traditional diplomatic) stream, the Trade Commissioner Service, and the Immigration Foreign Service.

This was followed in 1982 by Prime Minister Pierre Trudeau's decision to combine External Affairs and International Trade into a single department. It initially retained the name of Department of External Affairs, but was subsequently renamed External Affairs and International Trade. The change was reflected in a new Department of External Affairs Act passed in 1983. The 1982 merger was part of larger reorganization of government that also combined the Industry component of ITC with the Department of Regional Economic Expansion.

=== Department of Foreign Affairs and International Trade (1993–95) ===
The department's name was changed to the Department of Foreign Affairs and International Trade (DFAIT) in 1993, about 60 years after Canada had gained control over its foreign policy in 1931—though this change was only formalized by an Act of Parliament in 1995. DFAIT maintained two separate ministers: the Minister of Foreign Affairs, with lead responsibility for the portfolio, and the Minister of International Trade. The Minister for International Cooperation, who was responsible for agencies such as the Canadian International Development Agency (CIDA), also fell under DFAIT. Moreover, the responsibilities of DFAIT would include Canadian relations with Commonwealth nations—though such nations are not considered 'foreign' to one another.

CIDA had been formally established in 1968, although a preceding External Aid Office was created as a branch of the External Affairs Department in 1960, building on roots that go back to the Colombo Plan in the early 1950s.

=== Recent developments (21st century) ===
Through an administrative separation of the Department of Foreign Affairs and International Trade, two separate departments named Foreign Affairs Canada (FAC) and International Trade Canada (ITCan) were created in December 2003. However, legislation to formally abolish DFAIT and provide a statutory basis for the separate departments failed to pass a first vote in the House of Commons on 15 February 2005. The government, nonetheless, maintained the administrative separation of the two departments despite neither having been established through an Act of Parliament.

In early 2006, under the new government of Prime Minister Stephen Harper, Foreign Affairs Canada and International Trade Canada were re-joined to again form a single department known as Foreign Affairs and International Trade Canada.

In 2013, included within the Conservative government's omnibus budget bill, An Act to implement certain provisions of the budget tabled in Parliament on March 21, 2013 and other measures (Bill C-60), was a section that would fold CIDA into the department, creating the Department of Foreign Affairs, Trade and Development (DFATD). The bill received royal assent on 26 June 2013.

On 4 November 2015, Prime Minister Justin Trudeau's new Liberal government again modified the name of the department. While its legal name remains the Department of Foreign Affairs, Trade and Development, its public designation (applied title) under the Federal Identity Program is Global Affairs Canada (GAC). Despite the change to the applied title of the department, the senior minister responsible is still called the Minister of Foreign Affairs, rather than "Minister of Global Affairs", in line with the terminology used in other jurisdictions and in international law.

== Functions and structure ==
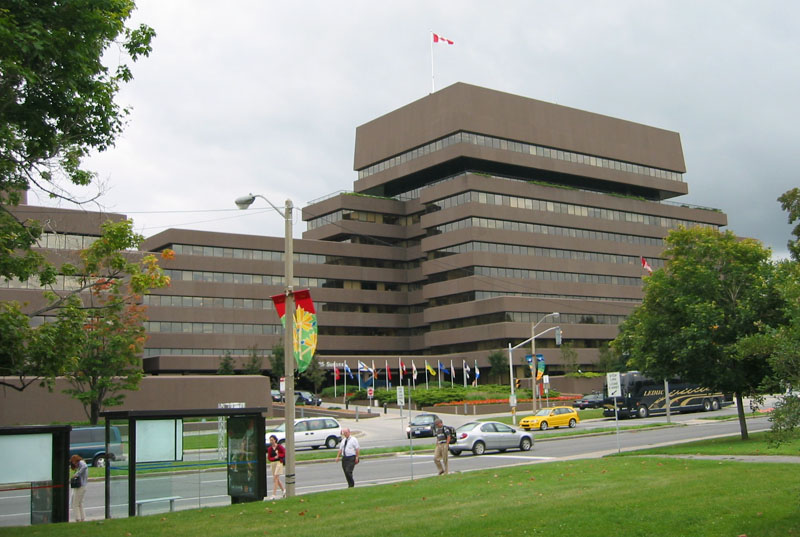
Global Affairs Canada's headquarters, the Lester B. Pearson Building in Ottawa

GAC is headquartered in the Lester B. Pearson Building at 125 Sussex Drive on the banks of the Rideau River in Ottawa, but operates out of several properties in Canada's National Capital Region.

=== Ministers ===
Ministers and parliamentary secretaries to ministers are elected members of the House of Commons and accountable to Parliament. Ministers are also members of the cabinet and privy council (and thus entitled to use the prefix "the Honourable"). The current leadership of GAC is provided by three ministers, each with their own responsibilities.

The minister of foreign affairs (as of 2025 Anita Anand) is the senior minister in the department, with responsibility for foreign policy matters as well as the department overall. This ministerial portfolio includes:

- Asia Pacific Foundation of Canada
- International Joint Commission
- Permanent Joint Board on Defense
- Roosevelt Campobello International Park Commission

The portfolio of the Secretary of State (International Development) (currently Randeep Sarai) is responsible for international development, poverty reduction, and humanitarian assistance. This ministerial portfolio includes:

- Asia-Pacific Economic Cooperation Business Advisory Council
- Development finance institutions
  - African Development Bank
  - Asian Development Bank
  - Inter-American Development Bank
  - Caribbean Development Bank
- International Development Research Centre (IDRC)

The minister of international trade (currently Maninder Sidhu) is responsible for matters of international trade. This ministerial portfolio includes:

- Business Development Bank of Canada
- Canadian Commercial Corporation (CCC)
- Export Development Canada (EDC)
- Invest in Canada
- Office of the Extractive Sector Corporate Social Responsibility Counsellor
- Trade Commissioner Service
- Canadian Foreign Service Institute (CFSI)

The institute is Global Affairs Canada's primary training provider. It offers training to clients in federal, provincial, and municipal governments, as well as to non-governmental organizations, foreign governments and organizations, academic institutions, and, in certain cases, private sector companies.

=== Current departmental structure ===
Deputy ministers are senior public servants who take political direction from ministers and are responsible for the day-to-day operations of the department.

The current departmental structure, and corresponding executives, are as follows:

- Minister of Foreign Affairs
    - Parliamentary Secretary to the Minister of Foreign Affairs
    - Deputy Minister of Foreign Affairs
      - Associate Deputy Minister of Foreign Affairs
        - North America
        - Latin America and the Caribbean
        - Europe, Middle East and the Maghreb
        - Asia & Africa
  - Minister of International Development
    - Parliamentary Secretary to the Minister of International Development
    - Deputy Minister of International Development
      - International Development Research Centre
      - International Assistance Operations
  - Minister of International Trade, Export Promotion, Small Business and Economic Development
    - Parliamentary Secretary to the Minister of Small Business, Export Promotion and International Trade
    - Deputy Minister of International Trade
      - Trade Commissioner Service
      - Export Development Canada
      - Canadian Commercial Corporation
      - Office of the Extractive Sector Corporate Social Responsibility Counsellor

Branches of Global Affairs each have their own Assistant Deputy Minister, who report to all three deputy ministers:

- Strategic Planning and Policy
- Consular, Security and Emergency Management Branch
- Global Issues
- International Security
- International Business Development, Investment & Innovation
- Trade Policy & Negotiation
- International Platform
- Legal Advisor
- Human Resources
- Corporate Finance and Operations

== Organizations ==
Included in the portfolios of the three Global Affairs ministers are:

- Crown corporations:
  1. Business Development Bank of Canada
  2. Canadian Commercial Corporation (CCC)
  3. Export Development Canada (EDC)
  4. International Development Research Centre (IDRC)
  5. Invest in Canada
- shared-governance corporations (responsibility of Foreign Affairs minister):
  1. Asia Pacific Foundation of Canada
  2. International Joint Commission
  3. Permanent Joint Board on Defense
  4. Roosevelt Campobello International Park Commission
- international organizations:
  1. African Development Bank
  2. Asian Development Bank
  3. Inter-American Development Bank
  4. Caribbean Development Bank
  5. Asia-Pacific Economic Cooperation Business Advisory Council

== Nomenclature ==
The change of terminology from external affairs to foreign affairs recognized, albeit belatedly, a shift that had occurred many years before.

At the time that the external affairs portfolio was created in 1909, Canada was a self-governing dominion in the British Empire and did not have an independent foreign policy. The term external affairs avoided the question of whether a colony or dominion—self-governing and hence sovereign in some respects—could, by definition, have foreign affairs. Implicitly, since the department was responsible for affairs with both Commonwealth and non-Commonwealth countries, all external relations were of a type, even when the head of state was shared with other nations.

Under section 132 of the British North America Act, 1867, the federal government had authority to conduct and implement relations with other parts of the British Empire, which were not considered foreign lands. The United Kingdom and other colonial powers still routinely divided their conduct of overseas policy into foreign affairs (e.g. the Foreign Office) and domestic or colonial affairs (the Colonial Office or Dominion Office, which were later reorganized and combined into one department: the Foreign and Commonwealth Office). Canadian interests outside the empire (e.g. between Canada and its non-empire neighbours, the United States, Russia, St. Pierre and Miquelon, and Greenland) were under the purview of the UK Foreign Office. Informally, however, Canada had had relations with the United States in particular, with trade and other relationships pre-dating Confederation.

== Foreign relations ==
Canada's management of its own foreign relations evolved over time, with key milestones including: the First World War (at the conclusion of which Canada was a signatory of the Treaty of Versailles and a member of the League of Nations); the Balfour Declaration; increased direct conduct of bilateral matters with the United States (where Canada had its own representatives since at least 1927); and finally, the Statute of Westminster and the Second World War. In terms of Canada's commercial relations, the first trade commissioner, John Short Larke, was named following a successful trade delegation to Australia led by Canada's first minister of trade and commerce, Mackenzie Bowell.

The Statute of Westminster clarified that Canada (and certain other dominions, such as Australia and New Zealand) were primarily responsible for, among other things, the conduct of their own foreign affairs. After World War II, Canada was a founding member of the United Nations and participant in its own right in post-war settlement talks and other international fora, and in most respects the conduct of foreign affairs was no longer colonial.

Over the years after the Second World War, a number of other historical traditions were slowly abolished or brought into accordance with reality, such as the practice of Canadian ambassadors presenting diplomatic credentials signed by the monarch of Canada (including, on occasion, credentials written in French as an official language of Canada); Canadian ambassadors now present credentials signed by the governor general of Canada as representative of the Canadian monarch. Other traditions remain, such as the exchange of high commissioners, instead of ambassadors, between Commonwealth countries. (High commissioners present credentials from the head of government [the prime minister], as the head of state was historically shared, and would not accredit a representative to one's self.) Nonetheless, by the time the change in terminology was effected in 1993, Canada's foreign affairs had been conducted separately from the United Kingdom in most significant respects for the entire post-war period, or over 60 years since the Statute of Westminster.

This process was paralleled in other areas over this period, including the establishment of Canada's own supreme court as the court of last resort, the patriation of the constitution, and Canadian citizenship (Canadians had been British subjects, and no citizenship per se existed until 1947).

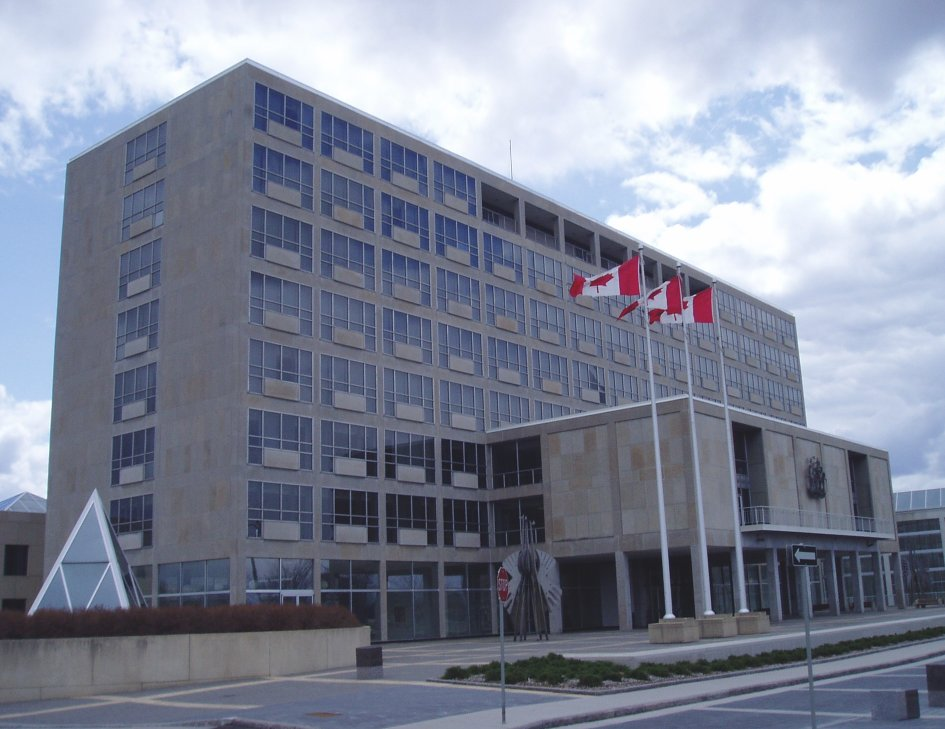
John G. Diefenbaker Building, 111 Sussex Avenue, is home to most of the employees working on international trade. It also hosts a number of secondary and support offices.

In September 2012, the Canadian Department of Foreign Affairs and the UK Foreign and Commonwealth Office signed a memorandum of understanding on diplomatic cooperation, which promotes the co-location of embassies, the joint provision of consular services, and common crisis response. The project has been criticized by leading Canadian foreign affairs scholars for undermining Ottawa's foreign policy independence.

=== International Development and Humanitarian Assistance ===
Global Affairs Canada funds humanitarian projects, contributes to the United Nations Central Emergency Response Fund, makes smaller emergency contributions through the Canadian Red Cross and Canadian Foodgrains Bank and funds Canadian humanitarian organisations via the Humanitarian Coalition.

Support is guided by Canada's Feminist International Assistance Policy.

=== International trade ===
Within Global Affairs Canada, there are several bodies that facilitate Canada's international trade system, including the Trade Controls Bureau, Export Development Canada, Canadian Commercial Corporation, and the Trade Commissioner Service. Other organizations that facilitate international trade and foreign investment in Canada include the Canada Border Services Agency (CBSA), Invest in Canada (formerly Foreign Investment Review Agency), and the Canadian International Trade Tribunal, which is an independent quasi-judicial body. The CBSA and Statistics Canada collect information on all items exported from Canada, and classify these items using categories negotiated by the World Customs Organization.

Trade agreements and systems with Canada
Trade agreement / system	Status	Type	Partner states
Canada–Central American Four Free Trade Agreement	Never implemented	Free trade agreement (FTA)	Central American Four (Guatemala, El Salvador, Honduras, and Nicaragua)
Canada–Chile Free Trade Agreement	In effect	Bilateral FTA	Chile
Canada–China Promotion and Reciprocal Protection of Investments Agreement	In effect	Bilateral investment treaty	China
Canada–Colombia Free Trade Agreement	In effect	Bilateral FTA	Colombia
Canada–Costa Rica Free Trade Agreement	In effect	Bilateral FTA	Costa Rica
Canada–European Free Trade Association Free Trade Agreement	In effect	FTA	European Free Trade Association (Iceland, Norway, Switzerland, and Liechtenstein)
Canada–Honduras Free Trade Agreement	In effect	FTA	Honduras
Canada–India Comprehensive Economic Partnership Agreement	Under negotiations, as of 2020	Bilateral FTA, whose negotiations launched in 2010	India
Canada–Israel Free Trade Agreement	In effect	Bilateral FTA	Israel
Canada–Jordan Free Trade Agreement	In effect, since October 2012	Bilateral FTA	Jordan
Canada–Korea Free Trade Agreement	In effect	Bilateral FTA	South Korea
Canada–Panama Free Trade Agreement	In effect	Bilateral FTA	Panama
Canada–Peru Free Trade Agreement	In effect	Bilateral FTA	Peru
Canada–Ukraine Free Trade Agreement	In effect	Bilateral FTA	Ukraine
Canada–United States Free Trade Agreement (CUSFTA)	Superseded by NAFTA in 1994	Bilateral FTA	United States
Comprehensive and Progressive Agreement for Trans-Pacific Partnership	In effect	Multilateral FTA	Australia, Brunei, Chile, Japan, Malaysia, Mexico, New Zealand, Peru, Singapore, and Vietnam
Comprehensive Economic and Trade Agreement (CETA)	In effect	Bilateral FTA	European Union
Free Trade Area of the Americas	Never implemented	Proposed agreement	Countries of the Americas, excluding Cuba.
North American Free Trade Agreement (NAFTA)	Superseded by USMCA in July 2020	Trilateral agreement	United States and Mexico
North American Union	N/A	Theoretical continental union	United States and Mexico
United States–Mexico–Canada Agreement (USMCA)	In effect	Trilateral agreement superseding NAFTA in July 2020	

== Arms ==
Coat of arms of Canadian Ambassadors Alumni Association (Amb Canada)
Adopted 2024 Crest A truss bridge Argent Escutcheon Per fess enarched Azure and tessellated of maple leaves Argent and Gules, in chief a dove volant Argent Supporters Two hippogriffs Or beaked, armed, unguled and winged Argent, each supporting a caduceus Gules and charged on the shoulder with a torteau, that to the dexter bearing an astrolabe that to the sinister set with eight billets their bases inwards, both supporters standing on a round tabletop draped Argent Motto FORIS CANADÆ PRODESSE; (In the service of Canada abroad)

== See also ==
- List of ambassadors and high commissioners of Canada
- Defence Liaison Two
- Notable Canadian diplomats
  - Norman Robertson
  - Lester B. Pearson
  - Norman Robinson
  - Kenneth D. Taylor
  - Humphrey Hume Wrong
- History of Canadian foreign policy
