= Immigration law =

National government policies

Immigration law includes the national statutes, regulations, and legal precedents governing immigration into and deportation from a country. Strictly speaking, it is distinct from other matters such as naturalization and citizenship, although they are sometimes conflated. Countries frequently maintain laws that regulate both the rights of entry and exit as well as internal rights, such as the duration of stay, freedom of movement, and the right to participate in commerce or government.

== Variation ==
Immigration laws vary around the world and throughout history, according to the social and political climate of the place and time, as the acceptance of immigrants sways from the widely inclusive to the deeply nationalist and isolationist. National laws regarding the immigration of citizens of that country are regulated by international law. The United Nations' International Covenant on Civil and Political Rights mandates that all countries allow entry to their own citizens. This principle is not always respected in practice. For instance, during the COVID-19 pandemic, Australia adopted a policy of denying entry to all individuals in particularly affected jurisdictions, including Australian citizens and permanent residents. Similarly, while states within the Schengen Area typically permit freedom of movement across borders, many states within the area implemented ad hoc border controls during the pandemic.

Immigration policy is the aspect of border control concerning the transit of people into a country, especially those that intend to stay and work in the country. Taxation, tariff and trade rules set out what goods immigrants may bring with them, and what services they may perform while temporarily in the country. Agricultural policy may make exemptions for migrant farm workers, who typically enter a country only for the harvest season and then return home to a country or region in the Global South (such as Mexico or Jamaica from where U.S. and Canada, respectively, often import temporary agricultural labour). An important aspect of immigration policy is the treatment of refugees, more or less helpless or stateless people who throw themselves on the mercy of the state they try to enter, seeking refuge from actual or purported poor treatment in their country of origin. Asylum is sometimes granted to those who face persecution or a well-founded fear of persecution on account of race, religion, nationality, membership of a particular social group, or political opinion.

As a result of investment-oriented immigration policies, states sometimes implement border control measures known as immigrant investor programmes that offer permanent residence or citizenship in return for investment. Immigrant investor programmes originated in the 1980s when tax havens in the Pacific and Caribbean began "cash-for-passport" programmes that facilitated visa-free travel and tax avoidance. Such programmes have sparked controversy in several countries. A lack of demonstrable economic benefits, and security concerns, have been among the most common criticisms. In 2014 the Canadian government suspended their golden visa programme (although, as of 2017, Quebec maintains its own golden visa programme). The implementation of such programmes in Europe has been criticised by the European Parliament, which approved a non-binding resolution that in 2014 declaring that an EU passport, which by definition provides its bearer the right to reside in any EU or EEA jurisdiction, should not have a "price tag".

=== Critical theory ===
Critical theory can be used to interpret the right of asylum and immigration law.

== By country or territory ==
Countries, citizenship, and immigration law
Country or Area	Nationality	Immigration	Details	Changes to immigration law
US	United States nationality law	Immigration to the US; Illegal immigration to the US	Citizenship may be granted after 5 years of permanent residence. Green Card Lottery	
United Kingdom	British nationality law Some commonwealth citizens have right of abode in the UK, which, for most practical purposes, gives them the same rights as British Citizens in the UK.Clayton, Gina (2021). "Right of abode". Textbook on Immigration and Asylum Law (9th ed.). Oxford University Press.	Immigration to the UK; Historical immigration to Great Britain; Illegal immigration to the UK; After 20 years of continuous illegal but proven presence in the country ILR is provided.[citation needed]	A foreigner may apply for naturalisation after having had indefinite leave to remain for one year in addition to 5 years of residency, or (treaty nationals) may apply after having been resident in the United Kingdom for 5 years. Treaty nationals may enter the UK to reside there as self-sufficient migrant.	The law has been changed retrospectively in the past and likely to change retrospectively in the future.
Canada	Canadian nationality law	Immigration to Canada; Illegal immigration to Canada		
Australia	Australian nationality law	Immigration to Australia; Illegal immigration to Australia		
New Zealand	New Zealand nationality law	Immigration to New Zealand		
South Africa	South African nationality law	Immigration to South Africa; Illegal immigration to South Africa	Citizenship may be applied for after 5 years of permanent residence. Permit, visa, and other legal services exist	
Guernsey			Guernsey's inhabitants are full British citizens	
Jersey				
Gibraltar			None of the overseas territories has its own nationality status, and most residents hold two forms of British nationality: British Overseas Territories citizenship (BOTC) and British citizenship.	
Isle of Man			Citizenship is covered by UK law, and Manx people are classed as British citizens.	
South Korea	South Korean nationality law	Immigration to South Korea; Illegal immigration to South Korea	Citizenship may be applied upon meeting the requirements for naturalization. If the Korean government recognizes that you made an important contribution to the nation, you are eligible for F-5 permanent residence.[citation needed]	
Hong Kong		Immigration to Hong Kong Mainland China issued a daily quota of 150 One Way Permits to mainland Chinese for Hong Kong settlement; will receive Right of Abode (ROA) in Hong Kong, after 7 years continuous ordinary residence in Hong Kong; plus the right to apply for a HKSAR Passport.	A foreigner who is a Hong Kong Permanent ID Card holder may naturalise as a Chinese national with HKSAR Passport, if applicant: has settle in Hong Kong or Chinese territory; has near relatives of Chinese nationals; and/or other reasons deemed as legitimate.	
India	Indian nationality law	Illegal immigration to India	Citizenship may be granted after 12 years of residence (of which 1 year should be continuous).	
Israel	Israeli nationality law	Aliyah; Immigration to Israel from Arab lands; Illegal immigration to Israel	Law of Return	
European Union	Citizenship of the European Union	Immigration to Europe		
Austria	Austrian nationality law	Immigration to Austria		
Belgium	Belgian nationality law	Immigration to Belgium		
Bulgaria	Bulgarian nationality law	Immigration to Bulgaria		
Cyprus	Cypriot nationality law			
Czech Republic	Czech nationality law	Immigration to the Czech Republic		
Denmark	Danish nationality law	Immigration to Denmark		
Estonia	Estonian nationality law	Immigration to Estonia		
Finland	Finnish nationality law	Immigration to Finland		
France	French nationality law	Immigration to France		
Germany	German nationality law	Immigration to Germany	There are programs for Continental Refugees and Repatriates but the rules are severely tightened to prevent as little new migrants as possible to benefit from them.	
Greece	Greek nationality law	Immigration to Greece		
Hungary	Hungarian nationality law		All immigration is banned. Foreigners can only be temporary expats.	
Ireland	Irish nationality law	Immigration to Ireland		
Italy	Italian nationality law	Immigration to Italy		
Latvia	Latvian nationality law			
Lithuania	Lithuanian nationality law			
Luxembourg	Luxembourgian nationality law			
Malta	Maltese nationality law	Immigration to Malta		Until 21 September 1964, Maltese persons held British nationality, as Malta was a British Crown colony.
Netherlands	Dutch nationality law	Immigration to the Netherlands	A visa after 5 years of continuous residence and sufficient integration.	
Poland	Polish nationality law			
Portugal	Portuguese nationality law	Immigration to Portugal		
Romania	Romanian nationality law	Immigration to Romania	Special arrangements for citizens of Moldova.	
Slovakia	Slovak nationality law			
Slovenia	Slovenian nationality law	Immigration to Slovenia		
Spain	Spanish nationality law	Immigration to Spain		
Sweden	Swedish nationality law	Immigration to Sweden		
Singapore	Singaporean nationality law	Immigration to Singapore		
Norway	Norwegian nationality law	Immigration to Norway	A minimum of 7 years are required for citizenship. Citizens of other Nordic Council countries may naturalise after a two-year residence.	

== Immigration visa categories by country or territory ==
This section is an attempt to classify and bring together information about immigration legislation on a number of countries with high immigration.

Regular immigration visa categories
Country / territory	Employer-Sponsored Work Visa	Independent Work Visa	Businessperson, Self-employed or Entrepreneur	Investor	Ph.D. or Scientist	Spouse	By birth (foreign national parents)	Studying as a migration route
US	Through H-1B lottery, many applicants failed to receive a settlement after 6 years and had to leave the country.	EB-1 Extraordinary Ability – for internationally recognized scientists, sportsman etc.		EB-5: minimum investment of $800,000.	PhDs are generally allowed to apply for an employer-independent EB2 visa		Automatic citizenship	
United Kingdom	Tier 2 – settlement (ILR) after 5 years. A limit on number of Tier 2 migrants per year coming from outside the country was introduced by new government which makes it more difficult to find an employer willing to sponsor the visa if applying from outside the UK.	Tier 1 General – settlement (ILR) after 5 years. A limit on 1000 Tier 1 migrants per year introduced by new government. Besides that the migration legislation changes on average every six months which makes Britain not attractive for skilled migrants looking for a second nationality. Treaty nationals may enter the UK for self-employment.	Tier 1 Entrepreneur. Treaty nationals may enter the UK to work or provide services.	Tier 1 Investor	There is no specific category here but it is easier for universities (as opposed to businesses) to acquire a Tier 2 sponsorship licence.	ILR is provided after 5 years in marriage or partnership and living in the country.	British citizenship can be obtained as a right for anybody who was born in the UK before 1983. After 1983, it can only be obtained by birth if at least one parent was settled there. It is also available as of right for people of whom one parent is a British citizen otherwise than by descent." All other classes of British Nationality do not confer right of abode in the UK to the holder.	Tier4 Full-time students at university education are allowed to work up to 20 hours a week. Others are allowed to work up to 10 hours per week. After 10 years of continuous presence in the country on residential visas ILR is provided. There is a cap on the duration of staying in the country on a student visa. Treaty nationals may enter the UK for study.
Canada	Temporary Foreign Worker (TFW) (Note: The Electronic Entry Processing (TIE 24 H) system allows nationals from visa-exempt countries to apply online for authorization to engage in professional, artistic, business, or academic activities. This system has replaced the previous requirement of completing white entry forms on aircraft before entering the country. To begin the application process, applicants must access the relevant online platform and subsequently contact their chosen consular representation for further steps.)	Available. The Federal Skilled Trades Program is for skilled workers who want to become permanent residents based on their qualification in a skilled trade. Skilled trades for the Program are organized under these NOC groups: industrial, electrical and construction trades; maintenance and equipment operation trades; supervisors and technical jobs in natural resources, agriculture and related production; processing, manufacturing, and utilities supervisors, and central control operators; chefs and cooks; butchers and bakers	Business people (Note: Defined by the Government of Canada as those who "come to do business under a free trade agreement.") can enter and work in Canada if they qualify under one of the following: Canada–United States–Mexico Agreement (CUSMA); Other Free Trade Agreements (FTAs) (Note: Such as the Canada–Chile FTA, the Canada–Peru FTA, the Canada–Colombia FTA, or the Canada–Korea FTA); General Agreement on Trade in Services (GATS)	To work in Canada as an investor, one must: meet any other rules of CUSMA; have a work permit; and be involved in planning either a) a large amount of trade in goods or services, mainly between Canada and their home country; or b) a large investment in Canada by that person or their company.	Federal Skilled Worker Program.	Eligible persons can sponsor their spouse or partner to become permanent residents, but must be able to: support them financially; and; ensure they don't need social assistance from the government	One does not automatically have Canadian citizenship if they were born outside Canada to Canadian parent(s) on or after 17 April 2009, but neither were born or naturalized in Canada	International students may be able to fall under several categories of permanent residence, including the Canadian Experience Class, the Federal Skilled Worker Program, and the Provincial Nominee Program.
Australia		Available			Skilled Independent visa (Subclass 189)and Skilled Nominated visa (subclass 190)			
New Zealand			Available					
Argentina	Electronic Entry Processing (TIE 24 H)			Not Available		Those overage who got married are exempt of the 2-years requirements for the citizenship.	Everyone who birth in Argentina (Regardless the nationality) are Argentines (except for the children of foreign ministers and members of the Legation residing in the Republic).	Visa for Official Education Students (Art. 7 DNM Provision 2802/2023); And Visa for Non-Official Education Students: Exchange Students, Interns, and Scholars (Arts. 8 to 13 DNM Provision 2802/2023)
South Africa	Corporate worker permit.	General work permit, Quota work permit, exceptional skills work permit and Intra-company transfer work permit.	Business permit. Minimum foreign capital investment ZAR 2,5 Million into book value of business which may be reduced on application. Minimum of 5 South African citizens/residents to be employed.	See Business permit.	No specific category. May fall under Exceptional Skills or Quota work permit.	Spousal visa. Proof of cohabitation and shared finances.	Not applicable. Children born in South Africa to foreign nationals will obtain the same status as their parents.	Study is viewed in isolation in relation to the course of study. No benefits obtained promoting continued stay.
Isle of Man		Similar to British Tier1 General, but does not lead to EU nationality	Similar to British Tier1 Entrepreneur, but does not lead to EU nationality					
South Korea	If you have lived more than 5 years under a D-7, D-8, D-9, E-1, E-2, E-3, E-4, E-5, E-7 or F-2 visa.	If you have internationally recognized extraordinary ability in science, business, culture, sports or education.	If you are over 60 and receive income via pension from overseas.	If you invest $2 million. If you invested only $500,000, you need to stay more than 3 years on a D-8 visa. If you invest $500,000 in real estate of Jeju, Incheon Free Economic Zone, Busan's Haeundae, Pyeongchang or Yeosu, you are given a F-2 residence visa and 5 years later, F-5 permanent residence.	If you have a PhD in a high-tech field and are employed by a Korean firm, earning 4 times the average GNI in Korea. If you only have a bachelor's in a high-tech field or a recognized technical certificate issued in Korea, you need to have stayed for at least 3 years and earn 4 times the average GNI in Korea.	If you have stayed in Korea for more than 2 years under a F-2 visa and are the spouse of a Korean or foreigner with a F-5 permanent residence visa.	If you previously had Korean nationality or either of your parents or grandparents had Korean nationality in the past, you are immediately eligible for a F-4 visa, a practically permanent residence visa that is renewable every 2 years. If you were born to parents who are stateless or were found abandoned within the territory of South Korea as a child, you will automatically get Korean citizenship.	
Hong Kong	General Employment Policy (GEP); will receive Right of Abode (ROA) in Hong Kong, after 7 years continuous ordinary residence in Hong Kong.	General Points Test (GPT); Top Talent Pass Scheme (TTPS)		Capital Investment Entrant Scheme (CIES); you need to invest HK$10 million except on real estate; will receive ROA in Hong Kong, after 7 years continuous ordinary residence in Hong Kong.	Passing GPT within Quality Migrant Admission Scheme (QMAS)		Person under 21 years of age born in Hong Kong of foreigner with HK Permanent ID Card, will receive ROA in Hong Kong, but not Chinese nationality.	
India						A spouse of foreign origin of a citizen of India or spouse of foreign origin of an Overseas Citizen of India holder registered under section 7A of the Citizenship Act 1955 and whose marriage has been registered and subsisted for a continuous period of not less than two years immediately preceding the presentation of the application. A person, who or either of whose parents or grandparents or great grandparents is or had been a citizen of Pakistan or Bangladesh, is ineligible for registration as an Overseas Citizen of India.		
Israel		Not available						
European Union	Varies by member state	Blue Card (European Union)						
Austria		May be available in the future, called Rot-Weiß-Rot-Card						
Cyprus	It is considered to be very unlikely to get nationality through work route	Not available						
Czech Republic		Not available						
Denmark	Available: Danish Green Card							
Finland								
France		Not available						
Germany		Not available						
Hungary								
Ireland		Not available					Available	
Netherlands	Highly-skilled migrant' visa: available only for employers to apply on employee's behalf. Employer must be recognized as a sponsor by IND. Specific salary requirements apply.	Zoekjaar ('search year') visa: a one-year visa available to all students who recently graduated from a university or a college. No other requirements (e.g. sponsor/employer).	A visa is available for self-employed people. Granting of such is determined based on innovative nature of your business, which must be assessed by a certain agency (RVO).				Citizenship or permanent residency can be applied for after 3 years in marriage or partnership with a Dutch national and living in the country.	No provision to grant citizenship based on country of birth is available. At least one parent must be a Dutch national. Prior to January 1, 1985, child's father must have been Dutch for the child to get Dutch citizenship.
Spain	Not available							
Sweden								
Norway						Min 4 years		
Country or Area	Employer Sponsored Work Visa	Independent Work Visa	Businessperson, Self-employed or Entrepreneur	Investor	Ph.D. or Scientist	Spouse	By birth while both of parents are foreign nationals	Studying as a migration route

== General guidelines by country or territory ==
Country / territory	Requirements and restrictions	Employed dependants	Social benefits	Deprivation of nationality	Forgoing other nationalities required for naturalization?	Deprivation of original nationality for those who naturalise in foreign countries?
US		The dependant of a resident visa holder may not work.			No	No, but foreign earnings are liable to taxation.
United Kingdom	Before settlement: No more than 180 days spent overseas within 5 years, no more than 90 days per trip. After settlement: Settlement would be cancelled after a certain number of days spent abroad. A single parent may immigrate if one is the sole supporter.	The dependant of a resident visa holder is allowed to work.	Before settlement: No access to public funds. After settlement: Accessible.	Dual nationals may be deprived of their nationality for engaging in terrorism.	No	No
Canada					No	
Australia						
New Zealand						
Israel					Yes, unless citizenship obtained by Law of Return	
Germany					Yes, unless the prior nationality held was one of the European Union, Norway, or Switzerland; or if the applicant cannot approach the authorities of their previous country for reasons of personal safety.	Yes, unless the nationality acquired is one of the EU, Switzerland, or Norway; or if the applicant obtained permission from the German government prior to submitting an application for naturalisation.
Ukraine						Yes
Norway				Legitimately naturalised persons can be deprived of their nationality.	Yes, unless the applicant cannot approach the authorities of their previous country for reasons of personal safety, or if the authorities demand a fee considered too high.	Yes
Russia					Yes	No
Azerbaijan						Yes
China					Yes	Yes
Denmark						Yes
Japan					Yes	Yes
India						Yes

== See also ==
- Immigration lawyer
- Asylum shopping
- Refugee identity certificate
- Migrant worker
- Immigration country
- Immigration policy
- Impediment to expulsion
- Economic citizenship
- Points-based immigration system
- Immigrant investor programs
