= Free trade agreements of Canada =

Canada's membership in multinational trade pacts

Canada Countries and territories with free trade agreements

The free trade agreements of Canada represents Canada's cooperation in multinational trade pacts and plays a large role in the Canadian economy. Canada is regularly described as a trading nation, considering its total trade is worth more than two-thirds of its GDP (the second highest level in the G7, after Germany). Of that total trade, roughly 75% is done with countries that are part of free trade agreements with Canada—primarily the United States through the Canada–United States–Mexico Agreement (CUSMA), and its predecessor the North American Free Trade Agreement (NAFTA). By the end of 2014, Canada's bilateral trade hit Can$1 trillion for the first time. Canada is a signatory to 15 free trade agreements with 51 countries.

== Overview ==
Canada is a founding member of the World Trade Organization (WTO) since 1 January 1995, having been an original GATT member since 1 January 1948.

The North American Free Trade Agreement (NAFTA), which is held with Canada by the United States and Mexico, came into force on 1 January 1994, creating the largest free trade region in the world by GDP. By 2014, the combined GDP for the NAFTA area was estimated to be over Can$20 trillion with a market encompassing 474 million people.

Building on that success, Canada continues to negotiate and has concluded free trade agreements with 51 countries, most recently with South Korea, which represents Canada's first FTA with a partner in the Asia-Pacific region. As of 2018, Canada has also concluded two other significant multilateral trade agreements: the Comprehensive Economic and Trade Agreement (CETA) with the European Union and the 11-nation Comprehensive and Progressive Agreement for Trans-Pacific Partnership (CPTPP) with 10 other Pacific-Rim countries. On 21 September 2017, CETA was provisionally applied, immediately eliminating 98% of EU's tariff lines on Canadian goods. Canada is currently the only G7 country to have free trade agreements in force with all other G7 countries. Free trade with the final G7 country, Japan, commenced when the CPTPP entered into force on 30 December 2018.

== Free trade agreements ==
=== In force or provisionally in force ===
Current FTAs between Canada and other countries/trading blocs
Agreement name	Abbreviation	Countries/blocs involved	Signed	Entered into force
Canada–United States Free Trade Agreement	CUSFTA	United States	12 October 1987	1 January 1989 (Note: Replaced by the North American Free Trade Agreement.)
North American Free Trade Agreement	NAFTA	Mexico; United States	17 December 1992	1 January 1994 (Note: Replaced by the Canada–United States–Mexico Agreement.)
Canada–Israel Free Trade Agreement	CIFTA	Israel	31 July 1996	1 July 1997
Canada–Chile Free Trade Agreement	CCFTA	Chile	5 December 1996	5 July 1997
Canada–Costa Rica Free Trade Agreement	CCRFTA	Costa Rica	23 April 2001	1 November 2002
Canada–European Free Trade Association Free Trade Agreement	CEFTA	European Free Trade Association	26 January 2008	1 July 2009
Canada–Peru Free Trade Agreement	CPFTA	Peru	29 May 2008	1 August 2009
Canada–Colombia Free Trade Agreement	CCoFTA	Colombia	21 November 2008	15 August 2011 (Note: Canada's ratification of this FTA was dependent upon Colombia's ratification of the "Agreement Concerning Annual Reports on Human Rights and Free Trade Between Canada and the Republic of Colombia" signed on 27 May 2010)
Canada–Jordan Free Trade Agreement	CJFTA	Jordan	28 June 2009	1 October 2012
Canada–Panama Free Trade Agreement	CPAFTA	Panama	14 May 2010	1 April 2013
Canada–Honduras Free Trade Agreement	CHFTA	Honduras	5 November 2013	1 October 2014
Canada–Korea Free Trade Agreement	CKFTA	South Korea	11 March 2014	1 January 2015
Canada–Ukraine Free Trade Agreement	CUFTA	Ukraine	11 July 2016	1 August 2017
Canadian Free Trade Agreement (interprovincial trade agreement)	CFTA	Canada	1 July 2017	1 July 2017
Comprehensive Economic and Trade Agreement	CETA	European Union	30 October 2016	21 September 2017
Comprehensive and Progressive Agreement for Trans-Pacific Partnership	CPTPP, TPP-11	Australia; Brunei; Chile; Japan; Malaysia; Mexico; New Zealand; Peru; Singapore; United Kingdom; Vietnam	8 March 2018	30 December 2018
Canada–United States–Mexico Agreement (Note: The agreement is also referred to as the United States–Mexico–Canada Agreement and abbreviated as the USMCA.)	CUSMA	Mexico; United States	30 November 2018	1 July 2020
Canada–UK Trade Continuity Agreement	Canada–UK TCA	United Kingdom (Note: Trade between Canada and the United Kingdom had formerly benefited from the Canada–EU Comprehensive Economic and Trade Agreement (CETA), although CETA ceased to apply to Canada–UK trade after the UK withdrew from the EU in 2021. The Trade Continuity Agreement largely replicates the provisions of CETA until a more comprehensive trade agreement is agreed upon.)	9 December 2020	1 April 2021

=== Concluded agreements not yet in force ===
- Canada-Indonesia Comprehensive Economic Partnership Agreement (CEPA; signed 24 September 2025)
- Canada-Ecuador Free Trade Agreement (signed 24 July 2026)
- Canada-United Arab Emirates Comprehensive Economic Partnership Agreement (signed 27 October 2026)
- Canada-Philippines Free Trade Agreement (negotiations concluded 13 November 2026)

=== Under active negotiation ===
Canada is negotiating bilateral FTAs with the following countries and trade blocs:

- Mercosur
- Pacific Alliance
- Turkey

=== Negotiations ended with no plan to restart ===
- United Kingdom (Canada–United Kingdom Free Trade Agreement) Negotiations suspended by the UK on 25 January 2024.
- Dominican Republic
- Morocco
- Singapore, abandoned following the commencement of exploratory discussions for a free trade agreement with ASEAN as a whole
- Guatemala, Nicaragua, and El Salvador
- Caribbean Community (CARIBCAN)

=== Exploratory discussions ===
Canada was undertaking exploratory discussions of bilateral or multilateral FTAs with the following countries and trade blocs, although formal negotiations never began:

- China, abandoned following the detention of Michael Spavor and Michael Kovrig and the extradition case of Meng Wanzhou
- Thailand, abandoned following the commencement of exploratory discussions for a free trade agreement with ASEAN as a whole

=== Abandoned free trade agreement proposals ===
Agreement name	Abbreviation	Countries involved	Notes
Free Trade Area of the Americas	FTAA	32: Antigua and Barbuda; Argentina; Bahamas; Barbados; Belize; Bolivia; Brazil; Chile; Colombia; Costa Rica; Dominica; Dominican Republic; Ecuador; El Salvador; Grenada; Guatemala; Guyana; Haiti; Honduras; Jamaica; Mexico; Nicaragua; Panama; Paraguay; Peru; Saint Kitts and Nevis; Saint Lucia; Saint Vincent and the Grenadines; Suriname; Trinidad and Tobago; United States; Uruguay; Venezuela	Proposed expansion of the North American Free Trade Agreement to all members of the Organization of American States, negotiated from 1994 to 2005. During the 4th Summit of the Americas in 2005, 26 of the countries pledged to meet again in 2006 to resume negotiations but no such meeting took place.
Canada–Central American Four Free Trade Agreement	CCA4FTA	Guatemala; El Salvador; Honduras; Nicaragua	Twelve rounds of negotiations from 2001 to 2010. When no agreement was reached during the 2010 round, Canada and Honduras decided to pursue bilateral negotiations and concluded a separate bilateral FTA.
Trans-Pacific Partnership	TPP	Australia; Brunei; Chile; Japan; Malaysia; Mexico; New Zealand; Peru; Singapore; United States; Vietnam	Agreement was signed 4 February 2016. Following the withdrawal of the United States' signature on 23 January 2017 the agreement is defunct, and the remaining members instead concluded the Comprehensive and Progressive Agreement for Trans-Pacific Partnership.

== Foreign Investment Promotion and Protection Agreements ==
A Foreign Investment Promotion and Protection Agreement (FIPA) is an agreement to promote foreign investing.

=== FIPAs in force ===
FIPAs in force, including date of entry into force:

- Canada–Argentina (29 April 1993)
- Canada–Armenia (29 March 1999)
- Canada–Barbados (17 January 1997)
- Canada–Benin (18 January 2013)
- Canada–Burkina Faso (11 October 2017)
- Canada–Cameroon (16 December 2016)
- Canada–China (1 October 2014)
- Canada–Costa Rica (29 September 1999)
- Canada–Côte d'Ivoire (14 December 2015)
- Canada–Croatia (30 January 2001)
- Canada–Czech Republic (22 January 2012)
- Canada–Ecuador (6 June 1997)
- Canada–Egypt (3 November 1997)
- Canada–Guinea (27 March 2017)
- Canada–Hong Kong (6 September 2016)
- Canada–Hungary (21 November 1993)
- Canada–Jordan (14 December 2009)
- Canada–Kosovo (19 December 2018)
- Canada–Kuwait (19 February 2014)
- Canada–Latvia (24 November 2011)
- Canada–Lebanon (19 June 1999)
- Canada–Mali (8 June 2016)
- Canada–Moldova (23 August 2019)
- Canada–Mongolia (24 February 2017)
- Canada–Panama (13 February 1998)
- Canada–Peru (20 June 2007)
- Canada–Philippines (13 November 1996)
- Canada–Poland (22 November 1990)
- Canada–Romania (23 November 2011)
- Canada–Russian Federation (27 June 1991)
- Canada–Senegal (5 August 2016)
- Canada–Serbia (27 April 2015)
- Canada–Slovak Republic (14 March 2012)
- Canada–Tanzania (9 December 2013)
- Canada–Thailand (24 September 2008)
- Canada–Trinidad & Tobago (8 June 1996)
- Canada–Ukraine (24 June 1995)
- Canada-United Arab Emirates (19 May 2026)
- Canada–Uruguay (2 June 1999)
- Canada–Venezuela (28 January 1998)

=== FIPAs signed ===
FIPAs that have been concluded and signed, but have not yet entered into force:

- Canada–Taiwan (December 2023)
- Canada–Nigeria (May 2014)

=== FIPA negotiations concluded ===
FIPA negotiations concluded, not in force nor signed, with date concluded:

- Canada–Albania (November 2013)
- Canada–Bahrain (February 2010)
- Canada–Madagascar (August 2008)
- Canada–Zambia (March 2013)

=== Ongoing FIPA negotiations ===
FIPA negotiations that have not yet concluded:

- Canada–Democratic Republic of Congo
- Canada–Gabon
- Canada–Georgia
- Canada–Ghana
- Canada–India
- Canada–Kazakhstan
- Canada–Kenya
- Canada–Republic of Macedonia
- Canada–Mauritania
- Canada–Mozambique
- Canada–Pakistan
- Canada–Qatar
- Canada–Rwanda
- Canada–Tunisia

== See also ==
- Canada's Global Markets Action Plan
- Economy of Canada
- Free trade agreements of the United Kingdom
