= Canadian mining in Latin America and the Caribbean =

Canadian mining in Latin America and the Caribbean began in the late 20th century. Latin America and the Caribbean's vast resources give the region great geopolitical importance, attracting foreign interest for centuries. The Canadian mining industry is the largest in the world, operating as an important driver for global capital accumulation. Up to 70% of all mining in Latin America involves a Canadian transnational corporation. From the colonial race of European empires, to the multinationals of today's neoliberal capitalist world, this region continues to draw interest. Canada's involvement in Latin America increased dramatically since 1989 with several landmark negotiations and agreements. From 1989 to 2001, of the top 20 mineral exploration investors in Latin America, seven were Canadian companies. By 2009, the Canadian larger-company mineral exploration market in this region was valued at US$1.7 billion.

Currently, Latin America and the Caribbean are dominated by Canadian companies falling from a 49% to 32% held control over the larger-company mineral exploration market after the global recession of 2008. The Canadian share of the market is roughly US$59 million more than the amount domestic companies planned to spend in this region. Both Mexico and Chile have the most intense focus of Canadian mining companies; however, their interest and involvement in other Latin American countries is prevalent.

== History of gold mining in Latin America ==
Canadian mining began in the early 1960s. The establishment of the mine of El Indio in Chile in 1979 ushered a wave of mineral exploration in the Chilean high Andes led by Canadian mining companies in the early 1980s. From 1978 to 1987, the Vancouver exchanges capital trading increased over tenfold, from CAD 600 million to CAD 6.6 billion. Gold mining continued to explode through the 1990s, as Canadian capital industry exploration expenditures covered over 50% of all exploration in Latin America during the 1990s. Headed into the 2000s Canadian companies began to narrow in on precious metal mining, and 86 out of 92 mines in operation are gold, silver, or gold and silver. In pursuit of gold so disseminated that it is invisible, open pit cyanide heap-leach mining became standard practice. In the early 1980s Vancouver was named the heap-leaching capitol of the world. Due to the short life of an open pit mine, 8–15 years, once production began at one mine, another location and project had to already be in development.

Open pit cyanide heap-leach mining was developed in the late 19th century in Scotland. The Bureau of Mines proposed it in 1969 as a method to recover gold from low grade ore. Open pits are created through blasting and crane shovels, with some pit spanning one mile (1.6 km) across and over 1,000 feet (300 m) deep. Ore is piled into heaps and cyanide solution is sprayed over the heap, trickling down through the ore and bonding with precious metals. The solution is then stripped for the precious mineral, and the process repeats. Cyanide is a compound composed of carbon and nitrogen, and while extremely efficient, creates large quantities of waste and is extremely toxic. A teaspoon of a 2% cyanide solution can kill a human.

== Negotiations and agreements in Latin America ==
=== Central America and the Caribbean ===
==== Free Trade Agreements (FTAs) ====
- Canada-Panama Free Trade Agreement Signed: 14 May 2010; In effect: 1 April 2013. This agreement eliminated 90% goods from Canada to be tariffed into Panama and ends the ban on beef from Canada, with the remaining 10% being phased out over ten years. Canada removes 99% of tariffs on goods from Panama, besides sugar, eggs, dairy, and poultry.
- Canada – Costa Rica Free Trade Agreement Signed: 23 April 2001. In effect: 1 November 2002. 87% of all tariffs on agricultural products (with the exception of dairy, poultry, beef, and eggs) removed over a 7-14 year period or immediately, as well as on automotive and some goods.

==== Ongoing FTA negotiations ====
- Canada – Caribbean Community Free Trade Negotiations (CARICOM)
- Canada – Central America Four (CA4)
- Canada – Dominican Republic Free Trade Agreement Negotiations
- Canada – Honduras Free Trade Negotiations
- Free Trade Area of the Americas (FTAA)
- Negotiations to Modernize the Canada-Costa Rica Free Trade Agreement

==== Foreign Investment Promotion and Protection (FIPAs) ====
- Canada – Costa Rica Foreign Investment Promotion and Protection (FIPA) Date: 29 September 1999
- Canada – El Salvador Foreign Investment Promotion and Protection (FIPA) Date: 31 May 1999
- Canada – Panama Foreign Investment Promotion and Protection (FIPA) Date: 13 February 1998
- Canada – Barbados Foreign Investment Promotion and Protection (FIPA) Date: 17 January 1997
- Canada – Trinidad and Tobago Foreign Investment Promotion and Protection (FIPA) Date: 8 July 1996

==== Other types of agreements and initiatives ====
- Central America Memorandum of Understanding on Trade and Investment (MOUTI) Date: 18 March 1998

=== South America (with Andean Community) ===
==== Free Trade Agreements (FTAs) ====
- Canada – Colombia Free Trade Agreement Date: 15 August 2011
- Canada – Peru Free Trade Agreement Date: 1 August 2009
- Canada – Chile Free Trade Agreement Date: 5 July 1997

==== Ongoing FTA negotiations ====
- Canada – Andean Community Countries Free Trade Discussions
- Free Trade Area of the Americas (FTAA)

==== Foreign Investment Promotion and Protection (FIPAs) ====
- Canada – Peru Foreign Investment Promotion and Protection (FIPA) Date: 20 June 2007
- Canada – Uruguay Foreign Investment Promotion and Protection (FIPA) Date: 2 June 1999
- Canada – Venezuela Foreign Investment Promotion and Protection (FIPA) Date: 28 January 1998
- Canada – Ecuador Foreign Investment Promotion and Protection (FIPA) Date: 6 June 1997
- Canada – Argentina Foreign Investment Promotion and Protection (FIPA) Date: 29 April 1993

==== Other types of agreements and initiatives ====
- Andean Community Trade and Investment Cooperation Arrangement (TICA) Date: 31 May 1999
- Southern Cone Common Market (MERCOSUR) Trade and Investment Cooperation Arrangements (TICA) Date: 16 June 1998

== Neo-liberal capitalism ==
The Canadian governments involvement and the penetration of Canadian capital in the region reflected the neoliberal movement of the 1980s and 1990s. Much of the Latin American economy was dominated by World Bank and IMF forced policies during the debt crisis of the early 1980s. The late 1990s began a shift in political thought in the region moving towards support for more populist, left and centre-left governments, particularly by peasants. Mercosur, an economic agreement between Argentina, Brazil, Paraguay and Uruguay along with associate members Chile and Bolivia in 1994 want to improve development through protecting the free movement of goods between these countries. Socially, there was a demand to reclaim sovereignty over the natural resources privatized within Latin America. The goal became to restore the profitability of these natural resources by restructuring capital and trade relations.

Such policies as establishing a common external tariff and a common trade policy promote an infant industry argument. The relaunching of Mercosur in the mid-2000s can be seen as a new form of regionalist governance in the Southern Cone. Canada has become at the centre of this conflict and has received much criticism by anti-imperialist struggles protesting for local control over privatized natural resources.

== Foreign aid policy shift ==
Recently, with the Conservative government of Canada, a dramatic shift in foreign aid has occurred towards middle-income countries in Latin America, causing the abandonment of many projects in Africa. Once again, the Conservative government has come under scrutiny for its Foreign Aid Policy as the Canadian International Development Agency has established foreign-aid pilot projects in South America with large mining corporations, to foster economic growth and international trade in Canada. Since the Conservatives came to power in 2006, over $50 million in projects have been approved and many more are under way. NGOs and mining industry critics have been accusing the Conservative government for subsidizing phony "corporate social responsibility" projects that are led by profitable companies with bad intentions. Jamie Kneen of MiningWatch Canada said that "the government is helping the mining industry to put a positive spin on their operations, despite their negative environmental and human-rights records". In contrast, the president of the Canadian Mining Association Pierre Gratton believes "these projects help improve the image of the industry ... because they are meaningful and have value. This is not just PR."

== Cultural, health and environmental concerns ==
=== Cultural concerns ===
The expansion of Canadian mining companies in Latin America and the Caribbean during the 1990s was never paralleled with official Canadian legislation on standards abroad, which has caused much debate on socio-economic change and conflict to numerous rural and indigenous communities. Social conflict breeds the risk of violence, and over 40% of conflicts in Peru stem from environmental contentions, with the most violent being related to transnational extractive processes of resources like gold. Increased social disorganization with violent protests, criminal activities and even deaths and group rape have been suspected to be caused by the involvement of some Canadian mining companies. Increased assassinations of activists have shown the political conflicts and related corruption as divisions between anti and pro-mining groups escalate.

Violence is used by local communities as a way of protest against the actions of the mine. Once a mining project receives its licensure, they are able to explore remote areas and communities, and oftentimes authorities in the region and local communities are not giving the government support to negotiate with these corporations or preserve their own livelihoods. Foreign investment in mining is a continually increasing in form of conflict within indigenous and impoverished communities, who are often the groups affected by extractive processes.

Traditional production methods are often destroyed, and in regions such as Chile, areas with mining activities have the greatest unemployment and poverty rates in the country. Colombian gold mining trends show that when there is an increase in jobs available to the local community, there are higher rates of child labor and lower rates of school attendance. This is an example of an important concept of extractive industries; the curse of natural resources. This concept is an economic construct that postulates that countries rich in oil or minerals are doomed to poor economic environments. Some suggest that resources also innately hinder standards of living and economic performance. Resource extraction creates a trade balance incredibly dependent on the exportation of goods, so the entire economy and livelihood of the country is at the hands of international valuation of the resource. Oftentimes during resource booms, like in the case of Colombia, the economic gain is allocated to expand domestic consumption. Little of the financial gain is used for investment into public interest and infrastructures that prioritize social needs of the country.

One study looks at an open pit mine in Yancocha, Peru, through a shift in policy that required the mine to increase local employees. The increase in jobs for Yanchoca correlated to an increase in price of living, housing, and food. Further, the effects of the increased jobs didn't reach so close as neighboring communities economically. The instability of government aspires from the impact of resource booms on government, social conflict, and corruption. Gold is a fixed resource, which discourages people from employing time and money towards their, or their children's, education, because there is a clock on the resources. In countries rich in resources, there is often a decline in other industry sectors such as agriculture and manufacturing, which places countries at a development disadvantage. Mining in comparison to other industry sectors does not require as many employees; it carries a relatively low labor demand.

=== Environmental concerns ===
Water quality and quantity is the largest concern of local communities. Gold mining requires the use of chemicals that are often dispelled into surrounding water as wastewater discharge without any treatment. Mercury, cyanide, nitric acid, zinc, and cadmium are all found in the water surrounding mines. Mining can have adverse effects on non-mineral production, such as agriculture when Canadian mining production leads to soil erosion, such as the case in La Libertad, Colombia. There is reported destabilization within both the migratory and mating patterns of animal species within these geographies due to infrastructure development. There is also the threat of water source sedimentation, land cover degradation, deforestation, and soil degradation.

=== Health concerns ===
In addition, reports of the spills of harmful chemicals, such as cyanide in local water supplies has increased deaths of livestock and skin disorders and infection among children. In the face of resource extraction within Latin America, children are being exposed to higher rates of urban air pollution, pesticides, heavy metals, toxic synthetic chemicals, and hazardous electronic waste. These modern environmental threats are often linked to the development of chronic diseases in children in the region; asthma, neurodevelopmental delays and disorders, mental health concerns, cardiovascular diseases, pediatric cancer, obesity and diabetes.

== Canadian companies ==
=== Ascendant Copper ===
==== Involvement in Ecuador ====
- Protests over the Junín mining project

=== Barrick Gold ===
Toronto-based Barrick Gold Corp, the largest gold producer in the world, has been critiqued by NGOs such as the MiningWatch Canada, Greenpeace, and Amnesty International for their environmental degradation and economic and social impacts in Ancash, Condorhuain, Chilecito, Famatina, and Pascua-Lama.

==== Involvement in Argentina and Chile ====
(see Greenpeace Protests)

Since Barrick Gold Corp acquired the Pascua Lama open-pit mine site in 1994 which crosses the borders of Argentina and Chile, environmental concerns such as water pollution and glacier relocation. Protesters carrying sign such as "Harper Go Home!" were displayed upon Prime Minister Stephen Harper's visit in July 2007 and show the growing negative opinion of Canadian relations by Latin Americans.

=== Conquistador Mines Ltd ===
==== Involvement in Colombia ====
- Bolivar community protests and conflict

=== Colombia Goldfields and B2Gold ===
==== Involvement in Colombia ====
- Caldas and Antioquia community protests

=== Da Capo Resources (today Vista Gold Corporation) ===
- Bolivia – Masacre de Navidad Bolivian mines of Amayapamp and Capasirca 1996

=== Goldcorp Inc. ===
==== Involvement in Guatemala ====
The indigenous communities of Guatemala have been rife in protest due to the activities of Goldcorp. In a particular case the Maya-Mam in San Miguel Ixtahuacán have experienced an increase in violence, particularly during an event where the government unleashed security forces killing one man and seriously wounding 16 people. Environmental problems such as deforestation through the clear cutting of 20 square km of forest, the contamination of ground and surface water with the excessive use of cyanide and the extensive draining of water. The contamination of water with arsenic, magnesium, cyanide cooper and iron in San Marcos exceeds the already low regulations on water quality in Guatemala. Damage to the structure of homes is increasingly common due to dynamite explosions. Increased skin and respiratory diseases are also a major issue. The Guatemala government suspended operations of the Canadian Goldcorp's Marlin Mine after the demands of the 18 Maya Indigenous communities affected by the environmental degradation of land. Reports from the Latin American Water Tribunal, the International Labour Organization, the Physicians for Human Rights and the University of Michigan have all negative reports on the mining site, which have been dismissed by Goldcorp and the Canadian government.

==== Involvement in Honduras ====
Findings of dangerously high levels of heavy metal poisoning in the blood of children and adults according to World Health Organization and CDC standards in the Siria Valley due to open-pit, cyanide leaching. In 2008 Goldcorp halted operations at the San Martin mine. Canadian government and business such as Aura Minerals still cooperate with the Honduran regime with further investments in corrupt mining practices and low-paid sweatshop industry. Reports of death squad killings in Honduras due to mining activities in general have also occurred.

=== Greystar Resources ===
==== Colombia ====
- Santander community protests and conflict

=== HudBay Minerals Inc. ===
==== Involvement in Guatemala ====
Lawsuits against the company have been launched by a group of 11 women from Guatemala with allegations of gang-rape by security personnel, members of the police and military in 2007 after an attempt to clear people from lands near a mining project. In addition a lawsuit for the murder of a man by private security guards hired by HudBays Guatemalan subsidiary company in 2009 was also put forth in Ontario courts. The brutal murder of an indigenous rural worker and the resulting wounding of seven others by a subsidiary of HudBay Minerals Inc. occurred in 2009 after locals gathered to protest a forced eviction were reported by Amnesty International and other Human rights groups.

=== Manhattan Minerals Corp ===
==== Peru ====
- Tambogrande community protests

=== Metallica Resources Inc ===
==== Mexico ====
- community of Cerro de San Pedro protests

=== Skye Resources ===
==== Guatemala ====
- Mayan K'iche' peasants protests

=== South American Silver Corporation ===
==== Bolivia ====
On 11 July 2012, Bolivian president Evo Morales revoked SASC's mining permit by presidential decree.

== Bill C-300 ==
The Corporate Accountability of Mining, Oil and Gas Corporations in Developing Countries Act, also known as Bill C-300, was defeated in a vote of 140 to 134 in the House of Commons of Canada in October 2010. The Summary of the bill states:

The purpose of this enactment is to promote environmental best practices and to ensure the protection and promotion of international human rights standards in respect of the mining, oil or gas activities of Canadian corporations in developing countries. It also gives the Minister of Foreign Affairs and Minister of International Trade the responsibility to issue guidelines that articulate corporate accountability standards for mining, oil or gas activities and it requires the Ministers to submit an annual report to both Houses of Parliament on the provisions and operation of this Act."

Mining companies were extremely opposed to the legislation and believed the bill would cost jobs. For example, a mining executive complained that the bill assumed "Canadian mining companies are bad corporate citizens". He insisted that this "could not be further from the truth". An article written by faculty of law professors from both the University of Toronto and Ottawa in the Canadian Globe and Mail argued if standards are being met then the extreme opposition towards Bill C-311 should not have occurred by mining companies.

== Greenpeace protests ==
In March 2011, Greenpeace Argentina led a campaign against Canadian mining giant Barrick Gold in its attempts to block the application of a new law to protect glaciers passed by parliament in Argentina. The law prohibits any poor environmental standards which would damage and contaminate glaciers.

== Accumulation by dispossession ==
David Harvey's idea of accumulation by dispossession is a framework used by some sociologists, economists, and geographers to understand the activities of Canadian mining companies in Latin America. This idea views that western countries use neoliberal capitalist policies to ensure their wealth and influence by dispossessing the public of their wealth or land. This concept sees the constant need to pursue accumulation of wealth to ensure the current economic model as harmful to the environment and societies. A caveat of this form of neoextractivism is the process by which accumulation occurs cannot be distinguished from the inevitable reorganization of the lives of peoples within the community, through means of force and violence.

== See also ==
- Canadian Mining in the Democratic Republic of the Congo
- Mining Companies of Canada
