= Residence in English law =

Residence in English law may refer to:

- Family law, an area of the law that deals with family-related matters and domestic relations
- Immigration law, refers to national government policies which control the phenomenon of immigration to their country
- Taxation law
