= Canada–India Free Trade Agreement =

Free trade agreement

The Canada–India Free Trade Agreement was a free trade agreement which was at negotiation level, between Canada and India. The Canada-India Free Trade Agreement would include, among other things, high-level commitments on goods, services, investment, rules of origin, sanitary and phytosanitary measures, technical barriers to trade, and dispute settlement. As part of the Canada-India Free Trade Agreement, an interim trade agreement could also be referred to as an Early Progress Trade Agreement (EPTA). As of 2021, the Canada-India Free Trade Agreement has been superseded by negotiations towards a Comprehensive Economic Partnership (CEPA) and the free trade agreement was suspended.

== Relaunch of CEPA negotiations ==
After several years of stalled progress, India and Canada relaunched Comprehensive Economic Partnership Agreement (CEPA) negotiations in late 2025. On 23 November 2025, the Indian Prime Minister and Canadian Prime Minister Mark Carney met at the G‑20 Leaders' Summit in Johannesburg and agreed to target doubling bilateral trade to US$50 billion by 2030.

In May 2026, Canadian International Trade Minister Maninder Sidhu hosted India's Minister of Commerce and Industry Piyush Goyal with the largest‑ever Indian trade delegation to Canada. Two rounds of CEPA negotiations had been completed by May 2026, with a third round to be hosted by Canada. The ministers committed to concluding CEPA by the end of 2026 and to doubling two‑way trade to $70 billion annually by 2030.

== See also ==
- Canada–India relations
- Canada's Global Markets Action Plan
- Economy of Canada
- Free trade agreements of Canada
- Free trade agreements of India
- India–United Kingdom Comprehensive Economic and Trade Agreement
