= CanadExport =

Canadian government publication

CanadExport is a Canadian government publication and the official bulletin of the Canadian Trade Commissioner Service (TCS)—a core operation of Canada's Federal Department of Foreign Affairs and International Trade. Based in Ottawa and published online bi-weekly in both English and French, CanadExport is a source of trade-related news, events, advice, and opportunities for Canadian businesses interested in the international market.

The TCS assists Canadian businesses who are ready to expand their business internationally by preparing them for international markets and assessing potential markets, as well as providing qualified business contacts and advice on international trade policy and regulations.

Michael Mancini is the editor-in-chief of the publication, with Yen Le as coordinator.

== History ==
Published in both English and French, CanadExport was founded in 1983 by what was then known as the Department of External Affairs and International Trade. Originally, the publication was printed and distributed twice monthly free of charge to some 50,000 Canadian subscribers.

=== Online publication ===
In 1996, the CanadExport website was created to allow for online content and in 2007 became a 100% online publication. Now as the official e-Magazine of the Canadian Trade Commissioner Service (TCS), it is delivered electronically to over 17,000 Canadian subscribers.

In keeping with the online revolution, the e-Magazine has made changes to its format with the introduction of podcasts, videocasts, and webinars, that feature international business trends and opportunities for Canadian businesses. These productions include interviews with key business and government leaders who have amassed expertise in how to succeed internationally and how to avoid costly mistakes.

== Partner publications ==
The Government of Canada has also partnered with non-governmental publications related to Canadian exports:

- ExportWise: "intelligence and commentary from the trade community."
- TradeInsights: "articles, guides and reports on the latest market trends to help [readers] grow [their] business outside of Canada."
- BDC publications: "recent developments and trends for small and medium-sized enterprises."
- TradeReady: "the latest industry information and access to a community of export professionals around the world."
