= Defence Liaison Two =

The Defence Liaison Two (DL2) Division was a post World War II intelligence unit of Canada's Department of External Affairs (DEA).

As part of a reorganization initiative led by Under-Secretary of State for External Affairs Arnold Heeney, the DEA established the Defence Liaison Division in November 1948 to handle military aspects of foreign policy in collaboration with the Department of National Defence. By 1950, this division was split, and the security and intelligence responsibilities were assigned to the newly formed DL2 division.
