= Canada–Honduras Free Trade Agreement =

- Signed: 5 November 2013
- Effective: 1 October 2014
- Parties: Canada; Honduras

The Canada–Honduras Free Trade Agreement is a free trade agreement between Canada and Honduras which entered into force on 1 October 2014. From 2000-2010, Canada was in multilateral negotiations with Honduras, Guatemala, El Salvador, and Nicaragua (collectively the Central American Four or CA4) on a proposed Canada–Central American Four Free Trade Agreement. When no agreement was reached between Canada and the CA4 after twelve rounds of negotiation, Canada and Honduras began separate bilateral negotiations in 2010.

Canadian Prime Minister Stephen Harper's visit to the city of San Pedro Sula to sign the ceremonial initial agreement in 2011 was the first time a foreign leader had visited Honduras since the 2009 coup d'état. Harper was criticized for engaging in negotiations with the government of Honduran President Pepe Lobo, with observers in Canada saying the country under Lobo is "an impoverished quasi-dictatorship" and criticizing Canada's lack of response to human rights concerns in the country.

The final agreement was signed by the trade ministers of both countries, along with side cooperation agreements on environmental protection and labour rights, on 5 November 2013.

== See also ==
- Canada–Costa Rica Free Trade Agreement
- Dominican Republic–Central America Free Trade Agreement
