= Investment policy =

Type of government regulation or law

Within public finance, an investment policy is any government regulation or law that encourages or discourages foreign investment in the local economy, e.g. currency exchange limits.

== Explanation ==
As globalization integrates the economies of neighboring and of trading states, they are typically forced to trade off such rules as part of a common tax, tariff and trade regime, e.g. as defined by a free trade pact. Investment policy favoring local investors over global ones is typically discouraged in such pacts, and the idea of a separate investment policy rapidly becomes a fiction or fantasy, as real decisions reflect the real need for nations to compete for investment, even from their own local investors.

A strong and centralized system of the new global rules, made by many in the anti-globalization movement, is that guarantees are often available to foreign investors that are not available to local small investors, and that capital flight is encouraged by such free trade pacts.

== Policy drivers ==
Investment policy in many nations is tied to immigration policy, either due to a desire to prevent human capital flight by forcing investors to keep local assets in local investments, or by a desire to attract immigrants by offering passports in a safe haven nation, e.g. Canada, in exchange for a substantial investment in a business that will create jobs there. A frequent criticism of such joint immigration-investment policy is that they encourage organized crime by providing incentive for money-laundering and safe places for "bosses" to move to when the heat rises in their home country.

== See also ==
- Investment Policy Framework for Sustainable Investment
- Foreign direct investment
- Globalization
- Immigration policy
- Tax, tariff and trade
