= Dominican Republic–Central America Free Trade Agreement =

Free trade agreement

The Dominican Republic–Central America–United States Free Trade Agreement
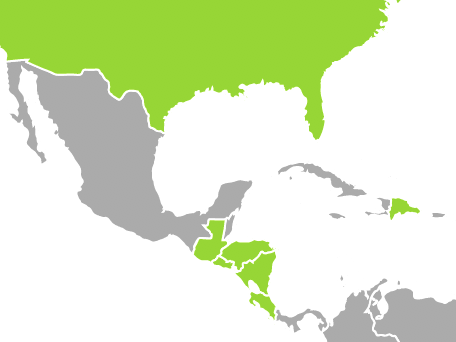
- Type: Free trade agreement
- Signed: August 5, 2004
- Location: Washington, D.C.
- Effective: 1 March 2006
- Ratifiers: Costa Rica; Dominican Republic; El Salvador; Guatemala; Honduras; Nicaragua; United States
- Depositary: General Secretariat of the Organization of American States
- Languages: English; Spanish

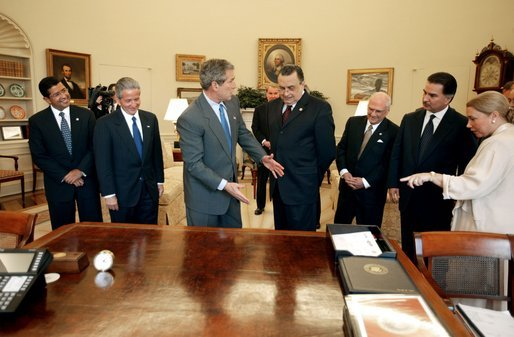
Presidents Francisco Flores Pérez, Ricardo Maduro, George W. Bush, Abel Pacheco, Enrique Bolaños and Alfonso Portillo

The Dominican Republic–Central America–United States Free Trade Agreement (CAFTA-DR or DR-CAFTA; Spanish: Tratado de Libre Comercio entre República Dominicana, Centroamérica y Estados Unidos de América, TLC) is a free trade agreement (legally a treaty under international law). Originally, the agreement encompassed the United States and the Central American countries of Costa Rica, El Salvador, Guatemala, Honduras, and Nicaragua, and was called CAFTA. In 2004, the Dominican Republic joined the negotiations, and the agreement was renamed CAFTA-DR.

CAFTA-DR, the United States-Mexico-Canada Agreement (USMCA), and active bilateral free trade agreements such as the Canada-Costa Rica Free Trade Agreement are seen as bloc agreements instead of a Free Trade Area of the Americas (FTAA) agreement. Panama has completed negotiations with the United States for a bilateral free trade agreement known as the Panama–U.S. Trade Promotion Agreement, and has been in effect since October 2012.

The CAFTA-DR constitutes the first free trade agreement between the United States and a small group of developing countries. It was created with the purpose of creating new and better economic opportunities by opening markets, eliminating tariffs, reducing barriers to services, and more. In 2015, it was estimated that the total two-way trade resulted in $53 billion (~$68.3 billion in 2024). Nearly all Central American exports to the United States had already been tariff-free thanks to the 1984 Caribbean Basin Initiative.

== Ratification ==
The agreement is a treaty under international law, but not under the U.S. Constitution because in the United States laws require majority approval in both houses, while treaties require two-thirds approval in the Senate only. Under U.S. law, CAFTA-DR is a congressional-executive agreement.

The U.S. Senate approved the CAFTA-DR on June 30, 2005, by a vote of 54–45, and the U.S. House of Representatives approved the pact on July 28, 2005, by a vote of 217–215, with two representatives not voting. Controversy arose over this vote because it was held open 1 hour and 45 minutes longer than the normal 15 minutes in order to get some members to change their votes. For procedural reasons, the Senate took a second vote on CAFTA on July 28 and the pact garnered an additional vote from Senator Joe Lieberman—who had been absent on June 30—in favor of the agreement. The implementing legislation became Public Law 109-053 when it was signed by President George W. Bush on August 2, 2005.

The Dominican Republic, Costa Rica, El Salvador, Guatemala, Nicaragua, and Honduras have also approved the agreement. They are all the current members of CAFTA-DR.

El Salvador became the first country to formally implement CAFTA, which went into effect on March 1, 2006, when the Organization of American States (OAS) received signed copies of the treaty. On April 1, 2006, Honduras and Nicaragua fully implemented the agreement. On May 18, 2006, the Congress of Guatemala ratified CAFTA-DR, which went into effect on July 1, 2006. The Dominican Republic implemented the agreement on March 1, 2007. In a referendum on October 7, 2007, Costa Rica narrowly backed the free trade agreement, with 51.6% voting "Yes"; the agreement took effect on January 1, 2009.

== Aims ==
The goal of the agreement is the creation of a free trade area similar to NAFTA, which currently encompasses the United States, Canada, and Mexico. CAFTA-DR is also seen as a stepping stone towards the FTAA, another (more ambitious) free trade agreement that would encompass all the South American and Caribbean nations as well as those of North and Central America except Cuba. Canada is negotiating a similar treaty called the Canada–Central American Four Free Trade Agreement.

Once passed by the countries involved, tariffs on about 80% of U.S. exports to the participating countries were eliminated immediately and the rest were phased out over the subsequent decade. As a result, CAFTA-DR does not require substantial reductions in U.S. import duties with respect to the other countries, as the vast majority of goods produced in the participating countries already entered the United States duty-free due to the U.S. government's Caribbean Basin Initiative.

With the addition of the Dominican Republic, the trade group's largest economy, the region covered by CAFTA-DR is the second-largest Latin American export market for U.S. producers, behind only Mexico, buying $29 billion (~$37.4 billion in 2024) of goods in 2015. Two-way trade amounted to about $50 billion in the same year.

While not necessarily a part of Plan Puebla Panama, CAFTA is a necessary precursor to the execution of Plan Puebla Panama by the Inter-American Development Bank. The plan includes construction of highways linking Panama City to Mexico City, Texas, and the rest of the United States.

CAFTA-DR reduces tariffs, but every CAFTA country sets its overall tax level.

== Support ==
In January 2002 U.S. president George W. Bush declared CAFTA as a priority and received "fast track" authority from Congress to negotiate it. Negotiations began in January 2003, and agreement was reached with El Salvador, Guatemala, Honduras, and Nicaragua on December 17, 2003, and with Costa Rica on January 25, 2004. That same month, negotiations began with the Dominican Republic to join CAFTA.

On May 28, 2004, U.S. trade representative Robert Zoellick, Costa Rican minister of trade Alberto Trejos, Salvadoran economy minister Miguel Lacayo, Guatemalan economy minister Marcio Cuevas, Honduran minister of industry and commerce Norman García, and Nicaraguan minister of development, industry and commerce Mario Arana signed the 2,400-page document at headquarters of the Organization of American States. Negotiations with the Dominican Republic concluded on March 15, 2004, and a second signing ceremony including Dominican minister of industry and commerce Sonia Guzmán was held on August 5, 2004.

== Opposition ==
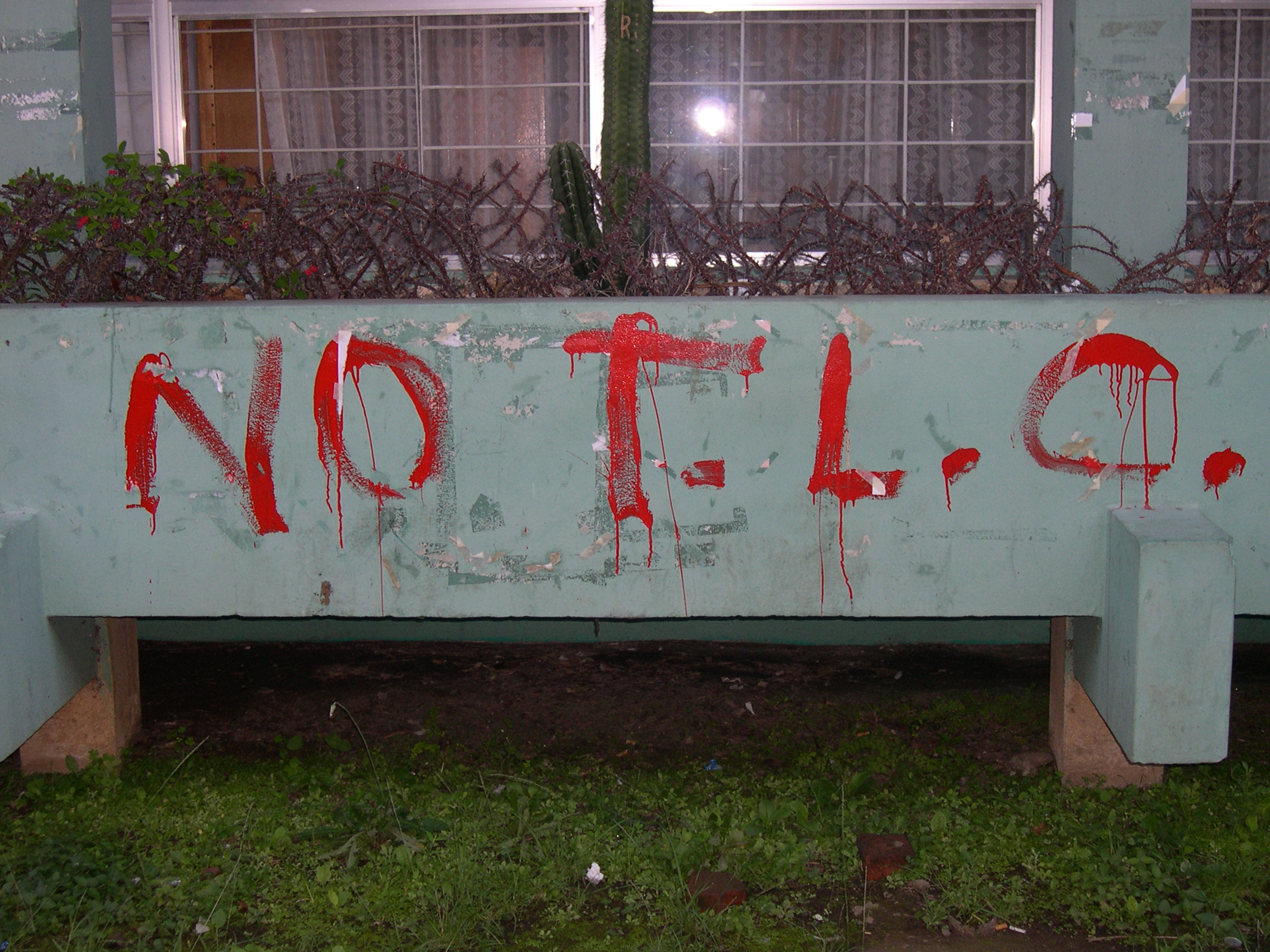
Anti-CAFTA graffiti in San José, Costa Rica

In May 2004, the Salvadoran American National Network, the largest national association of Central American community-based organizations in the United States, expressed opposition to CAFTA, which they claimed was not ideologically motivated: "As immigrants, we have a deep understanding of the potential benefits of improved transnational cooperation. We would welcome an agreement that would increase economic opportunity, protect our shared environment, guarantee workers' rights and acknowledge the role of human mobility in deepening the already profound ties between our countries. However, the CAFTA agreement falls far short of that vision."

While manufacturing costs of generic drugs are relatively cheap, the costs of human tests are relatively expensive, and tests take months or years. If generic manufacturers had to redo the tests, the generic drug would be more expensive, and generic manufacturers might not be able to do the tests at all. Furthermore, if generic manufacturers had to redo the tests, they would have to compare the new, effective drugs to less-effective drugs, which according to Doctors Without Borders, would be unethical. In the United States, drug manufacturers must make test data public for generic manufacturers. Under CAFTA's test data exclusivity, drug manufacturers could keep test data secret, which would make it more difficult for local companies to produce generic drugs, and enable multinational pharmaceutical companies to keep a monopoly on branded drugs, including those used to treat AIDS, malaria, and tuberculosis.

In Guatemala there were protests and strikes occurred in Costa Rica in opposition to the trade agreement. Furthermore, many Catholic bishops in Central America and the United States opposed the treaty, just as many social movements in the region.

== Provisions ==
To create an FTA, governments pledge to grant market access to foreign firms by reducing and eventually eliminating tariffs and other measures that protect domestic products. To do so, the CAFTA-DR treaty stipulates national treatment and includes a most-favored nation clause. It also includes the protection of international property rights and requires from their signatories certain measures in the realm of transparency (e.g., parties are obligated to criminalize bribery in matters affecting international trade or investment). Moreover, the agreement includes i.a. chapters on investment, public procurement procedures, and financial services.

Antidumping and countervailing duty measures may not be challenged.

=== Cross-border trade in services ===
Each member country must treat service suppliers of another member country no less favorably than its own suppliers or those of any other member country. It requires firms to establish a local presence as a condition for supplying a service on a cross-border basis.

=== Financial services ===
CAFTA-DR imposes rules requiring member countries to treat service suppliers of another member country no less favorably than its own suppliers or those of any other country, prohibits certain quantitative restrictions on market access of financial institutions, and bars restrictions on the nationality of senior management.

=== Investment ===
CAFTA-DR establishes rules to protect investors from one member country against unfair or discriminatory government actions when they make or attempt to make investments in another member country's territory. Investors enjoy six basic protections:

1. Non-discriminatory treatment relative to domestic investors as well as investors of non-parties;
2. Limits on "performance requirements";
3. Free transfer of funds related to an investment;
4. Protection from expropriation other than in conformity with customary international law;
5. A "minimum standard of treatment" in conformity with customary international law;
6. The ability to hire key managerial personnel without regard to nationality.

=== Government procurement ===
Each member country must apply fair and transparent procurement procedures and rules and prohibiting each government and its procuring entities from discriminating in purchasing practices against goods, services, and suppliers from the other member countries.

=== Agriculture ===
CAFTA-DR requires that tariffs and quotas be administered in a manner that is transparent, nondiscriminatory, responsive to market conditions and minimally burdensome on trade and allows importers to fully utilize import quotas. Each member country will eliminate export subsidies on agricultural goods destined for another CAFTA-DR country.

=== Intellectual property rights ===
Member countries must ratify or accede to treaties governing intellectual property rights, such as the WIPO Copyright Treaty.

Each member country must provide:

- Protection for marks and geographical indications, including protecting preexisting trademarks against infringement by later geographical indications.
- Efficient and transparent procedures governing the application for protection of marks and geographical indications.
- Copyright protection for the life of the author plus 70 years (for works measured by a person's life), or 70 years (for corporate works).

It also includes provisions on anticircumvention, under which member countries commit to prohibit tampering with digital rights management technology. Member countries agree to make patents available for any invention, subject to limited exclusions, and confirm the availability of patents for new uses or methods of using a known product. To guard against arbitrary revocation of patents, the grounds for revoking a patent must meet the high standard of not having merited the patent in the first place.

CAFTA-DR also ensures test data exclusivity for pharmaceutical corporations. It protects test data that a company submits in seeking marketing approval for such products by precluding other firms from relying on the data.

=== Dispute resolution ===
If a dispute over an actual or proposed national rule cannot be resolved after a 30-day consultation, the matter may be referred to a panel comprising independent experts that the parties select. Once the procedure before the panel is concluded, the panel will issue a report. The parties will attempt to resolve the dispute based on the panel's report. If no amicable resolution is possible, the complaining party may suspend trade benefits equivalent in effect to those it considers were impaired, or may be impaired, as a result of the disputed measure. If a dispute arises under both CAFTA-DR and the WTO Agreement, the complaining party may choose either forum.

=== Political standards ===
CAFTA-DR contains certain provisions that do not have the quality of mere technical liberalization, but are rather a commitment to political standards. The treaty obligates governments to the enforcement of environmental laws and improvement of the environment. CAFTA-DR Environmental Cooperation Agreement, signed in concert with the FTA, provides for environmental cooperation on issues of mutual environmental concern. Furthermore, CAFTA-DR contains provisions for the enforcement of the International Labour Organization's core labor standards.

== See also ==
- General Agreement on Tariffs and Trade (GATT)
- List of free trade agreements
- World Trade Organization (WTO)
- OceanaGold - unsuccessful attempt to invoke CAFTA-DR against El Salvador
- Rules of origin
