= Canada–Peru relations =

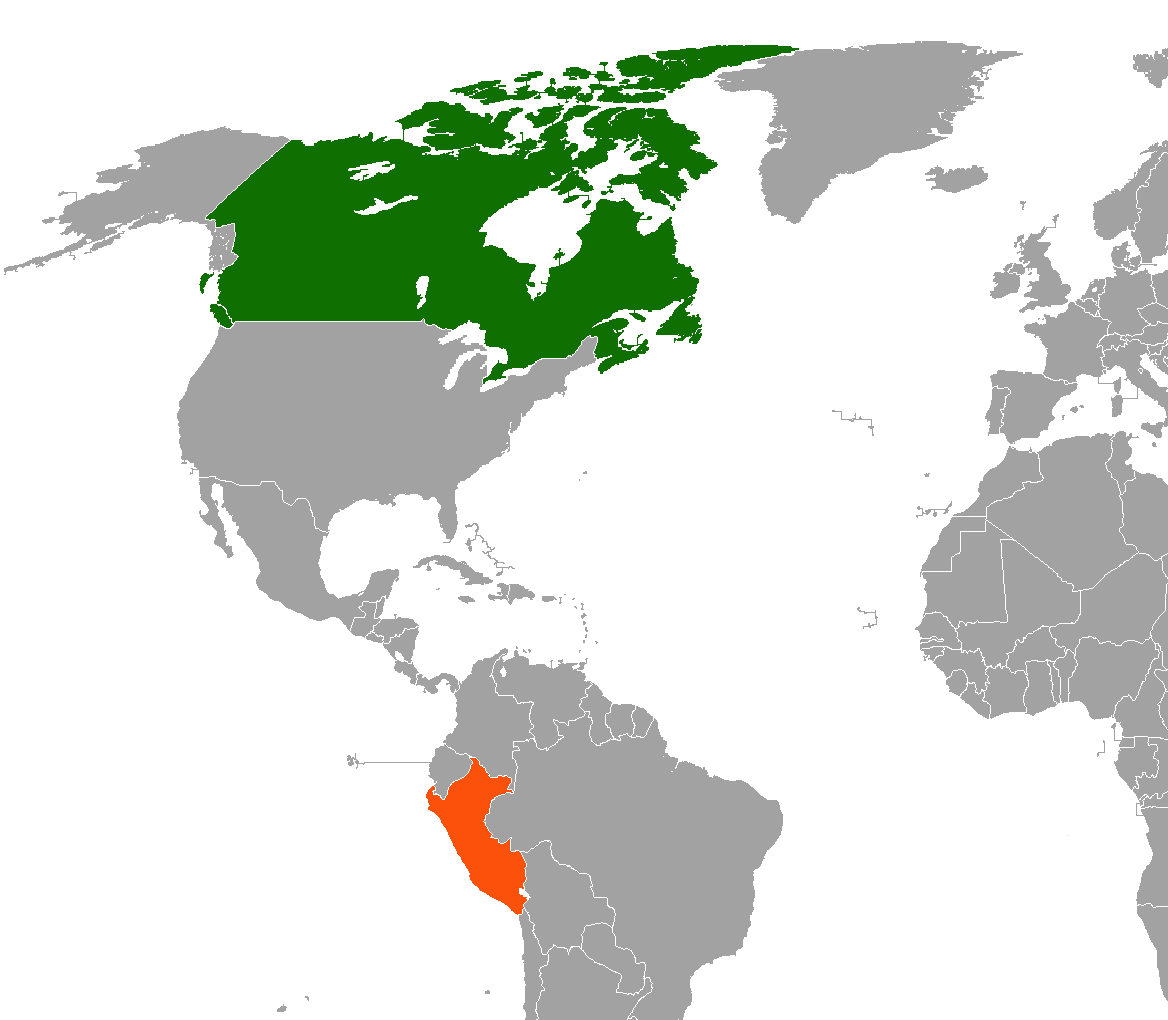

- Canada: Peru

Canada–Peru relations are the diplomatic and bilateral relations between Canada and the Republic of Peru, they established diplomatic relations in 1944. Both nations are members of the Asia-Pacific Economic Cooperation, Cairns Group, Lima Group, Organization of American States, World Trade Organization and the United Nations.

== History ==
Canada and Peru established diplomatic relations on 21 October 1944. Initially, relations between both nations took place in multilateral organizations. In May 1970, Canadian forces arrived in Peru soon after the Ancash earthquake to deliver humanitarian aid for two months in response to the request by President Juan Velasco Alvarado.

In February 1997, during the Japanese embassy hostage crisis in Lima, Peruvian President Alberto Fujimori flew to Toronto and met with the Japanese Prime Minister, Ryutaro Hashimoto, to discuss Peru's handling of the hostage siege. Canada was chosen as a meeting place for the two heads of state because its Ambassador to Lima, Anthony Vincent, was a member of a commission of guarantors established to oversee negotiations to end the crisis.

In 2004, Air Canada initiated flights between Toronto and Lima. In November 2008, Canadian Prime Minister Stephen Harper traveled to Peru to attend the 20th APEC Summit in Lima. Prime Minister Harper would re-visit Peru again in 2013. In April 2014, Peruvian President Ollanta Humala paid a state visit to Canada. In November 2016, Canadian Prime Minister Justin Trudeau paid a visit to Peru to attend the 28th APEC Summit in Lima. In 2016, Canada became an Associate member of the Pacific Alliance, which includes Peru, Chile, Colombia and Mexico.

In March 2018, Peruvian President, Pedro Pablo Kuczynski, was impeached from power. Martín Vizcarra was Ambassador of Peru to Canada and simultaneously was First Vice President of Peru. Upon the impeachment of President Kuczynski, Vizcarra left Canada and returned to Peru to take up the Presidency. In April 2018, Prime Minister Trudeau returned to Peru to attend the 8th Summit of the Americas in Lima. During his visit, Prime Minister Trudeau met with President Vizcarra and both leaders discussed enhancing bilateral commercial relations and underscored the many opportunities that exist for collaboration between Canadian and Peruvian companies. The Prime Minister and President also discussed the Crisis in Venezuela.

In 2019, both nations commemorated 75 years of diplomatic relations.

== High-level visits ==
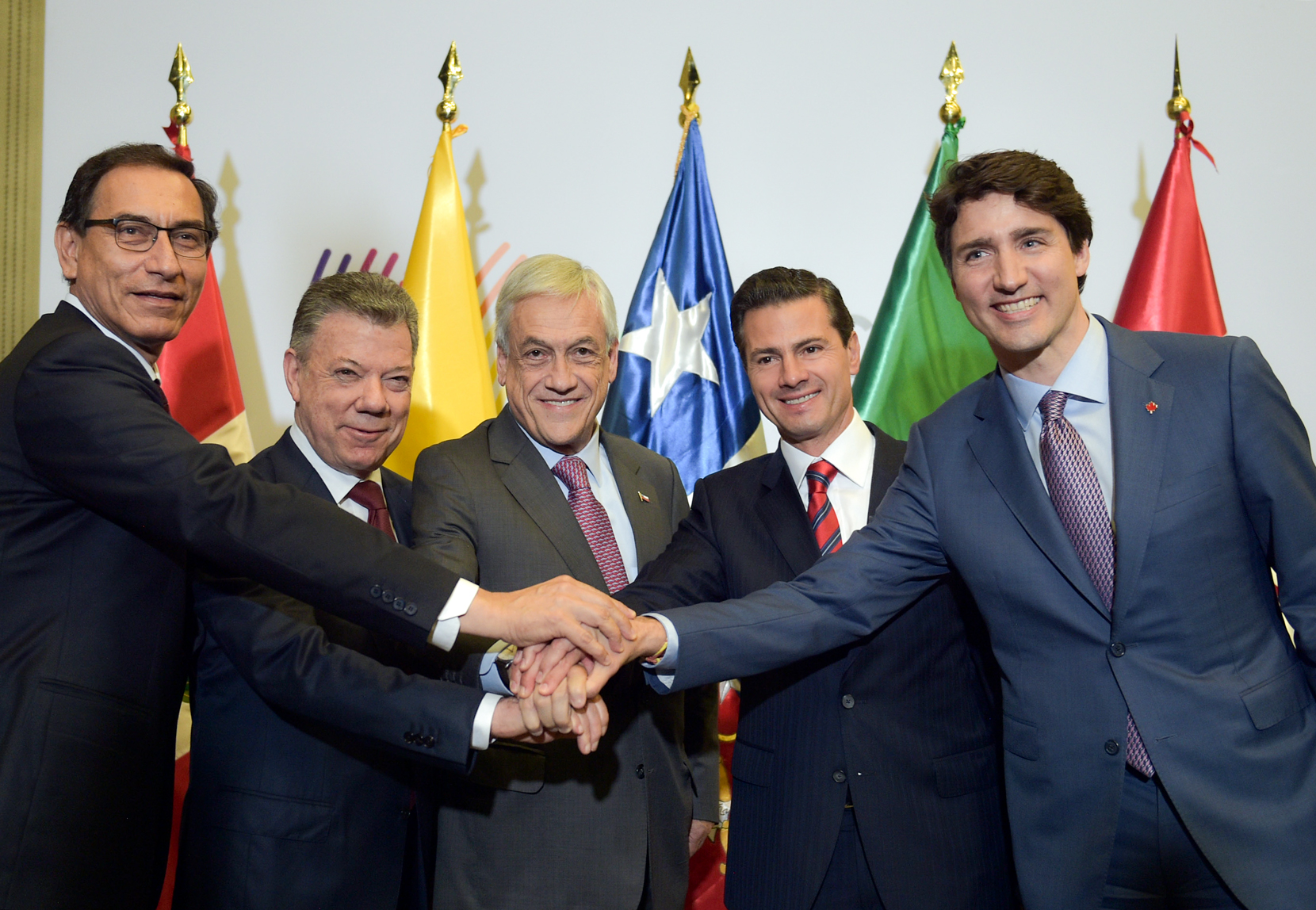
Peruvian President Martín Vizcarra and Canadian Prime Minister Justin Trudeau during a meeting between leaders of the Pacific Alliance and Canada in Lima; April 2018.

High-level visits from Canada to Peru

- Prime Minister Stephen Harper (2008, 2013)
- Governor General David Johnston (2012)
- Prime Minister Justin Trudeau (2016, 2018, 2024)
- Governor General Julie Payette (2019)

High-level visits from Peru to Canada

- President Alberto Fujimori (1997)
- President Ollanta Humala (2014)

== Bilateral agreements ==
Both nations have signed several agreements such as an Agreement on Exemption of Taxes on Automobiles of Diplomatic Officials for Sale (1957); Agreement for Air Services (1957); Agreement to Allow Amateur Radio Stations to Exchange Messages or other Communications from Third Parties (1964); Agreement for Canadian Nurses and Volunteer Technicians to work at the Peruvian Ministry of Public Health and Social Assistance (1967); Agreement on the sale of wheat (1970); Free Trade Agreement (2009); Agreement on the Environment (2009) and an Agreement on Labor Cooperation (2009).

== Trade ==
In May 2008, Canada and Peru signed a Free Trade Agreement which took effect on 1 August 2009. In 2018, two-way trade between both nations totaled US$2 billion. Canadian foreign direct investment in Peru totaled US$14.2 billion in 2018, mainly in mining, oil, gas and financial services. Canadian multinational company, Scotiabank, operates in Peru.

== Resident diplomatic missions ==
- Canada has an embassy in Lima.
- Peru has an embassy in Ottawa and consulates-general in Montreal, Toronto and Vancouver.
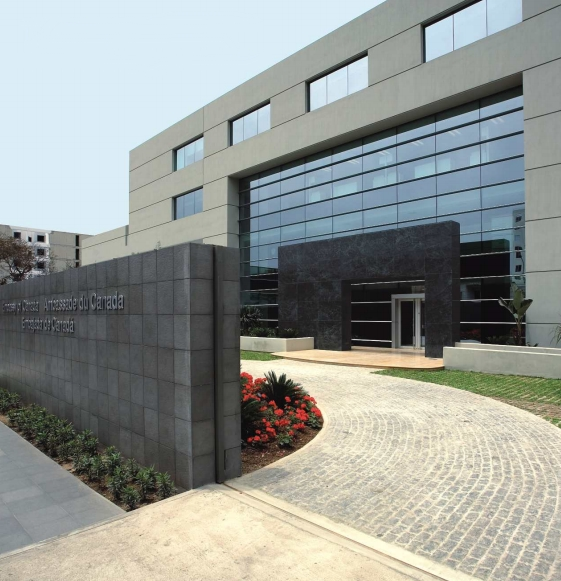
Embassy of Canada in Lima

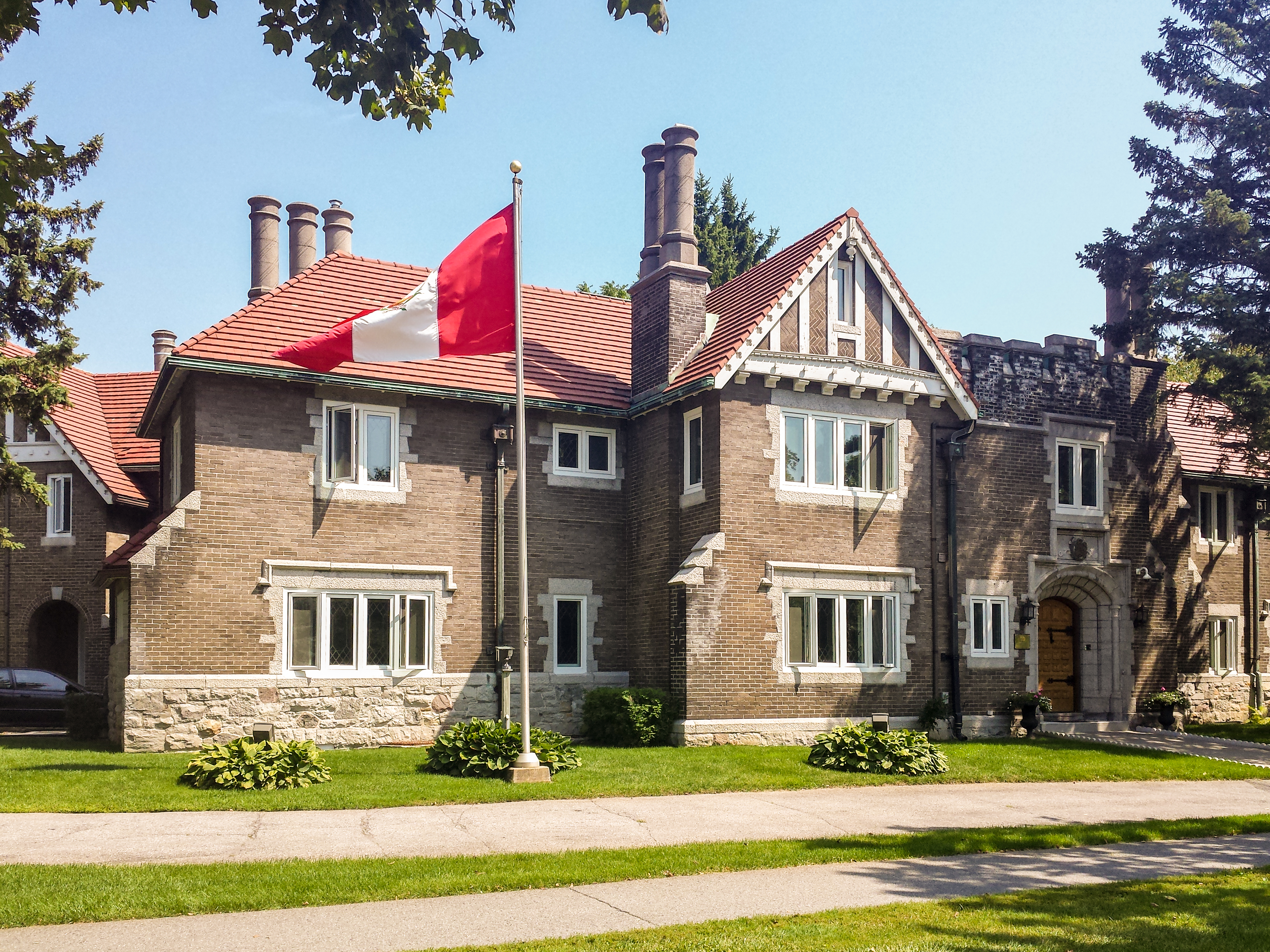
Residence of the Embassy of Peru in Ottawa

== See also ==
- List of ambassadors of Peru to Canada
- Canada–Peru Free Trade Agreement
- Peruvian Canadians
