= Canada–European Free Trade Association Free Trade Agreement =

2008 trade agreement

Free Trade Agreement between Canada and the states of the European Free Trade Association (Iceland, Liechtenstein, Norway and Switzerland)
- Canada (blue) and the EFTA states (green)
- Type: Trade agreement
- Signed: January 26, 2008
- Location: Davos, Switzerland
- Effective: July 1, 2009
- Condition: Approval by all signatories
- Signatories: 5
- Parties: Canada; Iceland; Liechtenstein; Norway; Switzerland
- Depositary: Norway
- Languages: English and French

The Canada–European Free Trade Association Free Trade Agreement is a trade agreement between Canada and the member states of the European Free Trade Association (Iceland, Norway, Switzerland and Liechtenstein). Signed in Davos, Switzerland on January 26, 2008, it came into effect on July 1, 2009. The agreement is aimed at eliminating all tariffs on goods between Canada and EFTA members.

In 1999, Canada entered into free trade negotiations with the EFTA. Negotiations concluded successfully in June 2007, and the FTA between Canada and the EFTA States was signed on January 26, 2008. Bilateral Agreements on Agriculture between Canada and each EFTA State were appended to the CEFTA. Both came into effect on July 1, 2009. The agreement eliminates almost all tariffs, with certain agricultural and fishery products being excluded from immediate tariff elimination.

Bilateral trade totaled $10.7 billion in 2006 (With Canadian imports from the EFTA valued at $7.6 billion and Exports to the EFTA at $3.1 Billion). Investments between the EFTA and Canada are valued at $22 billion in 2006. The agreement is Canada's first free trade agreement with any European nation.

== See also ==
- Comprehensive Economic and Trade Agreement
- Economy of Canada
- Trade bloc
- Economy of Iceland
- Economy of Norway
- Economy of Liechtenstein
- Economy of Switzerland
- Canada's Global Markets Action Plan
- Free trade agreements of Canada
- Rules of Origin
- Market access
- Free-trade area
