= Trade Commissioner Service =

Canadian Trade Commissioner Service
Agency overview
- Formed: 1894
- Jurisdiction: Government of Canada
- Minister responsible: Maninder Sidhu, Minister of International Trade
- Deputy Minister responsible: Glenn Purves, Deputy Minister
- Agency executives: Sara Wilshaw, Chief Trade Commissioner; John Short Larke, First Trade Commissioner
- Parent department: Global Affairs Canada
- Website: www.tradecommissioner.gc.ca

Part of Global Affairs Canada, the Canadian Trade Commissioner Service (TCS, French: Service des délégués commerciaux) is a network of more than 1000 trade professionals working in Canadian embassies, high commissions, and consulates located in 161 cities around the world and with offices across Canada.

== Role ==
The Trade Commissioner Services (TCS) assists companies in various aspects of international business, including exporting, foreign investment, attracting investment, and establishing innovation and research and development partnerships. Their primary objective is to support Canadian companies in their international business development.

== Services for Canadian businesses ==
The Canadian Trade Commissioner Service offers four key services which are designed to support the growth of Canadian companies internationally.

The four key services are:

- Preparing Canadian companies for international markets
- Providing an assessment of the company's potential in a target market through the use of market intelligence and providing advice on market strategies
- Finding qualified contacts
- Resolving problems and business challenges

== Services for non-Canadian businesses ==
Global Affairs Canada (formerly the Department of Foreign Affairs and International Trade) also offers assistance to foreign companies interested in doing business in Canada. The Invest in Canada bureau is tasked with promoting, attracting and retaining foreign direct investment in Canada.

== History ==
Created in 1894, the Canadian Trade Commissioner Service (TCS) has 125 years of experience helping Canadian companies succeed in foreign markets by promoting the economic interests of Canada in the global marketplace.

== See also ==
- Minister of International Trade (Canada) (1983 – present)
- List of Canadian diplomats
- Canadexport - e-magazine of the Trade Commissioner Service
