= Canada–Panama Free Trade Agreement =

The Canada–Panama Free Trade Agreement is a free trade agreement between Canada and Panama that went into effect April 1, 2013. It was concluded on August 11, 2009, by Canadian Prime Minister Stephen Harper and Panamanian President Ricardo Martinelli and signed by the two countries' trade ministers on May 14, 2010. It was effective by December 2012, after both countries' parliamentary approval. The agreement eliminates Panamanian tariffs on 90% of goods from Canada. The remaining 10% will be phased out within the next ten years. Canada will remove 99% of its tariffs on goods from Panama, while keeping those on some imports of sugar, poultry, eggs and dairy products. Panama will end its ban on beef from Canada which was initiated after cases of mad cow disease were found in Canada in 2003.

In 2008, bilateral merchandise trade between Canada and Panama totaled $150 million. Trade has increased by 48 percent from 2007. Canada made up $127.9 million of total trade between the two countries, while Panama made up the remaining $21.2 million.

Both countries' parliaments needed to approve the agreement before it could come into force. Some in Canadian opposition parties considered stalling it for their consideration of Panama as a tax haven.

The agreement was negotiated over four meetings. The first negotiation started in October 2009. The negotiations followed two exploratory meetings over a possible agreement.

In 1998, Panama and Canada signed the Foreign Investment Promotion and Protection Agreement (FIPA). This agreement placed rights and obligations on foreign direct investments between the two countries. In 2006, FDI in Panama by Canadian companies was $111 million.

On May 14, 2010, Canada's International Trade Minister Peter Van Loan, along with Panama's Minister of Commerce and Industry, Roberto Henríquez, signed the Canada–Panama Free Trade Agreement (FTA), as well as parallel agreements on labor cooperation and the environment.

On June 11, 2012 a bill to implement the trade, environmental, and labor agreements were introduced in the Canadian parliament as Bill C-24.

== See also ==
- Free trade agreements of Canada
- Economy of Canada
- Trans-Pacific Partnership
- Canada's Global Markets Action Plan
