= Canada–Korea Free Trade Agreement =

Trade agreement between Canada and South Korea

- South Korean President Park Geun-hye meets with Canadian Prime Minister Stephen Harper and his delegation at the Blue House in Seoul
- Type: Free trade agreement
- Signed: March 11, 2014
- Location: Seoul, South Korea
- Effective: January 1, 2015
- Parties: Canada; South Korea
- Language: Korean, English, French

The Canada–Korea Free Trade Agreement (CKFTA; less often known as CSKFTA - Canada-South Korea Free Trade Agreement) is a free trade agreement between Canada and South Korea. The agreement was concluded at the Blue House in Seoul on 11 March 2014 by Stephen Harper, the Prime Minister of Canada, and Park Geun-hye, the President of South Korea. It is the first free trade agreement between Canada and an Asia Pacific nation. The agreement entered into force on 1 January 2015.

In the years since its ratification, Canada has aimed to eliminate 97.8% of its tariff lines for goods imported from South Korea, and South Korea has aimed to eliminate 98.2% of its tariff lines for goods imported from Canada.

== Background ==
The two countries began discussing establishing a free trade agreement in 2005, and held 14 rounds of bargaining sessions before finalizing the agreement. Canada's trade with South Korea had dropped by about 1/3 after the conclusion of the European Union–South Korea Free Trade Agreement and the Free trade agreement between the United States of America and the Republic of Korea.

Canada's primary exports to South Korea in 2012 were non-renewable resources such as mineral fuels and oils (31%) and ores, slag, and ash (8.4%), and renewable resources such as wood pulp and paper products (9%). These totalled $3.7 billion in value, a decrease from $5 billion in 2011.

South Korea's primary exports to Canada in 2012 were transportation products such as automobiles, trailers, and bicycles (40%), machinery and appliances (17%), and electrical machinery and equipment (15%). These totalled $6.3 billion in value, a decrease from $6.6 billion in 2011.

== Tariffs ==
Canada agreed to eliminate tariffs on imported South Korean automobiles within two years of ratification of the trade deal. South Korea agreed to eliminate the 40% tariff on imported Canadian beef within 15 years of ratification of the trade deal. The tariff-free regime came into effect on January 1, 2015.

== Reaction ==
Representatives of Canada's automotive industry criticized the deal, stating that it "rapidly eliminates tariffs on Korean imports and does not include retaliatory measures", such as the 'snap-back' provisions in the Free trade agreement between the United States of America and the Republic of Korea. Dianne Craig, chief executive officer (CEO) and president of Ford Motor Company of Canada, stated that "South Korea will remain one of the most closed automotive markets in the world under the deal negotiated by the Canadian government" because South Korea imposes non-tariff barriers on imported vehicles. The government stated that automotive disputes between the two countries will be resolved within 177 days. Canada is South Korea's fifth-largest export market for automobiles, where South Korean automakers had 12% market share in 2013.

Farmers and ranchers in South Korea have opposed the deal since it was first proposed. The South Korean government's Ministry of Trade, Industry, and Energy predicts that Korean cattle ranchers and the livestock sector in general will suffer from the increase in Canadian imports.

== See also ==
- Canada–South Korea relations
- Economy of Canada
- Free trade agreements of Canada
- Canada's Global Markets Action Plan
- Rules of Origin
- Free-trade area
- Market access
