= Canada–Ukraine Free Trade Agreement =

- Type: Free trade agreement
- Signed: July 11, 2016
- Location: Kyiv, Ukraine
- Effective: August 1, 2017
- Parties: Canada; Ukraine

Canada–Ukraine Free Trade Agreement (CUFTA, French: Accord de libre-échange Canada-Ukraine (ALECU), Ukrainian: Угода про вільну торгівлю між Україною та Канадою) is a free-trade agreement between Canada and Ukraine. According to the agreement, the signing parties eliminate custom duties on essentially all goods produced in one country and imported to the other.

== History ==
On September 22, 2009, talks began between Canada and Ukraine on a free trade agreement began, as announced by Minister of International Trade for Canada Stockwell Day. Prime Minister of Ukraine Yulia Tymoshenko hoped for more effective cooperation with Canada once the trade deal was cemented.

In July 2015 Prime Minister of Ukraine Arseniy Yatsenyuk and Canadian prime minister Stephen Harper the successful conclusion of the Canada-Ukraine Free Trade Agreement.

The agreement was signed on 11 July 2016 in Kyiv, Ukraine, came into effect on 1 August 2017. The signing ceremony in Kyiv was attended by

- Justin Trudeau (Prime Minister of Canada)
- Chrystia Freeland (Minister of International Trade (Canada))
- Petro Poroshenko (President of Ukraine)
- Volodymyr Groysman (Prime Minister of Ukraine)
- Stepan Kubiv (First Vice Prime Minister of Ukraine and Minister of Economic Development and Trade of Ukraine).

The agreement entered into force on 1 August 2017 following its ratification in June 2017. In early 2020 Canada began public consultations on modernizing of the agreement. Canada and Ukraine announced new negotiations on modernizing CUFTA in January 2022.

== See also ==
- Canada–Ukraine relations
- Free-trade agreements of Canada
