= Canada–Peru Free Trade Agreement =

The Canada–Peru Free Trade Agreement (CPFTA) is a free trade agreement between Peru and Canada. It was signed on 29 May 2008 and entered into force on 1 August 2009.

The CPFTA facilitates establishment of free trade, creation of opportunities for economic development, elimination of trade barriers and promotion of fair competition.

== Negotiation and ratification ==
In August, 2002, Canada and the Andean Community agreed to discuss on proposed FTA. The Minister of International Trade had detail discussions on the subject with various groups in Canada including provincial and territorial governments to obtain advice and views. On June 7, 2007, David Emerson, Minister of International Trade, announced the launch of free trade negotiations between Canada and Colombia and Peru.

== Impact ==
=== Canada ===
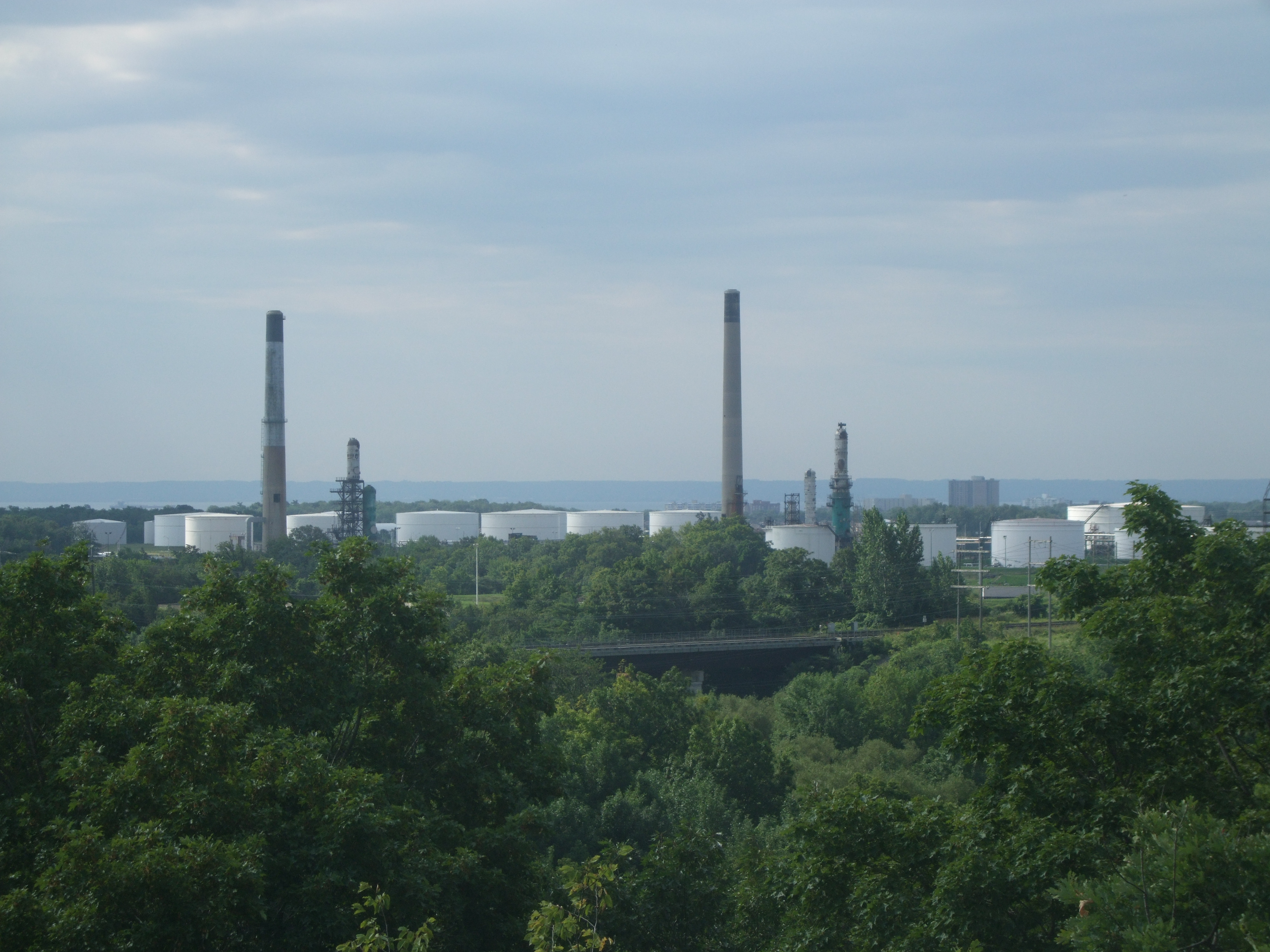
Petro Canada Oakville Refinery

The CPFTA creates a competitive advantage for Canadian producers and exporters in one of the friendly economies in South America. Peru's economy is fast-growing with GDP growth of 6.9% in 2011.

Peru has become one of the key partners of Canada in many aspects; it is the third-largest trading partner in Latin America and the Caribbean. In 2011 the value of Canadian exports to Peru reached $516 million, an increase of 36 percent over 2008, the year before the agreement came into force. Peru has become the third-largest nation attracting Canadian FDI in South and Central America.

==== Opportunities in Agriculture and Agri-food ====
The agreement positioned Canada into a competitive position where agricultural and agri-food producers and exporters are benefited by reduced and eliminated tariffs which ranged up to 25% previously.

There are potential opportunities for exports in the areas of durum wheat, malting barley and malt, pulses, canary seed, animal feed preparations, linseed, pork and certain live cattle and beef.

==== Opportunities in Mining and Oil and Gas ====
The tariffs which was previously ranged up to 12 percent on Canadian mining and oil and gas equipment, are eliminated by the agreement. Peru's reserves on zinc, lead, silver and gold is the largest in the South American Continent; it demands borers, crushers, drills, specialty vehicles and other mining equipments, along with engineering, geophysical and metallurgy services.

==== Opportunities in Information and Communications Technology (ICT) ====
The tariffs which was previously ranged up to 12 percent on Canadian ITC products, are eliminated by the agreement. Since Peru expands its ITC infrastructure, Canada has an opportunity to supply wireless communications, customized software solutions, geomatics and health-related solutions.

==== Opportunities in Services Sector ====
Peru has enough liquidity to carry out huge projects in public and private sectors. Peruvian government has initiated to activate infrastructure projects worth $40 billion over the forthcoming 5 years.

Canadian companies are in a competitive position by their years long experience on building water treatment projects, hydro-electric power generators, mass transit systems and award-winning ports and airports despite geographic and climate challenges of remoteness, high altitudes, extreme cold and heat and water scarcity, to secure contracts successfully in wide range of government procurement projects. Canadian banks and other insurance and securities sectors are other beneficiaries by the wider access in Peru.

=== Peru ===
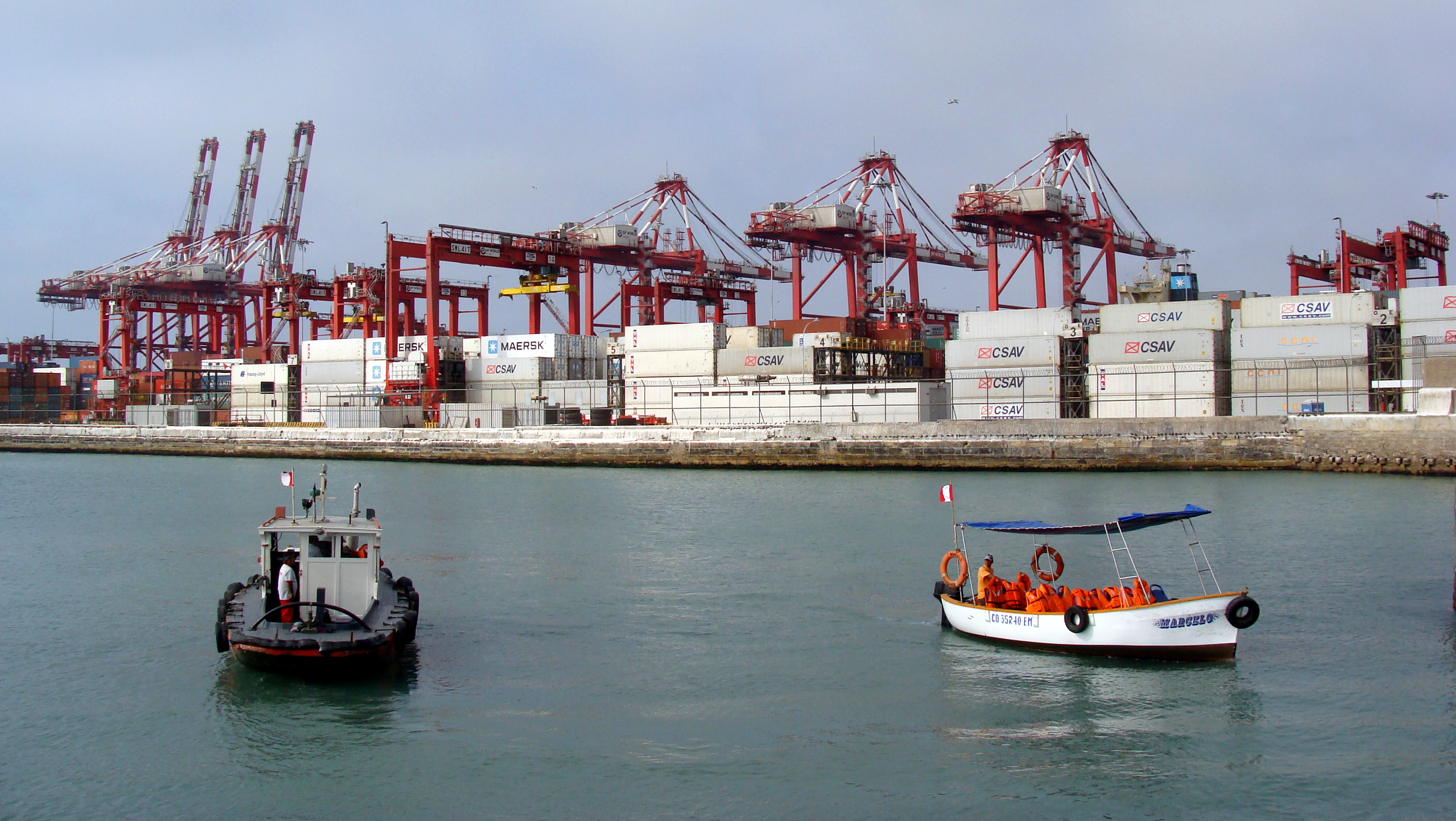
The Port of Callao, Peru's gateway for exports and imports

==== History of trade balances ====
(Amounts in thousands of Canadian dollars)

Trade Type	2010	2011	2012	2013	2014	2015	2016
Total Canadian Exports	476,446	516,424	536,427	606,091	796,123	858,287	764,492
Total Canadian Imports	3,619,098	4,402,677	3,683,887	3,075,771	3,028,308	3,260,125	2,457,388
Trade Balance	−3,142,652	−3,886,253	−3,147,460	−2,469,680	−2,232,185	−2,401,839	−1,692,896

==== Investment ====
The Free Trade Agreement was updated and integrated with previously existed the Canada-Peru Foreign Investment Promotion and Protection Agreement (FIPA) which had been in force since June 2007.

The modified FTA facilitates Canadian investors in many ways; it provides stability, transparency and protection for their investments. Investors further benefits by binding international arbitration when it comes resolving disputes. Both the FIPA and the FTA have prompted Canada to become one of the most important sources of FDI in Peru's mining sector.

The following are some of the valuable investment opportunities:

- Mining (Gold and Iron)
- Infrastructure (Roads, Irrigation Systems and Ports)
- Telecommunications (Telephony, Wireless and Internet Services)
- Oil and Gas

== Disputes and controversies ==
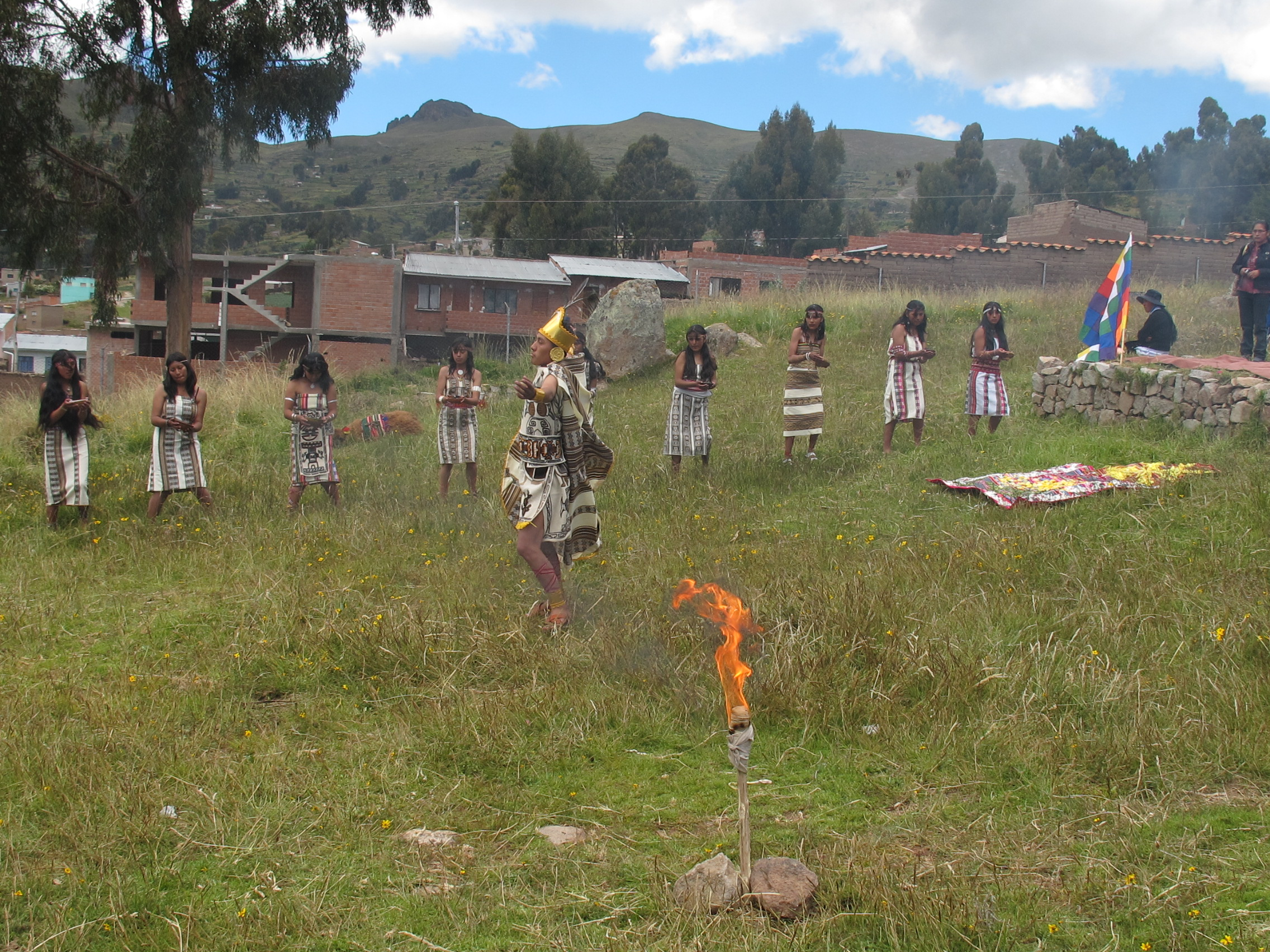
Aymara ceremony; Aymara indigenous people live around some of the mining areas.

In Peru's southern Andes, Vancouver-based company Bear Creek's proposed Santa Ana mine resulted in the deaths of at least five locals at the hands of police. In a company press release, Bear Creek CEO Andrew Swarthout blamed the protests on a "pre-election political climate", and insisted that "Bear Creek has received strong local community support for our Santa Ana project". The protests were so uncontainable however that the previous Peruvian government of Alan García suspended Bear Creek's licence.

Bear Creek has applied for a constitutional injunction against the Peruvian government in its retaliation to the García's decision. Swarthout contends that the cancellation of the concession is unconstitutional and in violation of foreign investment laws. He noted that it is plausible that Bear Creek could use the Canada–Peru Free Trade Agreement to challenge the loss of their concession.

Since there were widespread conflicts over the mining, the Peruvian congress signed into law a bill that requires mining and oil companies to consult with Indigenous communities before constructing extractive projects.

== See also ==
- Canada–Peru relations
- Canada's Global Markets Action Plan
- Economy of Canada
- Free trade agreements of Canada
