= Canada–Jordan Free Trade Agreement =

2012 trade agreement

The Canada–Jordan Free Trade Agreement (CJFTA) is a free trade agreement between Canada and Jordan. The bilateral agreement has been in force since October 2012.
