= Canada–Central American Four Free Trade Agreement =

The Canada–Central American Four Free Trade Agreement was a proposed free trade agreement between Canada and the Central American states of Guatemala, El Salvador, Honduras, and Nicaragua (collectively referred to as the Central American Four or CA4). (Note: At the time Canada already had a bilateral FTA with another Central American country, Costa Rica.) Twelve rounds of negotiations were undertaken between 2001 and 2010, after which no agreement had been reached. Canada and Honduras instead decided to pursue a bilateral agreement between themselves, and those negotiations concluded successfully in August 2011.

The United States negotiated and ratified a similar treaty with these countries, called the Central American Free Trade Agreement. In a referendum on October 7, 2007, the voters of Costa Rica narrowly backed the free trade agreement with the U.S., with about 52 percent of "Yes" votes.

== See also ==
- List of free trade agreements
