= Canada–Colombia Free Trade Agreement =

2008 trade agreement

- Type: Free trade agreement
- Signed: November 21, 2008
- Effective: August 15, 2011
- Parties: Canada; Colombia

The Canada–Colombia Free Trade Agreement is a trade agreement between the countries of Canada and Colombia.

In August 2002, it was announced that Canada and the Andean Community of Nations—Bolivia, Colombia, Ecuador, and Peru—had agreed to begin preliminary discussions towards a free trade agreement (FTA). Given that not all Andean Community countries were in a position to move forward on FTA negotiations at the same time, Canada worked toward FTAs with Colombia and Peru only as announced in June 2007. The agreement with Colombia was implemented on August 15, 2011.

Canada and Colombia enjoy good commercial and investment relations as the presence of Canadian companies, particularly in the mining, oil exploration, and printing sectors, continues to grow. In 2010 two-way merchandise trade between Canada and Colombia totalled more than $1.4 billion.

Canadian merchandise exports to Colombia totalled $644 million in 2010; major exports include goods such as cereals (wheat, barley), machinery, vegetables (pulses such as lentils, peas, chickpeas), paper and paperboard, and vehicles. Canadian merchandise imports from Colombia totalled $717 million in 2010. Major imports consist of mineral fuels and oils, coffee, fruits, and sugar. As of 2010, the accumulated value of Canadian investment in Colombia was $824 million. This investment is primarily in the oil and gas and mining sectors, although important links also exist in the printing sector.

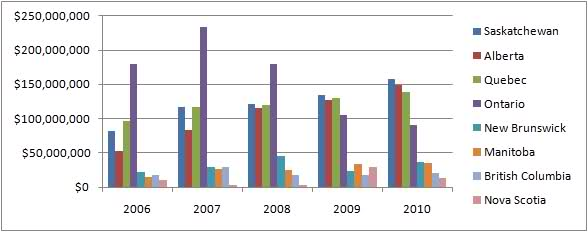
Exports of Canadian provinces to Colombia ($CAD)

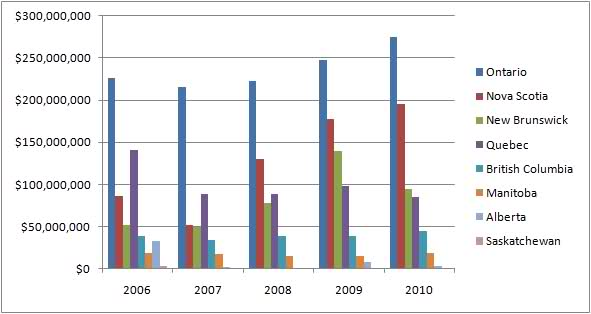
Imports of Canadian provinces from Colombia ($CAD)

== Overall commerce of FTAs ==
According to Statistics Canada, this is the 2010 trade balance Canada had with other countries:

Country	Trade Type	Amount (Thousands $CAD)
United States	Total Exports	$298,649,075
	Total Imports	$203,343,670
	Trade Balance	$95,305,405
Jordan	Total Exports	$66,038
	Total Imports	$19,927
	Trade Balance	$46,111
Panama	Total Exports	$129,501
	Total Imports	$84,207
	Trade Balance	$45,294
Colombia	Total Exports	$642,275
	Total Imports	$717,266
	Trade Balance	-$74,991
Israel	Total Exports	$385,007
	Total Imports	$1,006,448
	Trade Balance	-$621,441
Chile	Total Exports	$587,467
	Total Imports	$1,872,339
	Trade Balance	-$1,284,872
Peru	Total Exports	$476,446
	Total Imports	$3,619,098
	Trade Balance	-$3,142,652
European Union	Total Exports	$34,595,164
	Total Imports	$48,009,401
	Trade Balance	-$13,414,237
Mexico	Total Exports	$5,008,227
	Total Imports	$22,111,308
	Trade Balance	-$17,103,081
