= Canada's Global Markets Action Plan =

The Global Markets Action Plan (GMAP) was Prime Minister Stephen Harper's government strategy to generate employment opportunities for Canadians by expanding Canadian businesses and investment in other countries in a highly competitive global environment.

After Ed Fast was appointed Minister of International Trade in 2011, Harper asked him for a blueprint prioritizing trade in Canada's foreign policy. On November 27, 2013, Fast delivered a comprehensive report on a Global Markets Action Plan.

== History ==
Harper's government was highly concerned to maintain Canada's competitive position in international trade, which is equivalent to more than 60 percent of Canada's annual gross domestic product; one out of five jobs was created by the global market presence.

In 2007, the government launched its Global Commerce Strategy for expanding Canada's trade network, strengthening its competitive position in its traditional markets, and extending its reach to new emerging markets. The strategy was successful and led Canada to finalize seven different free trade pacts. It also activated an Economic Action Plan 2012 with the wider participation of Canada's business community to identify new markets, strengths and opportunities.

Finally they all came out with the new Global Markets Action Plan on November 27, 2013, to achieve these objectives.

== Target markets ==
The plan targeted distinctive three different markets;

- emerging markets with broad Canadian interests;
- emerging markets with specific opportunities for Canadian businesses; and
- established markets with broad Canadian interests.

== Key elements ==
The plan included the following key elements:

- a new trade promotion plan utilizing state resources and services to optimize the commercial interests of Canada in key markets abroad successfully;
- ensuring that Canada's trade policy tools are prioritized toward initiatives that will yield the maximum economic benefits to Canadian workers and businesses;
- constantly promoting Canada's position to access the world's two largest markets—the European Union and the United States with total customers-base of more than 800 million, and well over half of the entire global marketplace; and
- renewed stakeholder linkages to ensure that government priorities are in sync with the needs of businesses, and that the plan adapts to changes in the global economy.

== Advisory council ==
Ed Fast installed a nine-member advisory council consists of Canada's leading corporate leaders.

== Trade promotions ==
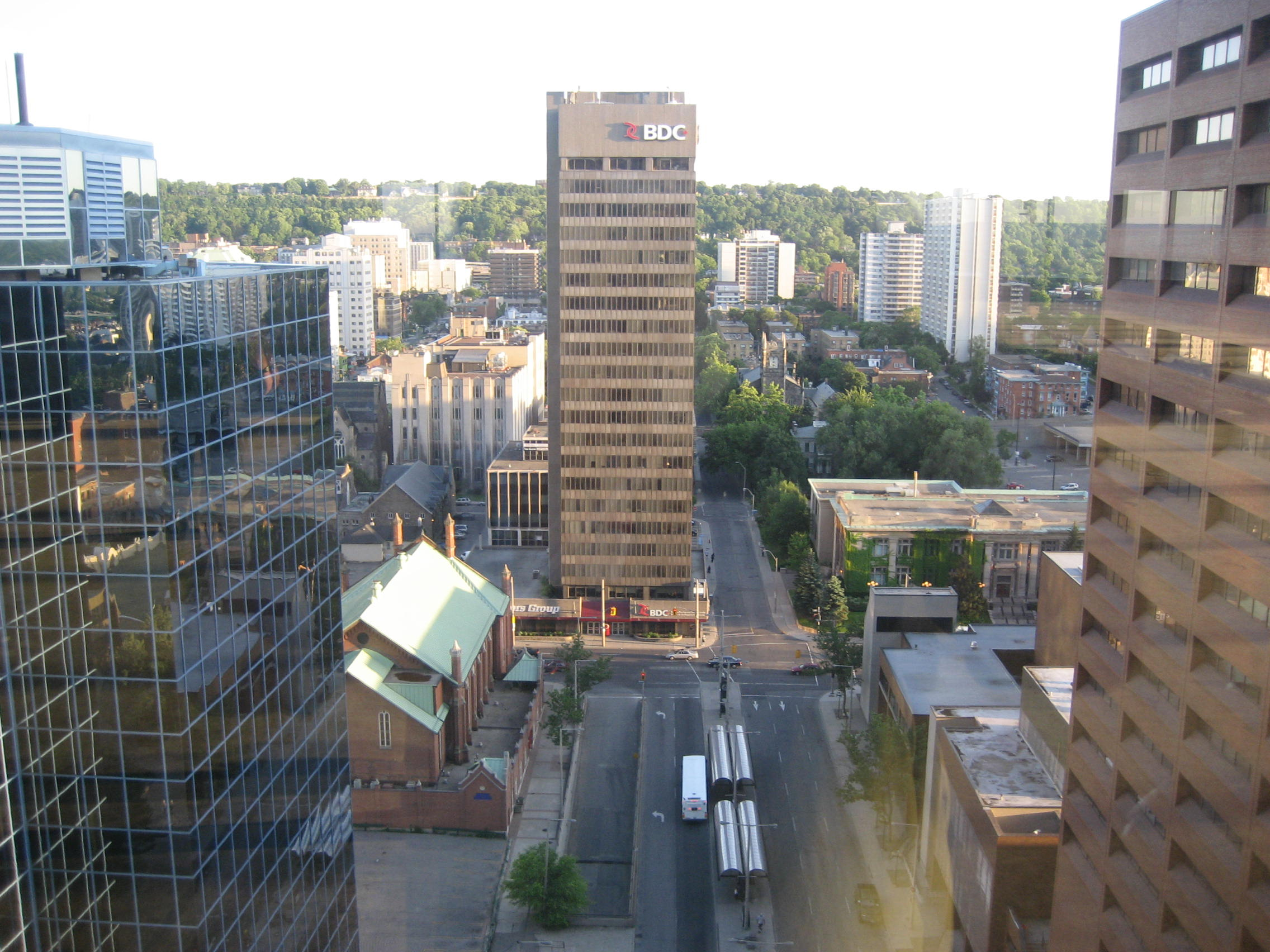
Business Development Bank of Canada at Hamilton, Ontario; the bank's mandate is to help create and develop Canadian businesses through financing, growth and transition capital, venture capital and consulting services, with a focus on small and medium-sized enterprises.

Global Markets Action Plan was planned in a way to make significant impact on Canada's trade-promotion efforts facilitating Canadian businesses to optimize their export potential in overseas markets; which creates jobs and opportunities for workers and their families in Canada.

=== Small and Medium-sized Enterprises(SMEs) ===
In March 2015, Harper permitted a $50 million financial assistance over a period of five years to facilitate the Canadian small and medium-sized enterprises (SMEs) on market research and participating trade missions; the funding would help approximately 500 to 1000 entrepreneurs in Canada yearly to reach their full export capacity.

==== Five-Year Target to Increase SMEs Exporting to Emerging Markets ====
Global Markets Action Plan outlined how to support Canada's critical SME sector to establish in emerging markets. The ultimate goal of the strategy was to increase SME export presence in emerging markets from 29 percent to 50 percent by 2018 and from 11,000 to 21,000 companies; this growth would create over 40,000 net new jobs.

In a fiercely competitive global economy, Canada cannot be complacent.

We must be more aggressive and effective than the intense competition we face as we advance Canada's commercial interests in key global markets. This new plan represents a sea change in the way Canada's diplomatic assets are deployed around the world, and in so doing, we are ensuring that the commercial success of Canadian firms and investors is entrenched as one of our core foreign policy objectives.

Ed Fast - Minister of International Trade

==== Steps to improve the SMEs ====
- reducing the small-business tax rate to 11 percent;
- increasing the income limit for the small-business tax rate from $300,000 to $500,000;
- implementing the "one-for-one rule" to cut unnecessary red tape, saving Canadian businesses more than $22 million in administrative burden as of June 2014, as well as 290,000 hours in time spent dealing with red tape;
- improving access to capital for innovative entrepreneurs by launching the Venture Capital Action Plan;
- supporting the hiring of apprentices with the Apprenticeship Job Creation Tax Credit, a non-refundable tax credit equal to 10 percent of the eligible salaries and wages payable to eligible apprentices; and
- increasing the lifetime capital gains exemption (LCGE) for small business owners from $500,000 to $800,000, and indexing this new limit to inflation. On account of indexation, the LCGE limit increased to $813,600 for 2015.

=== Trade Commissioner Service ===
Harper extended another $42 million over five years to enhance the Canadian Trade Commissioner Service, with $9.2 million per year thereafter. The funding would facilitate the expanded trade services: Canada opened four new trade offices in China, bringing the total number of offices there to 15, with more than 100 trade commissioners; and it strengthened its support network in India, where there are eight offices and nearly 50 trade commissioners. There were more than 25 trade commissioners being trained placing in number of business associations in order to gain better understanding of the Canadian exports.

== See also ==
- Free trade agreements of Canada
- Economy of Canada
- Trans-Pacific Partnership
