= Canada–Costa Rica Free Trade Agreement =

2001 trade agreement

The Canada–Costa Rica Free Trade Agreement (CCRFTA) is a free trade agreement between Costa Rica and Canada. It was signed on April 23, 2001 in Ottawa, Ontario, and came into effect on November 1, 2002. It is the first bilateral free trade agreement to include innovative stand-alone procedures on trade. 87% of all tariffs on agricultural products were eliminated, either immediately, or over a 7-14 year period. Tariffs on many other industries like automotive goods and goods were also eliminated. Several sectors of agriculture were excluded from the treaty; eggs, dairy, poultry and beef being excluded, and Costa Rica decided to leave potatoes out of the FTA. Both nations agreed to use the World Trade Organization rules for sanitary and phytosanitary issues (known as the SPS agreement).

The main goals of the FTA include:

- The establishment of free trade
- The creation of opportunities for economic development
- The elimination of trade barriers
- The promotion of fair competition

In the first 3 years of the agreement, trade increased by 36% (from $324 million to $440 million).

It has been proposed that the Free Trade Area of the Americas be modeled after the CCRFTA.

== History of trade balances ==
Trade Type	2010	2011	2012	2013	2014	2015	2016
Total Canadian Exports	99,930	160,756	185,463	114,618	152,066	162,704	144,362
Total Canadian Imports	436,057	475,705	513,405	590,949	578,028	503,119	508,510
Trade Balance	-336,127	-314,949	-327,942	-476,331	-425,962	-340,415	-364,148

Amounts in thousands of Canadian dollars.
