= Economy of Canada =

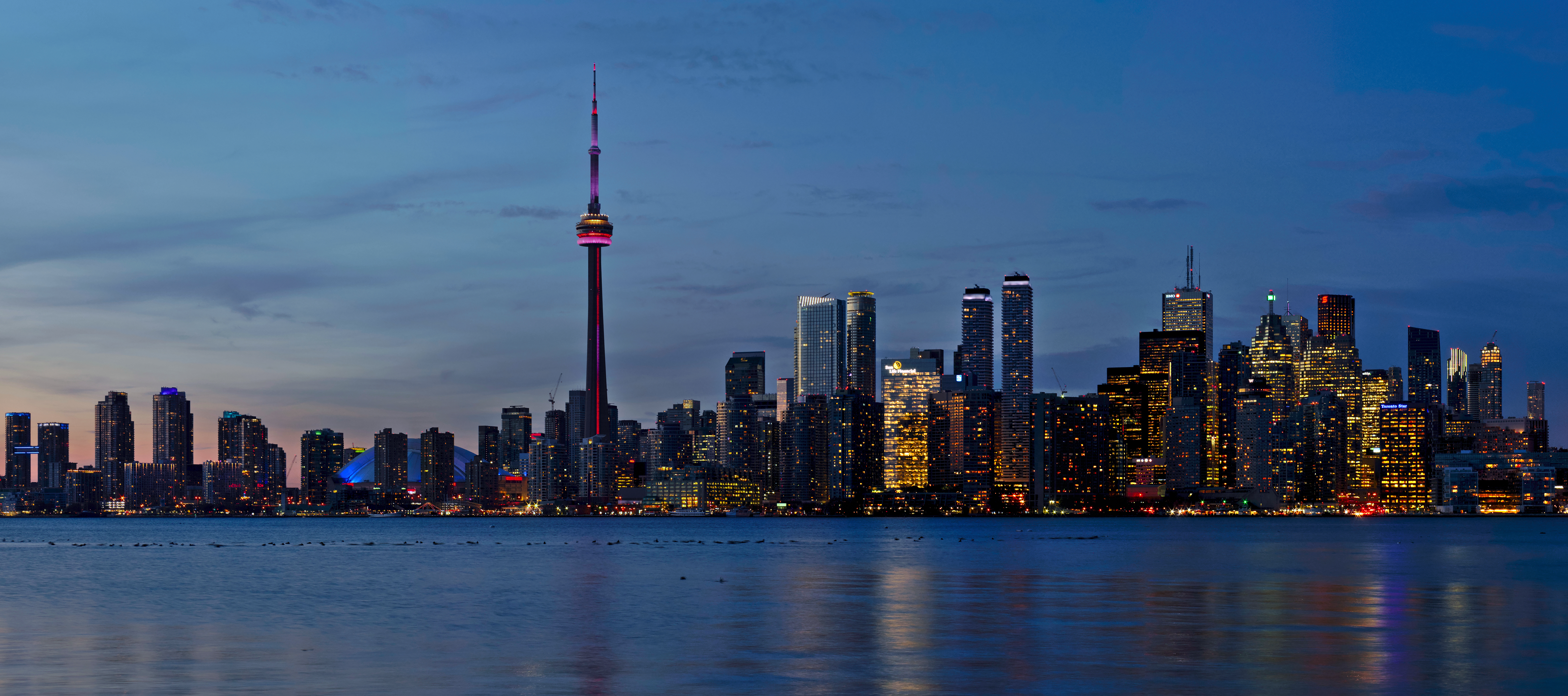
- Toronto, the financial centre of Canada
- Currency: Canadian dollar (CAD, C$)
- Fiscal year: April 1 – March 31
- Trade organizations: OECD, WTO, G-20, G7, USMCA, CPTPP, APEC and others
- Country group: Advanced economy; High-income economy; Welfare state

Statistics
- Population: ▼41,417,056 (Q2, 2026)
- GDP: ▲$2.49 trillion (nominal; 2026); ▲$2.92 trillion (PPP; 2026)
- GDP rank: 11th (nominal; 2026); 16th (PPP; 2026)
- GDP growth: ▲1.1% (2026); ▲1.7% (2027); ▲1.7% (2028)
- GDP per capita: ▲$60,105 (nominal; 2026); ▲$70,374 (PPP; 2026)
- GDP per capita rank: 21st (nominal; 2026); 24th (PPP; 2026)
- GDP per capita growth: 0.8% (2025)
- GDP by sector: agriculture (1.6%); industrial (25.3%); services (66.4%) (2021 estimate)* (2021 est.)}}
- Inflation (CPI): ▲3.2% (2026)
- Population below national poverty line: ▲3.2% (2022)
- Gini coefficient: ▲0.300 low (2023, StatCan)
- Human Development Index: ▲0.939 very high (2023) (16th); ▲0.867 very high IHDI (14th) (2023)
- Labour force: ▲22.83 million (2025); ▲60.7% employment rate (May 2026)
- Unemployment: ▼6.6% (May 2026); ▼1.2 million unemployed (December 2021)
- Youth unemployment: ▲13.4% (May 2026; 15 to 24 year-olds)
- Average gross salary: C$7,125 / US$5,018 monthly (2024, full-time)
- Average net salary: C$5,324 / US$3,749 monthly (2024)
- Main industries: Transportation equipment; chemicals; minerals; food products; wood and paper; fish products; petroleum; natural gas

External
- Exports: ▼US$726.6 billion (2025)
- Export goods: Motor vehicles and parts, industrial machinery, aircraft, telecommunications equipment; chemicals, plastics, fertilizers; wood pulp, timber, crude petroleum, natural gas, electricity, aluminum
- Main export partners: United States (-) 72.5%; European Union (-) 4.4%; China (+) 3.8%; United Kingdom (+) 3.6%; Japan (-) 1.9%; Other 9.9%
- Imports: ▲US$746.6 billion (2025)
- Import goods: Machinery and equipment, motor vehicles and parts, crude oil, chemicals, electricity, durable consumer goods
- Main import partners: United States (-) 47.6%; China (-) 12.4%; European Union (+) 11.8%; Mexico (+) 6.0%; Japan (+) 2.7%; Other 19.6%
- FDI stock: Inward: $1.460 trillion (2022); Outward: $2.096 trillion (2022)
- Current account: ▼$1.4 billion (Q3 2021)

Public finance
- Foreign reserves: US$122.9 billion (July 2024)
- Budget balance: −10% (of GDP) (2024 est.)
- Revenue: 485.9 billion (2024 est.)
- Spending: 534.5 billion (2024 est.)
- Economic aid: donor: ODA, US$7.8 billion (2022)
- Credit rating: Standard & Poor's: AAA; Outlook: Stable; Moody's: Aaa; Outlook: Stable; Fitch: AA+; Outlook: Stable
- All values, unless otherwise stated, are in US dollars.

Canada has an advanced and diversified mixed economy. The nation relies upon its abundant natural resources and well-developed international trade networks. As of 2026, it is the eleventh-largest in the world in nominal terms. Its GDP per capita in purchasing power parity (PPP) terms ranks third among G7 countries. Among OECD members, Canada has a highly efficient and strong social security system; social expenditure stood at roughly 23.1% of GDP. The country's average household disposable income per capita is "well above" the OECD average. The Government of Canada formulates economic policy while the Bank of Canada functions as its central bank and implements monetary policy.

The Canadian economy ranks low in corruption and income disparity while ranking highly on economic freedom and stability. Canada ranks among the lowest of the most developed countries for housing affordability. It maintains a highly developed banking sector with the Toronto Stock Exchange ranked the tenth-largest stock exchange in the world by market capitalization. Its cooperative banking sector is pronounced with the world's highest per-capita membership in credit unions. Among G20 members, Canada has the second-largest foreign direct investment to GDP ratio and the lowest net debt-to-GDP ratio in the G7.

== Contemporary era overview ==
Since the early 20th century, the growth of Canada's manufacturing, mining, and service sectors has transformed the nation from a largely rural economy to an urbanized, industrial one. The Canadian economy is dominated by the service industry, which employs about three-quarters of the country's workforce. Among developed countries, Canada has an unusually important primary sector, of which the forestry and petroleum industries are the most prominent components. Many towns in northern Canada, where agriculture is difficult, are sustained by nearby mines or sources of timber. Canada spends around 1.70% of GDP on advanced research and development across various sectors of the economy.

Canada's economic integration with the United States has increased significantly since World War II. The Automotive Products Trade Agreement of 1965 opened Canada's borders to trade in the automobile manufacturing industry. In the 1970s, concerns over energy self-sufficiency and foreign ownership in the manufacturing sectors prompted the federal government to enact the National Energy Program (NEP) and the Foreign Investment Review Agency (FIRA). The government abolished the NEP in the 1980s and changed the name of FIRA to Invest in Canada to encourage foreign investment. The Canada – United States Free Trade Agreement (FTA) of 1988 eliminated tariffs between the two countries, while the North American Free Trade Agreement (NAFTA) expanded the free-trade zone to include Mexico in 1994 (later replaced by the Canada–United States–Mexico Agreement). As of 2023, Canada is a signatory to 15 free trade agreements with 51 countries.

Canada is one of the few developed nations that are net exporters of energy. Atlantic Canada possesses vast offshore deposits of natural gas, and Alberta hosts the fourth-largest oil reserves in the world. The vast Athabasca oil sands and other oil reserves give Canada 13% of global oil reserves, constituting the world's third or fourth-largest. Canada is additionally one of the world's largest suppliers of agricultural products; the Canadian Prairies are one of the most important global producers of wheat, canola, and other grains. The country is a leading exporter of zinc, uranium, gold, nickel, platinoids, aluminum, steel, iron ore, coking coal, lead, copper, molybdenum, cobalt, and cadmium. Canada has a sizeable heavy manufacturing sector centred in southern Ontario and Quebec, with automobiles and aeronautics representing particularly important industries. The country's fishing and tourism industries are also key contributors to the economy.

== Monetary policy ==
The mandate of the central bank—the Bank of Canada—is to conduct monetary policy that manages inflation to ensure the Canadian dollar's long-term purchasing power.

Under the inflation-targeting monetary policy that has been the cornerstone of Canada's monetary and fiscal policy since the early 1990s, the Bank of Canada sets an inflation target. The inflation target was set at 2%, which is the midpoint of an inflation range of 1 to 3%. They established a set of inflation-reduction targets to keep inflation "low, stable and predictable" and to foster Canada's sustained economic growth, employment gains and improved standard of living.

Following the Great Recession, the narrow focus of inflation-targeting as a means of providing stable growth in the Canadian economy was revised. By 2011, the then-Bank of Canada Governor Mark Carney argued that monetary policy would allow for a more flexible inflation-targeting in specific situations, specifically those favorable to employment or economic gains.

The Bank of Canada reassessed their mandate 15 years later in 2026 in response to the COVID-19 pandemic and a trade war with the United States. Their framework was adjusted to prioritize reducing inflation, rising housing costs, and protection against supply shocks.

== Key industries ==
In 2024, the Canadian economy had the following relative weighting by the industry as a percentage value of GDP:

Industry	Share of GDP
Real estate and rental and leasing	13.16%
Manufacturing	8.96%
Health care and social assistance	8.03%
Finance and insurance	7.42%
Professional, scientific and technical services	7.33%
Construction	7.23%
Public administration	7.21%
Educational services	5.44%
Wholesale trade	5.42%
Retail trade	5.26%
Mining, quarrying, and oil and gas extraction	5.02%
Transportation and warehousing	4.44%
Information and cultural industries	3.47%
Administrative and support, waste management, and remediation services	2.66%
Accommodation and food services	2.22%
Utilities	2.04%
Other services (except public administration)	1.95%
Agriculture, forestry, fishing, and hunting	1.89%
Arts, entertainment and recreation	0.82%
Management of companies and enterprises	0.04%

=== Real estate, rental, and leasing ===
Canada's real estate market is the backbone of the economy, comprising over 13% of the GDP by sector in 2024. In 2024, housing investment accounted for 25% of national wealth, up from 21% in 2021. It is difficult to discern the actual contribution of other sectors (such as construction, Investment and financial services, manufacturing, and forestry) to real estate, rental and leasing, as these industries are intrinsically linked in a complex economy. The Bank of Canada has increased its mortgage bond holdings to target 50% of the fixed-rate primary issuances.

=== Defence ===
Canada's defence sector is a high-tech, export-driven industry, comprising nearly 600 firms that contribute over $9.6 billion in GDP. Centered heavily on aerospace, simulation, advanced manufacturing and cyber technology, the industry exports close to $8 billion annually.

=== Service sector ===
The service sector in Canada is vast and multifaceted, employing about three quarters of Canadians and accounting for 70% of GDP. The largest employer is the retail sector, employing almost 12% of Canadians. The retail industry is concentrated mainly in a small number of chain stores clustered together in shopping malls. In recent years, there has been an increase in the number of big-box stores, such as Walmart (of the United States), Real Canadian Superstore, and Best Buy (of the United States). This has led to fewer workers in this sector and the migration of retail jobs to the suburbs.

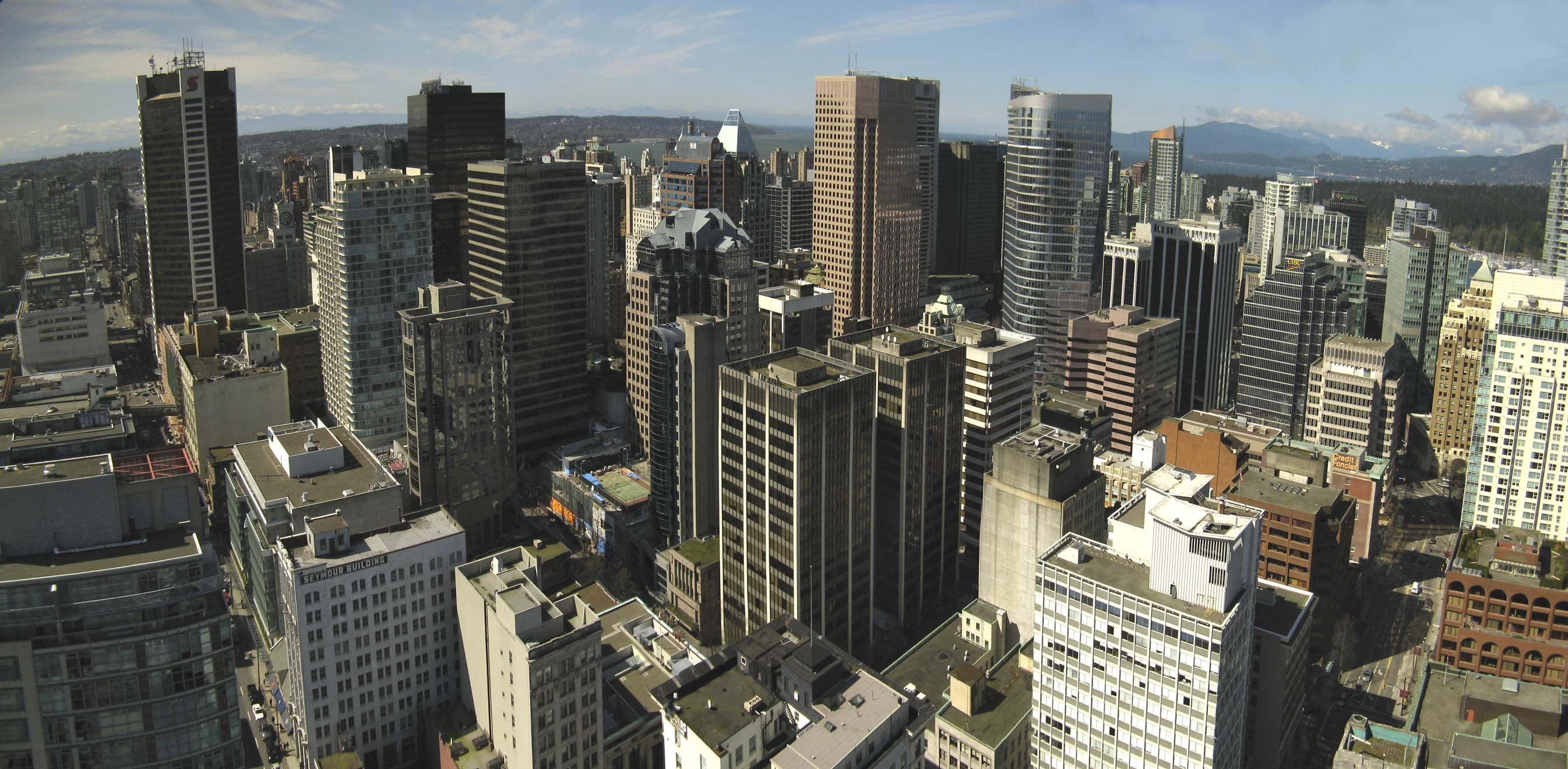
The Financial District in Downtown Vancouver. Canadian business services are largely concentrated in large urban areas of Canada.

The second-largest portion of the service sector is the business service, and it employs only a slightly smaller percentage of the population. This includes financial services, real estate, and communications industries. This portion of the economy has been rapidly growing in recent years. It is largely concentrated in the major urban centres, especially Toronto, Montreal and Vancouver.

The education and health sectors are two of Canada's largest, but both are primarily under the influence of the government. The health care industry has been quickly growing and is the third-largest in Canada.

Canada has an important high tech industry, and a burgeoning film, television, and entertainment industry creating content for local and international consumption (see Media in Canada). Tourism attracts millions of visitors and supports approximately 10% of the national labor force. In recent years, statistics show that Canada has received over 20 million international tourists annually. The summer months are especially popular for travelers both domestically and internationally. Tourism and supporting industries contributed over $100 billion to the Canadian national economy in 2024. The sector supports nearly 1.8 million Canadians working in tourism-related fields.

==== Banking and finance ====
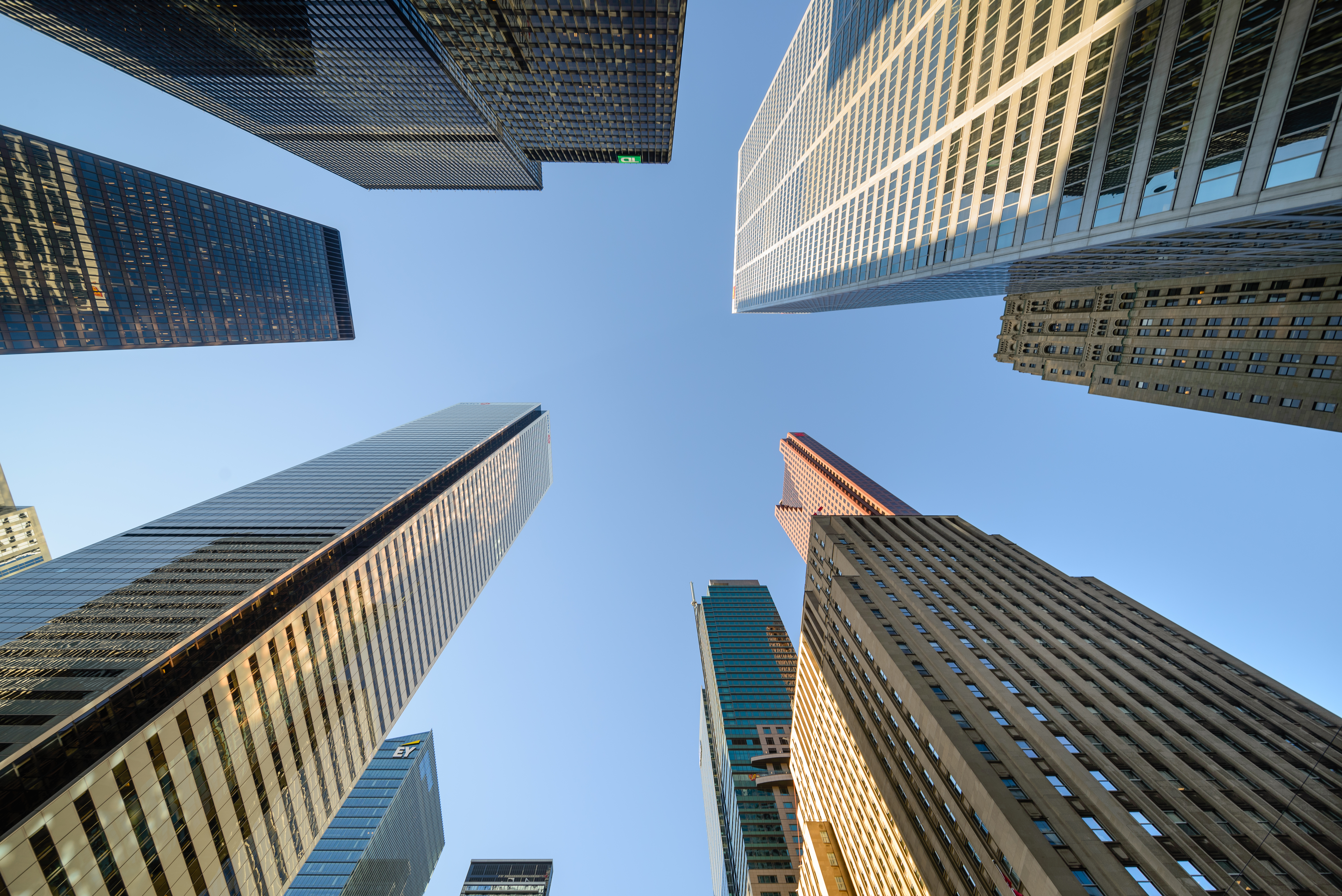
The towers at Bay and King Street in Toronto are home to four of Canada's five largest banks.

The banking sector of Canada is a large component of the nation's private sector and the broader Canadian economy. It is dominated by a small number of large banks, with the six largest combining for 93% of the banking assets. The two largest, the Royal Bank of Canada and the Toronto Dominion Bank are among the world's 25 largest banks. It has been considered to be one of the safest and soundest banking systems in the world.

Canada's banks have high service levels and investments in technology. A report released by the office of the Minister of Finance in 2002 states "Canada has the highest number of ATMs per capita in the world and benefits from the highest penetration levels of electronic channels such as debit cards, Internet banking and telephone banking". More recent data published by the World Bank shows that as of 2017 Canada has 227.82 ATMs per 100,000 adults, which ranks the country third worldwide.

==== Education ====
Education in Canada is for the most part provided publicly, funded and overseen by federal, provincial, and local governments. Education is within provincial jurisdiction and the curriculum is overseen by the province. Education in Canada is generally divided into primary education, followed by secondary education and post-secondary. Education in both English and French is available in most places across Canada. Canada has a large number of universities, almost all of which are publicly funded. Established in 1663, Université Laval is the oldest post-secondary institution in Canada. The largest university is the University of Toronto with over 85,000 students. Four universities are regularly ranked among the top 100 world-wide, namely the University of Toronto, University of British Columbia, McGill University, and McMaster University, with a total of 18 universities ranked in the top 500 worldwide.

According to a 2022 report by the Organisation for Economic Co-operation and Development (OECD), Canada is the most educated country in the world; the country ranks first worldwide in the percentage of adults having tertiary education, with over 57 per cent of Canadian adults having attained at least an undergraduate college or university degree. Canada spends an average of about 5.3 per cent of its GDP on education. The country invests heavily in tertiary education (more than US$20,000 per student). As of 2022, 89 per cent of adults aged 25 to 64 have earned the equivalent of a high-school degree, compared to an OECD average of 75 per cent.

The mandatory education age ranges between 5–7 to 16–18 years, contributing to an adult literacy rate of 99 per cent. Just over 60,000 children are homeschooled in the country as of 2016. The Programme for International Student Assessment indicates Canadian students perform well above the OECD average, particularly in mathematics, science, and reading, ranking the overall knowledge and skills of Canadian 15-year-olds as the sixth-best in the world, although these scores have been declining in recent years. Canada is a well-performing OECD country in reading literacy, mathematics, and science, with the average student scoring 523.7, compared with the OECD average of 493 in 2015.

==== Healthcare ====
Healthcare in Canada is delivered through the provincial and territorial systems of publicly funded single-payer healthcare, informally called Medicare. It is guided by the provisions of the Canada Health Act, adopted during 1984, and is universal. The 2002 Royal Commission, known as the Romanow Report, revealed that Canadians consider universal access to publicly funded health services as a "fundamental value that ensures national health care insurance for everyone wherever they live in the country".

Canadian Medicare provides coverage for approximately 70 percent of Canadians' healthcare needs, and the remaining 30 percent is paid for through the private sector. The 30 percent typically relates to services not covered or only partially covered by Medicare, such as prescription drugs, eye care, medical devices, gender care, psychotherapy, physical therapy and dentistry. About 65-75 percent of Canadians have some form of supplementary health insurance related to the aforementioned reasons; many receive it through their employers or use secondary social programs related to extended coverage for families receiving social assistance or vulnerable demographics, such as seniors, minors, and those with disabilities.

According to the Canadian Institute for Health Information (CIHI), by 2019, Canada's aging population represents an increase in healthcare costs of approximately one percent a year, which is a modest increase. In a 2020 Statistics Canada Canadian Perspectives Survey Series (CPSS), 69 percent of Canadians self-reported that they had excellent or very good physical health—an improvement from 60 percent in 2018. In 2019, 80 percent of Canadian adults self-reported having at least one major risk factor for chronic disease: smoking, physical inactivity, unhealthy eating, or excessive alcohol use. Canada has one of the highest rates of adult obesity among Organisation for Economic Co-operation and Development (OECD) countries attributing to approximately 2.7 million cases of diabetes (types 1 and 2 combined). Four chronic diseases—cancer (a leading cause of death), cardiovascular diseases, respiratory diseases and diabetes account for 65 percent of deaths in Canada. There are approximately 8 million individuals aged 15 and older with one or more disabilities in Canada.

In 2021, the Canadian Institute for Health Information reported that healthcare spending reached $308 billion, or 12.7 percent of Canada's GDP for that year. In 2022 Canada's per-capita spending on health expenditures ranked 12th among healthcare systems in the OECD. Canada has performed close to the average on the majority of OECD health indicators since the early 2000s, and ranks above average for access to care, but the number of doctors and hospital beds are considerably below the OECD average. The Commonwealth Funds 2021 report comparing the healthcare systems of 11 high-income countries ranked Canada second-to-last. Identified weaknesses of Canada's system were comparatively higher infant mortality rate, the prevalence of chronic conditions, long wait times, poor availability of after-hours care, and a lack of prescription drugs coverage. An increasing problem in Canada's health system is a shortage of healthcare professionals and hospital capacity.

==== Telecommunications ====
Present-day telecommunications in Canada include telephone, radio, television, and internet usage. In the past, telecommunications included telegraphy available through Canadian Pacific and Canadian National.

==== Tourism ====
Tourism in Canada is a major economic driver in the service sector, attracting millions of visitors and supporting approximately 10% of the national labor force. In recent years, statistics show that Canada has received over 20 million international tourists annually. The summer months are especially popular for travellers both domestically and internationally. Tourism and supporting industries contributed over $100 billion to the Canadian national economy in 2024. The sector supports nearly 1.8 million Canadians working in tourism-related fields.

Domestic tourism in Canada is the principal economic driver of the sector, with statistics indicating that, in 2024, about 70% of all tourism spending came from Canadian residents exploring their own country. Domestic statistics also indicate that travel within provinces is prevalent, with residents supporting local businesses and attractions. Land border crossings by United States citizens has historically been the largest source of inbound tourists, followed by international airline travel from the United Kingdom and other European countries. Visitors from Asia have become more popular in recent decades. Passport holders from over 50 visa-exempt countries and nationals who require a visa can visit Canada for up to six months at a time.

Federal, provincial, municipal and local government initiatives aimed at promoting sustainable tourism and attracting foreign tourists play a major role in the industry. Canada is known for its safety and security, attracting tourists through its natural features (e.g., Niagara Falls), festivals (e.g., Calgary stampede), arts (e.g., Toronto International Film Festival), heritage sites, (e.g., Quebec City) sporting events (e.g.,Grey Cup), amusement parks (e.g., Canada's Wonderland) and its diverse culture (e.g., Caribbean Carnival).

Canada's national parks like Banff and Jasper see millions of visitors annually, drawn by their landscapes and outdoor activities. Provincial parks including Algonquin Provincial Park, Bow Valley Provincial Park and Cabot Beach Provincial Park also attract a multitude of visitors annually. Natural wonders such as, Great Bear Rainforest, the Northern Lights, Hopewell Rocks, Sandbanks and Moraine Lake attract a variety of international and domestic tourist throughout the year. The country is home to numerous historical and cultural national museums and galleries, such as the Canadian Museum of History, Canadian Museum for Human Rights and National Gallery of Canada. Provincial museums that attract significance amount of tourist include, the Royal Ontario Museum, the Royal British Columbia Museum and the Nova Scotia museum system.

=== Manufacturing ===
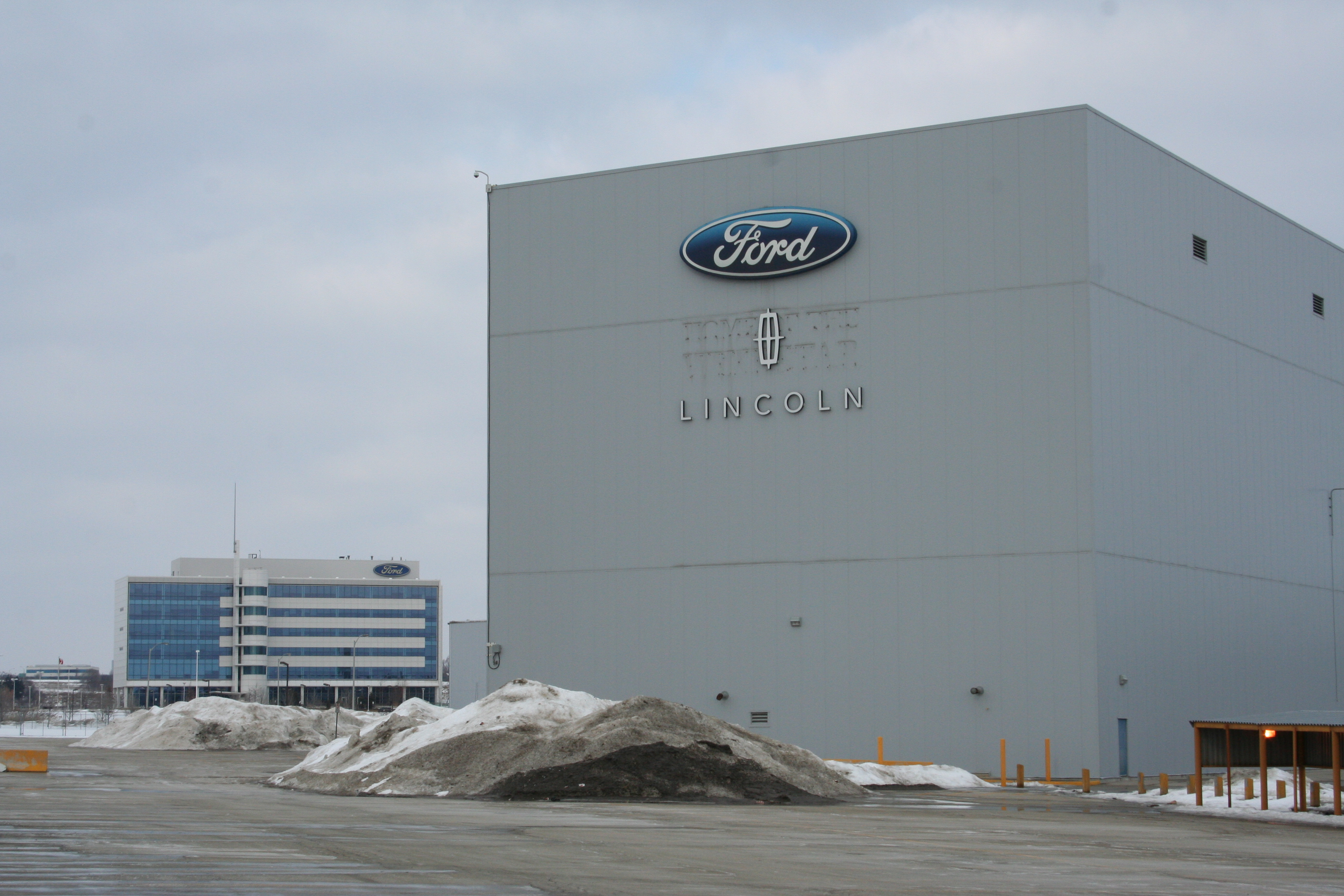
Ford's Oakville Assembly in the Greater Toronto Area. Central Canada is home to several auto factories of the major American and Japanese automakers.

The general pattern of development for wealthy nations was a transition from a raw material production-based economy to a manufacturing-based economy and then to a service-based economy. At its World War II peak in 1944, Canada's manufacturing sector accounted for 29% of GDP, declining to 10.37% in 2017. Canada has not suffered as greatly as most other rich, industrialized nations from the pains of the relative decline in the importance of manufacturing since the 1960s. A 2009 study by Statistics Canada also found that, while manufacturing declined as a relative percentage of GDP from 24.3% in the 1960s to 15.6% in 2005, manufacturing volumes between 1961 and 2005 kept pace with the overall growth in the volume index of GDP. Manufacturing in Canada declined significantly during the Great Recession. As of 2017, manufacturing accounts for 10% of Canada's GDP, a relative decline of more than 5% of GDP since 2005.

Central Canada is home to branch plants to all the major American and Japanese automobile makers and many parts factories owned by Canadian firms such as Magna International and Linamar Corporation.

==== Automotive ====
The automotive industry in Canada consists primarily of assembly plants of foreign automakers, most with headquarters in the United States or Japan, along with hundreds of manufacturers of automotive parts and systems.

Canada is currently the thirteenth-largest auto-producing nation in the world, and seventh largest auto exporter by value, producing 1.4 million vehicles and exporting $32 billion worth of vehicles in 2020. Canada's highest rankings ever were the second-largest producer in the world between 1918 and 1923 and third-largest after World War II.

Automotive manufacturing is one of Canada's largest industrial sectors, accounting for 10% of manufacturing GDP and 23% of manufacturing trade. Canada produces passenger vehicles, trucks and buses, auto parts and systems, truck bodies and trailers, as well as tires and machine, tools, dies and molds (MTDM). The auto industry directly employs more than 125,000 people in vehicle assembly and auto parts manufacturing, and another 380,000 in distribution and aftermarket sales and service.

==== Pharmaceutical ====
The pharmaceutical industry in Canada employs approximately 30,000 people. It supplies about one third of the domestic pharmaceutical consumer market of $27 billion annually. This accounts for ~16% of yearly health expenditures. Canada had a pharmaceutical trade deficit of $8.5 billion in 2018 with exports of $11 billion and imports of $19.5 billion. The majority of large pharmaceutical companies are headquartered in Montreal, Quebec. Both Toronto and Montreal have healthy pharmaceutical industries.

==== Steel ====
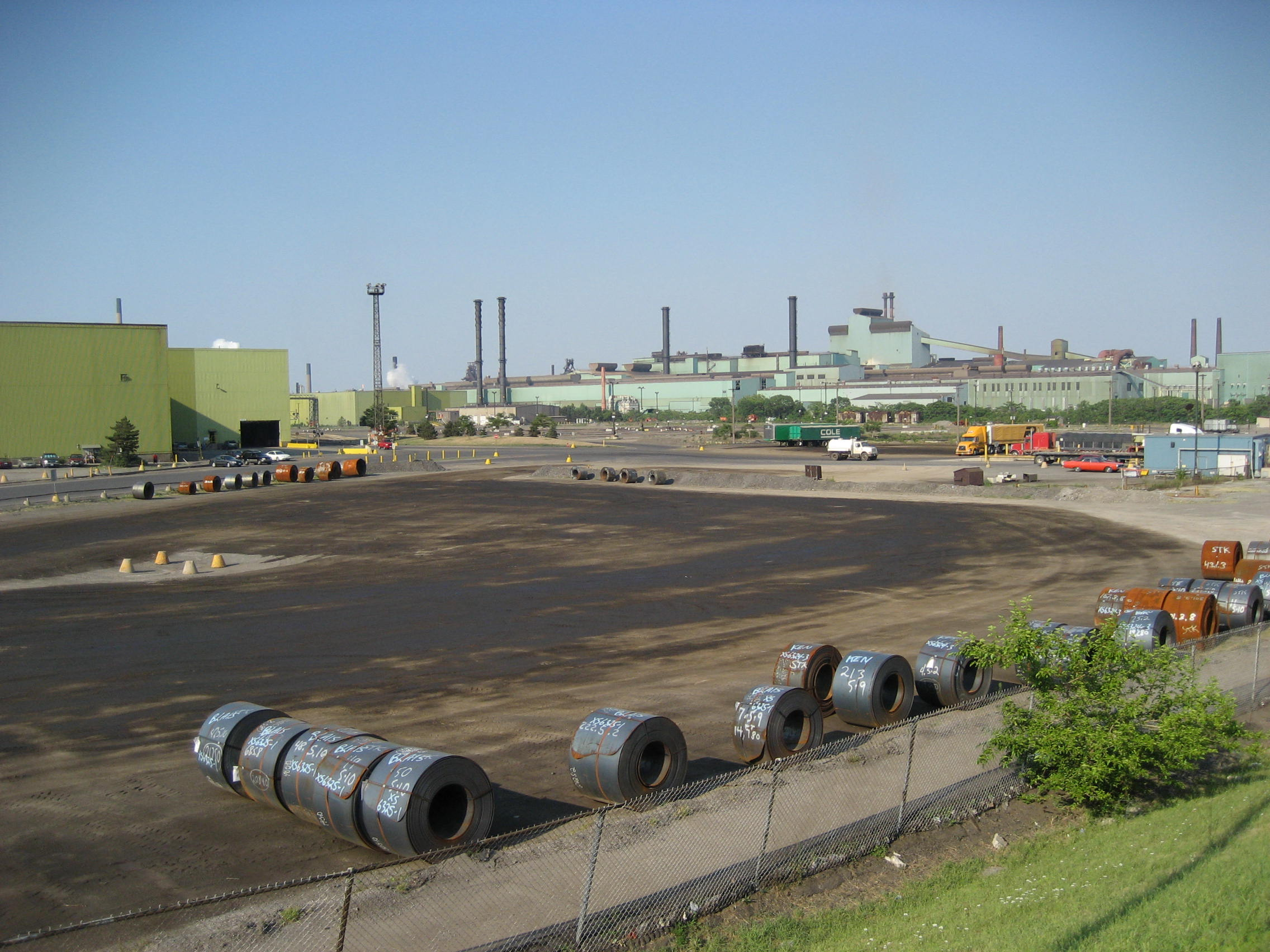
ArcelorMittal Dofasco, view from Burlington Street

Canada was the world's nineteenth-largest steel exporter in 2018. In year-to-date 2019 (through March), further referred to as YTD 2019, Canada exported 1.39 million metric tons of steel, a 22 percent decrease from 1.79 million metric tons in YTD 2018. Based on available data, Canada's exports represented about 1.5 percent of all steel exported globally in 2017. By volume, Canada's 2018 steel exports represented just over one-tenth the volume of the world's largest exporter, China. In value terms, steel represented 1.4 percent of the total goods Canada exported in 2018. The growth in exports in the decade since 2009 has been 29%. The largest producers in 2018 were ArcelorMittal, Essar Steel Algoma, and the first of those alone accounted for roughly half of Canadian steel production through its two subsidiaries. The top two markets for Canada's exports were its NAFTA partners, and by themselves accounted for 92 percent of exports by volume. Canada sent 83 percent of its steel exports to the United States in YTD 2019. The gap between domestic demand and domestic production increased to −2.4 million metric tons, up from −0.2 million metric tons in YTD 2018. In YTD 2019, exports as a share of production decreased to 41.6 percent from 53 percent in YTD 2018.

In 2017, heavy industry accounted for 10.2% of Canada's greenhouse gas emissions.

=== Mining ===
Canada is one of the largest producers of metals (as of 2019):

Metal	World rank	Ref.
Platinum	4	
Gold	5	
Nickel	5	
Copper	10	
Iron (ore)	8	
Titanium	4	
Potash	1	
Niobium	2	
Molybdenum	7	
Cobalt	7	
Lithium	8	
Zinc	8	

In 2019, the country was also the 4th largest world producer of sulfur; the 13th largest world producer of gypsum; the 14th worldwide producer of antimony; the world's 10th largest producer of graphite; in addition to being the 6th largest world producer of salt. It was the 2nd largest producer in the world of uranium in 2018.

=== Energy ===
Canada has access to cheap sources of energy because of its geography. This has enabled the creation of several important industries, such as the large aluminum industries in British Columbia and Quebec. Canada is also one of the world's highest per capita consumers of energy.

==== Electricity ====
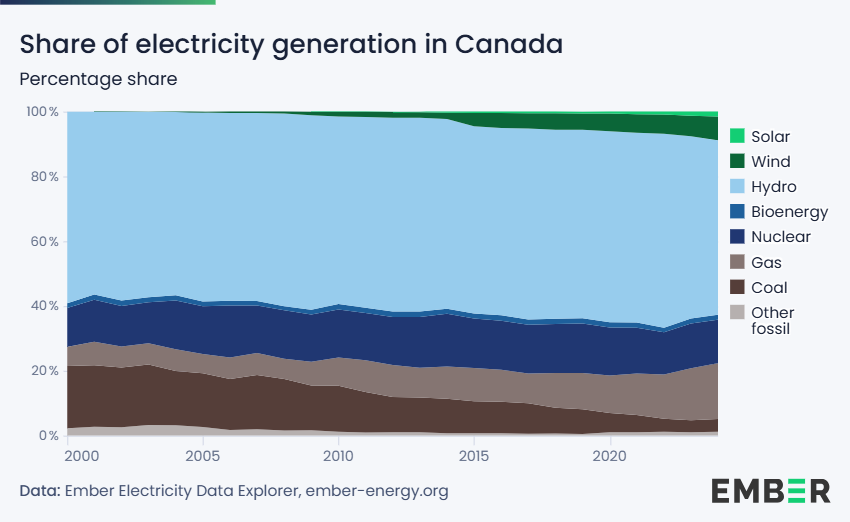
Share of electricity generation in Canada – percentage share

The electricity sector in Canada has played a significant role in the economic and political life of the country since the late 19th century. The sector is organized along provincial and territorial lines. In a majority of provinces, large government-owned integrated public utilities play a leading role in the generation, transmission and distribution of electricity. Ontario and Alberta have created electricity markets in the last decade in order to increase investment and competition in this sector of the economy. In 2017, the electricity sector accounted for 10% of total national greenhouse gas emissions. Canada has substantial electricity trade with the neighbouring United States amounting to 72 TWh exports and 10 TWh imports in 2017.

Hydroelectricity accounted for 59% of all electric generation in Canada in 2016, making Canada the world's second-largest producer of hydroelectricity after China. Since 1960, large hydroelectric projects, especially in Quebec, British Columbia, Manitoba and Newfoundland and Labrador, have significantly increased the country's generation capacity.

The second-largest single source of power (15% of the total) is nuclear power, with several plants in Ontario generating more than half of that province's electricity and one generator in New Brunswick. This makes Canada the world's sixth-largest electricity producer generated by nuclear power, producing 95 TWh in 2017.

Fossil fuels provide 19% of Canadian electric power, about half as coal (9% of the total), and the remainder a mix of natural gas and oil. Only five provinces use coal for electricity generation. Alberta, Saskatchewan, and Nova Scotia rely on coal for nearly half of their generation, while other provinces and territories use little or none. Alberta and Saskatchewan also use a substantial amount of natural gas. Remote communities, including all of Nunavut and much of the Northwest Territories, produce most of their electricity from diesel generators at high economic and environmental costs. The federal government has set up initiatives to reduce dependence on diesel-fired electricity.

Non-hydro renewables are a fast-growing portion of the total, at 7% in 2016.

==== Oil and gas ====
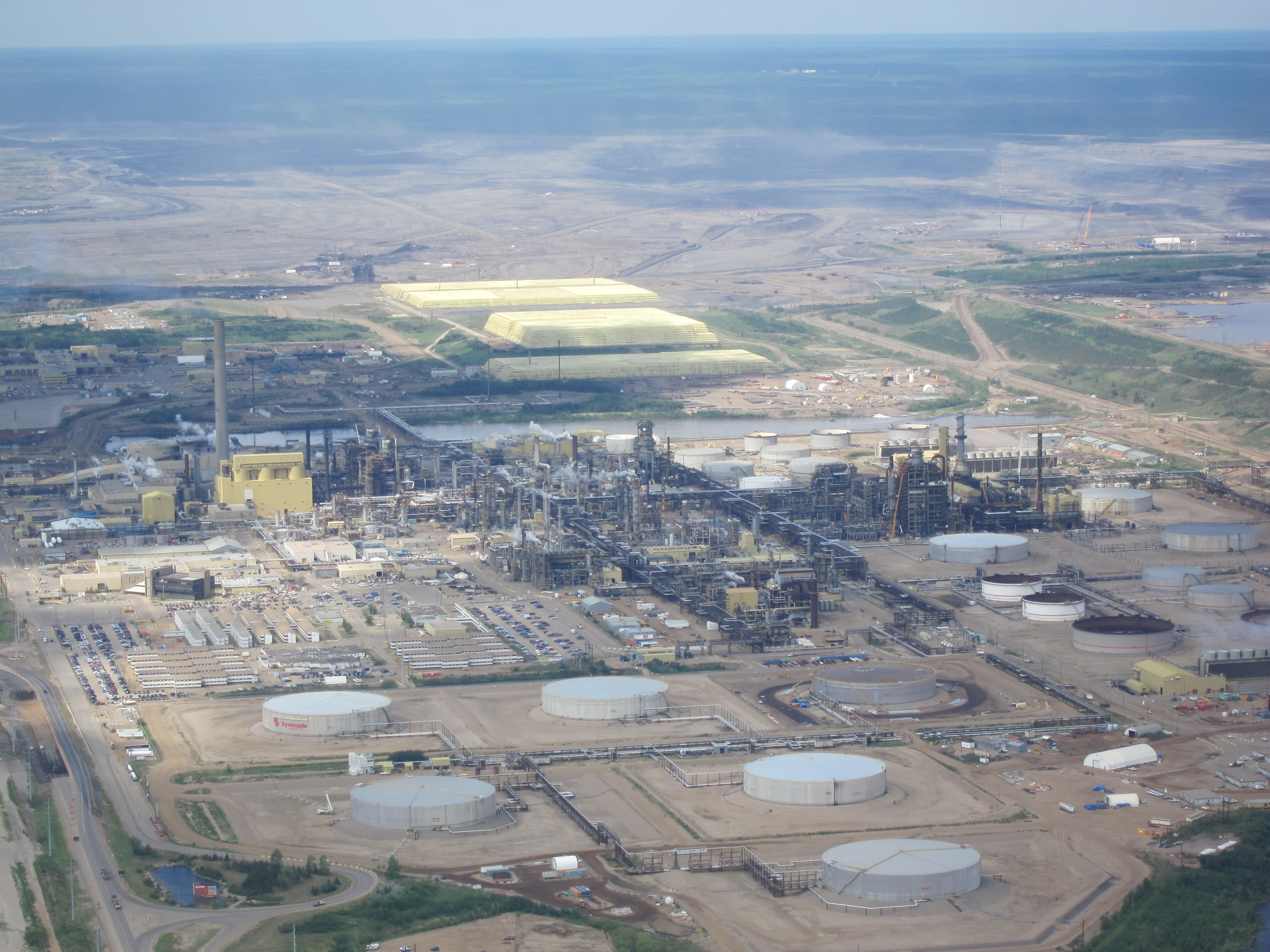
Syncrude's Mildred Lake plant site at the Athabasca oil sands in Alberta

Canada possesses extensive oil and gas resources centred in Alberta, and the Northern Territories but is also present in neighboring British Columbia and Saskatchewan. The vast Athabasca oil sands give Canada the world's third-largest reserves of oil after Saudi Arabia and Venezuela, according to USGS. The oil and gas industry represents 27% of Canada's total greenhouse gas emissions, an increase of 84% since 1990, mostly due to the development of the oil sands.

Historically, an important issue in Canadian politics is the interplay between the oil and energy industry in Western Canada and the industrial heartland of Southern Ontario. Foreign investment in Western oil projects has fueled Canada's rising dollar. This has raised the price of Ontario's manufacturing exports and made them less competitive, a problem similar to the decline of the manufacturing sector in the Netherlands.

The National Energy Policy of the early 1980s attempted to make Canada oil-sufficient and to ensure equal supply and price of oil in all parts of Canada, especially for the eastern manufacturing base. This policy proved deeply divisive as it forced Alberta to sell low-priced oil to eastern Canada. The policy was eliminated 5 years after it was first announced amid a collapse of oil prices in 1985. The new Prime Minister Brian Mulroney had campaigned against the policy in the 1984 Canadian federal election. One of the most controversial sections of the Canada–United States Free Trade Agreement of 1988 was a promise that Canada would never charge the United States more for energy than fellow Canadians.

=== Agriculture, fishing, livestock and forestry ===
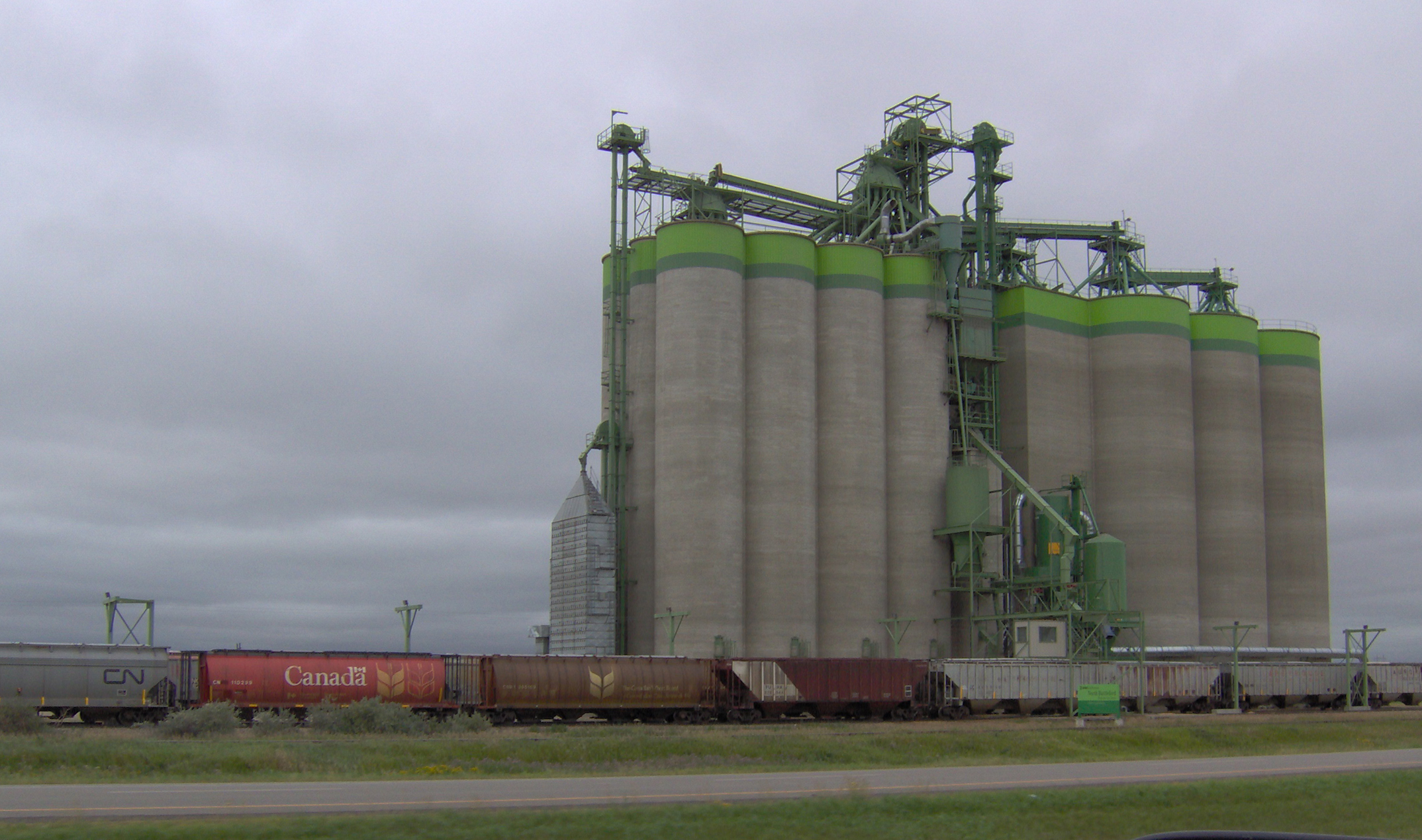
An inland grain terminal along the Yellowhead Highway in Saskatchewan

Canada is one of the world's largest suppliers of agricultural products, particularly wheat and other grains. Canada is a major exporter of agricultural products, to the United States and Asia. As with all other developed nations, the proportion of the population and GDP devoted to agriculture fell dramatically over the 20th century. The agriculture and agri-food manufacturing sector created $49.0 billion to Canada's GDP in 2015, accounting for 2.6% of total GDP. This sector also accounts for 8.4% of Canada's Greenhouse gas emissions.

The Canadian agriculture industry receives significant government subsidies and support as with other developed nations. However, Canada has strongly supported reducing market influencing subsidies through the World Trade Organization. In 2000, Canada spent approximately CDN$4.6 billion on support for the industry. $2.32 billion was classified under the WTO designation of "green box" license, meaning it did not directly influence the market, such as money for research or disaster relief. All but $848.2 million were subsidies worth less than 5% of the value of the crops they were provided for.

== Infrastructure ==
=== Transportation ===
Canada, the world's second-largest country in total area, is dedicated to having efficient, high-capacity multimodal transportation spanning often vast distances between natural resource extraction sites, agricultural and urban areas. Canada's transportation system includes more than 1,400,000 kilometres (870,000 mi) of roads, 10 major international airports, 300 smaller airports, 72,093 km (44,797 mi) of functioning railway track, and more than 300 commercial ports and harbours that provide access to the Pacific, Atlantic and Arctic oceans as well as the Great Lakes and the St. Lawrence Seaway. In 2005, the transportation sector made up 4.2% of Canada's GDP, compared to 3.7% for Canada's mining and oil and gas extraction industries.

Transport Canada oversees and regulates most aspects of transportation within federal jurisdiction, including interprovincial transport. This primarily includes rail, air and maritime transportation. Transport Canada is under the direction of the federal government's Minister of Transport. The Transportation Safety Board of Canada is responsible for maintaining transportation safety in Canada by investigating accidents and making safety recommendations.

=== Water supply and sanitation ===
Canada has nearly universal and generally good quality access to water, but a lack of clean drinking water in many First Nations communities remains a problem. Water use in Canada is high compared to Europe, since water tariffs are low and 44% of users are not metered.

Despite a commitment by the federal government to promote increased cost recovery, only 50% of the cost of maintaining and operating water infrastructure is actually being recovered from users through tariffs, the rest being financed through taxes.

== Science and technology ==
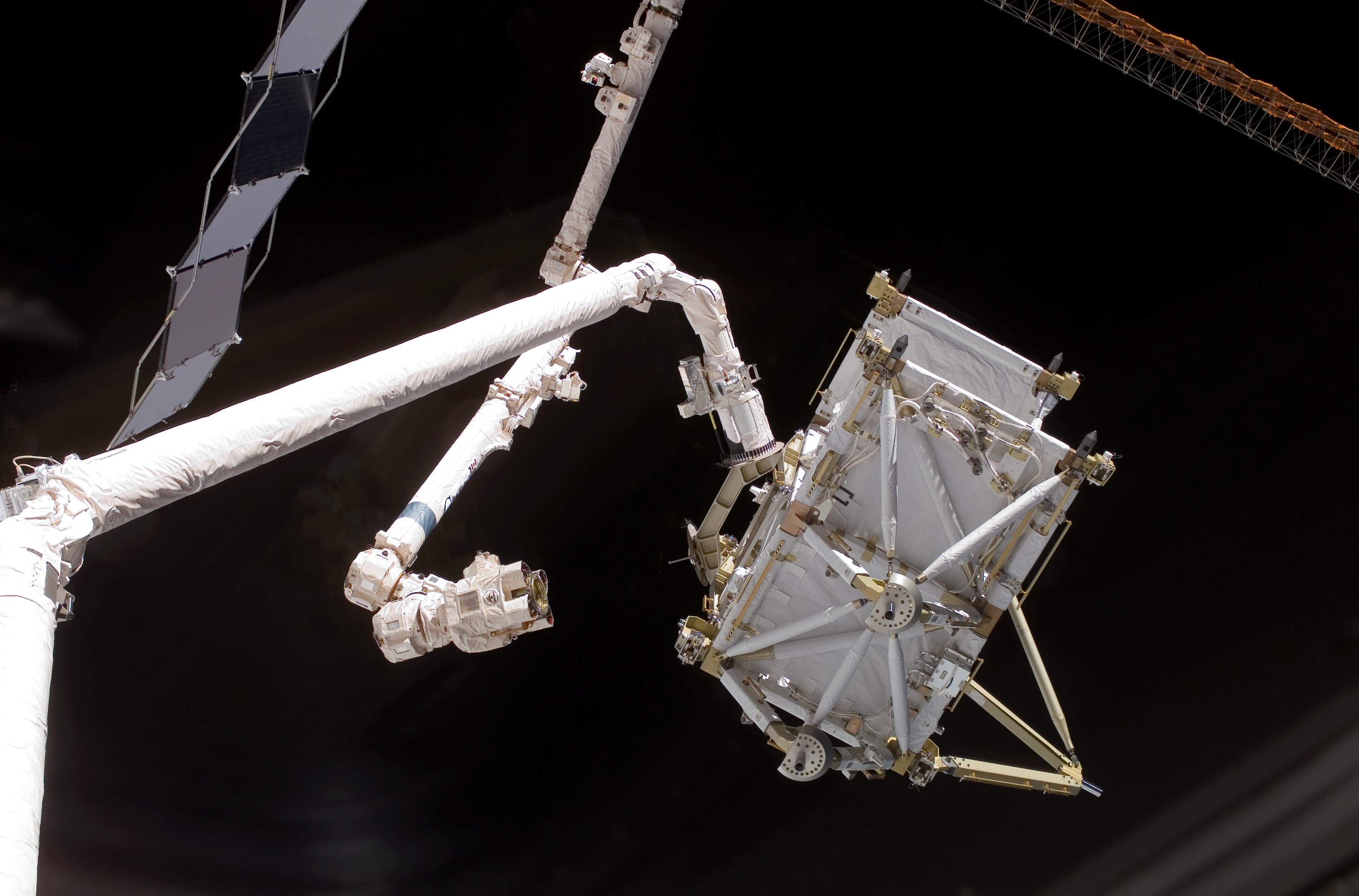
The Canadian-built Space Shuttle robotic arm (left), known as Canadarm, transferred the P5 truss segment over to the Canadian-built space station robotic arm, known as Canadarm2.

In 2019, Canada spent approximately CA$40.3 billion on domestic research and development, of which over $7 billion was provided by the federal and provincial governments. In 2018, Canada spent approximately C$34.5 billion on domestic research and development, of which around $2 billion was spent directly by the federal government in-house and an additional $5.7 billion was provided by provincial and federal sources in the form of grants. This investment corresponds to about 1.57% of Canada's gross domestic product, a decline from 1.72% in 2014. In 2025, Canada was ranked 17th in the Global Innovation Index by the World Intellectual Property Organization, and stepped ahead to the 16th position in 2026.

As of 2020, the country has produced fifteen Nobel laureates in physics, chemistry, and medicine, and was ranked fourth worldwide for scientific research quality in a major 2012 survey of international scientists. It is furthermore home to the headquarters of a number of global technology firms. Canada has one of the highest levels of Internet access in the world, with over 33 million users, equivalent to around 94 percent of its total 2014 population.

Some of the most notable scientific developments in Canada include the creation of the modern alkaline battery and the polio vaccine and discoveries about the interior structure of the atomic nucleus. Other major Canadian scientific contributions include the artificial cardiac pacemaker, mapping the visual cortex, the development of the electron microscope, plate tectonics, deep learning, multi-touch technology and the identification of the first black hole, Cygnus X-1. Canada has a long history of discovery in genetics, which include stem cells, site-directed mutagenesis, T-cell receptor and the identification of the genes that cause Fanconi anemia, cystic fibrosis and early-onset Alzheimer's disease, among numerous other diseases.

The Canadian Space Agency operates a highly active space program, conducting deep-space, planetary, and aviation research, and developing rockets and satellites. Canada was the third country to design and construct a satellite after the Soviet Union and the United States, with the 1962 Alouette 1 launch. Canada is a participant in the International Space Station (ISS), and is a pioneer in space robotics, having constructed the Canadarm, Canadarm2 and Dextre robotic manipulators for the ISS and NASA's Space Shuttle. Since the 1960s, Canada's aerospace industry has designed and built numerous marques of satellite, including Radarsat-1 and 2, ISIS and MOST. Canada has also produced one of the world's most successful and widely used sounding rockets, the Black Brant; over 1,000 Black Brants have been launched since the rocket's introduction in 1961.

== Foreign trade ==
Exports of Canada by product category (2019) Chemical products Transportation Machines Mineral products Plastics and rubbers Metals Foodstuffs Precious metals Textiles Instruments Animal products Vegetable products Paper goods Footwear and headwear Miscellaneous Stone and glass Wood products Animal and vegetable bi-products Animal hides Arts and antiques Weapons

=== Free-trade agreements ===
Canada Free-trade areas

==== Free-trade agreements in force ====
- Canada–Israel Free Trade Agreement (Entered into force January 1, 1997, modernization ongoing)
- Canada–Chile Free Trade Agreement (Entered into force July 5, 1997)
- Canada–Costa Rica Free Trade Agreement (Entered into force November 1, 2002, modernization ongoing)
- Canada–European Free Trade Association Free Trade Agreement (Iceland, Norway, Switzerland and Liechtenstein; entered into force July 1, 2009)
- Canada–Peru Free Trade Agreement (Entered into force August 1, 2009)
- Canada–Colombia Free Trade Agreement (Signed November 21, 2008, entered into force August 15, 2011; Canada's ratification of this FTA had been dependent upon Colombia's ratification of the "Agreement Concerning Annual Reports on Human Rights and Free Trade Between Canada and the Republic of Colombia" signed on May 27, 2010)
- Canada–Jordan Free Trade Agreement (Signed on June 28, 2009, entered into force October 1, 2012)
- Canada–Panama Free Trade Agreement (Signed on May 14, 2010, entered into force April 1, 2013)
- Canada–South Korea Free Trade Agreement (Signed on March 11, 2014, entered into force January 1, 2015)
- Canada–Ukraine Free Trade Agreement (Signed July 11, 2016, entered into force August 1, 2017)
- Comprehensive Economic and Trade Agreement with the European Union (EU) (signed October 30, 2016, entered into force September 21, 2017)
- Comprehensive and Progressive Agreement for Trans-Pacific Partnership (signed March 8, 2018, entered into force December 30, 2018)
- Canada–United States–Mexico Agreement (signed November 30, 2018, entered into force July 1, 2020)
- Canada–UK Trade Continuity Agreement (signed December 9, 2020, entered into force April 1, 2021)
- Canada-Indonesia Comprehensive Economic Partnership Agreement (CEPA) (signed September 24, 2025)

==== Free-trade agreements no longer in force ====
- Canada–U.S. Free Trade Agreement (signed October 12, 1987, entered into force January 1, 1989, later superseded by NAFTA)
- Trans-Pacific Partnership (concluded October 5, 2015, superseded by CPTPP)
- North American Free Trade Agreement (entered into force January 1, 1994, later superseded by USMCA)

==== Ongoing free-trade agreements negotiations ====
Canada is negotiating bilateral FTAs with the following countries respectively trade blocs:

- Caribbean Community (CARICOM)
- Guatemala, Nicaragua and El Salvador
- Dominican Republic
- India
- Japan
- Morocco
- Singapore
- Andean Community (FTA's are already in force with Peru and Colombia)

Canada has been involved in negotiations to create the following regional trade blocks:

- Canada and Central American Free Trade Agreement
- Free Trade Area of the Americas (FTAA)

== Government policies and finance ==
The Canadian federal budget is presented annually by the Government of Canada to identify planned government spending and expected government revenue, and to forecast economic conditions for the upcoming fiscal year. Federal budgets are presented in the fall by the minister of finance. Before 2025, federal budgets were released in the spring.

=== Political issues ===
==== Canada–United States trade relations ====
Canada and the United States share a common trading relationship. Canada's job market continues to perform well along with the US, reaching a 30-year low in the unemployment rate in December 2006, following 14 consecutive years of employment growth.

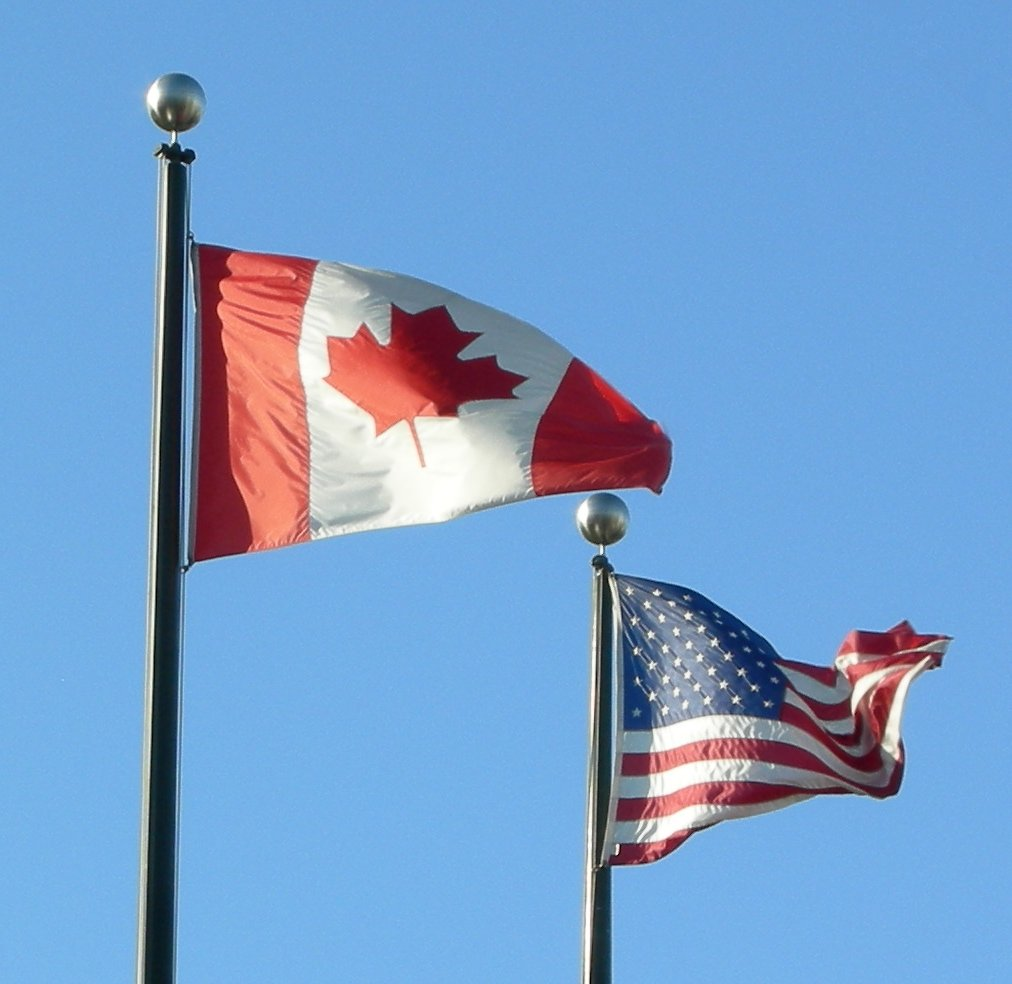
Flags of Canada and the United States

The United States is by far Canada's largest trading partner, with more than $1.7 billion CAD in trade per day in 2005. In 2009, 73% of Canada's exports went to the United States, and 63% of Canada's imports were from the United States. Trade with Canada makes up 23% of the United States' exports and 17% of its imports. By comparison, in 2005 this was more than U.S. trade with all countries in the European Union combined, and well over twice U.S. trade with all the countries of Latin America combined. Just the two-way trade that crosses the Ambassador Bridge between Michigan and Ontario equals all U.S. exports to Japan. Canada's importance to the United States is not just a border-state phenomenon: Canada is the leading export market for 35 of 50 U.S. states, and is the United States' largest foreign supplier of energy.

Bilateral trade increased by 52% between 1989, when the U.S.–Canada Free Trade Agreement (FTA) went into effect, and 1994, when the North American Free Trade Agreement (NAFTA) superseded it. Trade has since increased by 40%. NAFTA continues the FTA's moves toward reducing trade barriers and establishing agreed-upon trade rules. It also resolves some long-standing bilateral irritants and liberalizes rules in several areas, including agriculture, services, energy, financial services, investment, and government procurement. NAFTA forms the largest trading area in the world, embracing the 405 million people of the three North American countries.

The largest component of U.S.–Canada trade is in the energy sector.

The U.S. is Canada's largest agricultural export market, taking well over half of all Canadian food exports. Nearly two-thirds of Canada's forest products, including pulp and paper, are exported to the United States; 72% of Canada's total newsprint production also is exported to the U.S.

At $73.6 billion in 2004, U.S.-Canada trade in energy is the largest U.S. energy trading relationship, with the overwhelming majority ($66.7 billion) being exports from Canada. The primary components of U.S. energy trade with Canada are petroleum, natural gas, and electricity. Canada is the United States' largest oil supplier and the fifth-largest energy producing country in the world. Canada provides about 16% of U.S. oil imports and 14% of total U.S. consumption of natural gas. The United States and Canada's national electricity grids are linked, and both countries share hydropower facilities on the western borders.

While most of U.S.-Canada trade flows smoothly, there are occasionally bilateral trade disputes, particularly in the agricultural and cultural fields. Usually these issues are resolved through bilateral consultative forums or referral to World Trade Organization (WTO) or NAFTA dispute resolution. In May 1999, the U.S. and Canadian governments negotiated an agreement on magazines that provides increased access for the U.S. publishing industry to the Canadian market. The United States and Canada also have resolved several major issues involving fisheries. By common agreement, the two countries submitted a Gulf of Maine boundary dispute to the International Court of Justice in 1981; both accepted the court's October 12, 1984, ruling which demarcated the territorial sea boundary. A current issue between the United States and Canada is the ongoing softwood lumber dispute, as the U.S. alleges that Canada unfairly subsidizes its forestry industry.

In 1990, the United States and Canada signed a bilateral Fisheries Enforcement Agreement, which has served to deter illegal fishing activity and reduce the risk of injury during fisheries enforcement incidents. The U.S. and Canada signed a Pacific Salmon Agreement in June 1999 that settled differences over implementation of the 1985 Pacific Salmon Treaty for the next decade.

Canada and the United States signed an aviation agreement during Bill Clinton's visit to Canada in February 1995, and air traffic between the two countries has increased dramatically as a result. The two countries also share in operation of the St. Lawrence Seaway, connecting the Great Lakes to the Atlantic Ocean.

The U.S. remains Canada's largest foreign investor and the most popular destination for Canadian foreign investments. In 2018, the stock of U.S. direct investment in Canada totaled $406 billion, while the stock of Canadian investment in the U.S. totaled $595 billion, or 46% of the overall CDIA stock for 2018. This made Canada the second largest investing country in the U.S. for 2018 US investments are primarily directed at Canada's mining and smelting industries, petroleum, chemicals, the manufacture of machinery and transportation equipment, and finance, while Canadian investment in the United States is concentrated in manufacturing, wholesale trade, real estate, petroleum, finance, insurance and other services.

==== Corruption ====
Corruption in Canada is the use of political power for private gain by Canadian government officials.

Canada had the distinction of being the least corrupt government in the Americas in 2023, as measured by the Corruption Perceptions Index. Conflicts of interest within government, tax evasion, and the prevalence of money laundering in areas such as British Columbia are among the leading factors of corruption in Canada.

Canada ranks at the bottom of the bribery-fighting rankings with "little or no enforcement of anti-bribery measures". The 2014 Ernst & Young global fraud survey found that "twenty percent of Canadian executives believe bribery and corruption are widespread in this country".

==== Immigration ====
The economic impact of immigration to Canada is dominated by two conflicting narratives: higher immigration levels increase GDP but decrease GDP per capita or living standards for the resident population and lead to diseconomies of scale in terms of overcrowding of hospitals, schools and recreational facilities, deteriorating environment, increase in cost of services, and an increase in cost of housing. A commonly supported argument is that impact of immigration on GDP is not an effective metric for immigration. Another narrative regarding immigration is the replacement of the aging workforce. However, some economists note that increasing immigration rates is not an entirely effective strategy to counter it. Increased immigration numbers and the resulting surge in housing prices significantly contributed to the rise of inflation in 2021 to an 18-year high, while the immigration caps introduced in 2025 have been linked to increasing housing affordability through a positive drop in average asking monthly rents, ranging from 2 to 8 percent in several major cities.

Canada is one of the top Western countries in terms of per capita immigrant acceptance. The per capita immigration rate to Canada has been relatively constant since the 1950s. However, in the first and second decades of the 21st century, there was a steady increase in the education and skill level of immigrants to Canada. This was due to the focus on higher average productivity-based applicants, resulting in immigrants to Canada being, on average, better educated than Canadians. This trend was enhanced for income redistribution in the third decade of the 21st century by opening low-skilled immigrant pathways with minimal immigration score requirements to reach a target of 400,000 immigrants annually. This has cemented a new narrative on immigration: immigration is to fill low-skilled jobs and alleviate competitive labor market pressures faced by businesses that use cheap labor. Starting in 2022, the Trudeau government has set immigration targets influenced by the Century Initiative's lobbying. Over a million immigrants were targeted in 2022, followed by 465,000 immigrants in 2023, 485,000 immigrants in 2024, and a projection of 500,000 immigrants in 2025. Across Canada, people have been asking the government to match affordable housing to the set immigration levels, while the government annually welcomes 500,000 new permanent residents, and more than 800,000 foreign nationals into the country on study visas, as asylum seekers, and on temporary work visas. A Canadian journalist highlighted the poor preparedness for receiving immigrants in swathes, pointing to Canada's historic need for a "servant class" and "cheap labor" for the bourgeoisie and the owning class. Furthermore, the journalist observed that Canada's failure to address or neutralize the social and professional barriers for immigrants suggests it is not as welcoming as it purports to be. This policy of inaction silently perpetuates the creation of a servant class within the country's diverse mosaic. As a part of the process, by default, the government systematically forces a majority of immigrants into vulnerable positions and economic disenfranchisement.

An article by an ex-policy maker states that Canada is rooting for the low-wage-low-productivity model of competitiveness that it has been locked in since the mid-1980s with the immigration targets, a problematic approach according to Paul Krugman in the long term, and which the ex-policy maker also endorses by stating that throwing more cheap labor at problems without a significant increase in productivity will affect a country's ability to improve its standard of living over time. Some economists also warn that sustaining low productivity and the permanent integration of low-skilled temporary residents or foreign workers would lead to forced tax increases to manage associated government costs. The article further observes that it is imperative that Canada and the "government for the people" require a fundamental re-commitment to pre-1970s dominating national objective and efforts for a steady improvement in raising the living standard of Canadians by embracing the supply and demand concept of labor economics, and improving the economic efficiency of the system. A former director from Quebec's Ministry of Immigration observed that the government needs to treat people better, as their lives and families' futures are at stake.

==== Taxation ====
Taxation in Canada involves the assessment and collection of taxes at each level of government, including federally, provincially and territorially, and locally. The collection of federal, provincial and territorial income taxes is mainly administered by the federal government through the Canada Revenue Agency, which then remits the provincial and territorial shares to the relevant provinces and territories. The exception is Quebec, where Revenu Québec administers the collection of provincial income tax.

Taxes are levied on various income sources, including income, payroll, property, sales, capital gains, dividends, imports, among others; various fees are additionally imposed. As of 2024, taxes collected at the federal, provincial and territorial, and local levels of government amounted to 34.9% of the country's total GDP, above the OECD average of 34.1% of GDP.

The income tax policy of Canada is based on the progressive model of taxation, with individuals and businesses paying a higher percentage of tax as the amount of income earned increases.

=== Welfare ===
Social programs in Canada (French: programmes sociaux) include all Canadian government programs designed to give assistance to citizens outside of what the market provides. The Canadian social safety net includes a broad spectrum of programs, many of which are run by the provinces and territories. Canada also has a wide range of government transfer payments to individuals, which totaled $176.6 billion in 2009—this cost only includes social programs that administer funds to individuals; programs such as medicare and public education are additional costs.

=== Income and poverty ===
Under the Constitution of Canada, the responsibility for enacting and enforcing labour laws, including the minimum wage, rests primarily with the ten Provinces of Canada. The three Territories of Canada have a similar power, delegated to them by federal legislation. Some provinces allow lower wages to be paid to liquor servers and other gratuity earners or to inexperienced employees.

The Government of Canada has the constitutional authority to set minimum wages only for employees within federal jurisdiction, such as federal public servants and workers in industries that are under federal regulatory jurisdiction, such as banks, airlines and interprovincial railways. The federal government earlier set its own minimum wage rates for workers under its jurisdiction. In 1996, however, the federal minimum wage was redefined to be the general adult minimum wage rate of the province or territory where the work is performed. Following the 2021 budget, the Government of Canada reestablished a federal minimum wage for federally regulated industries on December 29, 2021.

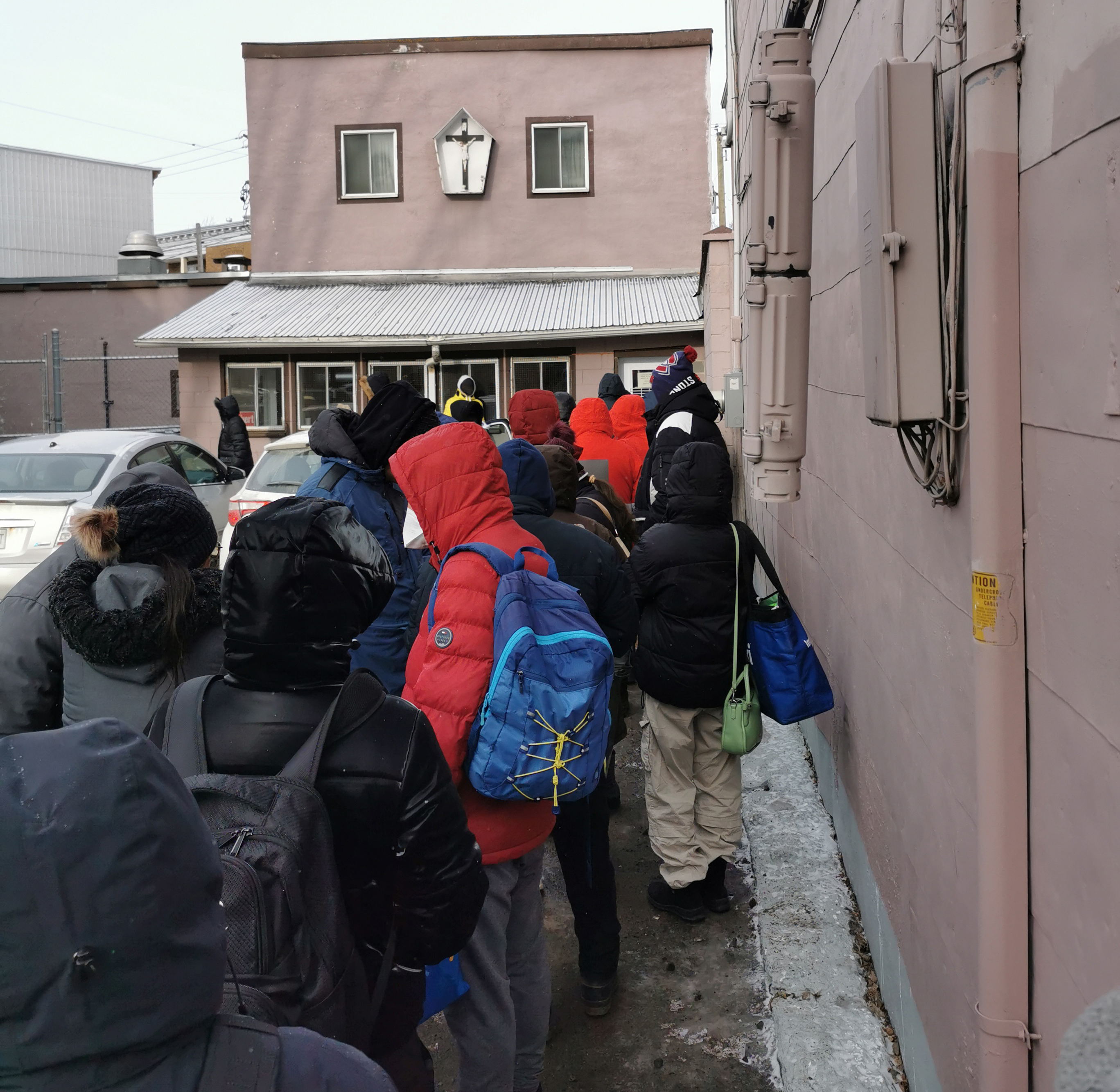
Unemployed people lining up outside a community soup kitchen in Quebec City

Poverty in Canada refers to the state or condition in which a person or household lacks essential resources—financial or otherwise—to maintain a modest standard of living in their community.

Researchers and governments have used different metrics to measure poverty in Canada including Low-Income Cut-Off (LICO), Low Income Measure (LIM), and Market Basket Measure (MBM). In November 2018, Employment and Social Development Canada announced the establishment of Canada's first Official Poverty Line to be based on the MBM. The MBM considers the cost of a basket of basic goods and services needed by a family of two adults and two children to maintain a modest standard of living.

There was an increase in poverty in Canada and many other industrial nations in the 1980s. By 2008, Canada's poverty rate was among the highest of Organisation for Economic Co-operation and Development (OECD) member nations—the wealthiest countries in the world.

The number of people living below the official poverty line decreased substantially from 14.5% in 2015 to 10.1% in 2019, and 6.4% in 2020.

Child poverty in Canada declined since 2015, with the number of children who were living in poverty decreasing 71% by 2020. Child poverty has a disproportionately high effect on Indigenous households in Canada. According to a 2019 study by researchers at the Assembly of First Nations and the Canadian Centre for Policy Alternatives (CCPA), nearly 50% of Indigenous children in Canada—both on and off reserve—were living in poverty.

As of 2020, about 2.4 million Canadians, or 6.4% of the population, lived below the poverty line, according to Statistics Canada Canadian Income Survey, 2020 released on March 23, 2022.

=== Debt ===
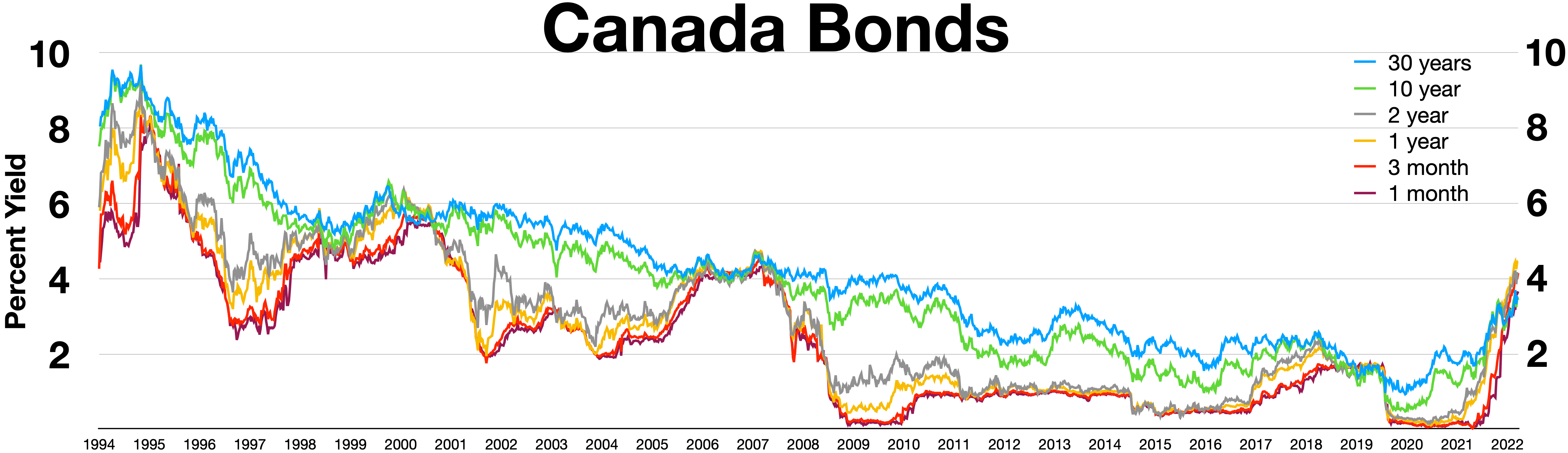
Canada bonds Inverted yield curve in 2006–2007 and 2019 30 year 10 year 2 year 1 year 3 month 1 month

==== Canadian government debt ====
Canadian government debt, also called Canada's public debt, is the liabilities of the government sector. For 2019 (the fiscal year ending March 31, 2020), total financial liabilities or gross debt was $2.434 trillion for the consolidated Canadian general government (federal, provincial, territorial, and local governments combined). This corresponds to 105.3% as a ratio of GDP (GDP was $2.311 trillion). Of the $2.434 trillion, $1.146 trillion or 47% was federal (central) government liabilities (49.6% as a ratio of GDP). Provincial government liabilities comprise most of the remaining liabilities.

==== Household debt ====
Household debt, the amount of money that all adults in the household owe financial institutions, includes consumer debt and mortgage loans. In March 2015, the International Monetary Fund reported that Canada's high household debt was one of two vulnerable domestic areas in Canada's economy; the second is its overheated housing market.

According to Statistics Canada, total household credit as of July 2019 was CAD$2.2 trillion. According to Philip Cross of the Fraser Institute, in May 2015, while the Canadian household debt-to-income ratio is similar to that in the US, however lending standards in Canada are tighter than those in the United States to protect against high-risk borrowers taking out unsustainable debt.

== Green economy ==
Green economy policies in Canada are policies that contribute to transitioning the Canadian economy to a more environmentally sustainable one. The green economy can be defined as an economy, "that results in improved human well-being and social equity, while significantly reducing environmental risks and ecological scarcities." Aspects of a green economy would include stable growth in income and employment that is driven by private and public investment into policies and actions that reduce carbon emissions, pollution and prevent the loss of biodiversity.

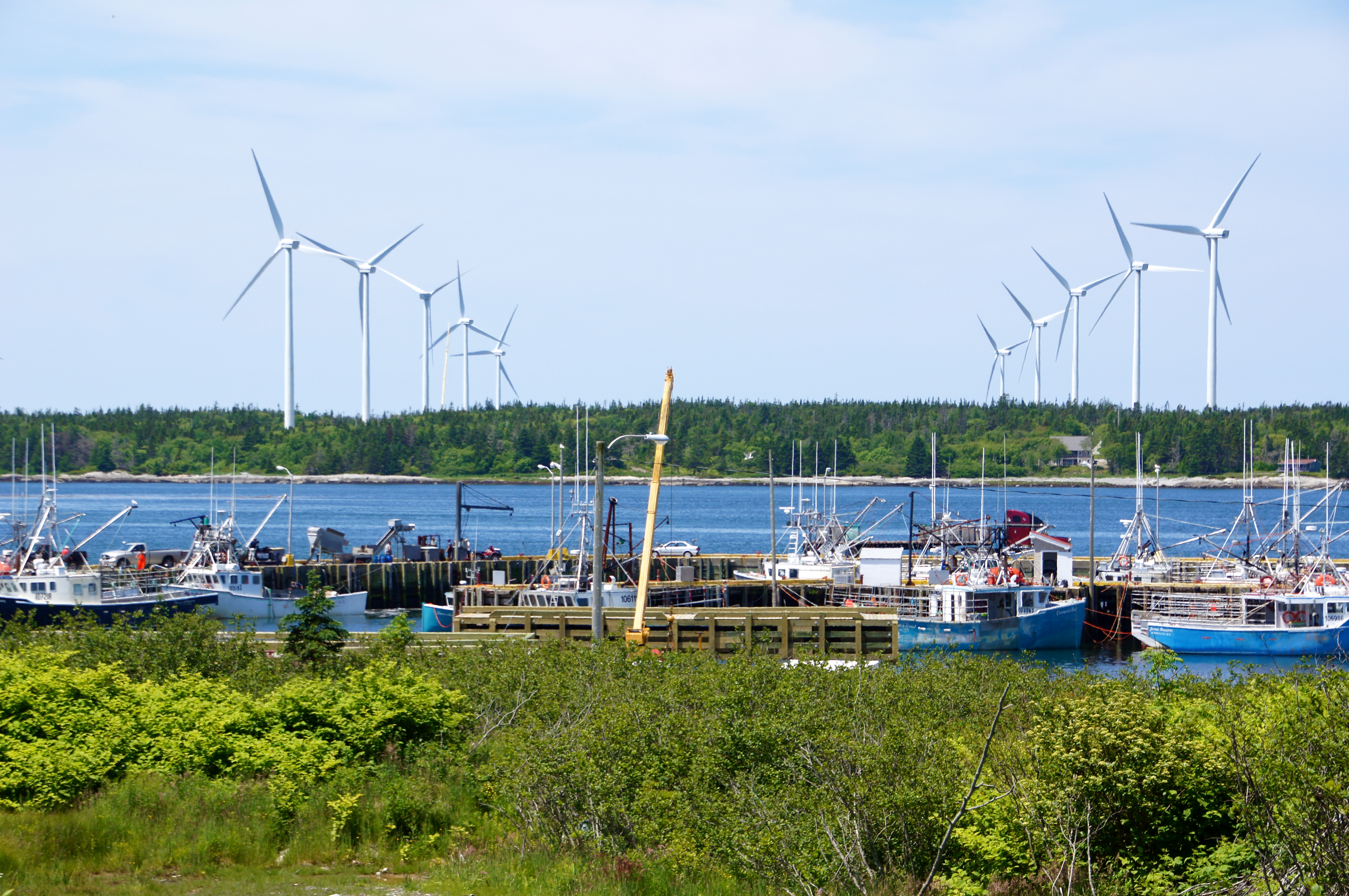
Wind turbines in Nova Scotia

Green economy policies can be defined as legislation or actions put forth by public institutions with the main intent of further establishing an environmentally sustainable system. Some of these policies would include investments into green energy sectors aimed at reducing carbon emissions, and aiding the growth of renewable energy resources. Green economy policies can also be considered on an international scale, with agreements such as the Kyoto Protocol and the Paris Agreement. Policies on a national level include, agreements such as the Western Climate Initiative, and the Boreal Forest Agreement among many others.

Green economy policies have become popular across various public jurisdictions in Canada. There has been an implementation of policies and initiatives across various levels of government. Due to the rise in frequency of these green economy policies in Canada, the socio-technical landscape is changing. More Canadians are supportive of green energy policies and a transition into a green economy.

== Raw data ==
The following table shows the main economic indicators in 1980–2021 (with IMF staff estimates for 2022–2027). Inflation below 5% is in green.

Year	GDP (in Bil. US$PPP)	GDP per capita (in US$ PPP)	GDP (in Bil. US$nominal)	GDP per capita (in US$ nominal)	GDP growth (real)	Inflation rate (in Percent)	Unemployment (in Percent)	Government debt (in % of GDP)
1980	288.7	11,798.2	276.1	11,281.4	▲2.2%	▲10.2%	7.5%	44.6%
1981	▲327.1	▲13,197.5	▲307.2	▲12,396.7	▲3.5%	▲12.5%	▲7.6%	▲46.1%
1982	▲336.2	▲13,404.9	▲314.6	▲12,543.9	▼-3.2%	▲10.8%	▲11.1%	▲51.7%
1983	▲358.5	▲14,149.5	▲341.9	▲13,493.2	▲2.6%	▲5.8%	▲12.0%	▲57.2%
1984	▲393.4	▲15,380.2	▲356.7	▲13,947.4	▲5.9%	▲4.3%	▼11.4%	▲60.2%
1985	▲425.0	▲16,466.0	▲366.2	▲14,185.9	▲4.7%	▲4.0%	▼10.5%	▲65.2%
1986	▲442.9	▲16,990.4	▲379.0	▲14,539.8	▲2.1%	▲4.2%	▼9.6%	▲69.3%
1987	▲472.3	▲17,893.0	▲433.1	▲16,408.1	▲4.1%	▲4.4%	▼8.8%	▲69.8%
1988	▲510.6	▲19,085.3	▲509.4	▲19,041.2	▲4.4%	▲4.0%	▼7.8%	▼69.7%
1989	▲542.9	▲19,947.7	▲567.2	▲20,842.5	▲2.3%	▲5.0%	▼7.5%	▲71.0%
1990	▲564.1	▲20,415.1	▲596.1	▲21,572.1	▲0.2%	▲4.8%	▲8.2%	▲73.7%
1991	▲571.0	▼20,403.3	▲612.5	▲21,885.6	▼-2.1%	▲5.6%	▲10.3%	▲81.7%
1992	▲589.3	▲20,805.6	▼594.4	▼20,984.8	▲0.9%	▲1.5%	▲11.2%	▲88.2%
1993	▲619.3	▲21,615.6	▼579.1	▼20,210.5	▲2.7%	▲1.9%	▲11.4%	▲94.7%
1994	▲661.0	▲22,823.8	▲579.9	▼20,024.6	▲4.5%	▲0.2%	▼10.4%	▲97.5%
1995	▲693.0	▲23,682.4	▲605.9	▲20,706.7	▲2.7%	▲2.1%	▼9.5%	▲100.1%
1996	▲717.1	▲24,252.2	▲630.6	▲21,325.7	▲1.6%	▲1.6%	▲9.6%	▲100.2%
1997	▲760.7	▲25,469.8	▲655.0	▲21,930.5	▲4.3%	▲1.6%	▼9.1%	▼95.3%
1998	▲799.3	▲26,532.4	▼634.0	▼21,046.6	▲3.9%	▲1.0%	▼8.3%	▼93.3%
1999	▲852.4	▲28,068.8	▲678.4	▲22,340.6	▲5.2%	▲1.7%	▼7.6%	▼89.0%
2000	▲916.8	▲29,914.7	▲744.6	▲24,296.7	▲5.2%	▲2.7%	▼6.8%	▼80.4%
2001	▲954.2	▲30,810.5	▼739.0	▼23,859.7	▲1.8%	▲2.5%	▲7.2%	▲81.5%
2002	▲998.4	▲31,887.8	▲760.1	▲24,279.2	▲3.0%	▲2.3%	▲7.7%	▼79.6%
2003	▲1,036.4	▲32,794.3	▲895.6	▲28,338.7	▲1.8%	▲2.8%	▼7.6%	▼75.9%
2004	▲1,097.1	▲34,390.0	▲1,026.5	▲32,176.6	▲3.1%	▲1.9%	▼7.2%	▼71.9%
2005	▲1,167.7	▲36,260.7	▲1,173.5	▲36,439.6	▲3.2%	▲2.2%	▼6.8%	▼70.6%
2006	▲1,235.5	▲37,980.7	▲1,319.4	▲40,558.9	▲2.6%	▲2.0%	▼6.3%	▼69.9%
2007	▲1,295.2	▲39,428.2	▲1,468.9	▲44,717.0	▲2.1%	▲2.1%	▼6.1%	▼66.9%
2008	▲1,333.3	▲40,159.1	▲1,552.9	▲46,773.8	▲1.0%	▲2.4%	▲6.2%	▲67.9%
2009	▼1,302.5	▼38,788.0	▼1,376.5	▼40,990.6	▼-2.9%	▲0.3%	▲8.4%	▲79.3%
2010	▲1,358.9	▲40,017.6	▲1,617.3	▲47,627.3	▲3.1%	▲1.8%	▼8.1%	▲81.2%
2011	▲1,430.8	▲41,716.4	▲1,793.3	▲52,285.9	▲3.1%	▲2.9%	▼7.6%	▲81.8%
2012	▲1,468.1	▲42,351.1	▲1,828.4	▲52,744.0	▲1.8%	▲1.5%	▼7.4%	▲85.4%
2013	▲1,554.1	▲44,360.4	▲1,846.6	▼52,708.6	▲2.3%	▲0.9%	▼7.1%	▲86.1%
2014	▲1,621.4	▲45,812.0	▼1,805.8	▼51,020.8	▲2.9%	▲1.9%	▼7.0%	▼85.6%
2015	▼1,594.9	▼44,702.5	▼1,556.5	▼43,626.5	▲0.7%	▲1.1%	▼6.9%	▲91.2%
2016	▲1,678.4	▲46,554.1	▼1,528.0	▼42,382.6	▲1.0%	▲1.4%	▲7.1%	▲91.8%
2017	▲1,776.9	▲48,688.1	▲1,649.3	▲45,192.0	▲3.0%	▲1.6%	▼6.4%	▼88.9%
2018	▲1,869.8	▲50,531.6	▲1,725.3	▲46,625.9	▲2.8%	▲2.3%	▼5.9%	88.9%
2019	▲1,939.0	▲51,652.6	▲1,742.0	▼46,404.0	▲1.9%	▲1.9%	▼5.8%	▼87.2%
2020	▼1,859.7	▼48,946.8	▼1,645.4	▼43,306.6	▼-5.2%	▲0.7%	▲9.6%	▲117.8%
2021	▲2,025.0	▲52,973.0	▲1,988.3	▲52,015.1	▲4.5%	▲3.4%	▼7.4%	▼112.9%
2022	▲2,240.4	▲57,827.5	▲2,200.4	▲56,794.0	▲3.3%	▲6.9%	▼5.3%	▼102.2%
2023	▲2,353.9	▲59,872.2	▲2,326.6	▲59,179.0	▲1.5%	▲4.2%	▲5.9%	▼98.7%
2024	▲2,441.8	▲61,274.7	▲2,420.7	▲60,745.3	▲1.6%	▲2.4%	▲6.2%	▼96.3%
2025	▲2,544.9	▲63,042.6	▲2,531.2	▲62,703.5	▲2.3%	▲1.9%	▼6.1%	▼93.3%
2026	▲2,642.5	▲64,649.4	▲2,630.3	▲64,352.5	▲1.9%	▲1.9%	▼6.0%	▼90.9%
2027	▲2,739.4	▲66,221.6	▲2,728.4	▲65,954.5	▲1.7%	▲2.0%	6.0%	▼88.7%

=== Unemployment and participation rate ===
Province	Unemployment rate percentage of labour force as of April 2025	Participation Rate	Employment
Alberta	▼7.1%	▼68.5%	2,565,800
British Columbia	▲6.2%	▼65.1%	2,950,900
Manitoba	▲5.3%	▼66.4%	736,000
Newfoundland and Labrador	▼9.6%	▲58.3%	248,100
New Brunswick	▼6.9%	▼59.8%	400,400
Nova Scotia	▲7.2%	▼61.0%	516,400
Ontario	▲7.8%	▼65.0%	8,195,200
Prince Edward Island	▼6.6%	▲65.9%	94,300
Quebec	▲6.0%	▲65.3%	4,645,600
Saskatchewan	▼4.3%	▼66.8%	616,000
Canada (national)	▲6.9%	▼65.3%	20,969,300

=== Export trade ===
Export trade from Canada measured in US dollars. In 2021, Canada exported US$503.4 billion.

That dollar amount reflects a 19.5% gain since 2017 and a 29.1% increase from 2020 to 2021.

Partner	Value	Fraction
United States	$380.4 billion	75.6%
China	$23 billion	4.6%
United Kingdom	$12.9 billion	2.6%
Japan	$11.5 billion	2.3%
Mexico	$6.5 billion	1.3%
Germany	$5.5 billion	1.1%
South Korea	$4.5 billion	0.9%
Netherlands	$3.8 billion	0.8%
France	$3.2 billion	0.6%
Belgium	$3.0 billion	0.6%
Hong Kong	$2.8 billion	0.6%
Norway	$2.5 billion	0.5%
Switzerland	$1.6 billion	0.5%
India	$2.35 billion	0.5%
Italy	$2.1 billion	0.4%

=== Import trade ===
Import trade in 2017 measured in US dollars.

Partner	Value	Fraction
United States	$222.0 billion	51.3%
China	$54.7 billion	12.7%
Mexico	$27.4 billion	6.3%
Germany	$13.8 billion	3.2%
Japan	$13.5 billion	3.1%
United Kingdom	$6.9 billion	1.6%
South Korea	$6.7 billion	1.5%
Italy	$6.3 billion	1.5%
France	$4.8 billion	1.1%
Vietnam	$3.9 billion	0.9%

== Economies by provinces and territories ==
Economy by province
- Economy of Alberta
- Economy of British Columbia
- Economy of Manitoba
- Economy of New Brunswick
- Economy of Newfoundland and Labrador
- Economy of Northwest Territories
- Economy of Nova Scotia
- Economy of Nunavut
- Economy of Ontario
- Economy of Prince Edward Island
- Economy of Quebec
- Economy of Saskatchewan
- Economy of Yukon

== See also ==
- List of companies of Canada
- List of Canadians by net worth
- List of Canadian provinces and territories by gross domestic product
- Canada and the International Monetary Fund
- Canada's Global Markets Action Plan
- Canadian corporate law
- Canadian intellectual property law
- Comparison of Canadian and American economies
- Department of Finance Canada
- Land ownership in Canada
- List of Median household income of cities in Canada
- List of Commonwealth of Nations countries by GDP
- List of trade unions in Canada
- Public–private partnership in Canada
- Economy of North America
- List of recessions in Canada

== Notes ==
- "Gross domestic product (GDP) at basic prices, by industry". www150.statcan.gc.ca. January 31, 2013.
