= Green economy policies in Canada =

Green economy policies in Canada are policies that contribute to transitioning the Canadian economy to a more environmentally sustainable one. The green economy can be defined as an economy, "that results in improved human well-being and social equity, while significantly reducing environmental risks and ecological scarcities." Aspects of a green economy would include stable growth in income and employment that is driven by private and public investment into policies and actions that reduce carbon emissions, pollution and prevent the loss of biodiversity.

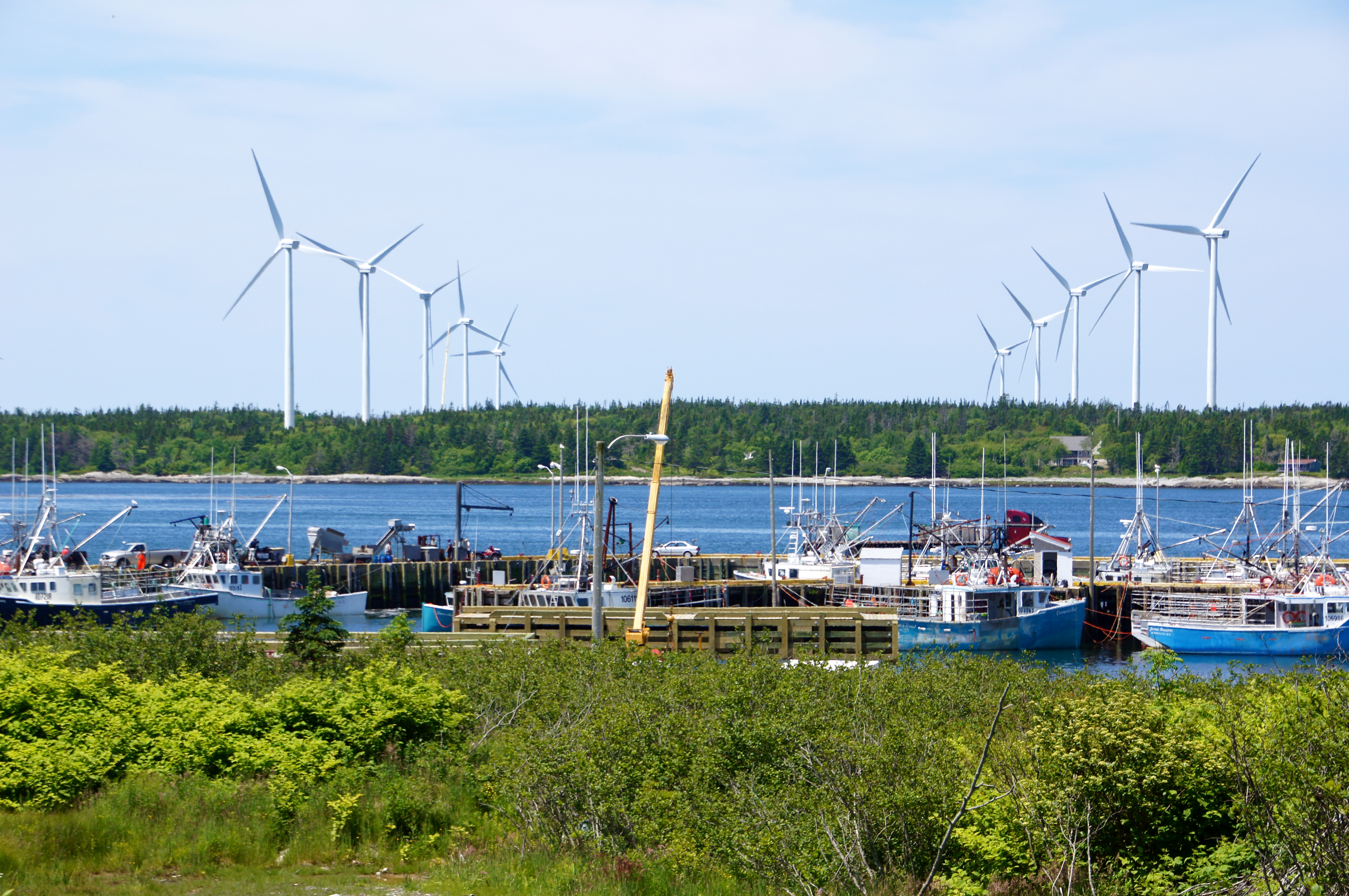
Wind turbines in Nova Scotia

Green economy policies can be defined as legislation or actions put forth by public institutions with the main intent of further establishing an environmentally sustainable system. Some of these policies would include investments into green energy sectors aimed at reducing carbon emissions, and aiding the growth of renewable energy resources. Green economy policies can also be considered on an international scale, with agreements such as the Kyoto Protocol and the Paris Agreement. Policies on a national level include, agreements such as the Western Climate Initiative, and the Boreal Forest Agreement among many others.

Green economy policies have become popular across various public jurisdictions in Canada. There has been an implementation of policies and initiatives across various levels of government. Due to the rise in frequency of these green economy policies in Canada, the socio-technical landscape is changing. More Canadians are supportive of green energy policies and a transition into a green economy.

== Varieties of green economy policies in Canada ==
=== Federal policies ===
==== Spending ====
For the federal government, there are several policy instruments that are available. Spending has been a key instrument in attempting to mitigate the effects of climate change so far. Government investment and support in regards to green technology will only further the process of decarbonisation in Canada. The federal government also collaborates frequently with the provinces in regards to how to move forward pursuing green technologies. The federal government also controls the Low Carbon Economy Fund, the money which could be used as leverage and under conditional circumstances to promote climate action from the provinces. In the federal budget of 2016 tabled by the federal government, the budget proposed providing $1 billion over 4 years to support clean technology. This included the forestry, fisheries, mining, energy and agriculture sectors. Budget 2016 also provided $2.9 billion over 5 years to address climate change and air pollution issues aimed at reducing emissions and help meeting international obligations. In total, nearly $1.6 billion will be spent on a clean growth economy from 2016-2018 by the federal government.

==== Carbon pricing ====
In 2016 the federal government has established a minimum carbon price floor for provinces that do not currently have a pricing program. According to the federal government, they are leaving it up to the provinces to implement a carbon pricing scheme. Below are government stated goals for the new carbon pricing strategy:

- Provinces and territories will have flexibility in deciding how they implement carbon pricing: they can put a direct price on carbon pollution or they can adopt a cap-and-trade system.
- Pricing will be based on greenhouse gas emissions and applied to a common and broad set of sources to ensure effectiveness.
- The price on carbon pollution should start at a minimum of $10 per tonne in 2018 and rise by $10 a year to reach $50 per tonne in 2022.
- The Government of Canada will provide a pricing system for provinces and territories that do not adopt one of the two systems by 2018.
- Revenues from carbon pricing will remain with provinces and territories of origin.

Carbon pricing has been a relatively new campaign pursued by the Government of Canada. The previous administration had not enacted a carbon scheme and the current government expects all jurisdictions across Canada to be compliant by 2018.

==== International agreements ====
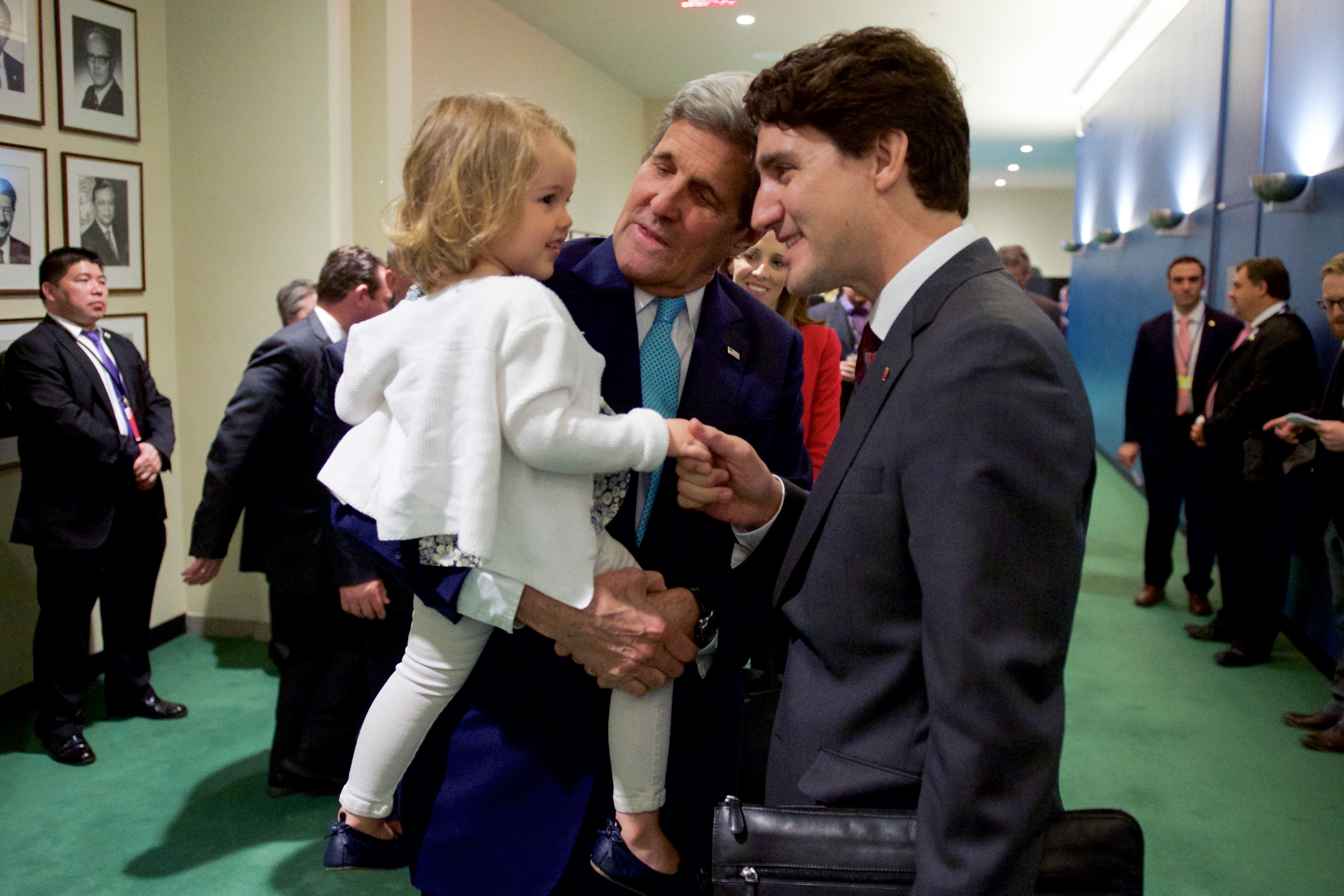
Trudeau at the Paris Climate agreement Conference

On December 12, 2015, the government of Canada signed a climate deal called the Paris Agreement. Under the agreement countries set their own limits on greenhouse gas reductions with the overall goal of keeping global warming below 2 degrees Celsius. While these targets are not legally binding, Canada specifically pledged to lower its emissions by 30% from 2005-2030. This agreement was ratified by 195 nations in total at the summit. This agreement was meant to replace the Kyoto protocol, which Canada withdrew from in 2011. The targets will also be reviewed every 5 years to make sure nations are compliant in accordance with the agreement.

Canada also has many bilateral agreements with various nations regarding green economy policies, including environmental cooperation agreements, along with a deep cooperation with the United States. The United Nations Framework Convention on Climate Change is the United Nations organization that led to the development and ratification of the Paris agreement.

=== Provincial Policies ===
==== Ontario ====
To comply with the Canadian federal policy, Ontario has chosen to implement a cap and trade system. The new system took effect on January 1, 2017. The system contains two key components, cap, and trade. The cap restricts the amount of greenhouse gas pollution businesses and institutions can release into the environment. The cap shrinks year to year to encourage lower emissions. Companies must have permits or credits to cover their emissions if they exceed the cap. This is where the trade part of the policy comes into effect. Companies can trade credits or permits. This allows for high polluters to buy credits or permits from low emission companies to cover their emissions. The revenue generated from the cap and trade must be invested in a transparent way to comply with the law. Places companies can invest are green technology, lower carbon fuels and buying extra credits. According to the Ontario government, it will cost Ontario homeowners an extra $13 a month. There will be three types of participants in the cap and trade. The first is voluntary participants who opt in to participate in the policy. The second is mandatory participants who by law are forced to participate. The third is market participants who participate in the allowance market but aren't forced to comply with other regulations of cap and trade.

==== British Columbia ====
British Columbia was the first province in Canada to implement a green economy policy. On July 1, 2008 the province implemented a revenue-neutral carbon tax. The objectives of the tax are:

- Encourage individuals, businesses, industry, and others to use less fossil fuel and reduce their - greenhouse gas emissions
- Send a consistent price signal
- Ensure those who produce emissions pay for them
- Make clean energy alternatives more attractive.

==== Alberta ====
The Alberta government has opted to implement a carbon levy and rebates policy to combat climate change. The policy took effect January 1, 2017 and increases in 2018. The prices at which the Alberta government has priced carbon is $20 per tonne in 2017 and then $30/ per tonne after the increase takes effect in 2018. Not all carbon will be taxed, the price is based on the amount of carbon pollution released by the fuel when it is combusted, not on the mass of fuel itself. These include transportation and heating fuels such as diesel, gasoline, natural gas, and propane. Certain fuels, such as marked gas and diesel used on farms, will be exempt from the levy. All revenue will be invested back into the province of Alberta.

==== Newfoundland and Labrador ====
Newfoundland and Labrador have implemented the Management of Greenhouse Gas Act (bill 34) to comply with federal climate change legislation. It took effect on March 7, 2017.

A fund has been created for supporting emissions-reduction technology, which will be 100% industry-funded. The goals of the management of greenhouse gas act are:

- The Government of Newfoundland and Labrador is introducing the new Management of Greenhouse Gas Act to reduce industrial emissions.
- Emissions will be monitored for two years to help set reduction targets in consultation with industry.
- The act also establishes a new fund for clean technology which will be 100% industry funded.
- Local large industry accounts for 43% of greenhouse gas emissions and more than 30% of GDP.

==== Quebec ====
Quebec was an early adopter when it comes to economic climate change policy. In 2013 the Quebec government implemented 2013-2020 climate change action plan making them one of the first provinces to implement green economic climate change policy. The policy called for $2.7 billion to be invested towards the government’s climate change goals. The revenues are self-funded from the carbon market. The plan allocates $200 million to support businesses to reduce GHG emissions by investing in projects related to energy efficiency, process optimization and the installation of more eco-performing equipment. The provincial government implemented the cap and trade system for businesses in the industrial and electricity sectors that emit 25,000 metric tons or more of CO_{2}. The goal of the policy is to reduce GHG emissions in the highest emitting sectors by promoting energy efficiency as well as the use of energy from renewable sources.

== Comparative green economy policies ==
=== Federal level ===
There are a variety of countries that a part of the OECD that are transitioning their economies towards one that is green and sustainable. Depending on the type of economy one’s country has, various policies are quite different. Germany has adopted a transition policy currently known as Energiewende. It is an ambitious industrial and societal transformation towards a low carbon energy system based on developing renewable energy. This has predominantly been done by convincing outside investors to invest heavily into the renewable sector, by having a feed-in tariff law. This is an example of a Coordinated Market Economy working with investors to spur green growth. There are three main parts to the feed in tariff-law:

(1) A purchase obligation for the local grid obligator;

(2) Guaranteed minimum prices; and

(3) A nationwide cost settlement system to balance out regional disparities

The energy market was liberalized in the late 1990s in Germany, but it still remains a productive but heavily regulated monopoly.

This feed-in tariff law has also notoriously been a safe investment for outside investors, which makes investing in green technology in Germany a safe bet. The feed in-tariff has also kept electricity prices steady, as a tweak in the feed-in tariff law accounts for the volatility associated with power generated from wind and solar sources. It is also estimated that in Germany nearly half of the country's energy capacity was run by cooperatives or owned by citizens through private installations.

This type of policy has been in stark contrast to Canadian green economy policy. Typically green economy policies in Canada have been aimed at investing directly into industries and companies aimed at growing the green economy. Prices in Canada for electricity have also been notably volatile.

USA’s policies have also been very similar to Canadian ones. In the 2010 budget, only about $21 billion focused on approaches that would reduce emissions in public transportation. Much of this money is in the form of grants and loans for green energy technology and tax breaks for various companies. However just $5.5 billion was allocated to grants and loans for emissions reducing technologies for the private sector. Most other green economy policies in the United States have been aimed at tax breaks or special tax provisions, which incentivizes certain energy related activities.

Most of the American policy is comparable to what is seen in Canada. The Canadian budget has been allocated to investing public money into green technology initiatives while focusing on creating a sustainable economy for jobs. This could potentially be related to the similar types of economies that Canada and the United States share, as Peter Hall and David Soskice see them as Liberal Market Economies. Meanwhile, Germany which has pursued different types of successful policies can be considered a Coordinated Market Economy.

=== Provincial level ===
When comparing green economy policy across provinces it is clear to see that policy diffusion has taken place. Quebec and Ontario have both opted for a cap and trade system over a carbon tax that the western provinces of British Columbia and Alberta have chosen. Policies have diffused from British Columbia to Alberta and from Quebec to Ontario. The differences between the two regions of Canada can be linked to historical differences where preferences on energy policy have often differed like the National Energy Program. From the policy diffusion you can see evidence of learning theory taking place. Ontario and Alberta have clearly demonstrated this concept and have taken the successful policies that have worked in their respective regions of Canada and applied them to their provinces. Provinces will continue to improve upon their current policies and grow their green economies using policy diffusion and learning theory. Provinces will compare policies and implement policies that work for them and achieve both economic and green objectives.
