= Economy of Saskatchewan =

- Currency: Canadian dollar

Statistics
- GDP: C$82,780 million (2014) C$64,323 million (2008); C$51,628 million (2007); C$45,909 million (2006); C$40,077 million (2004)
- GDP per capita: C$75,232 (2013)

External
- Export goods: Cereals, fertilizers, mineral fuels, oilseeds, pulp and paper, meat and meat products, and uranium.
- Main export partners: US (C$5,447 million), Japan (C$750 million ), China (C$447 million) 1997
- All values, unless otherwise stated, are in US dollars.

The economy of Saskatchewan has been associated with agriculture resulting in the moniker "Bread Basket of Canada" and Bread Basket of the World. According to the Government of Saskatchewan, approximately 95% of all items produced in Saskatchewan, depend on the basic resources available within the province. Various grains, livestock, oil and gas, potash, uranium, wood and their spin off industries fuel the economy.

As of 2025, Saskatchewan's real GDP (chained 2017 dollars) reached a record $85.4 billion, an increase of 2.2% from 2024 and above the national average of 1.6%. Growth was driven primarily by agriculture, forestry, fishing and hunting (+15.2%) and construction (+9.3%). Private capital investment rose 12% to $13.6 billion, ranking first among provinces.

== Agriculture ==
The Dominion Lands Act was passed in 1872 to encourage an agricultural settlement for a united British North America. The completion of the train link between eastern Canada through the District of Assiniboia in 1885, the development of the high-yielding and early-maturing Marquis strain of wheat and establishment of an import market in the United Kingdom supplied the first impetus for economic development and supported population settlement.

World War I had a positive impact on agriculture in Saskatchewan. The enlistment quota from Saskatchewan to the Canadian Expeditionary Force required recruits to be British subjects, while several ethnic bloc settlements in the province were composed of immigrants from Europe. Food production needed to be maintained, and farmers were exempt from conscription. Allied demand for wheat increased, and farm wages doubled. Following the war, the Soldier Settlement Act of 1917 provided servicemen with agricultural land.

Saskatchewan's population peaked in 1936 at 931,200 people. The Great Depression combined the 1929 stock market crash with the drought years of the 1930s causing devastating effects on the economy of Saskatchewan. The per capita income between 1928 and 1933 dropped 72%. The drought years of 1928, 1931 through 1934 and again in 1937 hit hard following the recession and the lowered demand for wheat exports. The Prairie Farm Rehabilitation Administration PFRA established a work relief program developing community pastures, water and irrigation projects. Approximately 250,000 people left the provinces during the era of the Dirty Thirties when Saskatchewan became a virtual dust bowl. World War II also held Saskatchewan's economy back, as overseas markets for wheat were virtually eliminated.

Saskatchewan agricultural land comprises 44% of the total Canadian farmland. Excluding a semi-arid area of the southwest used for grazing the parkland and mixed prairie areas of the province are used for crop production, mixed farming and dairying. Grain farming dominates the parkland area. Saskatchewan usually produces about 54% of Canada's wheat. The vast extensions of unbroken plain are well-suited to large-scale mechanized farming. Wheat is the most familiar crop but other grains like canola, alfalfa, barley flax, mustard, vegetable farms, forage seed, potatoes rapeseed, rye, oats, peas, lentils, canary seed, and barley are also grown. Specialty crop production sown in 1981 amounted to 136,000 to 2,474,000 hectares (340,000 to 6,110,000 acres) in 2001. The farm and agricultural component is still a significant part of the economy the Saskatchewan Wheat Pool (SWP), has been "the world's largest grain-handling co-operative". The SWP, now named Vittera, is no longer the major industrial component provincially ranking eighth largest.

Meat processing is the largest industry here, followed by dairy production, breweries, and the subsidiary industry of agricultural implements. Saskatchewan still has cattle ranching along the southwestern corner of the province. Mixed grain farming, dairy farms, mixed livestock and grazing lands dot the central lowlands region of this prairie province. Beef cattle production in the province is only exceeded by Alberta. Agricultural data for Saskatchewan has been collected since 1906. Saskatchewan has 41% of Canada's agricultural land, with an estimated 44,329 farms in 2006, generating a net farm income $CAN697.3 million in 2007.

=== Livestock ===
Since 1996 and 2001 census showed that livestock numbers have increased to record levels cattle: up by 4.4%, pigs by 26.4%, and sheep by 46. Beef cow numbers rose to 15.6 million head nationally. Saskatchewan had approximately 20% of the national herd with Alberta dominating at 43%. There were just more than 13.6% less dairy cows since 1996. There was an even bigger decline of 29.2% in the number of farms with dairy cows.

At the turn of the century, the early 1900s saw settlers who needed to import their butter. By the roaring twenties dairy production in Saskatchewan not only filled domestic needs, but Saskatchewan dairy farmers were able to export to Britain.

The numbers of large animals for 2001 were:

1. Cattle and calves (2.9 million)
2. Sheep and lambs (149,000)
3. Pigs (1.1 million)
4. Other animals (184,000)

The province also supported a large poultry industry with 9.7 million birds.

Diversification in livestock production has seen sheep, and lamb, goat, rabbit, and fox farms, and exotic animals such as bison, deer, elk and llama farms. Specialised livestock may include ratites which would be ostrich, emu, and rhea farms.

=== Business and markets ===
The total market value of Saskatchewan's farms estimated in 2001 was $33,463,911,487 in 2001 compared to the amount of $196,868,929,481 for all of Canada.

=== Farms and people ===
In 1996, the average farm size in Saskatchewan was 1,152 acres (5 km^{2}). As the farm population continued to decline, in 1996 only 14% of the Province's population lived on a farm.

Number of farmers
	2001	1996	1991
Saskatchewan	50,598	56,995	60,840
Canada	246,923	276,548	280,043

Most farms were grain and oilseed, however, the trend is to diversify with speciality crops and animals.

=== Land and crops ===
There were 44,329 farms in Saskatchewan as of May 15, 2006.

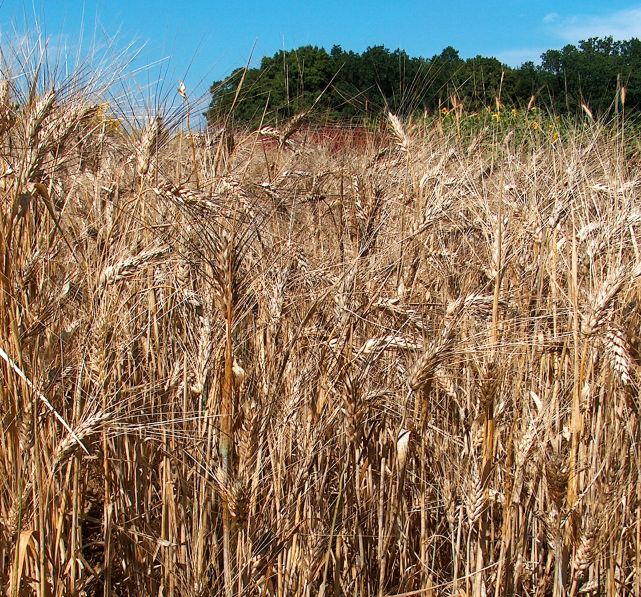
Durum wheat crop

Of these farms, 15.7% were cropped as wheat and 57.3% were typed as oilseed crops. The Crop Development Centre (CDC), established in 1971, helped establish the pulse industry in Saskatchewan. Oilseeds, pulses and speciality crops continued to increase as farmers diversified their crop production.

=== Crops ===
The 2006 census shows 44,328 farms, which declined in the last five years by 12.6%. According to the 2001 census the number of farms in Saskatchewan (50, 598) declined by 11.2% from the amounts reported from the prior census in 1996. Farms were fewer by 24.8% a decade ago (1991). In 1936, about seven decades ago the highest census for farms occurred and the number was 142,391.

Saskatchewan accounts for 20% of all Canadian farmers and has the largest farms with an average farm size of 1283 acres (up from 1,152 acres (5 km^{2}) in the last census). The province had nearly 40% of the agricultural land in Canada, nearly 13 million acres (53,000 km^{2}) more than second-place Alberta.

About 64.9 million acres (263,000 km^{2}) of the province is farmland. Thirty-eight million acres (154,000 km^{2}) were cropped in 2001.

Distribution of farmland:

1. Cropped: 38 million acres (154,000 km^{2})
2. Summer fallow: 7.7 million acres (31,000 km^{2})
3. Tame (seeded) pasture: 3.5 million acres (14,000 km^{2})
4. Natural pasture: 12.7 million acres (51,000 km^{2})
5. Other: 3.0 million acres (12,000 km^{2})

Spring wheat still dominated the prairie landscape, though the crop is losing ground to oilseeds and specialty crops.

The five major crops in 2001 were:

1. Spring wheat (10.7 million acres)
2. Barley (4.7 million acres)
3. Durum wheat (4.6 million acres)
4. Canola (4.3 million acres)
5. Alfalfa/alfalfa mixtures (2.8 million acres)

Farm cash receipts
Farm cash receipts accumulated to C$6,643,622 in 2006, and C$6,490,850 thousand in 2001. Wheat accounted for 26% of the total and cattle 19% in 2001. In 2006, there were 25.4% less wheat farms which amounted to 6,938, and a 6% increase in cattle farms amounting to 12,249 in 2006. The 2001 census reported that canola was the most significant crop after wheat and the pulse percentage and speciality crops were increasing. Dairy making continued in decline, while hog production was increasing. Whereas the 2006 census showed a rise in beef cattle, chicken egg production, broiler production, poultry hatcheries, combination poultry and egg production, apiculture, horse, livestock combination, soybean, oilseed, fruit, and nursery and tree production.

Saskatchewan (GPD) (2002)
In 2002, agriculture, fishing, and hunting accumulated for 6% of the Province's $28.1 billion GPD. The importance of agriculture however lay in the provinces exports. More than 73% of the GPD came from exports of goods and services.

Agriculture-food exports
Saskatchewan exported $4,152.2 million of agriculture and food products in 2000 making 32% of the total exports ($12,950.6 million). Agriculture and food products were a declining majority as a contributor to exports (i.e. in 1997 over 50% of exports were agricultural). The United States, Japan, EU, and China buy more than 50% of the agriculture-food exports. The USA is the single largest buyer, receiving 23% of Saskatchewan's agri-food exports.

== Technology ==
The two Innovation Place Research Parks immediately adjacent to Regina and Saskatoon Universities host several science and technology companies which conduct research activities in conjunction with University departments. Given Saskatchewan's booming economy and recent change of government, the shape of higher education in the province may be changing. Modern diversification has meant that now agriculture, forestry, fishing, and hunting together make up only 6.8% of the province's GDP. Not until the 1970s did the economy begin to shift from agri-based to industrial-based activity, although agriculture continues to dominate the economy of the city and province. Saskatchewan predominates as the largest producer of biofuels. Ethanol, biodiesel, and biogas are produced from canola, barley, and wheat.

A third innovation place research park has earned the Leadership in Energy and Environmental Design (LEED) award at the Prince Albert location named Forest Centre. The three parks contribute approximately $592 million to the provincial economy annually.

== Minerals ==
Mining is also a major industry in the province, with Saskatchewan being the world leader in potash and uranium exports. Saskatchewan is rich in minerals. Oil and natural gas found beneath the prairie, prove to be one of the province's most important minerals. The area north of Lake Athabaska has been exploited for ores yielding uranium. In 1995 Saskatchewan uranium amounted to 30% of world uranium reserves. The Paleoproterozoic greenstone belt around Flin Flon, in the northeast, is mined for copper, gold, and zinc. In the southwest and Estevan area, coal has been mined since 1880. In the early twentieth century lignite coal for power and heating was Saskatchewan's chief mineral. Clay products and ceramics were viewed as the next valuable resource in the early twentieth century. Potash mining began in the 1950s near Saskatoon and Esterhazy, and Canada is currently a leading producer of the mineral. The majority of the province's industries process raw materials. The world's largest publicly traded uranium company, Cameco, and the world's largest potash producer, Nutrien, have corporate headquarters in Saskatoon. Nearly two-thirds of the world's recoverable potash reserves are located in central Saskatchewan. Saskatchewan "has an estimated 75% of the world's potash reserves" kaolin, sodium sulphite and bentonite contribute to Saskatchewan's economy.

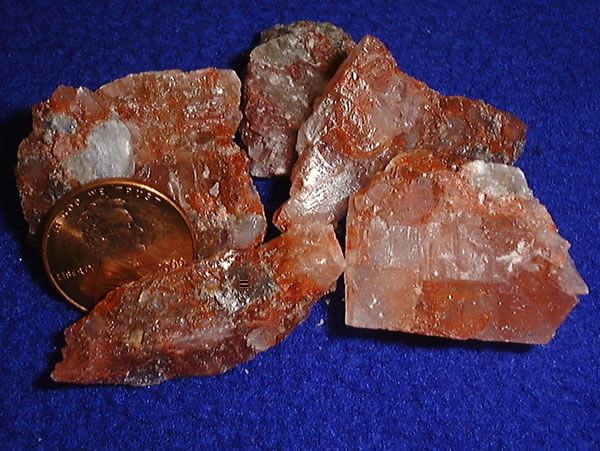
Potash mining for fertilizer

Preliminary Estimate of the Mineral Production of SK 2006
Metallic minerals
Copper	1,242	tonnes
Copper	9,601	$'000
Gold	1,505	kilograms
Gold	32,706	$'000
Selenium	3	tonnes
Selenium	172	$'000
Silver	119	$'000
Tellurium	28	$'000
Uranium (U)	9,781	tonnes
Uranium (U)	1,430,463	$'000
Zinc	541	tonnes
Zinc	1,901	$'000
TOTAL (metallic minerals)	1,474,990	$'000
Non-metallic minerals
Salt	1,132	kilotonnes
Salt	47,456	$'000
Sand and gravel (3), (5)	9,446	kilotonnes
Sand and gravel	37,071	$'000
Sulphur, elemental	165	kilotonnes
Sulphur, elemental	2,327	$'000
TOTAL (non-metallic minerals)	x	$'000
Fuels (6)
Coal	10,441	kilotonnes

== Oil and gas ==
Oil and natural gas production is also a very important part of Saskatchewan's economy, producing more oil than gas. Only Alberta exceeds the province in overall oil production. The first oil well was drilled as early as 1874 at Fort Pelly. Heavy crude is extracted in the Lloydminster-Kerrobert-Kindersley areas. Light crude is found in the Kindersley-Swift Current areas as well as the Weyburn-Estevan fields. Natural gas is found almost entirely in the western part of Saskatchewan, from the Primrose Lake area through Lloydminster, Unity, Kindersley, Leader, and around Maple Creek areas. Saskatchewan supplies about 10% of Canadian oil reserves and 25% of the nation's natural gas reserves.

== Forestry ==
In the northern part of the province, forestry is significant. North of the treeline in Saskatchewan are 350,000 square kilometres (140,000 sq mi) of forests which provide resources for the Saskatchewan forestry industry. The forestry industry comprises lumber and sodium sulphate for pulp and paper resources.

== Fisheries, hunting, trapping and fur farming ==
The historic process of fur trapping is still practiced. The Saskatchewan annual production from fisheries, fur farming and trapping rank below the forestry sector in provincial economy.

== Employment ==
A list of the top 100 companies includes The Potash Corporation of Saskatchewan, Federated Cooperatives Ltd. and IPSCO. Major Saskatchewan-based Crown corporations are Saskatchewan Government Insurance (SGI), SaskTel, SaskEnergy (the province's main supplier of natural gas), and SaskPower. Bombardier runs the NATO Flying Training Centre at 15 Wing, near Moose Jaw. Bombardier was awarded a long-term contract in the late 1990s for $2.8 billion from the federal government for the purchase of military aircraft and the running of the training facility.

== Government involvement ==
Legislation regarding environmental concerns and the economy of Saskatchewan are regulated by Saskatchewan Environment.

== See also ==
- Agriculture in Saskatchewan
- Crown corporations of Saskatchewan
- Crow Rate
- Culture of Saskatchewan
- Diffusion of technology in Canada
- Economic history of Canada
- Higher education in Saskatchewan
- History of Regina, Saskatchewan
- List of minimum wages in Canada
- Regina, Saskatchewan
- Saskatchewan Research Council
- Scientific research in Canada
- Seager Wheeler
- Tourism in Saskatchewan
- Transportation in Saskatchewan
- Western Economic Diversification Canada
- Seager Wheeler's Maple Grove Farm
- Saskatoon, Saskatchewan
- Canada's Global Markets Action Plan
- Free trade agreements of Canada
