= List of cities in Canada by median household income =

For the analysis of income, Statistics Canada distinguishes between the following statistical units:

- Households: "a person or group of persons who occupy the same dwelling"
- Economic families: "two or more persons who live in the same dwelling and are related to each other by blood, marriage, common-law union, adoption or a foster relationship (a couple may be of opposite or same sex)"
- Census families: "a married couple and the children, if any, of either and/or both spouses; a couple living common law and the children, if any, of either and/or both partners; or a lone parent of any marital status with at least one child living in the same dwelling and that child or those children (all members of a particular census family live in the same dwelling; a couple may be of opposite or same sex)"

Therefore, a person living alone constitutes a household, but not an economic or census family. Two couples sharing a dwelling constitute a single household, but two economic or census families. A couple living with its children and one spouse's parents constitutes a single household or economic family, but two census families.

Income statistics by census metropolitan area (CMA) are published:

- every 5 years for households (data from the Census of Population)
- annually for economic families, for select CMAs (data from the Canadian Income Survey)
- annually for census families (data from the T1 Family File)

The income concept for this article is total income.

== Median Household and Family Income by Census Metropolitan Area ==
Census Metropolitan Area	Median Income, Households 2020 (CAD)	Median Income, Census Families 2023 (CAD)	Median Income, Economic Families and Persons not in an Economic Family 2024 (CAD)	Median Income, Economic Families 2024 (CAD)
Oshawa	102000	118030
Calgary	100000	116530	104200	135800
Ottawa-Gatineau	98000	131390	99100	146900
Guelph	97000	121550
Barrie	97000	150240
Toronto	97000	102570	94300	136000
Edmonton	96000	114130	91100	129300
Kitchener-Cambridge-Waterloo	92000	108990
Hamilton	91000	115460
Abbotsford-Mission	91000	96970
Regina	90000	112700
Vancouver	90000	107720	89900	135400
Saskatoon	89000	111120
Kamloops	87000	113660
Victoria	85000	121850
St. John's	85000	113450
Red Deer	85000	107130
Kelowna	85000	109720
Brantford	85000	95560
Greater Sudbury	84000	114260
Lethbridge	84000	106330
Kingston	83000	112460
Winnipeg	83000	102140	82100	119000
Windsor	82000	89950
Chilliwack	82000	96430
Halifax	81000	108030
Thunder Bay	80000	109410
London	79500	99560
Fredericton	79000	105350
Peterborough	79000	101420
Belleville	78000	95720
Nanaimo	77500	103760
St. Catharines–Niagara	77000	94910
Québec	76500	117880	79900	125000
Montréal	76000	107640	81100	126500
Moncton	74500	94300
Saint John	74000	98060
Saguenay	70000	107140
Sherbrooke	65000	101790
Drummondville	64000	94870
Trois-Rivières	62400	98660
