= Canada and the International Monetary Fund =

Canada is one of the original members of the International Monetary Fund, having joined it on December 27, 1945. It has a quota of 11,023.9 million SDRs and 11,698 votes, 2.31% of the total IMF quota and votes, ranking the 9th of all. Canada has been represented on the IMF Board of Governors by Minister of Finance Chrystia Freeland since 2020. Canada elects an executive director on the fund's Executive Board with Antigua and Barbuda, Barbados, Ireland, Bahamas, Belize, Dominica, Grenada, Jamaica, St. Kitts and Nevis, St. Lucia, St. Vincent and the Grenadines. Philip John Jennings is the elected alternate director. Canada is the only G7 country that represents both lenders (Canada and Ireland) and borrowers (the Caribbean) at the IMF.

Canada has no loan agreements with the IMF, and has had no transactions with the Fund since January 1, 1984.

== Canada's contribution to the IMF ==
=== Monetary contributions ===
Canada is one of very few countries represented on the Boards of Directors of all the regional development banks: the European Bank for Reconstruction and Development (EBRD), the Asian Development Bank (ADB), the Inter-American Development Bank (IDB), the Caribbean Development Bank (CDB) and the African Development Bank (AfDB).

Canada also joined the Caribbean Regional Technical Assistance Center (CARTAC), which is associated with the IMF, and contributed US$16,956,673 to the regional technical assistance centers as of April 30, 2021. Canada participated in the green budgeting webinar with DPs, the United Nations Development Program, and the IMF in analyzing the Caribbean regional data in March, 2021. CARTAC launched a new debt management program 2021, funded by the government of Canada, it makes available dedicated and substantial resources for capacity building in debt management.

Canada contributed to the Pacific Financial Technical Assistance Center (PFTAC), the first regional technical assistance center of the IMF, US$1,136,191 for the fifth phase from November 1, 2016, to April 30, 2021.

=== Non-monetary contributions ===
Canada used to be one of the largest contributors to the IMF’s Institute for Capacity Development, which provides capacity development and training to officials in member countries. Canada had helped to build the IMF a better institution by arming the staff with better macroeconomic and financial management skills and knowledge. It is still in the list of top 10 partners for IMF Capacity Development from 2019 to 2021, participating in funds like the Anti–Money Laundering/Combating the Financing of Terrorism (AML/CFT III) and Somalia Country Fund. Canada also joined Pacific Financial Technical Assistance Center (PFTAC) to promote macro-financial stability in the Pacific Island countries (PICs) through a program of technical assistance and training.

Besides assistance in personnel training, Canada also worked on information-sharing program in the CARTAC to raise the efficiency in setting up the project and rule out duplication.

Finance Canada and CIDA also held bi-annual meetings with civil society prior to the Bank and IMF Spring and Fall meetings. These meetings were an important venue for exchanging opinions on a variety of issues.

== Canada and the IMF in the COVID-19 era ==
=== Canada’s COVID-19 economic response ===
==== Canada's domestic policy ====
The Bank of Canada has raised its main interest rate to 2.75% during the pandemic as a tactic to tackle inflation that has risen to 7.7%. The Governing Council continued to predict ongoing increase on the interest rate due to global economics and inflation. The IMF estimates that without Canada’s COVID-19 economic response, “real output would have declined by an additional 7.8 percentage points in 2020 and the unemployment rate would have been 3.2 percentage points higher.”

==== Canada's international funding policy ====
In the year of 2020, the IMF launched a COVID-19 Crisis Capacity Development Initiative to raise special and urgent fund for the countries struggling with the monetary shortage caused by the pandemic. The Initiative is currently funded by Japan, Germany, China, South Korea, Canada, Belgium, Spain, Singapore, and Switzerland, reaching 40 million dollars. The Initiative also linked to other important global themes, namely: tax policy and inclusive growth; supporting a green recovery; digitalization and financial access; debt management and revenue mobilization; and transparency and accountability in emergency response.

At the regional level, the Caribbean Community has launched a Caribbean Economic Recovery and Transformation Plan to develop a financing strategy to support post-pandemic investment needs. The IMF is partnering with the broader international community to help small developing countries to confront the challenges. The region could also harness its “blue economy” potential (sustainable use of ocean resources) by increasing investment in shipping, fisheries, and aquaculture. Countries should continue to pursue technological innovation, to improve efficiency, reduce cross-border transfers costs, and facilitate international trade.

=== IMF’s comment ===
The IMF observed that the Government of Canada's recovery plan is a welcome step.
