= Anglo-Canadian =

Anglo-Canadian may refer to:

- Canada–United Kingdom relations
- English Canadians, Canadians of English origin, or English-speaking Canadians
