= Canada–United Kingdom Free Trade Agreement =

Proposed free trade agreement between Canada and the United Kingdom

- Canada United Kingdom
- Type: Free trade agreement
- Context: Trade agreement between Canada and the United Kingdom
- Negotiators: (Canada) Canadian Trade Ministers: Mary Ng (until 14 March 2025); Dominic LeBlanc (until 13 May 2025); Maninder Sidhu (from 13 May 2025); (United Kingdom) British Trade Ministers: Anne-Marie Trevelyan (until 6 September 2022); Kemi Badenoch (until 5 July 2024); Jonathan Reynolds (until 5 September 2025); Peter Kyle (until 20 July 2026); Jonathan Reynolds (from 20 July 2026)
- Parties: Canada; United Kingdom
- Languages: English; French

The Canada–United Kingdom free trade agreement (CUKFTA) is a proposed free trade agreement which began negotiations on 24 March 2022. The trade agreement will be the third FTA to cover Canada–UK trade, and will supersede the Canada–United Kingdom Trade Continuity Agreement, extending the deal to cover services and digital trade.

== History ==
From 21 September 2017 until 30 December 2020, trade between Canada and the UK was governed by the Comprehensive Economic and Trade Agreement, while the United Kingdom was a member of the European Union. Following the withdrawal of the United Kingdom from the European Union, the UK and Canada signed a continuity trade agreement on 22 December 2020, based on the EU free trade agreement; the agreement entered into force on 1 January 2021. Trade value between Canada and the United Kingdom was worth £26,309 million in 2022.

While a member of the European Union, the Canada and Britain worked together on negotiations towards a Comprehensive Economic and Trade Agreement (CETA) between Canada and the European Union. The agreement has been ratified by the European Parliament and is provisionally in force since 2017.

The UK left the European Union at the end of January 2020, but continued to participate in the EU's trade agreements during a transition period that ended on 31 December 2020. In November 2020, the UK and Canada signed a continuity agreement in order to apply the terms of the EU-CA agreement to their bilateral trade. In March 2023, the UK concluded negotiations to accede to the Comprehensive and Progressive Agreement for Trans-Pacific Partnership a trade bloc of which Canada is a founding member.

== Negotiations ==
CUKFTA Round of Negotiations
Round	Dates	Location	Ref.
1	28 March–1 April 2022	London	
2	20–24 June 2022	Ottawa	
3	12–16 September 2022	Virtual meeting	
4	28 November–2 December 2022	Ottawa	
5	20–24 March 2023	London	
6	26–30 June 2023	Ottawa	
7	5–16 November 2023	Virtual meeting	
8	27 November–1 December 2023	Virtual meeting	

On 25 January 2024, the United Kingdom suspended negotiations for the free trade agreement due to a standoff between the two sides on the UK maintaining market access barriers for Canada's agriculture industry. This was the first time that the United Kingdom has suspended negotiations for a trade deal since Brexit.

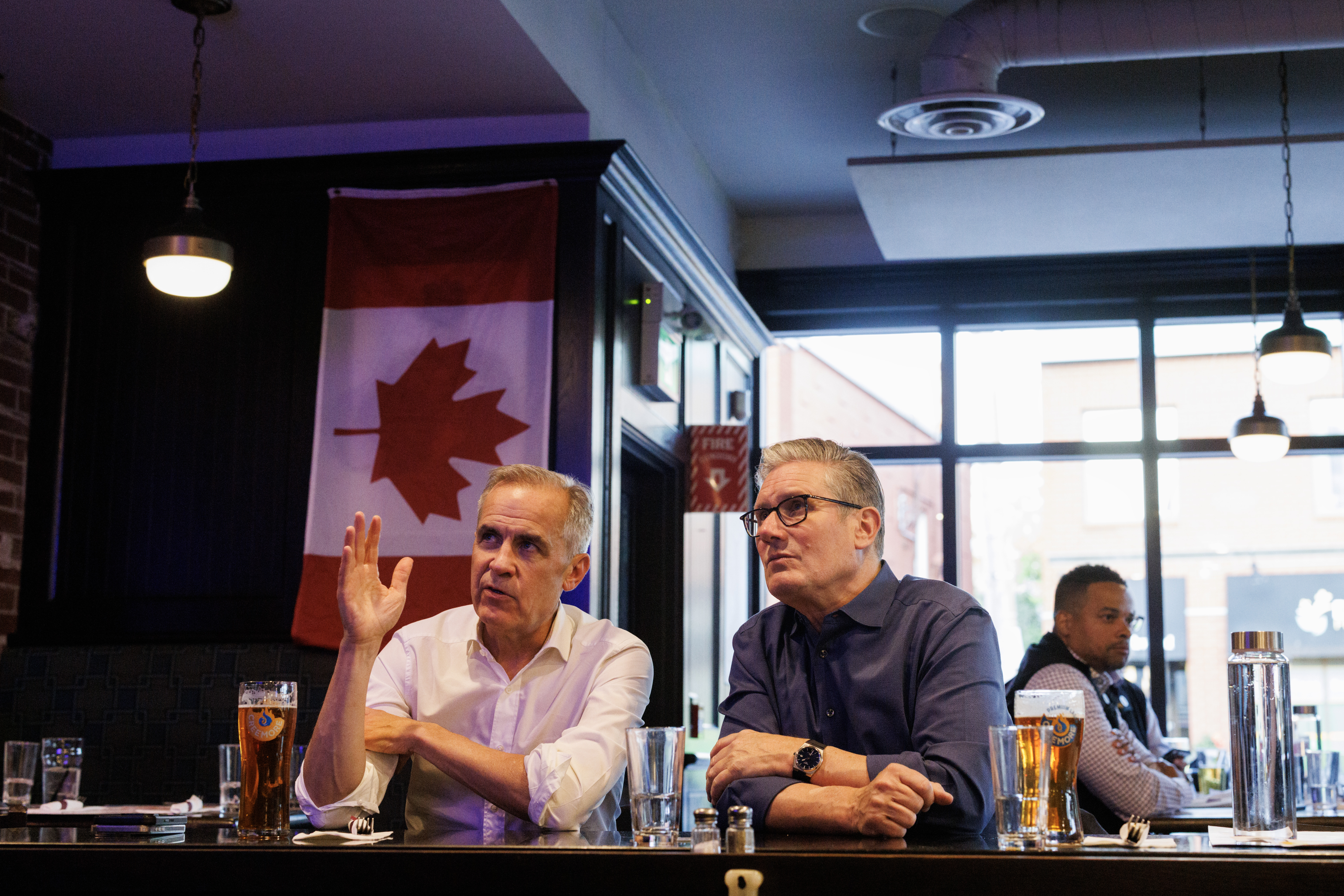
Canadian Prime Minister Mark Carney with British Prime minister Keir Starmer at the Royal Oak Pub in Ottawa, June 2025.

On 15 June 2025 prior to the 51st G7 summit, Starmer and Canadian Prime Minister Mark Carney agreed to establish an Economic and Trade Working Group, while Carney agreed Canada would ratify the UK's accession to CPTPP. While the UK was already a member of the CPTPP since December 2024, Canada's July 2026 ratification allowed the terms of the deal to apply between Canada and the UK from September 2026.

== See also ==
- Canada–United Kingdom relations
- Free trade agreements of Canada
- Free trade agreements of the United Kingdom
- Foreign relations of Canada
- Foreign relations of the United Kingdom
