= Costello v. Government of Ireland =

Irish court case on the permissibility of the state to ratify CETA

Costello v. Ireland
- Court: Supreme Court of Ireland
- Full case name: Patrick Costello v. Government of Ireland, Ireland and the Attorney General
- Decided: 11 November 2022
- Citation: [2022] IESC 44

Case history
- Appealed from: Costello v. Ireland [2021] IEHC 600

Court membership
- Judges sitting: O'Donnell C.J., MacMenamin J., MacMenamin J., Dunne J., Charleton J., Baker J., Hogan J., Power J.

Case opinions
- 1. The Constitution precludes ratification of CETA as Irish law now stands; 2. Amendments to the Arbitration Act 2010 would permit ratification
- Decision by: Dunne J.
- Concurrence: Baker and Hogan JJ.
- Concur/dissent: Charleton J.
- Dissent: O'Donnell C.J., Mac Menamin and Power JJ.

Keywords
- CETA

Costello v. Government of Ireland [2022] IESC 44 is a landmark decision of the Supreme Court of Ireland in which it held that Irish law precludes the ratification of the Comprehensive Economic and Trade Agreement, an agreement signed between Canada and the European Union on 30 October 2016.

The case had been taken by Patrick Costello, a Green Party TD.

== High Court ==
Patrick Costello challenged the constitutionality of ratification of the Comprehensive Economic and Trade Agreement (CETA) by the government of Ireland.

In September 2021, the Irish High Court rejected the challenge.

The judge, Nuala Butler, found that CETA did not entail an unconstitutional transfer of the State's sovereignty. She also found that tribunals established by CETA would not have jurisdiction to declare any provision of Irish law invalid. In addition she found that it was constitutionally appropriate and permissible for the State to ratify the agreement without a referendum.

== Supreme Court ==
In January 2022, the Supreme Court allowed direct appeal of this judgment to itself, bypassing the Court of Appeal in a "leapfrog" appeal due to "significant issues" regarding state sovereignty and the administration of justice raised in the case. This appeal began being heard in March 2022.

In November 2022, the Supreme Court upheld the challenge, finding by a 4–3 majority that ratification of CETA would be unconstitutional as Irish law currently stands. The court however found by 6–1 that if amendments were made to the Arbitration Act 2010, it would then be constitutional to ratify CETA. Gerard Hogan, one of the judges of the court, wrote in his decision that it "may yet be regarded as among the most important which this court has been required to hear and determine in its 100-year history".

== Political reaction ==
Leo Varadkar, Tánaiste and Minister for Enterprise, Trade and Employment, said that the government remained committed to the deal.
