= Patrick Costello (Irish politician) =

Irish former politician (born 1980)

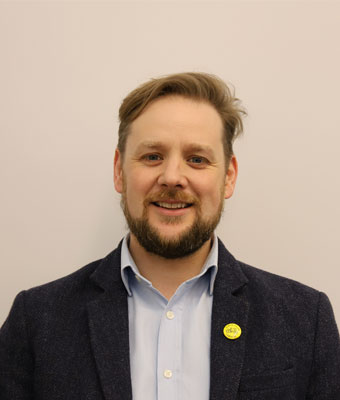
- Costello in 2020

Teachta Dála
- In office February 2020 – November 2024
- Constituency: Dublin South-Central

Personal details
- Born: 21 May 1980 (age 46) Dublin, Ireland
- Party: Green Party
- Spouse: Hazel Chu (m. 2021)
- Children: 1
- Relatives: Peter Costello (father)
- Education: University College Dublin; Trinity College Dublin

Patrick Costello (born 21 May 1980) is an Irish Green Party politician who served as a Teachta Dála (TD) for the Dublin South-Central constituency from 2020 to 2024. He is the party's spokesperson for Justice, Home Affairs and Migration.

== Early life ==
Costello attended Gonzaga College before studying at University College Dublin, graduating with a Bachelor of Arts in Psychology in 2002. He did a course in Drugs Counselling Theory and Intervention Skills. He later completed a Master of Social Work at Trinity College Dublin. He is a volunteer with Scouting Ireland in the 6th Dublin (Leeson Park) Scout Group.

After graduating, Costello worked in a variety of front line roles in homeless agencies and services for adults and children. He worked in Merchants Quay Ireland, Focus Ireland and for the HSE. He was working as a child protection social worker when he first ran for the local elections.

Costello is a board member of Clay Youth Project in Crumlin and served as a Human Rights Observer in Palestine with EAPPI.

== Political career ==
He ran in the 2014 Dublin City Council election in the Rathgar–Rathmines local electoral area and topped the poll. He then ran again in the 2019 Dublin City Council election in the Kimmage–Rathmines local electoral area and again topped the poll.

At the general election in February 2020, Costello was elected as a TD for the Dublin South-Central constituency. Carolyn Moore was co-opted to Costello's seat on Dublin City Council following his election to the Dáil.

In November 2020, he was elected vice-chairperson of the Joint Oireachtas Committee for Children, Equality, Disability, Integration and Youth. During his time in Dáil Éireann, he also served on the Joint Oireachtas Committee for Justice, the Committee on Key Issues affecting the Traveller Community, and the Committee on Assisted Dying.

In December 2020 Costello, alongside fellow Green TD Neasa Hourigan, raised major concerns about the entry of Ireland into the Comprehensive Economic and Trade Agreement (CETA), a trade agreement between Canada and members of the EU, due to fears about the proposed investment court system. The investment court system is designed to act as a method of solving business disputes between investors and participating countries. Costello argued that the court system would allow Canadians investing in Ireland to sue the state if the state impeded their profits, such as with environmentalist laws, and this was a major threat to Ireland's sovereignty. Costello suggested that the matter may need to be resolved by a referendum. In July 2021 Costello brought the matter before the High Court, arguing aspects of the trade deal would be unconstitutional. In Costello v. Government of Ireland, the High Court ruled in September 2021 against Costello. In November 2022, the Supreme Court found on appeal that current Irish law prohibited ratification of CETA.

On 17 May 2022 Costello and Hourigan were both suspended from the Green Party for six months after they voted against the government on a motion calling for the new National Maternity Hospital to be built on land wholly owned by the state. Before the vote, Hourigan explained her rationale by saying she could not support the government's decision to approve plans to move the National Maternity Hospital from Holles Street to the St Vincent's Hospital campus due to concerns over the governance and ethos at the new facility, which is to be built on a site ultimately leased from the Catholic Church, and with fears in some quarters that potential lingering religious influence could mean abortions or fertility treatment would not be allowed to take place at the new hospital. The government coalition parties (Fine Gael, Fianna Fáil and the Greens) had been whipped to abstain on the motion. Costello and Hourigan were re-admitted to the parliamentary party in November 2022.

He lost his seat at the 2024 general election.

== Personal life ==
In 2021, he married Hazel Chu, the then Lord Mayor of Dublin. They first met while both studying at University College Dublin. They have one daughter.

His mother Mary Litton Costello was an administrator in Trinity College Dublin and his father Peter Costello is an author and expert on James Joyce.

Dáil	Election	Deputy (Party)	Deputy (Party)	Deputy (Party)	Deputy (Party)	Deputy (Party)
13th	1948	Seán Lemass (FF)	James Larkin Jnr (Lab)	Con Lehane (CnaP)	Maurice E. Dockrell (FG)	John McCann (FF)
14th	1951	Seán Lemass (FF)	James Larkin Jnr (Lab)	Philip Brady (FF)	Maurice E. Dockrell (FG)	John McCann (FF)
15th	1954	Seán Lemass (FF)	James Larkin Jnr (Lab)	Thomas Finlay (FG)	Maurice E. Dockrell (FG)	Celia Lynch (FF)
16th	1957	Seán Lemass (FF)	Jack Murphy (Ind.)	Philip Brady (FF)	Maurice E. Dockrell (FG)	Celia Lynch (FF)
16th	1958 by-election	Seán Lemass (FF)	Patrick Cummins (FF)	Philip Brady (FF)	Maurice E. Dockrell (FG)	Celia Lynch (FF)
17th	1961	Seán Lemass (FF)	Patrick Cummins (FF)	Philip Brady (FF)	Maurice E. Dockrell (FG)	Joseph Barron (CnaP)
18th	1965	Seán Lemass (FF)	Frank Cluskey (Lab)	Philip Brady (FF)	Maurice E. Dockrell (FG)	Thomas J. Fitzpatrick (FF)
19th	1969	Richie Ryan (FG)	Ben Briscoe (FF)	Philip Brady (FF)	John O'Donovan (Lab)	4 seats 1969–1977
20th	1973	Richie Ryan (FG)	Ben Briscoe (FF)	Philip Brady (FF)	John Kelly (FG)	4 seats 1969–1977
21st	1977	Fergus O'Brien (FG)	Frank Cluskey (Lab)	Thomas J. Fitzpatrick (FF)	3 seats 1977–1981	
22nd	1981	Fergus O'Brien (FG)	Ben Briscoe (FF)	Thomas J. Fitzpatrick (FF)	Gay Mitchell (FG)	John O'Connell (Note: O'Connell served as Ceann Comhairle in the 22nd and 23rd Dáil from 1981 to 1983 and was returned automatically at the February 1982 and November 1982 general elections. He joined Fianna Fáil in January 1985.) (Ind.)
23rd	1982 (Feb)	Frank Cluskey (Lab)	Ben Briscoe (FF)	Thomas J. Fitzpatrick (FF)	Gay Mitchell (FG)	John O'Connell (Ind.)
24th	1982 (Nov)	Frank Cluskey (Lab)	Ben Briscoe (FF)	Fergus O'Brien (FG)	Gay Mitchell (FG)	John O'Connell (Ind.)
25th	1987	Frank Cluskey (Lab)	Ben Briscoe (FF)	Fergus O'Brien (FG)	Gay Mitchell (FG)	Mary Mooney (FF)
26th	1989	John O'Connell (FF)	Ben Briscoe (FF)	Fergus O'Brien (FG)	Gay Mitchell (FG)	Eric Byrne (WP)
27th	1992	John O'Connell (FF)	Ben Briscoe (FF)	Pat Upton (Lab)	Gay Mitchell (FG)	4 seats 1992–2002
27th	1994 by-election	Eric Byrne (DL)	Ben Briscoe (FF)	Pat Upton (Lab)	Gay Mitchell (FG)	4 seats 1992–2002
28th	1997	Seán Ardagh (FF)	Ben Briscoe (FF)	Pat Upton (Lab)	Gay Mitchell (FG)	4 seats 1992–2002
28th	1999 by-election	Seán Ardagh (FF)	Ben Briscoe (FF)	Mary Upton (Lab)	Gay Mitchell (FG)	4 seats 1992–2002
29th	2002	Seán Ardagh (FF)	Aengus Ó Snodaigh (SF)	Mary Upton (Lab)	Gay Mitchell (FG)	Michael Mulcahy (FF)
30th	2007	Seán Ardagh (FF)	Aengus Ó Snodaigh (SF)	Mary Upton (Lab)	Catherine Byrne (FG)	Michael Mulcahy (FF)
31st	2011	Eric Byrne (Lab)	Aengus Ó Snodaigh (SF)	Joan Collins (PBP)	Catherine Byrne (FG)	Michael Conaghan (Lab)
32nd	2016	Bríd Smith (AAA–PBP)	Aengus Ó Snodaigh (SF)	Joan Collins (Note: Founded Right to Change in May 2020.) (I4C)	Catherine Byrne (FG)	4 seats from 2016
33rd	2020	Bríd Smith (S–PBP)	Aengus Ó Snodaigh (SF)	Joan Collins (I4C)	Patrick Costello (GP)	4 seats from 2016
34th	2024	Catherine Ardagh (FF)	Aengus Ó Snodaigh (SF)	Máire Devine (SF)	Jen Cummins (SD)	4 seats from 2016
