= Canada–United Kingdom relations =

- Canada: United Kingdom

Diplomatic mission
- High Commission of Canada, London: High Commission of the United Kingdom, Ottawa

Envoy
- High Commissioner Bill Blair: High Commissioner David Prodger

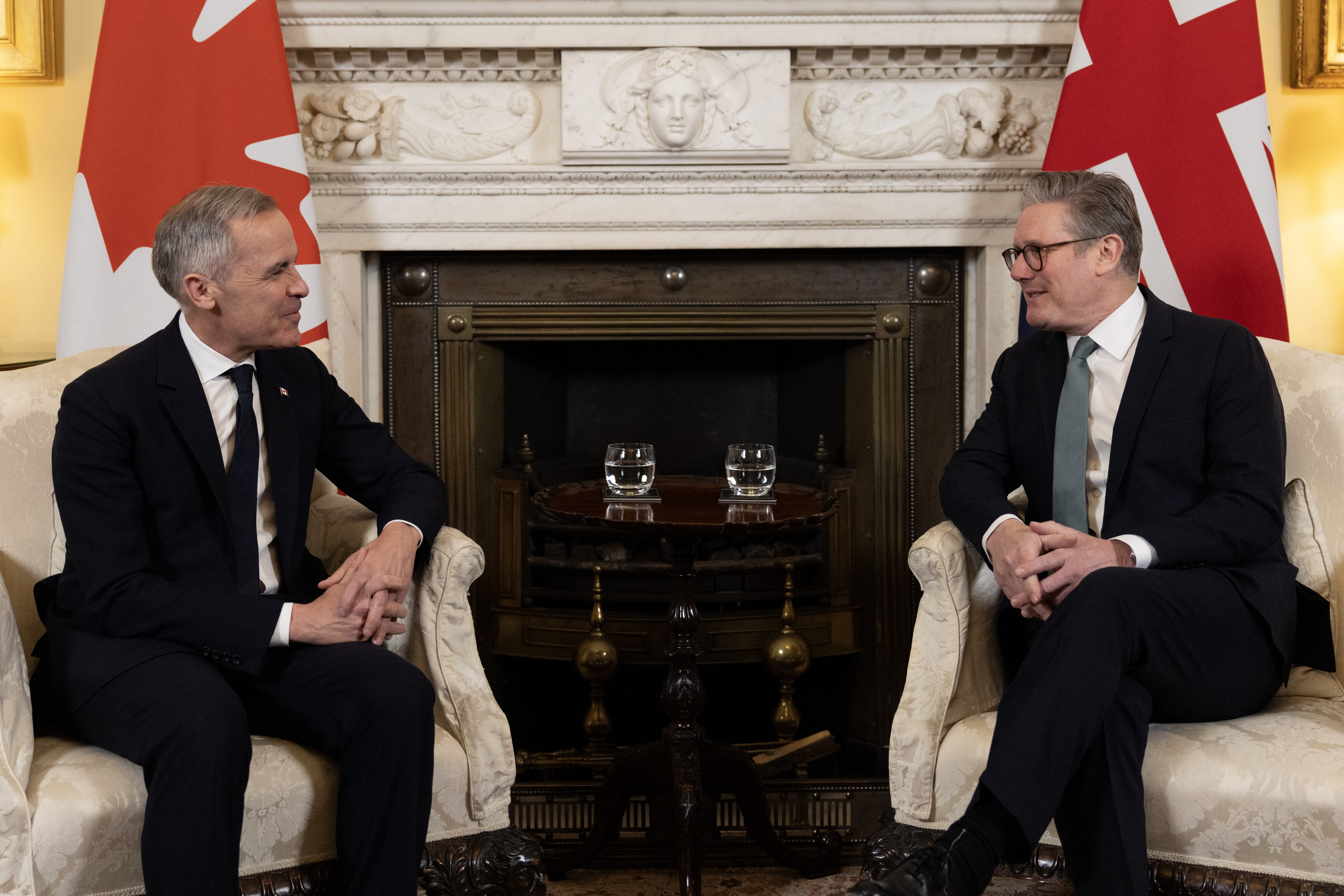
Prime ministers Mark Carney of Canada and Sir Keir Starmer of the United Kingdom at 10 Downing Street on 17 March 2025

Bilateral relations between Canada and the United Kingdom have yielded intimate and frequently co-operative contact since Canada gained independence in 1931. Canada was previously self-governing since 1 July 1867, the date that became Canada's national holiday.

Both are related by mutual migration, through shared military history, a shared system of government, western values, the English language, being Commonwealth Realms, a personal union, where both nations share the same head of state, currently King Charles III, as well as both being members of the Commonwealth of Nations, formerly known as the British Empire. Both also share a defence agreement, NATO, and frequently perform military exercises together. Canada hosts the largest British Military Base outside the United Kingdom, and the two countries share an Arctic Naval-Training Pact.

Despite the shared legacy, the two nations grew apart economically during the 20th century after the UK lost its position as Canada's largest trading partner to the United States during the 19th century. However, that trend has been reversed somewhat in the 21st century as the two countries have been negotiating freer trade as members of the Comprehensive and Progressive Agreement for Trans-Pacific Partnership (CPTPP).

== History ==
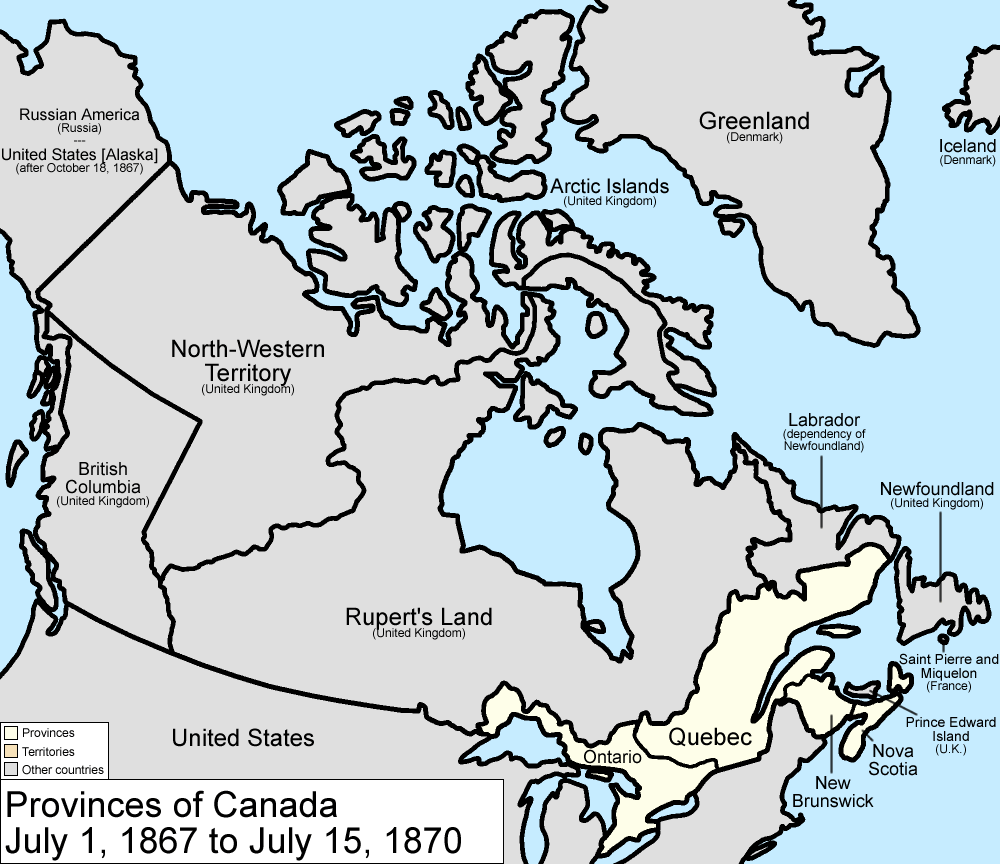
The colonies that made up British North America in 1867. The highlighted areas represent the colonies of New Brunswick, Nova Scotia, and the Province of Canada, the three colonies that first formed the Canadian Confederation in 1867.

Canada was formed in 1867 as a dominion bringing together parts of the British Empire. The Canadian Confederation federated the British crown colonies of the Province of Canada, Province of New Brunswick, and the Province of Nova Scotia. The history of relations between Canada and London, well into the 20th century, is the story of London's steadily increasing control and Canada's slow evolution towards full sovereignty.

=== British settlement of Canada ===
From early colonial days, London had close relations with areas that eventually became part of Canada. Historians debate whether John Cabot in 1497 made landfall in Nova Scotia or in Newfoundland. Sir Humphrey Gilbert, with authorization from Queen Elizabeth I, landed in St. John's in August 1583. He formally took possession of Newfoundland for England. In the Treaty of Utrecht (1713), Paris acknowledged London's ownership of Newfoundland, and London endorsed the rights of French fishermen to use the rich waters off the northern peninsula and the northeastern coast.

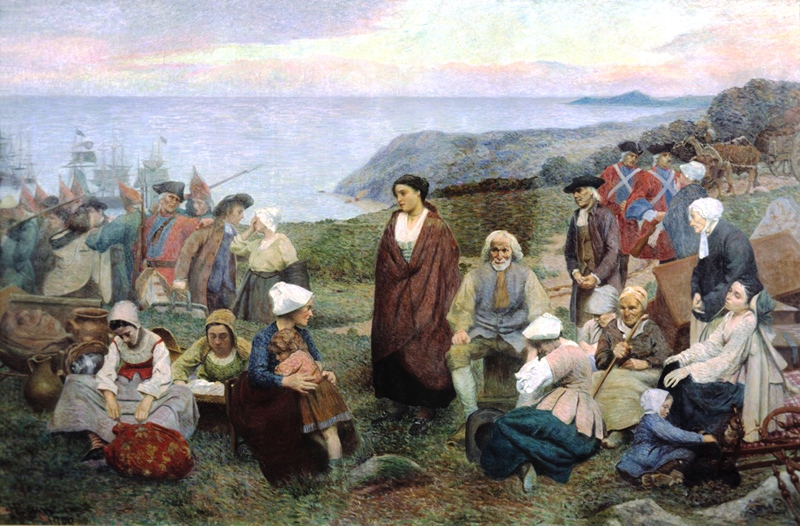
Expulsion of the Acadians in 1755

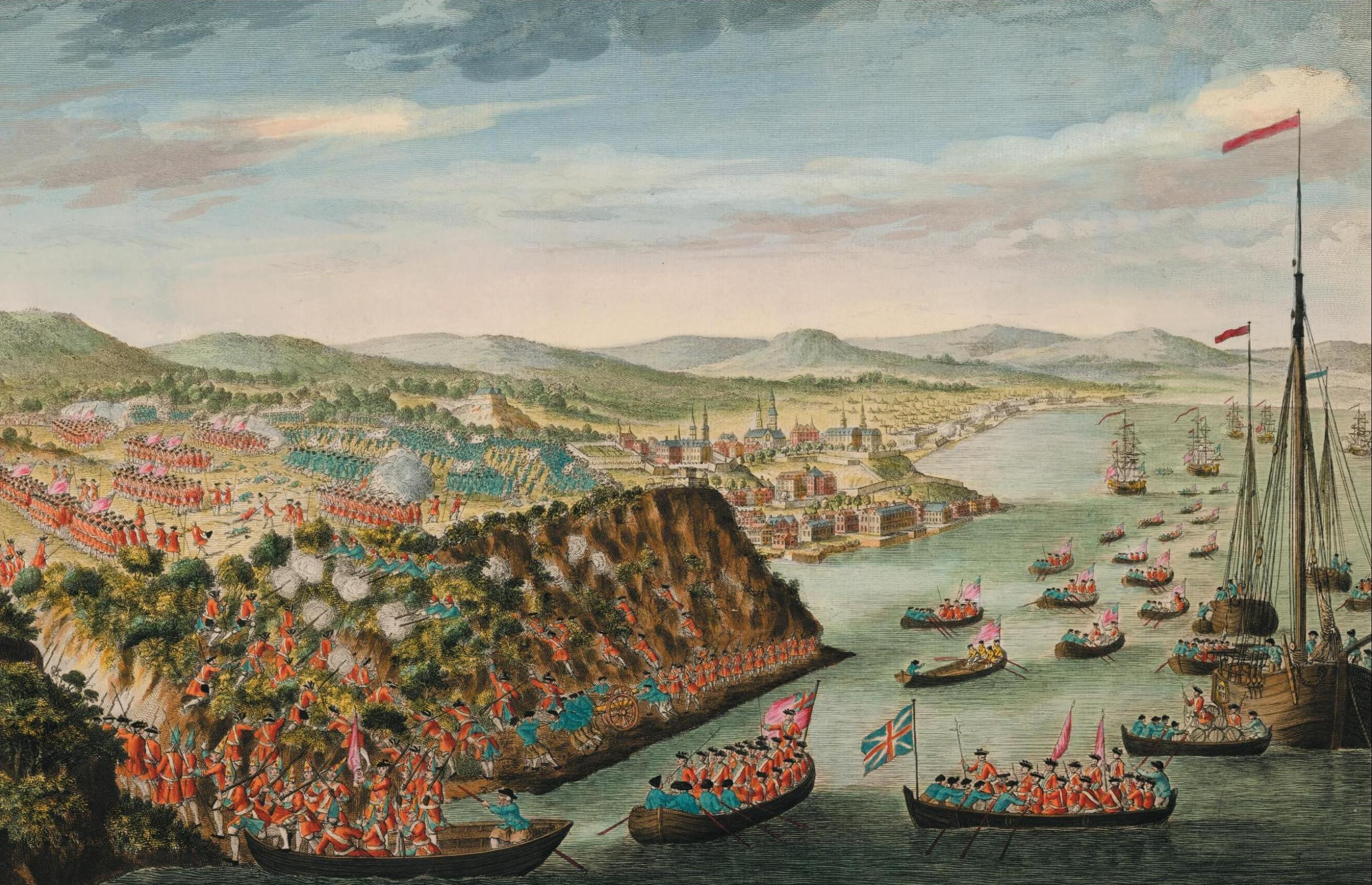
Depiction of the Battle of the Plains of Abraham in 1759, a decisive British victory that led to the British occupation of Quebec City

The French first settled Nova Scotia in 1604. The land then saw a century and a half of warfare involving the French, English, Scottish, and Dutch forces, as well as local indigenous elements. By 1763, London was in full control. New Brunswick was formed in 1784 by partitioning Nova Scotia.

In 1759, Britain conquered New France and, after the Treaty of Paris (1763), began to populate the Province of Quebec with English-speaking settlers. British governors had complete control of Quebec until the Constitutional Act of 1791, which created the first Canadian legislatures. The weak bodies were still inferior to the governors until the granting of responsible government in 1848. With their new powers, the colonies chose to federate in 1867, creating a new state, Canada, with the new title of dominion.

=== Self-governing dominion within the British Empire ===
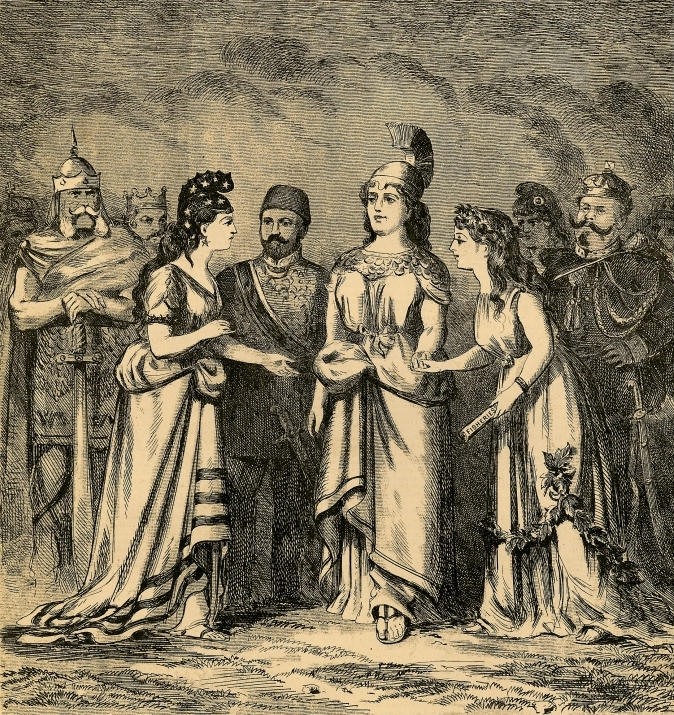
A political cartoon from 1871 depicting "Canada" holding hands with "Britannia" as Canada makes her debut to the "council of nations"

The constitution of the new Canadian federation left foreign affairs to the Imperial Parliament, in Westminster, but the leaders of the federal parliament, in Ottawa, soon developed their own viewpoints on some issues, notably relations between the British Empire and the United States. Stable relations and secure trade with the United States were becoming increasingly vital to Canada, so much so that historians have said that Canada's early diplomacy constituted a "North Atlantic triangle".

Most of Canada's early attempts at diplomacy necessarily involved the "mother country." Canada's first (informal) diplomatic officer was Sir John Rose, who was sent to London by Canadian Prime Minister John A. Macdonald. George Brown was later dispatched to Washington by Prime Minister Alexander Mackenzie to influence British-American trade talks. The British government desired to formalise Canada's representation abroad, rather than deal with so many informal lobbyists, and so in 1880, Alexander Tilloch Galt became the first High Commissioner sent from a dominion to Britain.

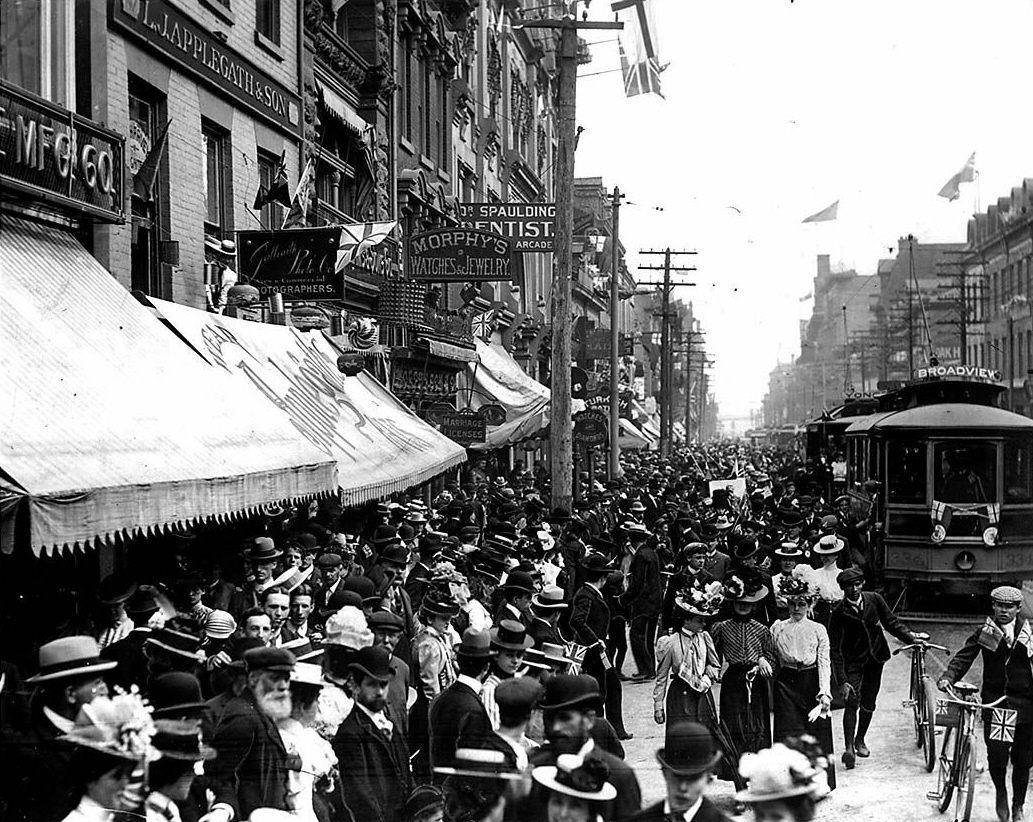
Celebration of the end of the Boer War, Yonge Street, Toronto, 31 May 1900

In the Boer War, 1899–1902, Anglophone Canadians volunteered to fight for the empire in large numbers despite the lukewarm support of the Canadian government of Wilfrid Laurier, the Liberal prime minister. However, in 1903, when Britain sided with the United States during the Alaska boundary dispute, Canadians were shocked and outraged at London's betrayal. Economically, Canadian governments were interested in free trade with the United States, but since that was difficult to negotiate and politically divisive, they became leading advocates of Imperial Preference, which met with limited enthusiasm in Britain.

=== World War I ===
At the outbreak of World War I, the Canadian government and millions of Canadian volunteers enthusiastically joined Britain's side, but the sacrifices of the war and the fact that they were made in the name of the British Empire caused domestic tension in Canada and awakened a budding nationalism in Canadians. The majority of soldiers of the Canadian Corps in Europe were British-born Canadians until near the end of the war, when the number of those of Canadian birth who had enlisted rose to 51 percent.

At the Paris Peace Conference, Canada demanded the right to sign treaties without British permission and to join the League of Nations. By the 1920s, Canada was taking a more independent stance on world affairs. Following the meeting of heads of government at the 1926 Imperial Conference, the Balfour Declaration stated that Britain would no longer legislate for the dominions, which were acknowledged as fully independent and coequal states with the right to conduct their own foreign affairs. That was later formalised by the Statute of Westminster 1931.

=== World War II ===
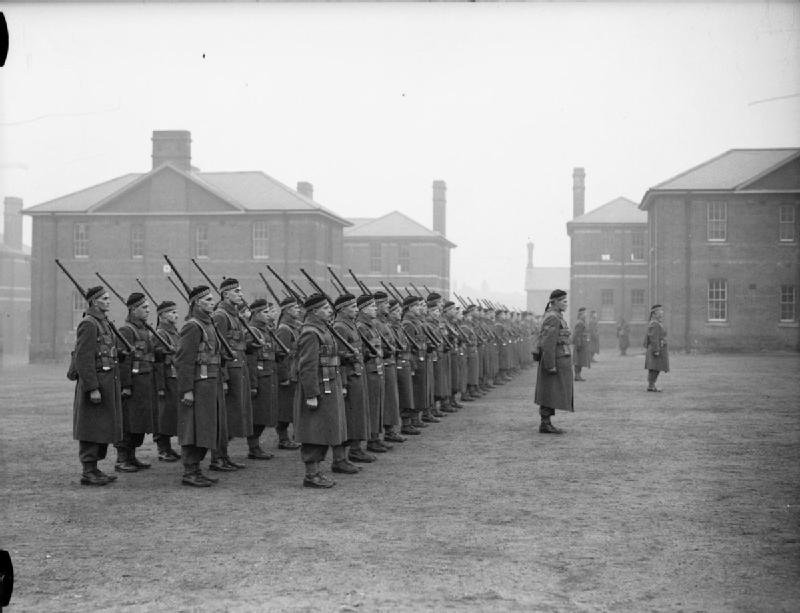
Canadian soldiers on parade in the UK, December 1939; shortly after the outbreak of the Second World War.

Loyalty to Britain still existed, however, and during the darkest days of World War II for Britain, after the fall of France and before the entry of the Soviet Union and the United States as allies, Canada was Britain's main ally in the North Atlantic providing naval defence against German submarines.

==== Financial aid ====
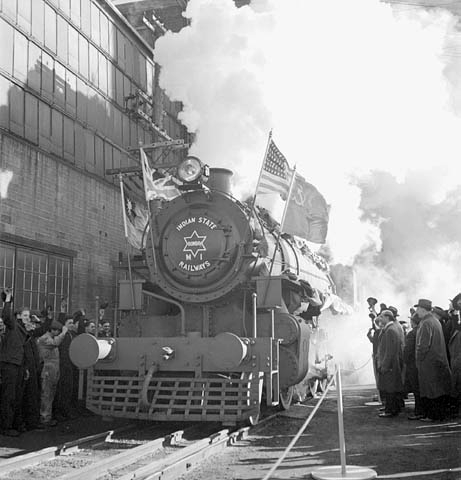
The first of 145 X-Dominion 2-8-2 locomotives built at the Montreal Locomotive Works, for shipment to India.

The Billion Dollar Gift and Mutual Aid were two large programs to help finance the British war effort. They were similar to the American Lend Lease program.

Due to its expenditure on war materiel, Britain lacked gold reserves and US dollars, to pay for existing and future orders with Canadian industry. At the same time, following expansion, the Canadian industry was dependent on British contracts and before the war had had a positive balance of trade with the UK, but with the establishment of Lend-Lease, the UK placed future orders with the US. The Billion Dollar Gift was given in January 1942, coupled with a C$700 million non-interest-bearing loan, both anticipated to last just over a year. It did not last until the end of 1942. It was replaced in May 1943 with the "War Appropriation (United Nations Mutual Aid) Act, 1943", which provided for aid to the UK and the other Allies and lasted until the end of the war. The magnitude of these contributions made them one of Canada's greatest contributions to the war effort. The two grants totaled over C$3 billion.

Moreover, the Billion Dollar Gift triggered a strong unpopular reaction amongst Canadians, which was demonstrated particularly in Quebec. The rate at which the money was used was a key reason in creating this unpopular view, as well as the lack of funding that was provided to the other nations in the Commonwealth. The aftermath of the Gift led Canada's future funding to assist the Allies with an alternative approach; one that focused on loaning material goods instead of money. A further consequence led to a change in the British Commonwealth Air Training Plan and this enabled another Canadian loan of just over $1 billion for Britain, Canada, Australia and New Zealand to share.

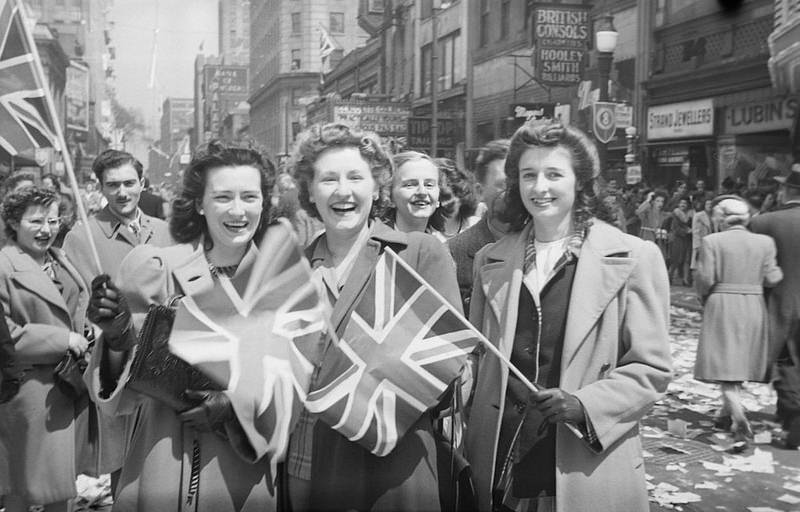
People in Montreal celebrating the defeat of Nazi Germany, 9 May 1945

In addition, Canada provided materiel and services, including food, ammunition, and raw materials, as well as corvettes, Park ships, and radar sets, most of which went to the Commonwealth; some, like radars, also went to the US In 1943, Canada had the fourth-highest industrial production among the Allies, behind the US, the Soviet Union and Britain. Canada also loaned $1.2 billion on a long-term basis to Britain immediately after the war; these loans were fully repaid in late 2006.

After the destruction that Germany had inflicted on Europe during the war, Canada's relative economic and military importance was at a peak in the late 1940s, just as Great Britain was declining because of industrial exhaustion and military decline. Both were dwarfed by the new superpowers; however, policymakers in the United Kingdom, the United States, and Canada were eager to participate in a lasting military alliance to defend against the Soviet Union, which resulted in the creation of NATO in 1949.

=== Constitutional independence ===
The definitive break in Canada's loyalist foreign policy came during the Suez Crisis of 1956, when the Canadian government flatly rejected calls from the British government for support of the British, French, and Israeli invasion of Egypt. Eventually, Canada helped the three to save face and to extract themselves from a public relations disaster. The Canadian delegation to the United Nations, led by future Prime Minister Lester B. Pearson, proposed a peacekeeping force to separate the two warring sides, and so he was awarded the Nobel Peace Prize.

Meanwhile, Canada's legal separation from Britain continued. Until 1946, Britain and Canada shared a common nationality code. The Canadian Citizenship Act 1946 gave Canadians a separate legal nationality from Britain. Canadians could no longer appeal court cases to the Judicial Committee of the Privy Council in London after 1949.

The final constitutional ties between the United Kingdom and Canada ended with the passing of the Canada Act 1982. An Act of the British Parliament passed at the request of the Canadian federal government to "patriate" Canada's constitution, ending the necessity for the country to request certain types of an amendment to the Constitution of Canada to be made by the British Parliament. The Act also formally ended the "request and consent" provisions of the Statute of Westminster 1931 about Canada, whereby the British parliament had a general power to pass laws extending to Canada at the latter's request.

=== Proposed Canadian political association with the Turks and Caicos Islands ===
Since 1917, it has been proposed that the Turks and Caicos Islands, a British Overseas Territory, be annexed into Canada. The proposal peaked in popularity in the 1980s, but has waned in popularity since then.

== Defence and security ==
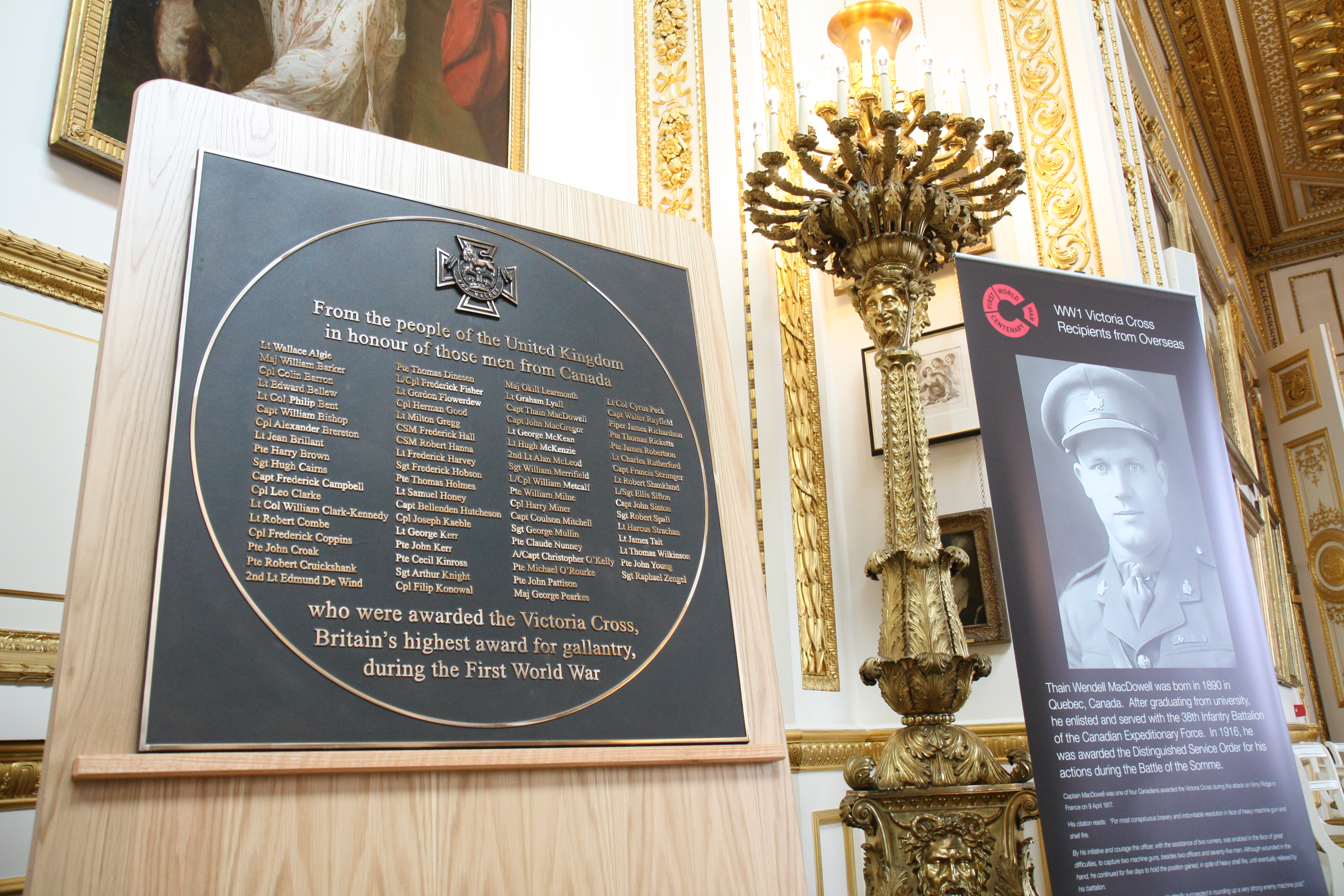
A plaque from the "people of the United Kingdom," that commemorates Canadian Victoria Cross recipients from the First World War

The two countries have a long history of close collaboration in military affairs. Canada fought alongside Britain and its Allies in World War I. Canadians of British descent, the majority of the country, gave widespread support by arguing that Canadians had a duty to fight on behalf of their Motherland. Indeed, Prime Minister Wilfrid Laurier, despite being French-Canadian, spoke for the majority of English-Canadians when he proclaimed: "It is our duty to let Great Britain know and to let the friends and foes of Great Britain know that there is in Canada but one mind and one heart and that all Canadians are behind the Mother Country." It fought with Britain and its allies again in World War II and Korean War.

Until 1972, the highest military decoration awarded to members of the British and Canadian Armed Forces was the Victoria Cross, and 81 members of the Canadian military (including those from Newfoundland) and 13 Canadians serving in British units had been awarded the Victoria Cross. In 1993, Canada created its own Victoria Cross.

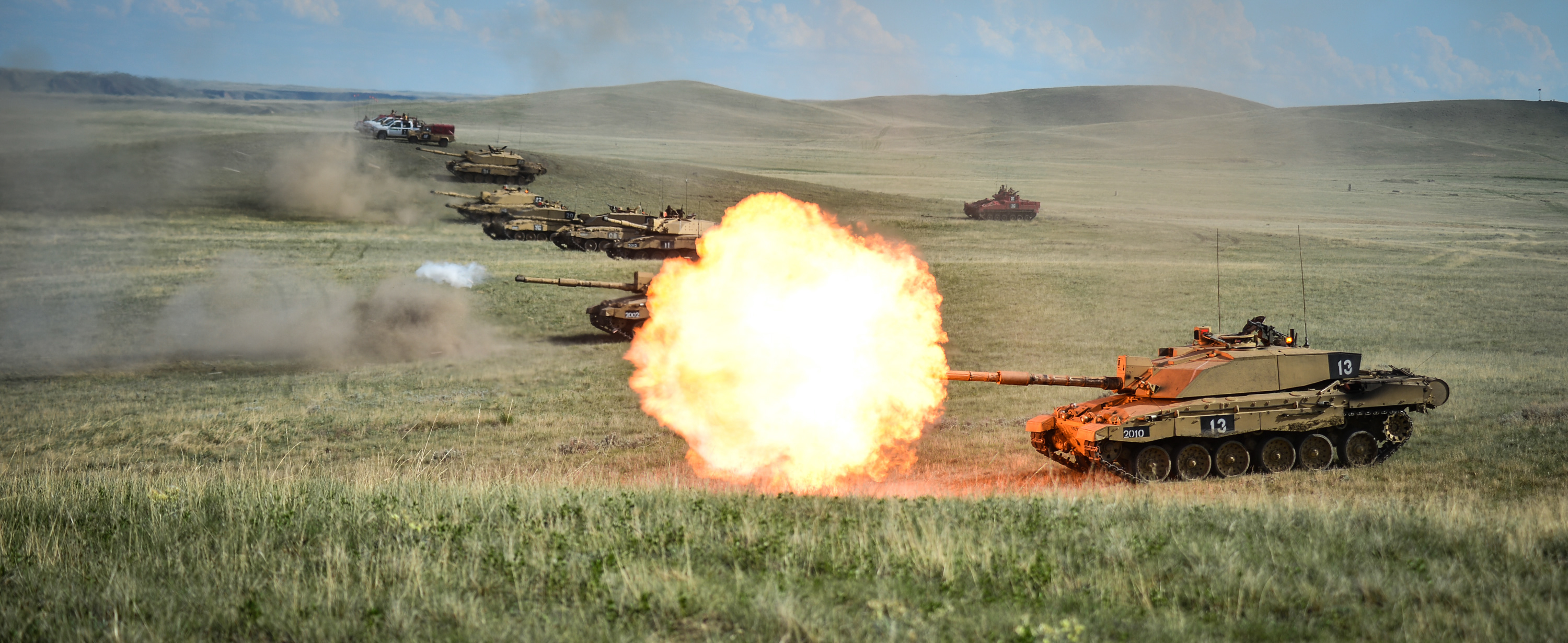
British Army Challenger 2 tanks at the British Army Training Unit Suffield (BATUS), an armoured training centre in Alberta, Canada.

CFB Suffield in Alberta, Canada, the largest military base operated by the Canadian Armed Forces, has hosted the British Army's largest armoured training centre, British Army Training Unit Suffield since 1971. Historically, the British military has also either operated or used several military facilities in Canada, with the Royal Air Force having previously trained its pilots at CFB Goose Bay from 1942 to 2005.

In modern times, both are members of the AUSCANNZUKUS military alliance, including the Five Eyes intelligence-sharing alliance with the United States, Australia, and New Zealand. Both countries are members of NATO and participate in UN peacekeeping operations. Before 2011, both countries' main areas of defence co-operation were in Afghanistan, where they were involved in its dangerous southern provinces. Both have provided air power to the NATO-led mission over Libya.

== Economic relations ==
Formal economic relations between the two countries declined after Britain acceded to the European Economic Community in 1973. In both countries, regional economic ties loomed larger than the historical trans-Atlantic ones. In 1988, Canada signed a free trade agreement with the United States, which became the North American Free Trade Agreement (NAFTA) in 1994 with the addition of Mexico. NAFTA became the Canada-United States-Mexico Agreement (CUSMA) in 2020 with the completion of negotiations.

Despite Canada's long-term shift towards proportionally more trade with the United States, Canada–British trade has continued to grow in absolute numbers. Britain is by far Canada's most important commercial partner in Europe and, from a global perspective, ranks third, after the United States and China. In 2010, total bilateral trade reached over 27.1 billion Canadian dollars, and for the last five years, Britain has been Canada's second-largest goods export market. Britain is the third source of foreign direct investment (FDI) in Canada after the United States and the Netherlands, and Canadian companies invest heavily in Britain. In 2010, the two-way stock of investment stood at almost C$115 billion.

On 9 February 2011, the boards of the London Stock Exchange and the Toronto Stock Exchange agreed to a deal in which both holding companies for the stock exchanges would merge, creating a leading exchange group with the largest number of listed companies in the world, and a combined market capitalization of £3.7 trillion (C$5.8 trillion). The merger was ultimately cancelled on 29 June 2011 when it became obvious that TMX shareholders would not give the needed two-thirds approval.

During the 2000s and 2010s, Canada and Britain worked together on negotiations towards a Comprehensive Economic and Trade Agreement (CETA) between Canada and the European Union. The agreement had been ratified by the European Parliament and came provisionally into force in 2017. The UK left the European Union at the end of January 2020, but continued to participate in the EU's trade agreements during a transition period that ended on 31 December 2020. In November 2020, the UK and Canada signed a continuity agreement to apply the terms of the EU-CA agreement to their bilateral trade. On 24 March 2022, Canada and the UK opened negotiations for a deeper and more comprehensive free trade agreement. The negotiations were paused by the UK in January 2023 over disagreements regarding the trade of beef and cheese. In March 2023, the UK concluded negotiations to accede to the free-trading CPTPP of which Canada was already an active member.

=== Tourism ===
In 2004, about 800,000 British residents visited Canada, the second-largest source of tourists in Canada, after the United States. The same year, British visitors spent almost C$1 billion while visiting Canada. Britain was the third international destination for Canadian tourists in 2003, after the United States and Mexico, with some 700,000 visitors spending over C$800 million.

== Cultural relations ==
Canada's cultural relations with the United Kingdom often compete against American cultural influences, as can be seen in Canadian English using spellings reminiscent of both British and American English.

=== Sports ===
In its early history, Canada maintained a link to the United Kingdom by playing cricket. Over time, however, Canada drifted more toward playing American sports, and even favoured the indigenous sport of lacrosse as a way to distance itself from British models, particularly as non-Anglo-Saxon immigration to Canada grew by the end of the 19th century.

In the 21st century, television and immigration have increased the extent to which British sports such as soccer and cricket are played or followed in Canada (see also: Commonwealth diaspora#Sports).

== Migration ==
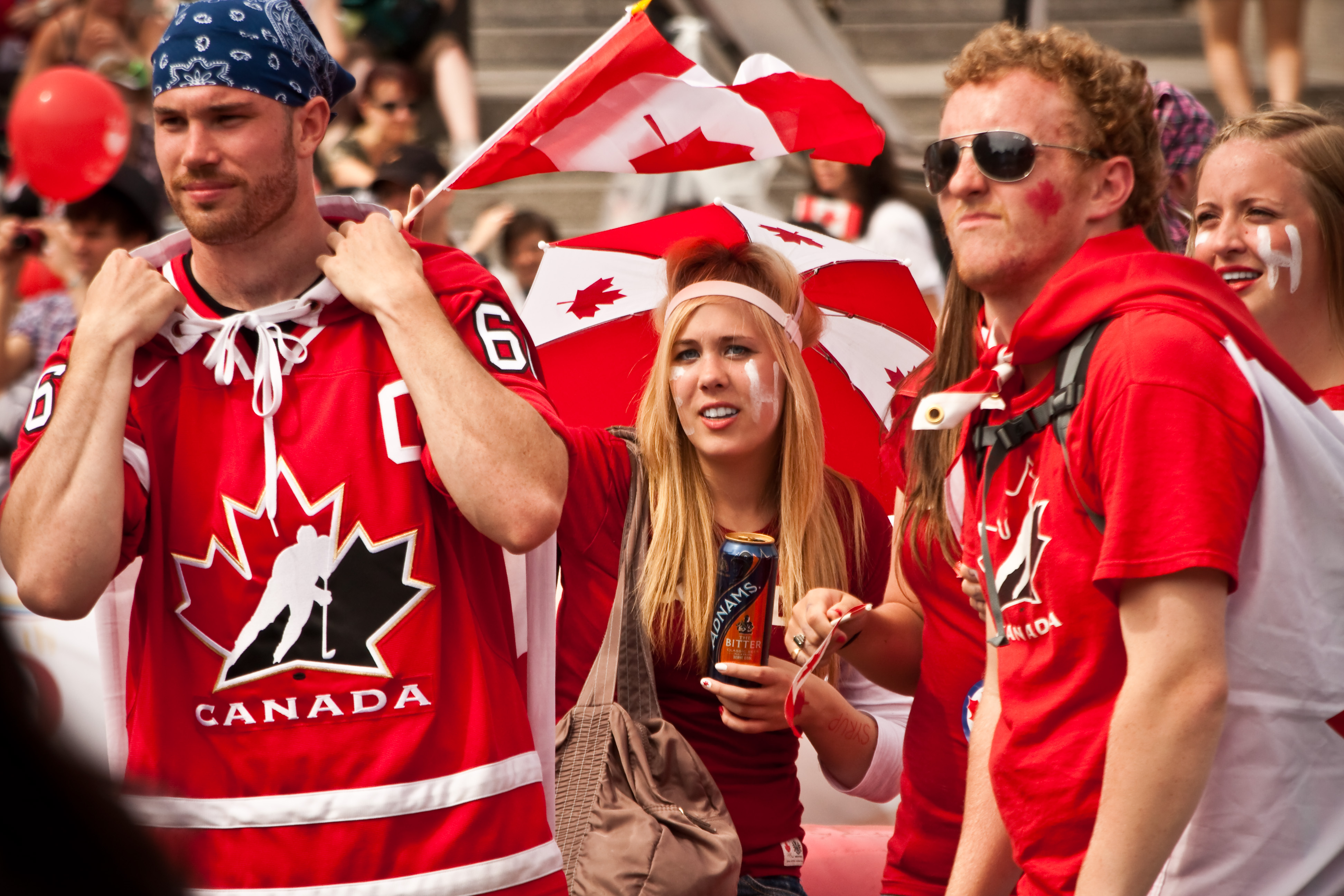
Canada Day celebrations in Trafalgar Square, London

From the conquest of New France to 1966, Britain remained one of Canada's largest sources of immigrants, usually the largest. Since 1967, when Canadian laws were changed to remove preferences that had been given to Britons and other Europeans, British migration to Canada has continued but at a lower level. When the constituent nations of the UK (England, Wales, Scotland, and Northern Ireland) are taken together, people of British ancestry still form Canada's largest ethnic group. In 2005, there were 579,620 UK-born people living in Canada, making up 1.9% of the population of Canada.

Historically, Canadians have travelled to Britain to advance their careers or studies to higher levels than could be done at home. Britain acted as the metropole to which Canadians gravitated, but that function has largely been reduced as the Canadian economy and institutions have developed. The Office for National Statistics estimates that in 2009, 82,000 Canadian-born people were living in Britain. In 2012, that was the third-largest community in the Canadian diaspora, after Canadians in the United States, and Canadians in Hong Kong.

In recent years, there has been growing support for the idea of freedom of movement between Britain, Canada, Australia, and New Zealand, with citizens able to live and work in any of the four countries, like the Trans-Tasman Travel Arrangement between Australia and New Zealand. The CANZUK organisation is a large promoter of this community concept and often cites significant support across each Commonwealth realm.

== Diplomacy ==
Canada and the United Kingdom share a head of state, Charles III.

The contemporary political relationship between London and Ottawa is underpinned by a robust bilateral dialogue at the head-of-government, ministerial, and senior official levels. As Commonwealth realms, the two countries share a monarch, King Charles III, and are both active members within the Commonwealth of Nations. In 2011, British Prime Minister David Cameron gave a joint address to the Canadian Parliament, and in 2013, Canadian Prime Minister Stephen Harper addressed both Houses of the British Parliament.

In recent years, Canada has sought closer Commonwealth cooperation, with the announcement in 2012 of joint diplomatic missions with the UK and of the intention of extending the scheme to include Australia and New Zealand, both of which share a head of state with Canada. In September 2012, Canada and the United Kingdom signed a Memorandum of Understanding on diplomatic co-operation, which promotes the co-location of embassies, the joint provision of consular services, and common crisis response. The project was criticized by some Canadian politicians as giving the appearance of a common foreign policy and was seen by some in the United Kingdom before BREXIT as an alternative and counterweight to EU integration which has now ceased.

Additionally, the Government of Quebec maintains a representative office in London.

== Opinion polls ==
In a 2019–2020 YouGov poll asking Britons their "favourite country", 80 per cent of respondents said they held positive opinions about Canada, more than any other country listed in the poll besides New Zealand, which also had 80 per cent of Britons say they held positive opinions of. A 2014 BBC World Service poll found that 85 per cent of Britons held a positive view on Canada's influence in the world; while 80 per cent of Canadians held a positive view on the UK's influence in the world.

In a Nanos Research opinion poll taken in 2019, more than 80 per cent of Canadians viewed the UK as a positive or somewhat positive partner for Canada, higher than any other country asked in the poll. Nanos Research conducted another survey asking the same question in 2021 and found similar results; with over 80 per cent of Canadians holding a positive or somewhat positive view of the UK, more than any other country asked in the poll. Other polling firms have also found that Canadians viewed the UK positively. In a Research Co. opinion poll conducted in 2020, 78% of Canadians said they held favourable views of the UK, higher than any country polled in the survey. Another 2020 poll taken by Angus Reid Institute found 83 per cent of Canadians held favourable views of UK, ahead of any other country in the poll.

== Resident diplomatic missions ==
of Canada in the United Kingdom

- London (High Commission)

of the United Kingdom in Canada

- Ottawa (High Commission)
- Calgary (Consulate-General)
- Montreal (Consulate-General)
- Toronto (Consulate-General)
- Vancouver (Consulate-General)

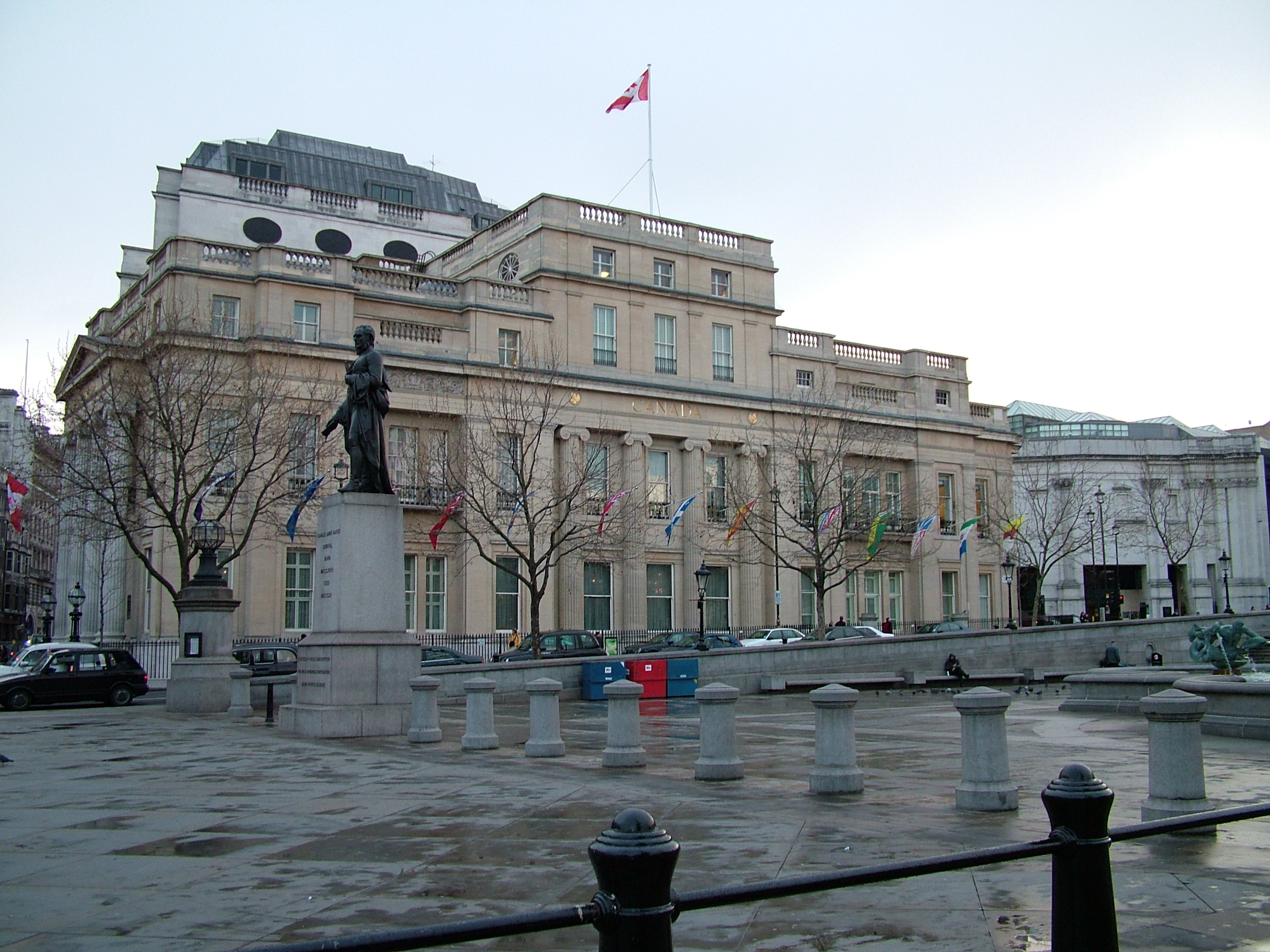
High Commission of Canada in London

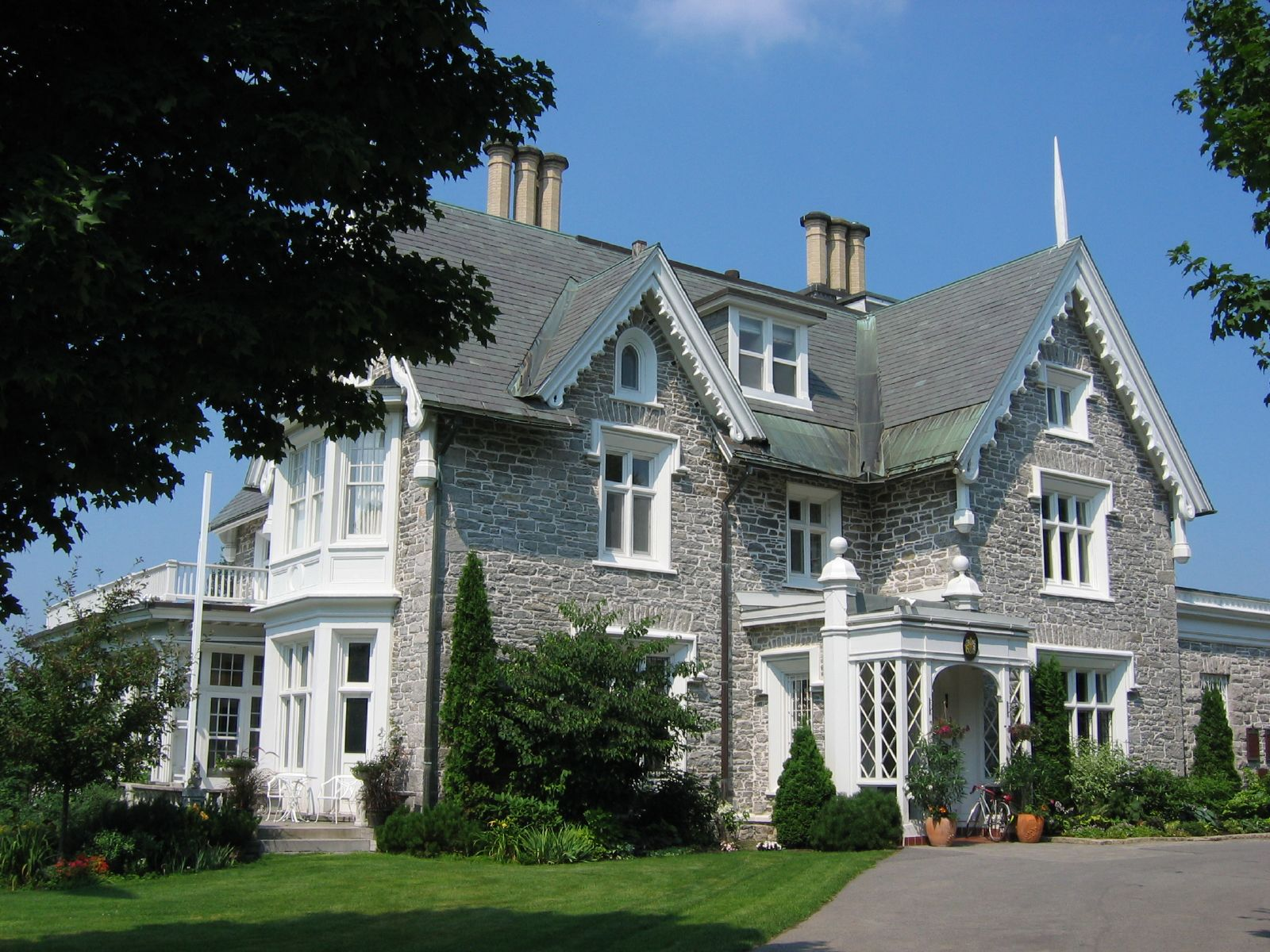
High Commission of the United Kingdom in Ottawa

== Twinnings ==
Several communities in Canada and the UK share a twinned cities agreement with one another. They include:

- (Wales) Bala, Gwynedd and Bala, Ontario
- (Scotland) Blairgowrie and Rattray, Perth and Kinross and Fergus, Ontario
- (Scotland) Comrie, Perth and Kinross and Carleton Place, Ontario
- (England) Coventry, West Midlands and Cornwall, Ontario
- (England) Coventry, West Midlands and (Quebec) Granby, Québec
- (England) Coventry, West Midlands and Windsor, Ontario
- (Scotland) Edinburgh, Lothian and Vancouver, British Columbia
- (England) Halifax, West Yorkshire and Halifax, Nova Scotia
- London, England and London, Ontario
- Liverpool, England and London, Ontario
- (Scotland) Perth, Perth and Kinross and Perth, Ontario
- (Scotland) Stirling, Stirlingshire and Summerside, Prince Edward Island
- (England) Truro, Cornwall and Truro, Nova Scotia

== See also ==
- Free trade agreements of Canada
- Free trade agreements of the United Kingdom
- History of Canadian foreign relations
- History of the foreign relations of the United Kingdom
- High Commission of Canada in London
- High Commission of the United Kingdom in Ottawa
- List of high commissioners of the United Kingdom to Canada
- List of high commissioners of Canada to the United Kingdom
- North Atlantic triangle
