= Peter Costello (author) =

Irish author (born 1946)

Peter Costello (born 3 April 1946) is an author and editor, described by the American critic Robert Hogan in the Greenwood Dictionary of Irish Literature as “a contemporary embodiment” of the “tradition in Irish literature of the independent scholar, who has an erudition embarrassing to the professional academic”.

== Personal life ==
Peter Costello is the youngest son of James C. Costello, a consulting engineer, later professor emeritus of architecture at the University of Michigan, and his wife Margaret. He was educated in Dublin by the Jesuits at Gonzaga College and graduated from the University of Michigan in 1969. After some years abroad in the United States of America, England, and elsewhere, he returned to Ireland in 1975. He now lives in Dublin, with frequent visits to France and other countries. He is married with two sons, one of whom is Patrick Costello, a former Green Party politician who served as a Teachta Dála (TD) for the Dublin South-Central constituency from 2020 to 2024.

== Work ==
He has written, edited, or contributed to some thirty-seven books, on subjects from Irish cultural, political and business histories, to books on animal mythology, research on the Piltdown Man hoax of 1912, and books on Jules Verne and Sir Arthur Conan Doyle.

His main field of interest is Irish literature and history. The Heart Grown Brutal (1977) provides “a learned but very readable study of writers who flourished from the death of Parnell to the death of Yeats, and which called attention to several significant figures outside the academic pantheon”. The novelist John Broderick, in reviewing the book, called it “this wise and often brilliant history”. Peter Costello is an internationally recognized authority on the life and times of James Joyce, on whom he has four books written: James Joyce (1980); Leopold Bloom: a biography (1981); James Joyce—The Years of Growth, 1882-1915 (1992); The Life of Leopold Bloom: a novel (1992); with John Wyse Jackson he is the author of a biography of James Joyce’s father John Stanislaus Joyce whose character was influential in both A Portrait of the Artist as a Young Man and Ulysses. He has also written a biography of Flann O'Brien, Flann O'Brien (1987), in collaboration with Peter van de Kamp, a Dutch academic.

His book The Real World of Sherlock Holmes when first published in 1991, was revised for republication in 2006 as Conan Doyle Detective, translations of which appeared in French and Spanish, with additional material. His theories about the identity of the Piltdown Man hoax, one of the greatest scientific frauds of all time, were published as articles in Antiquity, and are discussed by Professor Glyn Daniel in his memoirs Writing for Antiquity. He is currently Books Editor of The Irish Catholic, a national weekly newspaper published in Dublin.

== Cryptozoology ==
Peter Costello has also written in the field of cryptozoology, e.g. his In Search of Lake Monsters (1974), and The Magic Zoo: The Natural History of Imaginary Animals (1979). A second edition of In Search of Lake Monsters (1974), with a long introduction by Dr Bernard Heuvelmans, “the father of cryptozoology” was published in French in 1978. Alongside these Peter Costello has contributions on the subject over the years to journals and books.

His book In Search of Lake Monsters is an examination of unidentified swimming objects. Following on the work of Oudemans and Heuvelmans, he considered that these creatures were a type of giant long-necked seal. It was positively reviewed as "both scholarly and entertaining, avoiding the excesses of gullible monster-mania and blind disbelief."

== Selected publications ==
- 1974 In Search of Lake Monsters (Garnstone Press) hardback
- 1975 In Search of Lake Monsters (Panther) paperback
- 1977 Heart Grown Brutal: Irish Revolution in Literature from Parnell to the Death of Yeats, 1891-1939 (Gill & Macmillan)
- 1978 Jules Verne: Inventor of Science Fiction (Hodder & Stoughton) hardback
- 1979 The Magic Zoo: The Natural History of Fabulous Animals, (London: SphereBooks; New York: St. Martin's Press)
- 1980 James Joyce (Gill & Macmillan)
- 1981 Leopold Bloom: a biography (Gill & Macmillan)
- 1983 Jules Verne: Inventor of Science Fiction (New York: Scribner) paperback
- 1989 Dublin Churches (Gill & Macmillan)
- 1989 Clongowes Wood: a History of Clongowes Wood College, 1814-1989 (Gill & Macmillan)
- 1991 The Real World of Sherlock Holmes (Robinson)
- 1992 The Life of Leopold Bloom: a novel (Roberts Rinehart)
- 1992 “The very heart of the city”: The story of Denis Guiney and Clerys (Clery and Co.)
- 1996 Dublin Literary Pub Crawl (A. & A. Farmar)
- 1996 Liam O’Flaherty’s Ireland (Dublin: Wolfhound Press; US edition)
- 1998 Dublin Castle in the Life of the Irish Nation (Wolfhound / Merlin)
- 1998 John Stanislaus Joyce, with John Wyse Jackson (Fourth Estate)
- 1999 Dublin's Literary Pubs (2nd edition of 1996 book)
- 2001 The Irish 100 (British version, London)
- 2002 The Irish 100 (American version, New York)
- 2006 Conan Doyle: Detective (Robinson Publishing)
- 2008 Denis Guiney (UCD Press).
- 2010 Conan Doyle Detective, Paris: France Loisir. French hardback book club edition
