= Comprehensive Economic and Trade Agreement =

2016 Canada–EU free trade agreement

- Canada (orange) and the European Union (green)
- Type: Trade agreement
- Signed: 30 October 2016
- Location: Brussels, Belgium
- Effective: Not in force (but provisional application of most of the agreement)
- Condition: Approval by all signatories
- Provisional application: 21 September 2017
- Signatories: Canada; European Union; All EU member states
- Ratifiers: Canada received royal assent and 17 EU member States ratified
- Languages: All official languages of the EU and Canada: Bulgarian; Croatian; Czech; Danish; Dutch; English; Estonian; Finnish; French; German; Greek; Hungarian; Irish; Italian; Latvian; Lithuanian; Maltese; Polish; Portuguese; Romanian; Slovak; Slovene; Spanish; Swedish

The Comprehensive Economic and Trade Agreement (CETA; French: accord économique et commercial global, AECG; German: Umfassendes Wirtschafts- und Handelsabkommen) is a free-trade agreement between Canada and the European Union and its member states. It has been provisionally applied, thus removing 98% of the preexisting tariffs between the two sides.

The negotiations were concluded in August 2014. All 27 European Union member states and former member state United Kingdom approved the final text of CETA for signature, with Belgium being the final country to give its approval. Justin Trudeau, Prime Minister of Canada, travelled to Brussels on 30 October 2016 to sign on behalf of Canada. The European Parliament approved the deal on 15 February 2017. The agreement, being a mixed agreement, is subject to ratification by the EU and all EU member States in order to be fully applied. Until then, substantial parts are provisionally applied from 21 September 2017, excluding investment protection. After a challenge by Belgium, the European Court of Justice upheld the agreement on 30 April 2019, in its opinion 1/17, that the dispute resolution mechanism complies with EU law. As of November 2026, only 18 of 27 EU countries have ratified (as did the United Kingdom before leaving the EU), and Cyprus has voted against ratification.

== History ==
CETA is Canada's biggest bilateral initiative since NAFTA. It was started as a result of a joint study "Assessing the Costs and Benefits of a Closer EU-Canada Economic Partnership", which was released in October 2008. Officials announced the launch of negotiations on 6 May 2009 at the Canada-EU Summit in Prague. This, after the Canada-EU Summit in Ottawa on 18 March 2004 where leaders agreed to a framework for a new Canada-EU Trade and Investment Enhancement Agreement (TIEA). The TIEA was intended to move beyond traditional market access issues, to include areas such as trade and investment facilitation, competition, mutual recognition of professional qualifications, financial services, e-commerce, temporary entry, small- and medium-sized enterprises, sustainable development, and sharing science and technology.

The TIEA was also to build on a Canada-EU regulatory co-operation framework for promoting bilateral co-operation on approaches to regulatory governance, advancing good regulatory practices and facilitating trade and investment. In addition to lowering barriers, the TIEA was meant to heighten Canadian and European interest in each other's markets. The TIEA continued until 2006 when Canada and the EU decided to pause negotiations. This led to negotiations for a Canada-European Union trade agreement (later renamed the Comprehensive Economic and Trade Agreement, or CETA), and this agreement will go beyond the TIEA toward an agreement with a much broader and more ambitious scope.

An agreement in principle was signed by Canadian Prime Minister Stephen Harper and European Commission President José Manuel Barroso on 18 October 2013. The negotiations were concluded on 1 August 2014. The trade agreement was officially presented on 25 September 2014 by Harper and Barroso during an EU – Canada Summit at the Royal York Hotel in downtown Toronto. The Canada Europe Roundtable for Business has served as the parallel business process from the launch to the conclusion of the CETA negotiations.

After it had been leaked by German public television on 14 August, the 1634 pages long Consolidated CETA text was published on the EU's official website on 26 September 2014.

Completion, translation of the final text into 24 EU languages, and ratification is expected to take years since the passage of the deal requires approval of the European Parliament and the European Council as well as Canada and the individual 27 EU member states as well.

=== Considerations and planning ===
The EU-Canada Trade Sustainability Impact Assessment (SIA), a three-part study commissioned by the European Commission to independent experts and completed in September 2011, provided a comprehensive prediction on the impacts of CETA. It predicts a number of macro-economic and sector-specific impacts, suggesting the EU may see increases in real GDP of 0.02–0.03% in the long-term from CETA, whereas Canada may see increases of 0.18–0.36%; the Investment section of the report suggests these numbers could be higher when factoring in investment increases. At the sectoral level, the study predicts the greatest gains in output and trade to be stimulated by services liberalization and by the removal of tariffs applied on sensitive agricultural products; it also suggests CETA could have a positive social impact if it includes provisions on the ILO's Core Labour Standards and Decent Work Agenda. The study details a variety of impacts in various "cross-cutting" components of CETA: it advocates against controversial NAFTA-style ISDS provisions; predicts potentially imbalanced benefits from a government procurement (GP) chapter; assumes CETA will lead to an upward harmonization in IPR regulations, particularly changing Canadian IPR laws; and predicts impacts in terms of competition policy and several other areas.

The European Commission projected the treaty would lead to savings of just over half a billion euros in taxes for EU exporters every year, mutual recognition in regulated professions such as architects, accountants and engineers, and easier transfers of company staff and other professionals between the EU and Canada. The European Commission claims CETA will create a more level playing field between Canada and the EU on intellectual property rights.

=== Legal challenges ===
==== Germany ====
In Germany, a constitutional complaint made by more than 125,000 people had the Federal Constitutional Court (13 October 2016) examine whether its provisional applicability was compatible with the German Basic Law. The Federal Constitutional Court confirmed this in principle; however, the federal government must ensure

- that a Council decision on the provisional application will only include those areas of CETA that are undisputedly within the competence of the European Union,
- that until a decision by the Federal Constitutional Court is made, the main thing is that the decisions taken in the CETA Joint Committee will be adequately democratically linked, and that
- the interpretation of Art. 30.7 para. 3 letter c CETA enables a unilateral termination of the provisional application by Germany.

A ratification vote by the Bundestag and Bundesrat would not take place before the Federal Constitutional Court judgment as taken place. In March 2022, the court approved the provisional application of the agreement but indicated that provisions concerning arbitral tribunals might be unconstitutional.

In June 2022, Germany's governing coalition agreed to ratify the agreement after the noted provisions on arbitral tribunals are renegotiated and adjusted to address the concerns of the Federal Constitutional Court. The planned changes would not require renewed ratification of the agreement by all states.

In December 2022, the Bundestag and Bundesrat ratified the agreement. In January 2023, the ratification law entered into force.

==== Belgium ====
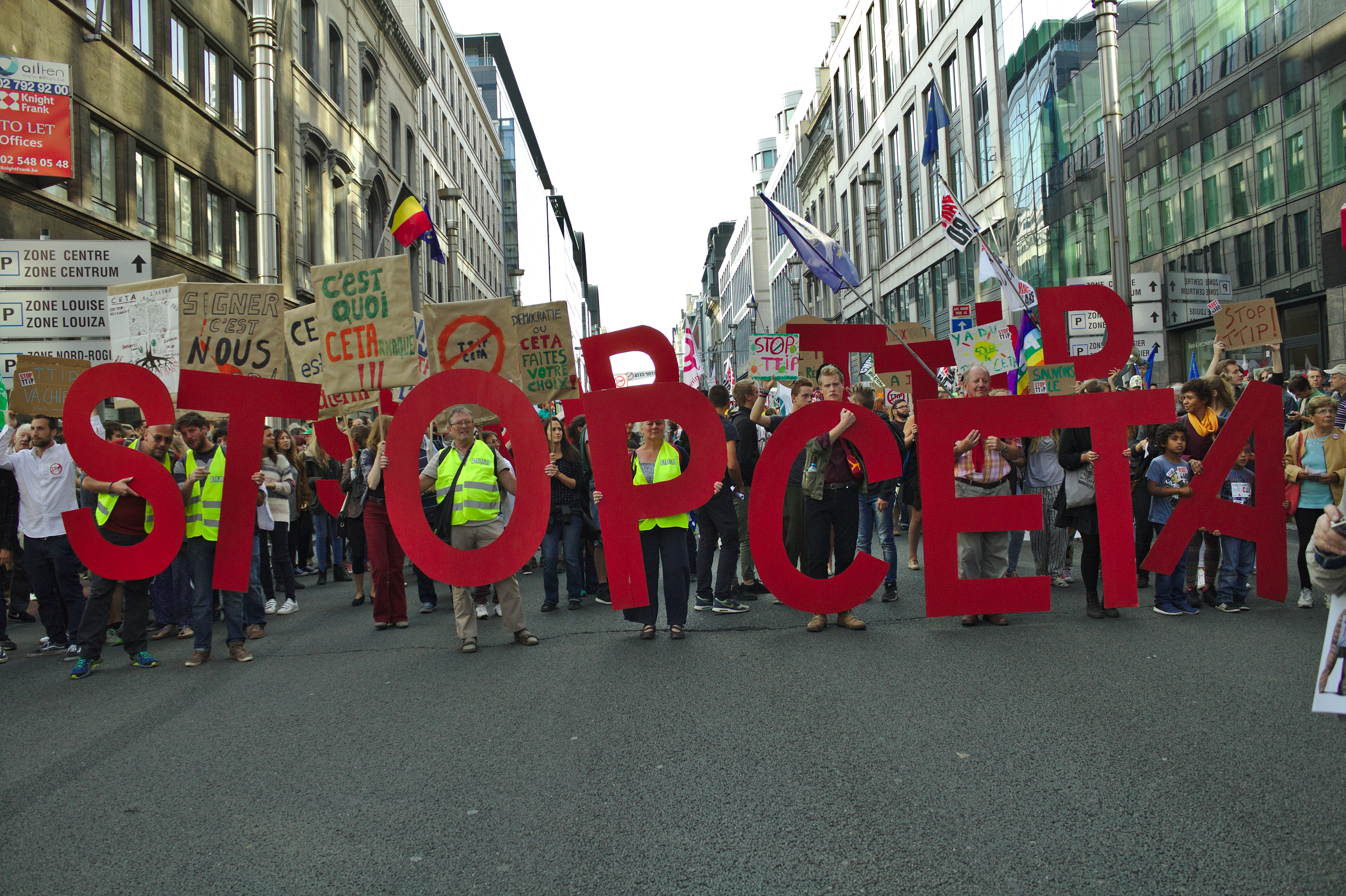
The Stop TTIP-CETA protest in Brussels, Belgium, 20 September 2016

In September 2017, Belgium requested the opinion of the European Court of Justice on whether the dispute resolution system of CETA is compatible with EU law. The agreement could not come into force until the ECJ had given its opinion nor if the ECJ opinion were to be that CETA is incompatible with EU law. On 30 April 2019, the European Court of Justice gave its opinion that the system for the resolution of disputes between investors and states in CETA is compatible with EU law.

==== Ireland ====
In September 2021, under Costello v. Government of Ireland, the Irish High Court rejected a challenge brought against ratification of the treaty by Green Party member of parliament, Patrick Costello.

The judge, Nuala Butler, found that CETA did not entail an unconstitutional transfer of the State's sovereignty. She also found that tribunals established by CETA would not have jurisdiction to declare any provision of Irish law invalid. In addition she found that it was constitutionally appropriate and permissible for the State to ratify the agreement without a referendum.

In January 2022, the Supreme Court allowed direct appeal of this judgment to itself, bypassing the Court of Appeal in a "leapfrog" appeal due to "significant issues" regarding state sovereignty and the administration of justice raised in the case. This appeal began being heard in March 2022.

In November 2022, the Supreme Court upheld the challenge, finding by a 4-3 majority that ratification of CETA would be unconstitutional as Irish law currently stands. The Court however also found that if amendments were made to existing Irish law, it would then be constitutional to ratify CETA. Specifically, amendments to the Arbitration Act of 2010 could be made by the Oireachtas without the need for a referendum to allow ratification without breaching the constitution.

In June 2026, the president of Ireland signed into law the Arbitration (Amendment) Act 2026, clearing the way for the ratification of CETA and other similar international agreements.

=== Visa disputes ===
The Czech Republic, Romania and Bulgaria had declared they would not endorse the agreement, in effect scuppering the entire agreement, until the visa requirements for their citizens entering Canada were lifted. All other EU countries already had visa free travel to Canada. Visas requirements were lifted for the Czech Republic on 14 November 2013. After giving a written undertaking to cancel visa requirements for Bulgarian and Romanian nationals visiting Canada for business and tourism, within a timeframe no later than the end of 2017, Canada lifted visa requirements for Bulgarian and Romanian citizens on 1 December 2017.

== Current status ==
Canada and the EU have a long history of economic co-operation. Comprising 27 Member States with a total population of over 450 million and a GDP of €41.6 trillion in 2025, the European Union (EU) is the world's second largest single market, foreign investor and trader. As an integrated bloc, the EU represents Canada's second largest trading partner in goods and services. In 2024, Canadian goods and services exports to the EU totalled €48.3 billion and imports from the EU amounted to €76.3 billion.

According to Global Affairs Canada, the EU is also the second largest source of foreign direct investment (FDI) in Canada, with the stock of FDI amounting to C$194 billion at the end of 2024. In 2024, the stock of Canada's direct investment in the EU totalled C$297 billion, with Canadian companies generating 275,000 jobs in EU Member States. According to Eurostat, the EU identified Canada as its sixth largest destination and its fifth largest source of FDI in 2024.

As of 2026, CETA is provisionally in effect, with full ratification pending in 10 of the EU's 27 member states. In March 2026, in response to concerns about the impact of investor-state dispute mechanisms on state sovereignty and after designing a tribunal system in 2021, the CETA Joint Committee issued "relatively narrow interpretations of CETA’s investor protections" by clarifying the definitions of "fair and equitable treatment" and "indirect expropriation."

== Accessions ==
=== Signature and ratification ===
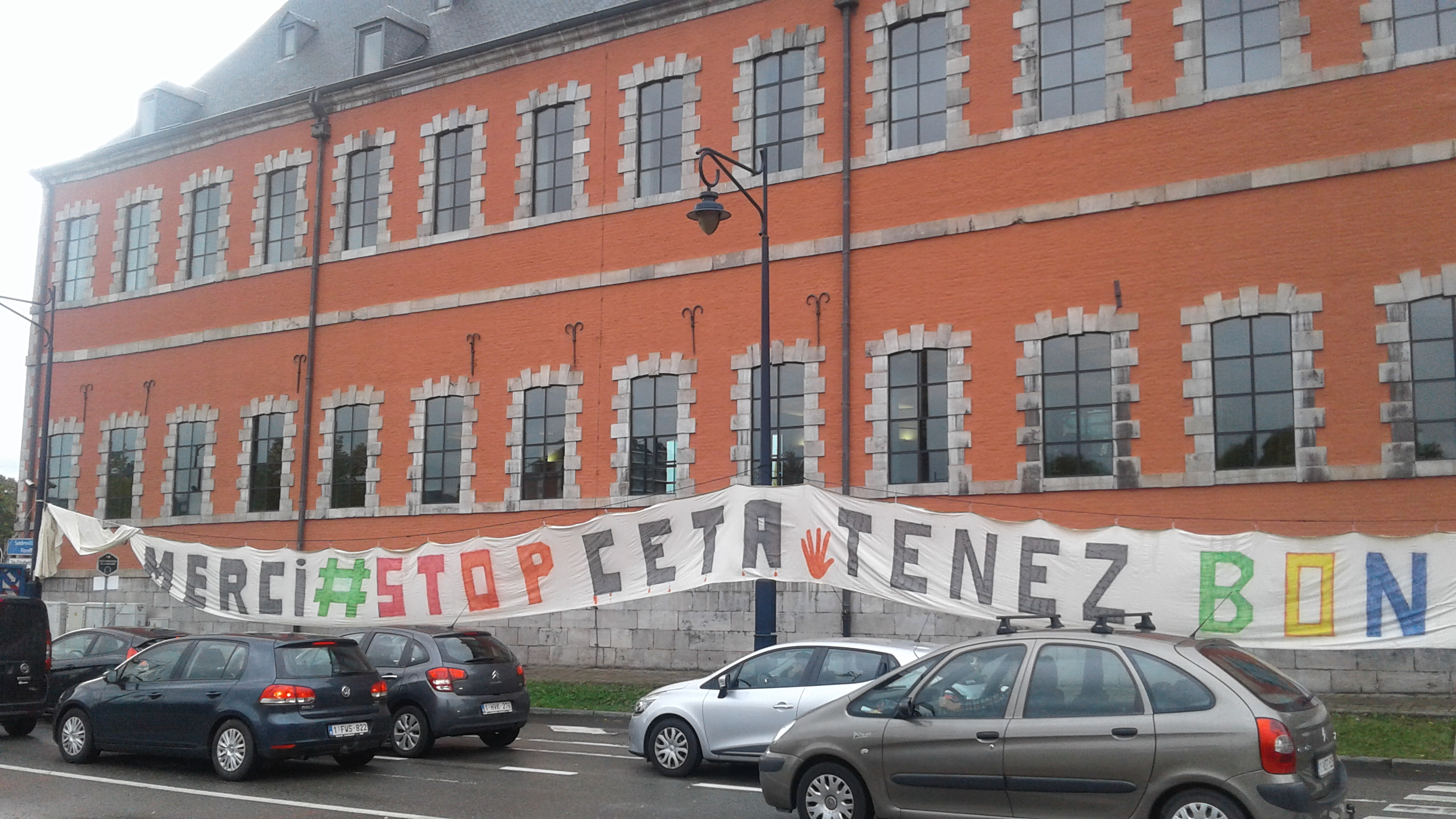
Banner opposing CETA at the Walloon Parliament in Namur on 19 October 2016.

It was initially unclear whether or not the EU member states would have to ratify the agreement, as the European Commission considered the treaty to be solely in the competence of the EU. However, in July 2016 it was decided that CETA be qualified as a "mixed agreement" and thus be ratified through national procedures as well.

Shortly before the scheduled signature of CETA on 27 October 2016, Belgium announced it was unable to sign the treaty, as assent was required by all regional governments. The federal government and Flanders, which were governed by the centre-right Michel and Bourgeois governments respectively, were in favour, whereas the German Community, French Community, Wallonia and Brussels, which were led by centre-left parties that were in opposition at the federal level, rejected the treaty. On 27 April 2016, the Walloon Parliament had already adopted a resolution in opposition to CETA. On 13 October 2016, David Lametti, then Canada's Justice Minister, defended CETA before a Walloon Parliament committee. However, the next day the Walloon Parliament affirmed its opposition. Walloon Minister-President Paul Magnette led the intra-Belgian opposition shortly before the planned signature.

The intra-Belgian disagreement was solved in the final days of October, paving the way for CETA's signature. On 28 October, the Belgian regional parliaments allowed Full Powers to be given to the federal government, and the following day Minister of Foreign Affairs Didier Reynders gave his signature on behalf of Belgium. The next day, on Sunday 30 October 2016, the treaty was signed by Canadian Prime Minister Justin Trudeau, President of the European Council Donald Tusk, President of the European Commission Jean-Claude Juncker and Slovak Prime Minister Robert Fico (as Slovakia held the Presidency of the Council of the European Union in the second half of 2016).

Following the signature, the consent by the European Parliament and the ratification by Canada, CETA applies provisionally since 21 September 2017, awaiting its ratification by the European Union member states, the European Union and Canada. The procedure is completed when the instrument of ratification is deposited and in many countries requires parliamentary approval.

As of August 2023, eighteen EU states have deposited their instruments of ratification: Austria, Croatia, Czech Republic, Denmark, Estonia, Finland, Germany, Latvia, Lithuania, Luxembourg, Malta, Netherlands, Portugal, Romania, Slovakia, Slovenia, Spain, and Sweden. The parliament of Cyprus voted against ratification on 31 July 2020.

Ratification status (as of October 2026)
Country	Ratification	Notification date	Notes
Canada	Yes	—	The Canadian Parliament's bill on CETA, Bill C-30, received Royal Assent on 16 May 2017. The Canadian government had indicated that the agreement would be ratified on or before 1 July 2017; however, dispute with the EU regarding details of implementation has delayed the ratification date. After rounds of extensive discussions, the two sides announced that CETA will be provisionally applied on 21 September 2017, nearly three months later than the anticipated date of implementation.
European Union	Yes	—	The European Parliament approved the agreement on 15 February 2017.
Austria	Yes	2019-05-23	
Belgium	Pending		Since CETA was designated a 'mixed agreement', all five subnational parliaments of Belgium need to ratify it. In June 2018, the Flemish parliament, shared by both the Flemish Region and the Flemish Community approved the agreement. A month later, the national parliament also approved. The Parliament of the French Community and Parliament of Wallonia originally voted to reject in 2016 but re-voted to approve in June 2026. Both the Parliament of the German-speaking Community and Parliament of the Brussels-Capital Region also voted to reject in 2016 but have yet to revisit the issue.
Bulgaria	Pending		
Croatia	Yes	2017-11-09	The Croatian parliament, the Sabor, ratified the agreement on 30 June 2017.
Cyprus	No		The Cypriot parliament voted against ratification on 31 July 2020.
Czechia	Yes	2017-11-16	The Czech parliament's upper house, the Senate of the Czech Republic, ratified the agreement on 20 April 2017 and the Czech parliament's lower house, the Chamber of Deputies, ratified the agreement on 13 September 2017.
Denmark	Yes	2017-06-01	The Danish parliament, the Folketing, ratified the agreement on 1 June 2017.
Estonia	Yes	2017-11-10	
Finland	Yes	2019-01-03	
France	Pending		The French Parliament's lower house, the National Assembly, ratified the agreement on 23 July 2019. But the upper house, the Senate, voted against it on 21 March 2024, putting the ratification process at risk.
Germany	Yes	2023-08-09	The German Bundestag voted 559-110 to ratify CETA on 1 December 2022. The German Bundesrat ratified the agreement on 16 December 2022. The ratification law entered into force on 20 January 2023.
Greece	Pending		
Hungary	Pending		
Ireland	Pending		Supreme Court upheld challenge to ratification. However, those legal issues has since been addressed by an amendment to Irish law that became law in June 2026.
Italy	Pending		
Latvia	Yes	2017-03-09	The Latvian parliament, the Saeima, ratified the agreement on 23 February 2017.
Lithuania	Yes	2018-05-17	The Lithuanian parliament, the Seimas, ratified the agreement on 24 April 2018.
Luxembourg	Yes	2020-06-10	The Luxembourg parliament ratified the agreement on 6 May 2020.
Malta	Yes	2017-07-26	
Netherlands	Yes	2022-11-23	Tweede Kamer approved the law approving the agreement on 18 February 2020 and the Eerste Kamer on 12 July 2022.
Poland	Pending		
Portugal	Yes	2018-01-31	The Portuguese parliament, the Assembleia da República, ratified the agreement on 20 September 2017.
Romania	Yes	2020-12-02	
Slovakia	Yes	2019-11-28	The Slovak parliament ratified the agreement on 26 September 2019.
Slovenia	Yes	2026-11-05	The Slovene National Assembly ratified the agreement on 1 October 2026.
Spain	Yes	2017-12-13	The Spanish parliament, the Cortes Generales, ratified the agreement on 29 June 2017.
Sweden	Yes	2018-10-09	
United Kingdom	Yes	2018-11-08	Left the European Union on 31 January 2020.

== Objectives and role ==
=== Agricultural ===
CETA does not necessarily alter EU non-tariff barriers such as European regulations on beef, which include a ban on the use of growth hormones, but it could do so. Given the cooperation mechanisms institutionalized through the Agreement, this cannot be ruled out. Canadian stakeholders have criticized the EU's delays in the approval process for genetically modified organisms (GMOs), and GMO traceability and labelling requirements, none of which are addressed in CETA.

=== Environmental ===
Both the EU and Canada will retain the right to regulate freely in areas of public interest such as environmental protection, or people's health and safety.

=== Impact on blue economy and fisheries ===
The provincial Government of Newfoundland and Labrador has argued that the Federal Government of Canada in Ottawa reneged on a deal to pay $280 million in exchange for its relinquishment of minimum processing requirements as part of CETA. Those rules helped protect jobs in fish plants, especially in rural areas hit hard by the cod moratorium, which was instituted in 1992.

== Legal provisions ==
=== Copyright and intellectual property provisions ===
Many of its provisions on copyright were initially thought to be identical to the controversial ACTA, which was rejected by the European Parliament in 2012. The European Commission has indicated that this is not the case.

Part of the Agreement is stricter enforcement of intellectual property, including liability for Internet service providers, a ban on technologies that can be used to circumvent copyright. After failure of ACTA the copyright language in CETA was substantially watered down. The following provisions remain:

- WIPO ratification. The EU asked that Canada respect the rights and obligations under the WIPO Internet treaties. The EU only formally ratified those treaties in the week of 16 December 2009.
- Anti-circumvention provisions. The EU asked that Canada implement anti-circumvention provisions that include a ban on the distribution of circumvention devices. There is no such requirement in the WIPO Internet treaties.
- ISP Liability provisions. The treaty requires both EU and Canada to enact safe harbor statutory provisions that would limit ISPs liability where they act as mere conduits, cache content, or host content. These protections may not be conditioned on service providers monitoring their service for possible infringements.
- Enforcement provisions. The EU asked that Canada establish new enforcement provisions including measures to preserve evidence, ordering alleged infringers to disclose information on a wide range of issue[s], mandate disclosure of banking information in commercial infringement cases, allow for injunctive relief, and destruction of goods. There is also a full section on new border measures requirements.
- Making available or distribution rights. The EU asked that Canada implement a distribution or making available right to copyright owners.

These are just the copyright provisions. There are sections dealing with patents, trademarks, designs, and (coming soon) geographical indications. These include:

- requiring Canada to comply with the Trademark Law Treaty (Canada was not a contracting party until 2019)
- requiring Canada to accede to the Hague System for the International Registration of Industrial Designs (Canada joined in 2018)
- creating new legal protections for registered industrial designs including extending the term of protection from the current 10 years to up to 25 years
- requiring Canada to comply with the Patent Law Treaty (Canada had signed in 2001 but not implemented until 2019)
- requiring Canada to establish enhanced protection for data submitted for pharmaceutical patents.

— Dr Michael Geist, Canada Research Chair in Internet and E-commerce Law, University of Ottawa

On 22 October 2012, five Polish NGOs criticized the secrecy surrounding the negotiations, the similarities to ACTA, and demanded more disclosures about the negotiations from the Polish government.

In the Consolidated CETA Text a long section on "Intellectual Property Rights", IPR, (pp. 339–375) deals comprehensively with copyrights, trademarks, patents, designs, trade secrets and licensing. Here reference is made to the TRIPS agreement (p. 339 f). In addition to the interests of the pharmaceutical and software industries CETA encourages to prosecute "Camcording" (the so-called "film piracy", Art. 5.6, p. 343). Especially the negotiations on food exports lasted very long. The interests connected with European cheese exports and Canadian beef exports led to a protection of these kinds of intellectual properties and long lists of "Geographical Indications Identifying a Product Originating in the European Union" (pp. 363–347).

=== Investment protection and investor-state-tribunals ===
Section 4 of CETA (pages 158–161) provides Investment Protection to foreign investors, and guarantees a "fair and equitable treatment and full protection and security".

CETA allows foreign corporations to sue states before arbitral tribunals if they claim to have suffered losses because a state had violated its Non Discriminatory Treatment obligations (CETA, section 3, p 156 f) or because of a violation of the guaranteed investment protection.

This provision operates only in one direction—states cannot sue companies in these investor–state arbitrations. Such investor complaints are nothing new under public international law (UNCTAD listed 514 such cases at the end of 2012, most involving investors from the United States, the Netherlands, Great Britain and Germany), but in the context of transatlantic trade and investment, this comprehensive system of parallel justice is new.

After much criticism of the hitherto often confidential arbitral proceedings, CETA now provides for a certain amount of transparency by declaring the UNCITRAL Rules on Transparency in Treaty-based Investor-State Arbitration applicable to all proceedings (article X.33: Transparency of proceedings, p. 174).

While there is no appeal mechanism against arbitration awards comparable to scrutiny of court judgments, awards made under CETA are subject to ICSID (International Centre for Settlement of Investment Disputes) annulment proceedings if the claim is brought under the ICSID Rules, or setting-aside proceedings if the claim is brought under the UNCITRAL Rules or any other rules the parties have agreed on. Only after time limits set for these review mechanisms have lapsed, is the tribunal's final award to "be binding between the disputing parties and in respect of that particular case". (article X.39: Enforcement of awards, p. 177)

On 26 March 2014, German Economics Minister Sigmar Gabriel wrote an open letter to EU Trade Commissioner Karel De Gucht, stating that investment protection was central sensitive point, which could in the end decide whether a transatlantic free trade agreement would meet with German approval. He further stated that investment arbitration was unnecessary between countries with well-developed legal systems.

The CETA "Investor-State Dispute Settlement" (ISDS) provisions could create a precedent for similar arrangements within TTIP. Furthermore, critics allege that CETA would allow US companies to sue EU states through Canadian subsidiaries.

In 2016, the EU Commission announced that it had agreed with the Canadian government to replace ad hoc arbitral tribunals in CETA with a permanent dispute settlement tribunal. The tribunal will consist of 15 members named by Canada and the EU, dealing with individual cases in panels of three. An appeals mechanism will be established to ensure "legal correctness" of awards. The tribunal's members may not appear as experts or party counsel in other investment cases.

== Receptions and analysis ==
Proponents of CETA emphasize that the agreement will boost trade between the EU and Canada and thus create new jobs, facilitate business operations by abolishing customs duties, goods checks, and various other levies, facilitate mutual recognition of diplomas and regulate investment disputes by creating a new system of courts. Opponents consider that CETA would weaken European consumer rights, including high EU standards concerning food safety, and criticize it as a boon only for big business and multinational corporations, while risking net-losses, unemployment, and environmental damage impacting individual citizens. The deal also includes a controversial investor-state dispute settlement mechanism which makes critics fear that multinational corporations could sue national governments for billions of dollars if they thought that the government policies had a substantially negative impact on their business.

A poll conducted by Angus Reid Institute in February 2017 concluded that 55 percent of Canadians supported CETA, while only 10 percent opposed it. The support, however, had waned when compared to the poll conducted in 2014. In contrast, the North American Free Trade Agreement (NAFTA) had a 44 percent support rate among Canadians in February 2017. In contrast to the agreement's reception in Canada, the agreement prompted protests in a number of European countries.

== See also ==
- Canada–European Union relations
- Canada–European Free Trade Association Free Trade Agreement
- Canada–UK Trade Continuity Agreement
- EU–UK Trade and Cooperation Agreement
- Rules of Origin
- Trade unions in Europe
- Trade unions in Canada
- Free trade agreements of Canada
- Free trade agreements of the European Union
- Free trade agreements of the United Kingdom
- Free-trade area
- Transatlantic Trade and Investment Partnership (TTIP)
