= Jamaica–United Kingdom relations =

- Jamaica: United Kingdom

Diplomatic mission
- High Commission of Jamaica, London: High Commission of the United Kingdom, Kingston

British Prime Minister Andy Burnham with Jamaican Prime Minister Andrew Holness at a Commonwealth summit in Antigua, November 2026

Jamaica and the United Kingdom established diplomatic relations on 2 August 1962. Both countries are Commonwealth Realms.

Both countries share common membership of the Caribbean Development Bank, the Commonwealth, the International Criminal Court, and the World Trade Organization, as well as the CARIFORUM–UK Economic Partnership Agreement. Bilaterally the two countries have an Investment Agreement.

== History ==
The United Kingdom governed Jamaica as a colony for approximately 300 years after capturing the island from Spain in 1655. Jamaica developed into one of the most important colonies in the British West Indies, with a plantation economy centered on sugar production. During this period, large numbers of African slaves were brought to Jamaica, a process that had a significant influence on the formation of modern Jamaican society and culture.

Following the abolition of slavery throughout the British Empire in 1834, Jamaica underwent significant social and economic changes. Political reforms and the reorganization of local government institutions took place during the late nineteenth and early twentieth centuries, while demands for greater self-government gradually increased.

In 1944, Jamaica held its first general election based on universal adult suffrage, marking an important step in the development of self-government. Jamaica joined the West Indies Federation in 1958, but voted to withdraw from the federation in a 1961 referendum. Independence negotiations subsequently followed, and Jamaica gained independence from the United Kingdom on 6 August 1962.

The two countries established diplomatic relations on 2 August 1962, shortly before Jamaica's independence. Following independence, Jamaica retained the status of a Commonwealth realm with the British monarch as its head of state, and the two countries have continued to cooperate in the political, economic, and cultural spheres through the Commonwealth of Nations. The United Kingdom is also home to a substantial Jamaican diaspora community, which serves as an important foundation for people-to-people exchanges between the two countries.

== Economic relations ==
From 29 December 2008 until 30 December 2020, trade between Jamaica and the UK was governed by the CARIFORUM–European Union Economic Partnership Agreement, while the United Kingdom was a member of the European Union.

Following the withdrawal of the United Kingdom from the European Union, the UK and the CARIFORUM states signed the CARIFORUM–United Kingdom Economic Partnership Agreement on 22 March 2019. The CARIFORUM–UK Economic Partnership Agreement is a continuity trade agreement, based on the EU free trade agreement, which entered into force on 1 January 2021. Trade value between CARIFORUM states and the United Kingdom was worth £5,108 million in 2022.

== Diplomatic missions ==
- Jamaica maintains a high commission in London.
- The United Kingdom is accredited to Jamaica through its high commission in Kingston.

== See also ==
- Foreign relations of Jamaica
- Foreign relations of the United Kingdom
