= Guyana–United Kingdom relations =

- Guyana: United Kingdom

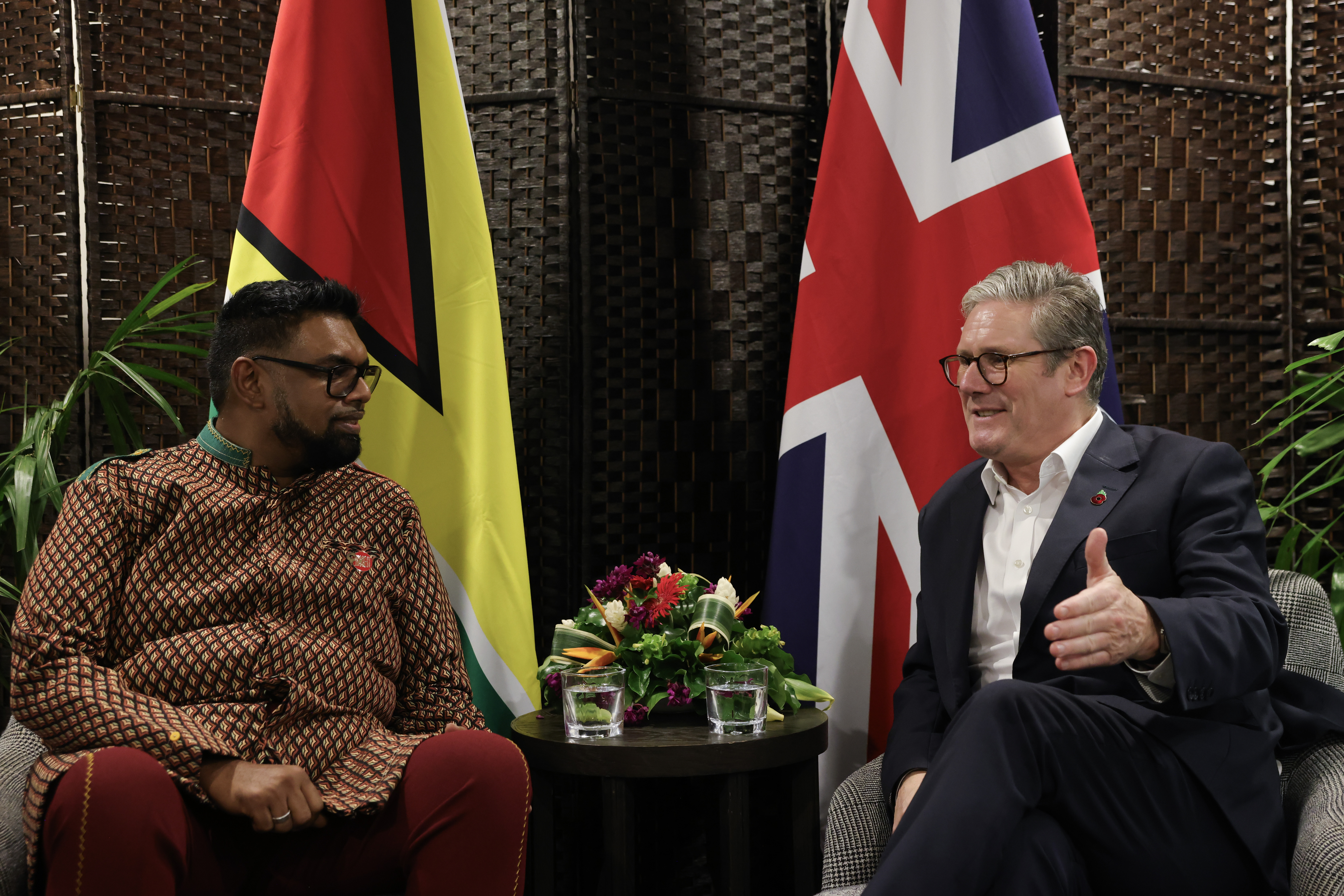
Guyanese President Irfaan Ali with British Prime Minister Keir Starmer at a Commonwealth summit in Apia, October 2024.

Guyana–United Kingdom relations encompass the diplomatic, economic, and historical interactions between the Co-operative Republic of Guyana and the United Kingdom of Great Britain and Northern Ireland. The two countries established diplomatic relations on 26 May 1966.

Both countries share common membership of the Atlantic Co-operation Pact, the Commonwealth, and the World Trade Organization, as well as the CARIFORUM–United Kingdom Economic Partnership Agreement. Bilaterally the two countries have a Double Taxation Convention, and an Investment Agreement.

== History ==
The UK governed Guyana from 1803 to 1966, when Guyana achieved full independence.

== Economic relations ==
From 29 December 2008 until 30 December 2020, trade between Guyana and the UK was governed by the CARIFORUM–European Union Economic Partnership Agreement, while the United Kingdom was a member of the European Union.

Following the withdrawal of the United Kingdom from the European Union, the UK and the CARIFORUM states signed the CARIFORUM–United Kingdom Economic Partnership Agreement on 22 March 2019. The CARIFORUM–UK Economic Partnership Agreement is a continuity trade agreement, based on the EU free trade agreement, which entered into force on 1 January 2021. Trade value between CARIFORUM states and the United Kingdom was worth £5,108 million in 2022.

== Resident diplomatic missions ==
- Guyana maintains a high commission in London.
- The United Kingdom is accredited to Guyana through its high commission in Georgetown.

== See also ==
- Foreign relations of Guyana
- Foreign relations of the United Kingdom
