= The Bahamas–United Kingdom relations =

Bilateral relations

Bahamas–United Kingdom relations

- Bahamas: United Kingdom

Diplomatic mission
- High Commission of The Bahamas, London: High Commission of the United Kingdom, Nassau

The Commonwealth of The Bahamas and the United Kingdom maintain diplomatic, economic, and historical interactions. Both countries established diplomatic relations upon the independence of the Bahamas on 10 July 1973. Both countries are Commonwealth Realms.

Both countries share common membership of the Caribbean Development Bank, the Commonwealth, the International Criminal Court, and the World Trade Organization, as well as the CARIFORUM–UK Economic Partnership Agreement. Bilaterally the two countries have a Tax Information Exchange Agreement.

== History ==
The UK governed the Bahamas from 1648 to 1973, when the Bahamas achieved full independence.

== Economic relations ==
From 29 December 2008 until 30 December 2020, trade between the Bahamas and the UK was governed by the CARIFORUM–European Union Economic Partnership Agreement, while the United Kingdom was a member of the European Union.

Following the withdrawal of the United Kingdom from the European Union, the UK and the CARIFORUM states signed the CARIFORUM–United Kingdom Economic Partnership Agreement on 22 March 2019. The CARIFORUM–UK Economic Partnership Agreement is a continuity trade agreement, based on the EU free trade agreement, which entered into force on 1 January 2021. Trade value between CARIFORUM states and the United Kingdom was worth £5,108 million in 2022.

== Diplomatic missions ==
- The Bahamas maintains a high commission in London.
- The United Kingdom is accredited to the Bahamas through its high commission in Nassau.

== See also ==
- British Bahamas
- Commonwealth of Nations
- Economic Partnership Agreements
- Foreign relations of the Bahamas
- Foreign relations of the United Kingdom
