= Belize–United Kingdom relations =

- Belize: United Kingdom

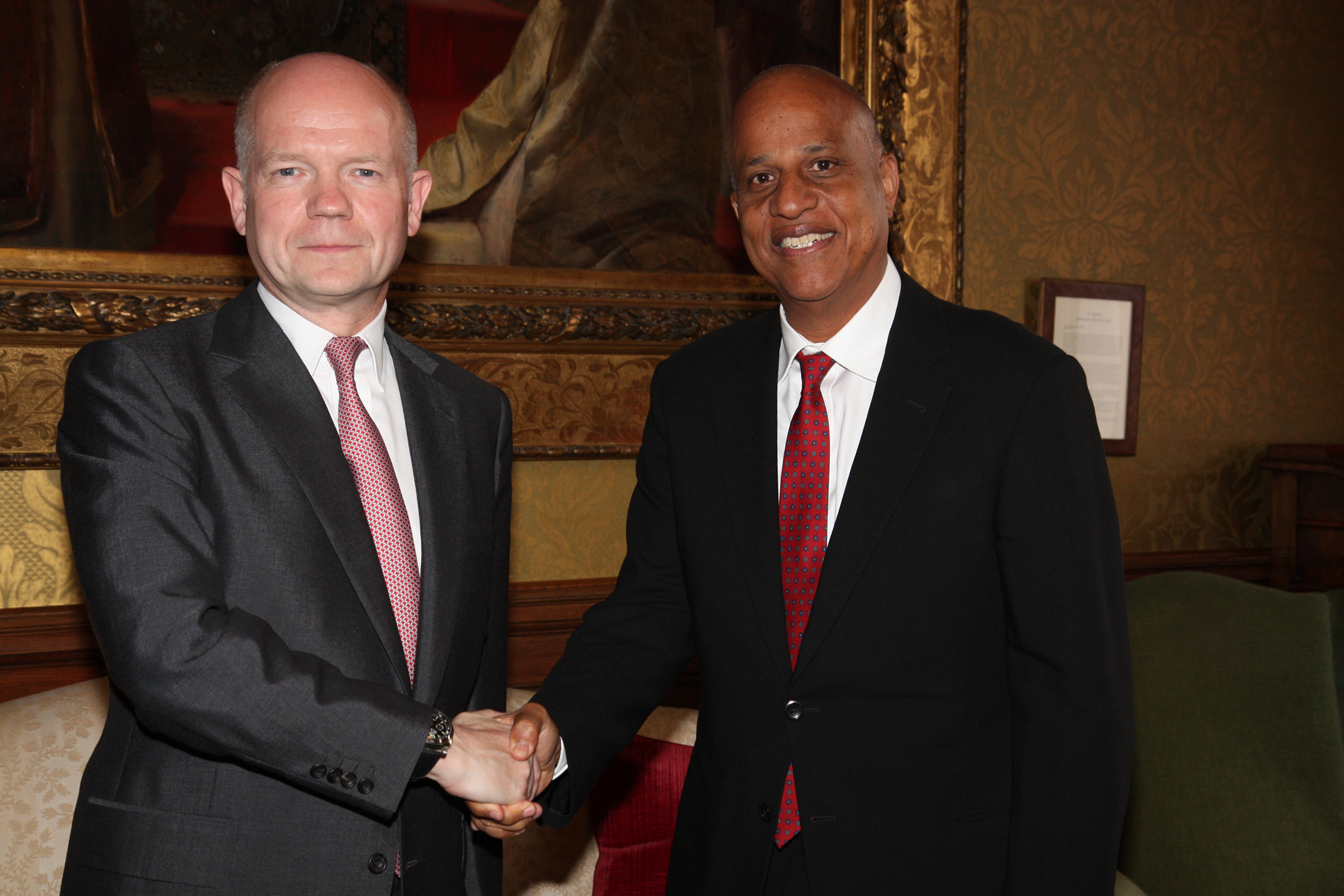
British Foreign Secretary William Hague with Belizean Prime Minister Dean Barrow in London, June 2013.

Belize–United Kingdom relations are the bilateral relations between Belize and the United Kingdom. The two countries established diplomatic relations on 21 September 1981. Both countries are Commonwealth Realms.

Both countries share common membership of the Atlantic Co-operation Pact, Caribbean Development Bank, the Commonwealth, and the World Trade Organization, as well as the CARIFORUM–United Kingdom Economic Partnership Agreement. Bilaterally the two countries have a Defence Cooperation Agreement, and an Investment Agreement.

== History ==
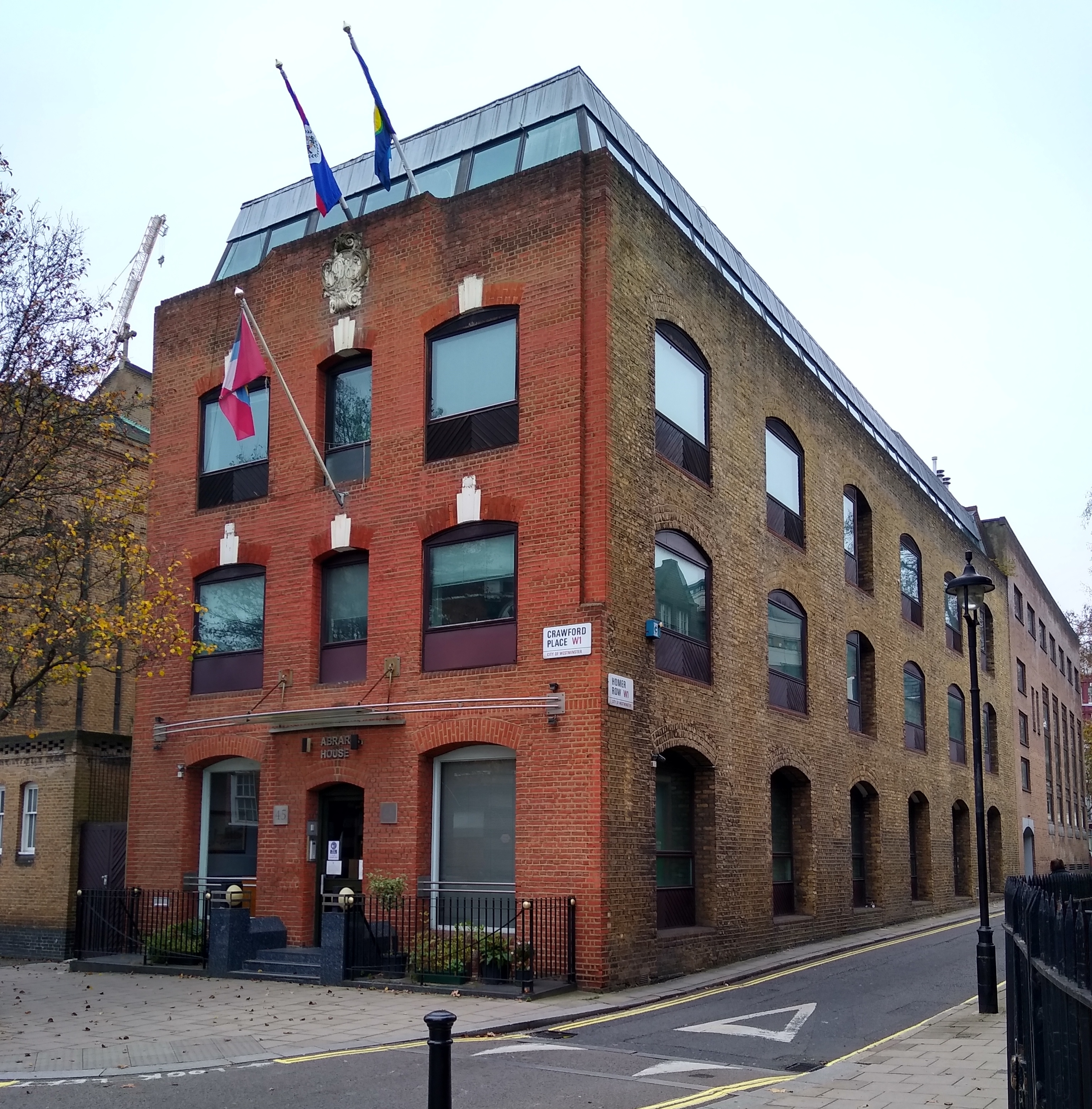
Belizean High Commission in London

The UK governed Belize for 200 years, from 1783 to 1981, when Belize achieved full independence.

Formerly known as British Honduras, the British maintained a garrison in Belize well into the 1990s, until Guatemala, which had always claimed sovereignty over Belize, signed a treaty recognizing Belize's independence.

Queen Elizabeth II visited Belize on two occasions. The first time was in October 1985 and the second time in February 1994. On 3 March 2012, Prince Harry visited Belize on a tour of Commonwealth countries in the region as the Queen's representative in her Diamond Jubilee, making this his first solo royal tour. There he renamed Zennia Boulevard (also known as Cohune Walk Boulevard) in the capital to "Her Majesty Queen Elizabeth II Boulevard", in honour of his grandmother.

== Economic relations ==
From 29 December 2008 until 30 December 2020, trade between the Belize and the UK was governed by the CARIFORUM–European Union Economic Partnership Agreement, while the United Kingdom was a member of the European Union.

Following the withdrawal of the United Kingdom from the European Union, the UK and the CARIFORUM states signed the CARIFORUM–United Kingdom Economic Partnership Agreement on 22 March 2019. The CARIFORUM–UK Economic Partnership Agreement is a continuity trade agreement, based on the EU free trade agreement, which entered into force on 1 January 2021. Trade value between CARIFORUM states and the United Kingdom was worth £5,108 million in 2022.

== Resident diplomatic missions ==
- Belize has a high commission in London.
- The United Kingdom has a high commission in Belmopan.

== See also ==
- CARIFORUM–United Kingdom Economic Partnership Agreement
- Foreign relations of Belize
- Foreign relations of the United Kingdom
- Belizean–Guatemalan territorial dispute
- British Army Training and Support Unit Belize
