= Suriname–United Kingdom relations =

- Suriname: United Kingdom

Suriname–United Kingdom relations encompass the diplomatic, economic, and historical interactions between the Republic of Suriname and the United Kingdom of Great Britain and Northern Ireland. Both countries established diplomatic relations on 31 March 1976.

Both countries share common membership of the Atlantic Co-operation Pact, the Caribbean Development Bank, the International Criminal Court, the United Nations, and the World Trade Organization, as well as the CARIFORUM–United Kingdom Economic Partnership Agreement.

== History ==
England governed Suriname from 1650 to 1667, when Suriname was ceded to the Netherlands. The UK occupied Suriname from 1799 until 1816.

== Economic relations ==
From 29 December 2008 until 30 December 2020, trade between Suriname and the UK was governed by the CARIFORUM–European Union Economic Partnership Agreement, while the United Kingdom was a member of the European Union.

Following the withdrawal of the United Kingdom from the European Union, the UK and the CARIFORUM states signed the CARIFORUM–United Kingdom Economic Partnership Agreement on 22 March 2019. The CARIFORUM–UK Economic Partnership Agreement is a continuity trade agreement, based on the EU free trade agreement, which entered into force on 1 January 2021. Suriname signed and acceded to the Economic Partnership Agreement on 5 March 2021. Trade value between CARIFORUM states and the United Kingdom was worth £5,108 million in 2022.

== Diplomatic missions ==
- Suriname does not maintain an embassy in the UK.
- The United Kingdom is not accredited to Suriname through an embassy; the UK develops relations through its high commission in Georgetown, Guyana.

== See also ==
- CARIFORUM–United Kingdom Economic Partnership Agreement
- Foreign relations of Suriname
- Foreign relations of the United Kingdom
- Member states of the Commonwealth of Nations
