= Papua New Guinea–United Kingdom relations =

- Papua New Guinea: United Kingdom

Diplomatic mission
- High Commission of Papua New Guinea, London: High Commission of the United Kingdom, Port Moresby

Envoy
- High Commissioner Betty Palaso: High Commissioner Anne Macro

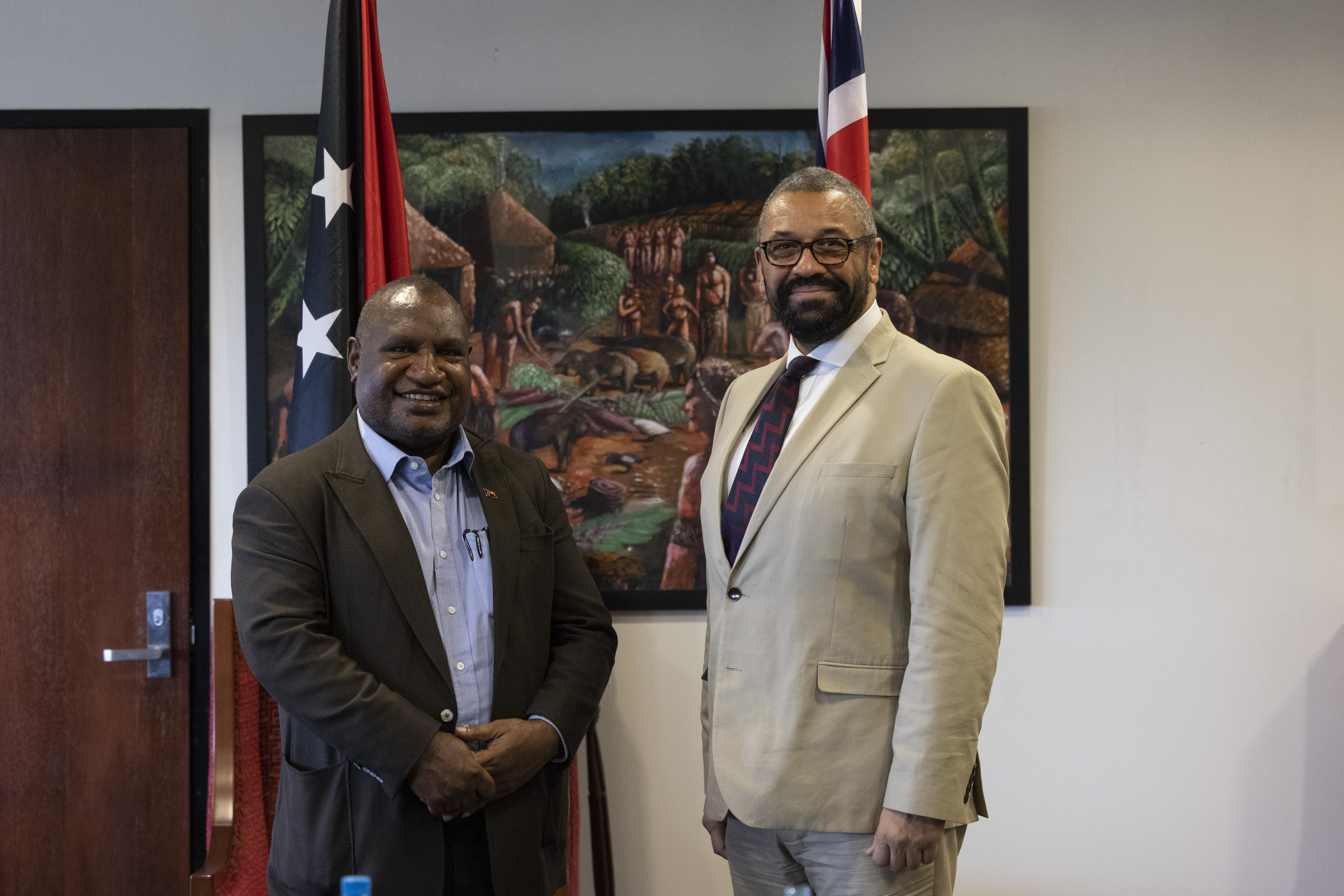
Papua New Guinean Prime Minister James Marape with British Foreign Secretary James Cleverly in Port Moresby, April 2023.

Papua New Guinea–United Kingdom relations are the bilateral relations between Papua New Guinea and the United Kingdom. Upon the independence of Papua New Guinea, both countries established diplomatic relations on 16 September 1975. Both countries are Commonwealth realms, meaning they share King Charles III as their head of state.

Both countries share common membership of the Commonwealth, the United Nations, and the World Trade Organization, as well as the Pacific States–United Kingdom Economic Partnership Agreement. Bilaterally the two countries have a Double Taxation Convention, an Investment Agreement, and a Security Agreement.

== History ==
The UK governed Papua New Guinea from 1884 until 1906, when the territory was transferred to Australia.

British involvement intensified on 6 November 1884, when the UK proclaimed a protectorate over the southeastern coast of the island of New Guinea. This move was heavily pushed by Australian colonies that feared the German Empire's simultaneous annexation of the northeastern coast (German New Guinea).

Administration of British New Guinea was transferred to the newly federated Commonwealth of Australia in 1906, eventually leading to the nation's full independence in 1975. Today, as fellow members of the Commonwealth, the United Kingdom and Papua New Guinea maintain formal diplomatic relations and share King Charles III as head of state.

== Economic relations ==
From 28 July 2014 until 30 December 2020, trade between Papua New Guinea and the UK was governed by the Pacific States–European Union Interim Partnership Agreement, while the United Kingdom was a member of the European Union.

Following the withdrawal of the United Kingdom from the European Union, Papua New Guinea and the UK signed the Pacific States–United Kingdom Economic Partnership Agreement on 14 March 2019. The Pacific States–United Kingdom Economic Partnership Agreement is a continuity trade agreement, based on the EU free trade agreement, which entered into force on 1 January 2021. Trade value between Pacific States and the United Kingdom was worth £286 million in 2022.

== Diplomatic missions ==
- Papua New Guinea maintains a high commission in London.
- The United Kingdom has a high commission in Port Moresby.

The current High Commissioner to Papua New Guinea is Anne Macro. The current High Commissioner to the United Kingdom is Betty Palaso.

== See also ==
- Foreign relations of Papua New Guinea
- Foreign relations of the United Kingdom
