= Dominica–United Kingdom relations =

- Dominica: United Kingdom

Diplomatic mission
- High Commission of Dominica, London: High Commission of the United Kingdom, Bridgetown

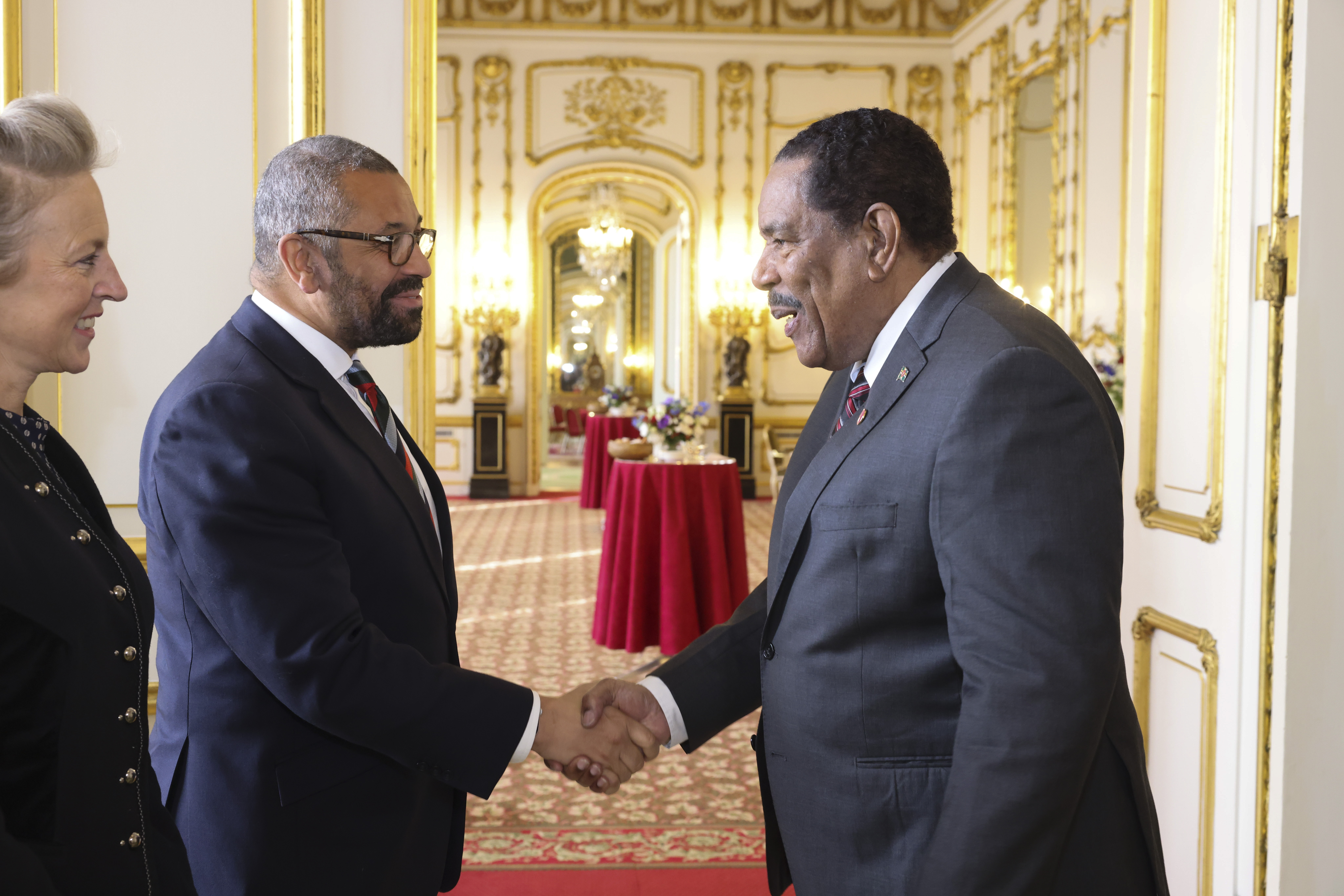
British Foreign Secretary James Cleverly with Dominican President Charles Savarin in Lancaster House, May 2023.

Dominica–United Kingdom relations are the foreign and bilateral relations between Dominica and the United Kingdom. Both countries are Commonwealth realms.

Both countries share common membership of the Atlantic Co-operation Pact, Caribbean Development Bank, the Commonwealth, the International Criminal Court, the United Nations, and the World Trade Organization, as well as the CARIFORUM–UK Economic Partnership Agreement. Bilaterally the two countries have a Tax Information Exchange Agreement, and an Investment Agreement.

== History ==
The UK governed Dominica from 1763 to 1978, when Dominica achieved full independence.

== Economic relations ==
From 29 December 2008 until 30 December 2020, trade between Dominica and the UK was governed by the CARIFORUM–European Union Economic Partnership Agreement, while the United Kingdom was a member of the European Union.

Following the withdrawal of the United Kingdom from the European Union, the UK and the CARIFORUM states signed the CARIFORUM–United Kingdom Economic Partnership Agreement on 22 March 2019. The CARIFORUM–UK Economic Partnership Agreement is a continuity trade agreement, based on the EU free trade agreement, which entered into force on 1 January 2021. Trade value between CARIFORUM states and the United Kingdom was worth £5,108 million in 2022.

== Diplomatic missions ==
- Dominica maintains a high commission in London.
- The United Kingdom is not accredited to Dominica through a high commission; the UK develops relations through its high commission in Bridgetown, Barbados.

== See also ==
- British West Indies
- Foreign relations of Dominica
- Foreign relations of the United Kingdom
- History of Dominica
- West Indies Associated States
- West Indies Federation
