= Fiji–United Kingdom relations =

- Fiji: United Kingdom

Diplomatic mission
- High Commission of Fiji, London: High Commission of the United Kingdom, Suva

Fiji–United Kingdom relations encompass the diplomatic, economic, and historical interactions between the Republic of Fiji and the United Kingdom of Great Britain and Northern Ireland. Both countries established diplomatic relations on 10 October 1970.

Both countries share common membership of the Commonwealth, the International Criminal Court, and the World Trade Organization, as well as the Pacific States–United Kingdom Economic Partnership Agreement. Bilaterally the two countries have a Double Taxation Convention.

== History ==
The UK governed Fiji from 1874 until 1970, when Fiji achieved full independence.

== Economic relations ==
From 28 July 2014 until 30 December 2020, trade between Fiji and the UK was governed by the Pacific States–European Union Interim Partnership Agreement, while the United Kingdom was a member of the European Union.

Following the withdrawal of the United Kingdom from the European Union, the UK and Fiji signed the Pacific States–United Kingdom Economic Partnership Agreement on 14 March 2019. The Pacific States–United Kingdom Economic Partnership Agreement is a continuity trade agreement, based on the EU free trade agreement, which entered into force on 1 January 2021. Trade value between Pacific States and the United Kingdom was worth £286 million in 2022.

== Diplomatic missions ==
- Fiji maintains a high commission in London.
- The United Kingdom is accredited to Fiji through its high commission in Suva.

== See also ==
- Fijians in the United Kingdom
- Foreign relations of Fiji
- Foreign relations of the United Kingdom
- Pacific States–United Kingdom Economic Partnership Agreement
