= Saint Lucia–United Kingdom relations =

- Saint Lucia: United Kingdom

Diplomatic mission
- High Commission of Saint Lucia, London: High Commission of the United Kingdom, Castries

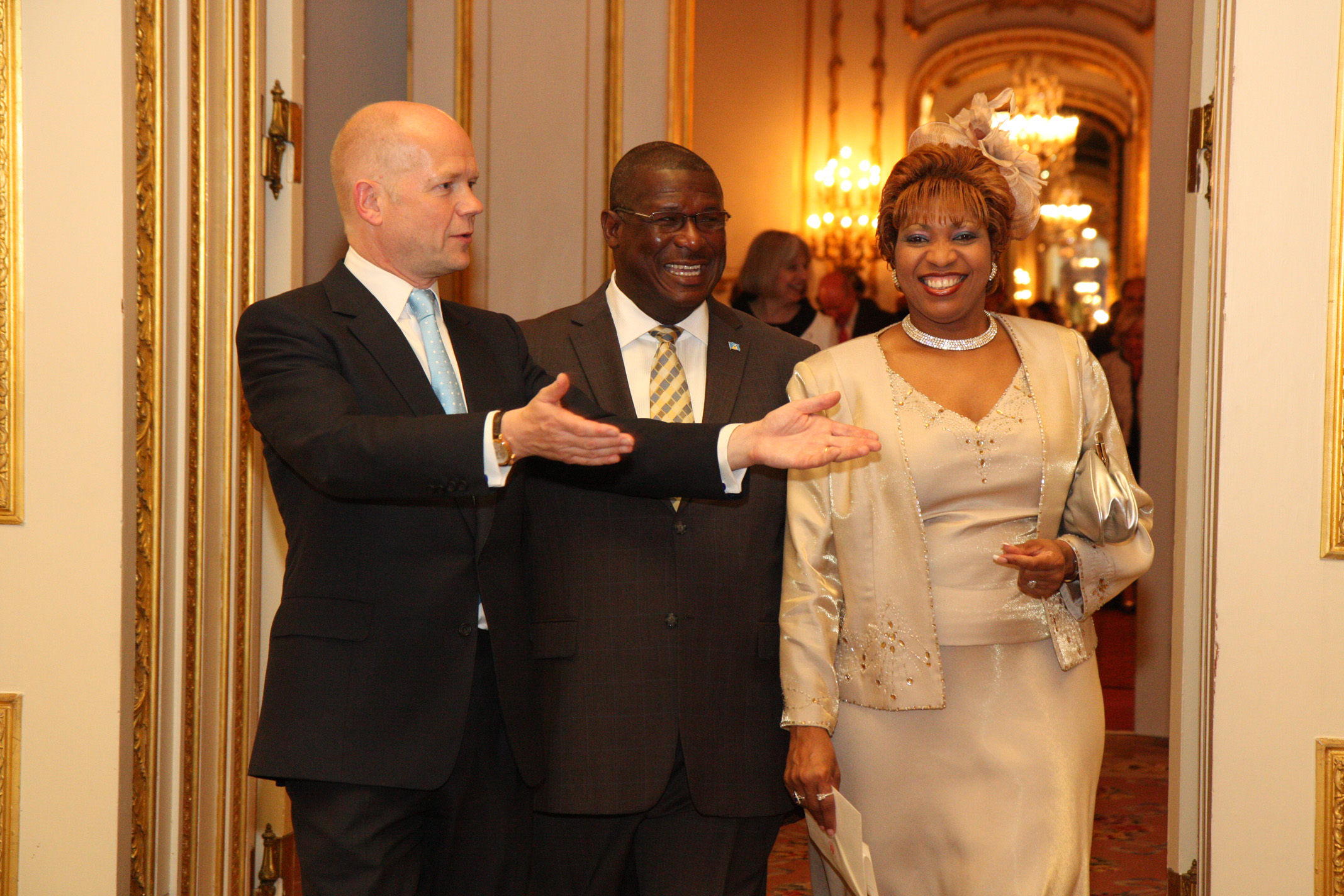
British Foreign Secretary William Hague with Saint Lucian Prime Minister Stephenson King in Lancaster House, April 2011.

Saint Lucia–United Kingdom relations are the foreign and bilateral relations between Saint Lucia and the United Kingdom. The two countries established diplomatic relations in 1979. Both countries are Commonwealth Realms.

Both countries share common membership of the Commonwealth; they are both parties of the CARIFORUM–UK Economic Partnership Agreement. Bilaterally the two countries have an Investment Agreement.

== History ==
The UK governed Saint Lucia from 1803 to 1979, when Saint Lucia achieved full independence.

== Economic relations ==
From 29 December 2008 until 30 December 2020, trade between Saint Lucia and the UK was governed by the CARIFORUM–European Union Economic Partnership Agreement, while the United Kingdom was a member of the European Union.

Following the withdrawal of the United Kingdom from the European Union, the UK and the CARIFORUM states signed the CARIFORUM–United Kingdom Economic Partnership Agreement on 22 March 2019. The CARIFORUM–UK Economic Partnership Agreement is a continuity trade agreement, based on the EU free trade agreement, which entered into force on 1 January 2021. Trade value between CARIFORUM states and the United Kingdom was worth £5,108 million in 2022.

== Diplomatic missions ==
- Saint Lucia maintains a high commission in London.
- The United Kingdom is accredited to its high commission in Castries.

== See also ==
- British West Indies
- Foreign relations of Saint Lucia
- Foreign relations of the United Kingdom
- West Indies Associated States
- West Indies Federation
