= CARIFORUM–United Kingdom Economic Partnership Agreement =

Economic Partnership Agreement between the CARIFORUM States and the United Kingdom of Great Britain and Northern Ireland
- CARIFORUM States United Kingdom
- Type: Free Trade Agreement and Economic Integration Agreement
- Context: Trade continuity agreement between the United Kingdom and CARIFORUM states
- Signed: 22 March 2019
- Location: Castries, Saint Lucia
- Effective: 1 January 2021
- Negotiators: Alexis Downes-Amsterdam; Paul Whittingham
- Original signatories: Barbados; Belize; Dominica; Grenada; Guyana; Jamaica; Saint Kitts and Nevis; Saint Lucia; Saint Vincent and the Grenadines; United Kingdom
- Parties: Antigua and Barbuda; Bahamas; Barbados; Belize; Dominica; Dominican Republic; Grenada; Guyana; Jamaica; Saint Kitts and Nevis; Saint Lucia; Saint Vincent and the Grenadines; Suriname; Trinidad and Tobago; United Kingdom
- Depositary: Foreign, Commonwealth and Development Office
- Languages: English; French; Spanish

The CARIFORUM–United Kingdom Economic Partnership Agreement is a plurilateral free trade agreement between the United Kingdom and Antigua and Barbuda, Bahamas, Barbados, Belize, Dominica, Dominican Republic, Grenada, Guyana, Jamaica, Saint Kitts and Nevis, Saint Lucia, Saint Vincent and the Grenadines, Suriname, Trinidad and Tobago, designed to promote trade, investment, and sustainable development. It largely replicates the existing European Union–CARIFORUM States Economic Partnership Agreement framework, maintaining preferential trade access, with the CARIFORUM. The agreement is part of the UK's strategy to maintain and enhance trade relationships with developing countries following its departure from the European Union.

== Backgrounds ==
From 29 December 2008 until 30 December 2020, trade between the CARIFORUM states and the UK was governed by the CARIFORUM–European Union Economic Partnership Agreement, while the United Kingdom was a member of the European Union.

Following Brexit, the UK sought to replicate and adapt existing EU trade agreements with third countries to ensure continuity in trade. The UK and the CARIFORUM states signed the CARIFORUM–United Kingdom Economic Partnership Agreement on 22 March 2019. The signing ceremony for the CARIFORUM-UK Economic Partnership Agreement took place on 22 March 2019, in Castries, Saint Lucia. At this event, the United Kingdom and nine CARIFORUM countries formally signed the agreement. The ceremony marked a significant step in ensuring continuity of trade relations between the UK and the Caribbean following Brexit and was widely welcomed by businesses and private sector associations in the region.

== Economic impact ==
The CARIFORUM-UK Economic Partnership Agreement (EPA) has significant economic implications for both the UK and CARIFORUM States. By granting immediate duty-free and quota-free access for CARIFORUM exports to the UK, the EPA helps preserve and potentially expand market opportunities for Caribbean producers, supporting export-led growth and regional integration. In return, CARIFORUM States commit to a gradual liberalization of tariffs on UK goods, though sensitive sectors are protected to safeguard local industries and government revenues. The agreement also covers trade in services, intellectual property, and government procurement, providing a comprehensive framework for economic cooperation.

== Members ==
The agreement covers the following countries:

Country	relations overview	Ref.
Antigua and Barbuda	Antigua and Barbuda–United Kingdom relations Foreign relations of Antigua and Barbuda	
Commonwealth of the Bahamas	Bahamas–United Kingdom relations Foreign relations of the Bahamas	
Barbados	Barbados–United Kingdom relations Foreign relations of Barbados	
Belize	Belize–United Kingdom relations Foreign relations of Belize	
Dominica	Dominica–United Kingdom relations Foreign relations of Dominica	
Dominican Republic	Dominican Republic–United Kingdom relations Foreign relations of the Dominican Republic	
Grenada	Grenada–United Kingdom relations Foreign relations of Grenada	
Guyana	Guyana–United Kingdom relations Foreign relations of Guyana	
Haiti	Haiti–United Kingdom relations Foreign relations of Haiti	
Jamaica	Jamaica–United Kingdom relations Foreign relations of Jamaica	
Saint Kitts and Nevis	Saint Kitts and Nevis–United Kingdom relations Foreign relations of Saint Kitts and Nevis	
Saint Lucia	Saint Lucia–United Kingdom relations Foreign relations of Saint Lucia	
Saint Vincent and the Grenadines	Saint Vincent and the Grenadines–United Kingdom relations Foreign relations of Saint Vincent and the Grenadines	
Suriname	Suriname–United Kingdom relations Foreign relations of Suriname	
Trinidad and Tobago	Trinidad and Tobago–United Kingdom relations Foreign relations of Trinidad and Tobago	
United Kingdom	Foreign relations of the United Kingdom	

Suriname signed the agreement on 4 March 2021 and the agreement was provisionally applied to cover the country the following day. Haiti is also eligible to join the CARIFORUM–United Kingdom Economic Partnership Agreement if it signs the agreement and brings it into effect.

== See also ==
- Cuba–United Kingdom relations
- EU–Economic Partnership Agreements
- Free trade agreements of the United Kingdom
- Organisation of African, Caribbean and Pacific States
