= Solomon Islands–United Kingdom relations =

- Solomon Islands: United Kingdom

Diplomatic mission
- None: High Commission of the United Kingdom, Honiara

The Solomon Islands and the United Kingdom established diplomatic relations on 7 July 1978. Both countries are Commonwealth Realms.

Both countries share common membership of the Commonwealth, and the World Trade Organization, as well as the Pacific States–United Kingdom Economic Partnership Agreement. Bilaterally the two countries have a Double Taxation Agreement.

== History ==
The UK governed the Solomon Islands from 1893 until 1978, when the Solomon Islands achieved full independence.

== Economic relations ==
From 17 May 2020 until 30 December 2020, trade between the Solomon Islands and the UK was governed by the Pacific States–European Union Interim Partnership Agreement, while the United Kingdom was a member of the European Union.

Following the withdrawal of the United Kingdom from the European Union, the UK, Fiji, and Papua New Guinea signed the Pacific States–United Kingdom Economic Partnership Agreement on 14 March 2019. The Pacific States–United Kingdom Economic Partnership Agreement is a continuity trade agreement, based on the EU free trade agreement, which entered into force on 1 January 2021. The Solomon Islands joined the trade agreement on 5 January 2021. Trade value between Pacific States and the United Kingdom was worth £286 million in 2022.

== Diplomatic missions ==
- Solomon Islands does not maintain a high commission in the United Kingdom.
- The United Kingdom is accredited to the Solomon Islands through its high commission in Honiara.

== See also ==
- Foreign relations of the Solomon Islands
- Foreign relations of the United Kingdom
