= United Kingdom–Vanuatu relations =

- Vanuatu: United Kingdom

Diplomatic mission
- none: High Commission of the United Kingdom, Port Vila

The United Kingdom–Vanuatu relations encompass the foreign and bilateral relations between the Republic of Vanuatu and the United Kingdom of Great Britain and Northern Ireland. Upon Vanuatu's independence, the two countries established diplomatic relations on 30 July 1980.

Both countries share common membership of the Commonwealth, the United Nations, the World Health Organization, and the World Trade Organization. Bilaterally the two countries have signed an Investment Agreement.

== History ==
The UK governed Vanuatu from 1887 until 1980, when Vanuatu achieved full independence.

== Economic relations ==
Vanuatu is eligible to accede to the Pacific States–United Kingdom Economic Partnership Agreement, a free trade agreement with the United Kingdom.

Following the withdrawal of the United Kingdom from the European Union, the UK and Pacific States signed the Pacific States–United Kingdom Economic Partnership Agreement on 14 March 2019. The Pacific States–United Kingdom Economic Partnership Agreement is a continuity trade agreement, based on the EU free trade agreement, which entered into force on 1 January 2021. Trade value between the Pacific States and the United Kingdom was worth £286 million in 2022.

== Diplomatic missions ==
- Vanuatu does not maintain a high commission in the United Kingdom.
- The United Kingdom is accredited to Vanuatu through its high commission in Port Vila.

== See also ==
- Foreign relations of Vanuatu
- Foreign relations of the United Kingdom
- New Hebrides
