= European Union association agreement =

Treaty between the European Union, its member states, and a non-EU country

A European Union association agreement or simply association agreement (AA) is a treaty between the European Union (EU, or its predecessors), its member states and a non-EU country or bloc of countries that governs bilateral relations. Areas frequently covered by such agreements include the development of political, trade, social, cultural and security links. The provision for an association agreement was included in the Treaty of Rome, which established the European Economic Community, as a means to enable co-operation of the Community with the United Kingdom, which had retreated from the treaty negotiations at the Messina Conference of 1955. According to the European External Action Service, for an agreement to be classified as an AA, it must meet several criteria:

1. The legal basis for [association agreements'] conclusion is Article 217 TFEU (former art. 310 and art. 238 TEC)
2. Intention to establish close economic and political cooperation (more than simple cooperation);
3. Creation of parity bodies for the management of the cooperation, competent to take decisions that bind the contracting parties;
4. Offering most favoured nation treatment;
5. Providing for a privileged relationship between the EC and its partner;
6. Since 1995 the clause on the respect of human rights and democratic principles is systematically included and constitutes an essential element of the agreement;
7. In a large number of cases, the association agreement replaces a cooperation agreement thereby intensifying the relations between the partners.

— European External Action Service

The EU typically concludes Association Agreements in exchange for commitments to political, economic, trade, or human rights reform in a country. In exchange, the country may be offered tariff-free access to some or all EU markets (industrial goods, agricultural products, etc.), and financial or technical assistance. Most recently signed AAs also include a free trade agreement (FTA) between the EU and the external party. Association Agreements have to be accepted by the European Union and need to be ratified by all the EU member states and the state concerned.

== Names and types ==
AAs go by a variety of names (e.g. Euro-Mediterranean Agreement Establishing an Association, Europe Agreement Establishing an Association) and need not necessarily even have the word "Association" in the title. Some AAs contain a promise of future EU membership for the contracting state. The first states to sign such agreements were Greece in 1961 and Turkey in 1963. In recent history, such agreements have been signed as part of two EU policies, the Stabilisation and Association Process (SAp) and the European Neighbourhood Policy (ENP).

The countries of the western Balkans (official candidates Albania, Bosnia and Herzegovina, Montenegro, North Macedonia, Serbia, and potential candidate Kosovo) are covered by SAp. All six have "Stabilisation and Association Agreements" (SAA) with the EU in force. The Eastern European neighbours of Armenia, Azerbaijan, Belarus, Georgia, Moldova, and Ukraine are all members of the Eastern Partnership and are covered by the ENP. While Russia has a special status with the EU-Russia Common Spaces instead of ENP participation. Meanwhile, the countries of the Mediterranean, (Algeria, Morocco, Egypt, Israel, Jordan, Lebanon, Libya, the Palestinian Authority, Syria, Tunisia) are also covered by the ENP and seven of the Mediterranean states have a "Euro-Mediterranean Agreement establishing an Association" (EMAA) with the EU in force, while Palestine has an interim EMAA in force. Syria initialed an EMAA in 2008, however signing has been deferred indefinitely. Negotiations for a Framework Agreement with the remaining state, Libya, have been suspended.

Moldova and Ukraine have Association Agreements in force. Armenia completed negotiations for a AA in 2013 but decided not to sign the agreement and later signed a revised CEPA with the EU in 2017. Azerbaijan was also negotiating an AA, but did not conclude one. Both the SAA and ENP are based mostly on the EU's acquis communautaire and its promulgation in the co-operating states legislation. Of course, the depth of the harmonisation is less than full EU members and some policy areas may not be covered (depending on the particular state). In addition to these two policies, AAs with free-trade agreement provisions have been signed with other states and trade blocs including Chile and South Africa.

== EU Agreements with third states ==
EU Association Agreements with neighbouring countries: EU member states; Agreement on the European Economic Area; Stabilisation and Association Agreement; Agreement Establishing an Association; Partnership and Cooperation Agreement; Association Agreement under negotiations; Association Agreement under negotiations; Euro-Mediterranean Agreement Establishing an Association; Interim Euro-Mediterranean Agreement Establishing an Association; Cooperation Agreement; Euro-Mediterranean Agreement Establishing an Association initialled; Trade and Cooperation Agreement; Partnership and Cooperation Agreement, Comprehensive and Enhanced Partnership Agreement; Partnership and Cooperation Agreement signed; Negotiations on a Framework Agreement suspended

=== Association Agreements ===
==== In force ====
- ACP PA (2003)
- Albania SAA (2009)
- Algeria EMAA (2005)
- Bosnia and Herzegovina SAA (2015)
- Central America AA (2024)
- Chile AA (2005)
- Egypt EMAA (2004)
- Georgia AA (2016)
- Iceland EEA (1994)
- Israel EMAA (2000)
- Jordan EMAA (2002)
- Kosovo* SAA (2016)
- Lebanon EMAA (2006)
- Liechtenstein EEA (1995)
- Moldova AA (2016)
- Montenegro SAA (2010)
- Morocco EMAA (2000)
- North Macedonia SAA (2004)
- Norway EEA (1994)
- Serbia SAA (2013)
- South Africa ATDC (2004)
- Syria CA (1978; cooperation programmes suspended between 2011 and 2026)
- Tunisia EMAA (1998)
- Turkey AA (1964) the framework for a CU (1995)
- Ukraine AA (2017)
- United Kingdom: TCA (2021)

==== Currently in negotiations ====
- Andorra AA
- Libya (negotiations for a Framework Agreement were launched in 2008, but suspended in 2011 due to the Libyan Civil War; as of 2014 the EU is seeking to re-launch the negotiations)
- San Marino AA
- Syria EMAA (initialled in 2008, however signing was frozen by the EU in 2011 due to concerns over the conduct of Syrian authorities during civil war; work resumed on signing the agreement in 2026.)

==== Formerly in negotiations but abandoned ====
- Armenia AA
- Azerbaijan AA
- Monaco AA

==== Defunct agreements ====
- African states Convention of Association (1964, 1971), superseded by another Convention in 1976
- ACP Convention (1976, 1981, 1986, 1991), superseded by PA in 2003
- Algeria CA (1978), superseded by EMAA in 2005
- Bulgaria EAA (1995), acceded to the EU in 2007
- Croatia SAA (2005), acceded to the EU in 2013
- Cyprus AA (1973), acceded to the EU in 2004
- Czech Republic EAA (1995), acceded to the EU in 2004
- Czech and Slovak Federative Republic EAA (NA), did not enter into force due to dissolution of Czechoslovakia
- EAC Agreement Establishing an Association (1971), superseded by another Convention in 1976
- Egypt CA (1978), superseded by EMAA in 2004
- Estonia EAA (1998), acceded to the EU in 2004
- Greece AA (1961), acceded to the EU in 1981
- Hungary EAA (1994), acceded to the EU in 2004
- Jordan CA (1978), superseded by EMAA in 2002
- Latvia EAA (1998), acceded to the EU in 2004
- Lebanon CA (1978), superseded by EMAA in 2006
- Lithuania EAA (1998), acceded to the EU in 2004
- Malta AA (1971), acceded to the EU in 2004
- Morocco CA (1978), superseded by EMAA in 2000
- Poland EAA (1994), acceded to the EU in 2004
- Romania EAA (1995), acceded to the EU in 2007
- Slovakia EAA (1995), acceded to the EU in 2004
- Slovenia EAA (1999), acceded to the EU in 2004
- Tunisia CA (1978), superseded by EMAA in 1998
- United Kingdom ACR (1955), acceded to the EU in 1973

=== Free-trade agreements ===
EU Free trade agreements European Union Agreement in force Agreement (in part) provisionally applied

==== In force ====
- Andorra CU (1991)
- Colombia, Ecuador and Peru FTA (2024)
- Faroe Islands (autonomous constituent country of the Kingdom of Denmark) FTA (1997)
- Japan EPA (2019)
- Mexico EPPCCA (2000)
- Monaco CU (1958)
- New Zealand FTA (2024)
- Palestinian Authority interim EMAA (1997)
- San Marino CCU (2002)
- Singapore FTA (2019)
- South Korea FTA (2015)
- Switzerland FTA (1973)
- Vietnam FTA (2020)

==== Currently undergoing ratification ====
- Canada CETA (signed in 2016)
- Cameroon Interim EPA (signed in 2009)
- CARIFORUM EPA (signed in 2008)
- Côte d'Ivoire Stepping Stone EPA (signed in 2009)
- EAC EPA (signed in 2016)
- Ghana Stepping Stone EPA (signed in 2016)
- Madagascar, Mauritius, the Seychelles, and Zimbabwe Interim EPA (signed in 2009)
- Mercosur PA
- SADC EPA (signed in 2016)

==== Currently in negotiations ====
- Australia FTA
- India FTA
- Malaysia FTA (negotiations paused in 2012)
- Morocco DCFTA (negotiations paused by Morocco in 2014)
- Philippines FTA
- Thailand FTA
- Tunisia DCFTA (negotiations paused in 2019)
- United States TTIP
- ACP Pacific EPA
- ASEAN FTA (negotiations paused in 2009, in favour of bilateral negotiations with individual states)
- ECOWAS EPA (finalised in February 2014, but not signed)
- Central Africa states EPA
- GCC FTA (negotiations suspended by GCC in 2008)

=== Other agreements ===
- Andorra CA (2005)
- Armenia CEPA (2021)
- ACP Pacific Interim PA (2011)
- ASEAN CA (1980), applicable only for the then member states of Indonesia, Malaysia, the Philippines, Singapore and Thailand.
- Azerbaijan PCA (1999)
- GCC CA (1989)
- Indonesia ACPC (2014)
- Iraq PCA (2018)
- Kazakhstan EPCA (2020)
- Kyrgyzstan PCA (1999)
- Mongolia ATEC (1993)
- Mongolia ACPC (2017)
- New Zealand PARC (2022)
- Philippines PCA (2018)
- Russia PCA (1997)
- Tajikistan PCA (2010)
- USSR TCA (1989), endorsed by Tajikistan in 1994 and by Turkmenistan
- Uzbekistan PCA (1999)
- Vietnam ACPC (2016)
- Yemen CA (1998)

==== Currently undergoing ratification ====
- Belarus PCA (signed in 1995)
- Kyrgyzstan EPCA (signed in 2024)
- Singapore PCA (signed in 2018)
- Turkmenistan PCA (signed in 1998)
- Uzbekistan EPCA (signed in 2025)

==== Currently in negotiations ====
- Malaysia PCA
- Russia (negotiations suspended in 2014)
- Thailand PCA

=== Defunct agreements ===
- Albania ATCEC (1992), superseded by SAA in 2009
- Armenia PCA (1999), superseded by CEPA in 2021
- Georgia PCA (1999), superseded by AA in 2016
- Kazakhstan PCA (1999) superseded by EPCA in 2020
- Macedonia CA (1998), superseded by SAA in 2004
- Mexico CA (1991), superseded by EPPCCA in 2000
- Moldova PCA (1998), superseded by AA in 2016
- Serbia FA FRY-EU (2000)
- Ukraine PCA (1998), superseded by AA in 2017
- Vietnam CA (1996) superseded by ACPC in 2016
- North Yemen CA (1985) superseded by CA with the unified Yemen in 1998

Legend

- AA = Agreement Establishing an Association/Association Agreement
- ACPC = Agreement on Comprehensive Partnership and Cooperation
- ACR = Agreement concerning the relations
- ATDC = Agreement on Trade, Development and Cooperation
- CEPA = Comprehensive and Enhanced Partnership Agreement
- CETA = Comprehensive Economic and Trade Agreement
- CA = Cooperation Agreement
- CCU = Agreement on Cooperation and Customs Union
- CU = Customs Union
- DCFTA = Deep and Comprehensive Free Trade Agreement
- EPA = Economic Partnership Agreement
- EPPCCA = Economic Partnership, Political Coordination and Cooperation Agreement
- EAA = Europe Agreement Establishing an Association
- EEA = European Economic Area
- EPCA = Enhanced Partnership and Cooperation Agreement
- EMAA = Euro-Mediterranean Agreement Establishing an Association
- FTA = Free Trade Agreement
- PA = Partnership Agreement
- PCA = Partnership and Cooperation Agreement/Agreement on Partnership and Cooperation
- PARC = Partnership Agreement on Relations and Cooperation
- SAA = Stabilisation and Association Agreement
- ATCEC = Agreement on Trade and Commercial and Economic Cooperation
- ATEC = Agreement on Trade and Economic Cooperation
- TTIP = Transatlantic Trade and Investment Partnership

== Impact on environment and national economies ==
=== Agriculture & Manufacturing ===
Trade agreements between the EU and other countries or free trade zones have differential effects on the respective economies. Agricultural industries are most significantly impacted when regional farms have to compete with large producers that gain access to markets when tariffs fall. For large agreements such as the AA with Mercosur, significant opposition exists in European countries against cheaper imports of meats and other products. However, for the manufacturing sector of cars and industrial products for export, usually involving larger global corporations, relevant volume increases are obvious for the more industrialised trade members.

=== Environment ===
The impact on the environment for those nations that export farm products from areas with rain forests or other ecologically relevant regions, for example in Brazil, has been increasingly documented by environmental groups opposing EU trade agreements. In addition, other industries with large environmental impact such as mining are expanding in areas where the regulatory burden is low, for example in South America and Asia. Industry groups have argued that increased economic performance in those sectors will only strengthen standards in participating nations, and that EU trade agreements should go hand in hand with harmonisation efforts for environmental regulations.

== See also ==
- Eastern Partnership
- Enlargement of the European Union
- EU-ACP Economic Partnership Agreements
- European integration
- European Union free trade agreements
- Free trade areas in Europe
- Potential enlargement of the European Union
- Privileged partnership
- Stability Pact for South Eastern Europe
