= Barbados–United Kingdom relations =

- Barbados: United Kingdom

Barbadian Prime Minister Mia Mottley and British Prime Minister Andy Burnham at a Commonwealth summit in Antigua, November 2026

The historical ties between the governments of Barbados and the United Kingdom of Great Britain and Northern Ireland (UK) are long and complex, including settlement, post-colonialism and modern bilateral relations. The two countries are related through common history spanning 339 years (1627–1966). Since the Bajan date of political independence, these nations continue to share ties through the Commonwealth of Nations. Until becoming a Commonwealth republic in 2021, Barbados also shared the same Head of State, with Queen Elizabeth II as their Monarch.

Barbados was one of the oldest English settlements in the West Indies, being surpassed only by Saint Kitts (though, unlike St. Kitts, Barbados never changed hands. The first English settlement close to Holetown in Barbados was established seventy-four years before the Acts of Union created the Kingdom of Great Britain. In 2016, British Prime Minister Theresa May congratulated Barbados on its 50th anniversary of independence, and expressed desire for continued close "enduring partnership" between the nations.

The British High Commission in Bridgetown was established in 1966. A concurrent Barbadian High Commission is located in London, England.

The two countries are related through common history beginning in the 1620s, the Commonwealth of Nations and until 2021, their sharing of the same Head of State, Queen Elizabeth II as their Monarch. As one of the first English colonies, the initial permanent European settlement took place in the early seventeenth century by English settlers. Barbados thereafter remained as a territory until it negotiated independence in 1966. In recent years, increasing numbers of British nationals have purchased secondary homes in Barbados, and the islands ranked as the Caribbean regions' fourth largest export market of the United Kingdom.

== History ==
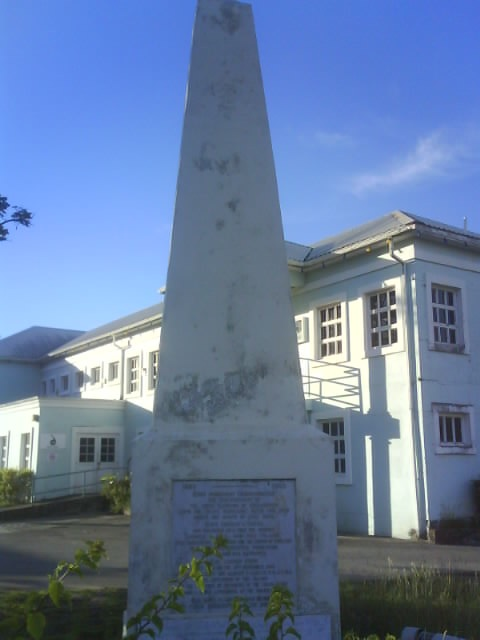
Monument to commemorate initial English claim of Barbados in 1625.

The historic relationship between Barbados and Britain dates back to the 17th century. On a voyage from Brazil, Captain John Powell claimed Barbados in the name of England in 1625. Upon returning to England, his employer Sir William Courteen instructed John Powell to return to Barbados with settlers. John Powell's ship returned to England having not successfully located the island. A second voyage then led by (sibling) Captain Henry Powell in 1627 was successful. A group of 80 English settlers (along with 12 African slaves captured from the Spanish-at sea), established the first permanent European settlement on the island of Barbados on 17 February 1627 at present-day town of Holetown, Saint James. Barbados was transformed into a "proprietary colony" of Courteen's, until a claim on the isle was disputed by James Hay, 1st Earl of Carlisle who had proven that King Charles I of England actually granted him title for the infant colony.

From the first European settlement at St. James Town (which has since been renamed), until Barbadian independence in 1966, the island remained the only Caribbean island which never changed hands among European nations following settlement.

With the early introduction of sugar cane, Barbados became one of the richest of England's colonies in the world. The far eastern location of Barbados made the colony a major commercial centre for Trans-Atlantic trade especially with the British city of Bristol. In the early 1900s Barbados also served as one of the main interconnection points of the British Empire's All Red Line.

== Today ==
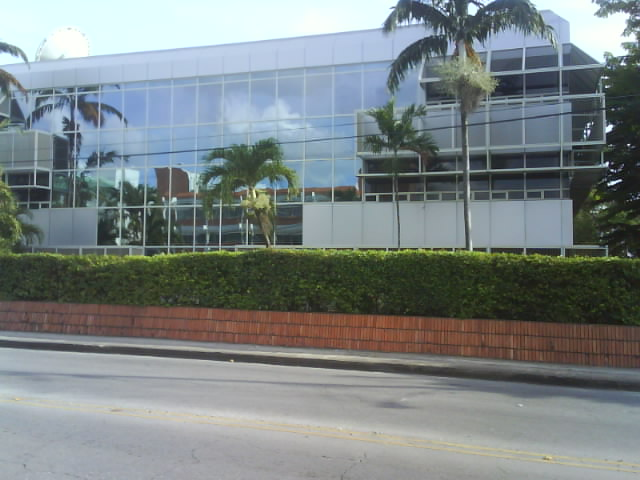
British High Commission (in Bridgetown)

Although Barbados has had strong ties with the UK since the first European settlement, the UK is tied increasingly with the European Union for trade. This has prompted Barbados and other former nations of the British West Indies nations to seek new markets for trade expansion within the Americas. As such the trade, financial, and cultural relations with these separate blocs have become increasingly dominant.

The government of the United Kingdom has consolidated several of its High Commissions with a large number of the Eastern Caribbean offices transferring duties to Bridgetown office.

As Commonwealth realms, the two countries shared a monarch, Queen Elizabeth II, and both are active members of the United Nations, the Commonwealth of Nations, the Commonwealth Parliamentary Association and the African, Caribbean and Pacific–EU's Joint Parliamentary Assembly. Barbados announced it would become a republic by November 2021, to leave its 'colonial past behind'. Critics claim that the move came about in part because China exerted pressure on Barbados.

The Central Bank of Barbados is one of several monetary bodies whose banknotes are printed by De La Rue of England.

In 2011 the British High Commissioner to Bridgetown said that: "the relationship between the UK and Barbados is extremely strong and positive and the ties remain close. It is a good and warm relationship and Barbados remains the destination of choice for the UK."

In 2012 the UK's Minister of State for the Independent Caribbean in the Foreign and Commonwealth Office, Henry Bellingham stated: "Barbados is the island with which the UK has the strongest and most natural relationship; there is a certain level of trust and cooperation between the two countries."

The 2020 plan to replace the Queen as head of state was explained by Prime Minister Mia Mottley: "The time has come to fully leave our colonial past behind. Barbadians want a Barbadian head of state." Her predecessor as PM, Freundel Stuart, had also espoused a similar plan. Whether that goal can be achieved during 2021 was "not clear", according to an investigation of the situation by the Canadian Broadcasting Corporation in March 2021. A BBC News report stated that Guyana, as well as Trinidad and Tobago, already had such a relationship with the UK: a "loose association of former British colonies and current dependencies". In September 2021 Barbados Prime Minister Mia Amor Mottley nominated Sandra Mason as the future country's president. She assumed office on 30 November, the day in which Barbados became a republic. Barbados still remains a member of the Commonwealth of Nations.

== Trade ==
In 2008 British exports to Barbados stood at £38.0 million. This has placed Barbados as Britain's fourth-largest export market in the region.

After years of negotiations the British Broadcasting Corporation re-entered the Barbadian radio market by launching an FM relay station in November 2009. The BBC World Service can now be heard throughout the country on the frequency 92.1 FM.

=== Trade agreements ===
From December 2008 until 30 December 2020, trade between Barbados, and the UK was governed by the CARIFORUM–European Union Economic Partnership Agreement. Following the withdrawal of the United Kingdom from the European Union, the UK and the CARIFORUM states signed a continuity trade agreement based on the EU agreement; this agreement has governed Barbados–UK trade since 1 January 2021.

== Diplomacy ==
In 2011, British Foreign Office Minister, Jeremy Browne visited Barbados to meet with various government ministers and UK businesses from the tourism sector based in Barbados. Following the meeting Mr. Browne stated that the British government understood the Barbados government's concerns about the air passenger duty (APD) and its possible impact on the tourism with Barbados; Browne went on to say the results of the matter would be announced in the annual budget for the United Kingdom on 23 March.

In September 2020, the government of Barbados announced that it intends to become a republic by 30 November 2021, the 55th anniversary of its independence. On 30 November 2021, the day Barbados became a republic, Sandra Mason assumed office as president, replacing the Queen as head of state.

In spite of the constitutional change, during a 2025 King's Birthday event in Barbados The Princess Royal, Princess Anne mentioned her desire for closer ties between the United Kingdom (and by extension the Royal Family) with Barbados.

=== Bilateral agreements ===
Date	Agreement name	Law ref. number
June 2003	Transfer of Offenders Treaty	No 26. (2003)
June 1999	Air Services	No. 23 (2001)
April 1993	Promotion and Protection of Investment — Bilateral Investment Treaty (BIT)	No. 54 (1993)
April 1992	The Social Security (Barbados) Order 1992	No. 812 (1992)

=== Military ===
Historically, the United Kingdom maintained a strong military presence on the island of Barbados. The first imperial troops to land in Barbados were forces of Sir George Ayscue in 1651. From then a militia was established and a number of watchtowers (such as the Gun Hill Signal Station) were strategically placed along the island's high-points to spot and quickly relay any acts of aggression or invasion attempts toward the former colony. Thereafter in 1780, a more permanent command of imperial troops were station in Barbados through to 1906. These troops had been station in the southern parts of the island at the St. Ann's Garrison Savannah in St. Michael, an area which formed one of the oldest Garrisons established in the entire Western Hemisphere. During World Wars I and II many Barbadian service members fought in the British war effort. A long mused point by members of both governments was correspondences sent by Barbados to the Colonial Office in London. In a telegram dated 6 August 1914 Barbadian officials wrote: "Carry on, England. Barbados is behind you." concerning the war with Germany. On 3 September 1939 (the day the UK and France declared war on Nazi Germany), the first telegram to arrive in Whitehall came from Barbados and contained simply, "Barbados is with you."

Barbados and the United Kingdom continue their long history of co-operation on security matters. This role has evolved toward dealing with: fighting drugs, crime and money laundering. The Barbados Defence Force and The Royal Marines still maintain an alliance between their military units. The British government bases the regional British Military Advisory and Training Team (BMATT) in the nations of Barbados and Antigua & Barbuda.

== Migration ==
=== To Barbados ===
In recent years a growing number of British nationals have been relocating to Barbados to live. A poll conducted by the British Broadcasting Corporation (BBC) found that there were roughly 27,000 persons identified as British citizens living abroad in Barbados. The ranking placed Barbados as third in the Americas in terms of British nationals resident, (behind the United States and Canada). Other polls have shown that British nationals make 75–85 percent of the Barbados second home market.

=== To the United Kingdom ===
The 2001 UK Census showed over 21,000 Barbadian born people residing in the UK (the largest Barbadian born diaspora on earth). Barbadians constitute the second largest Afro-Caribbean group in the UK.

== Twin or sister cities / towns ==
- 1982 – Bridgetown, St. Michael – Borough of Hackney, London, England
- 2003 – Speightstown, St. Peter – Reading, Berkshire, England
- 2009 – Holetown, St. James – Borough of Haringey, London, England

== See also ==
- List of high commissioners of the United Kingdom to Barbados and the Eastern Caribbean
- Anglicisation
- Commonwealth Caribbean
- Commonwealth free trade
- Economic Partnership Agreements
- Barbadian British
