= Antigua and Barbuda–United Kingdom relations =

- Antigua and Barbuda: United Kingdom

British Prime Minister Andy Burnham with Antiguan Prime Minister Gaston Browne at a Commonwealth summit in Antigua, November 2026

Antigua and Barbuda and the United Kingdom of Great Britain and Northern Ireland (UK) are related through a long common history spanning from 1632 for Antigua, and 1678 for the smaller sister-isle of Barbuda through until 1981 for the joint-state. Antigua was one of the oldest English settlements in the West Indies, and served as a British hub of regional administration for the surrounding Leeward Islands.

Following the collapse of the British West Indies Federation in 1962 due-to internal power struggles, in 1967 Antigua and Barbuda attained self-governance was reorganized into a free association with the United Kingdom and known as the UK-West Indies Associated States (UK-WIAS) union. Since the Antiguan and Barbudan date of independence in 1981, these nations continue to share ties through the Commonwealth of Nations, and as two of fifteen separate nations across the globe closely co-existing through sharing of the same Head of State, King Charles III as their Monarch.

== Economic relations ==
From December 2008 until 30 December 2020, trade between Antigua and Barbuda, and the UK was governed by the CARIFORUM–European Union Economic Partnership Agreement. Following the withdrawal of the United Kingdom from the European Union, the UK and the CARIFORUM states signed a continuity trade agreement based on the EU agreement; this agreement has governed Antigua and Barbuda–UK trade since 1 January 2021.

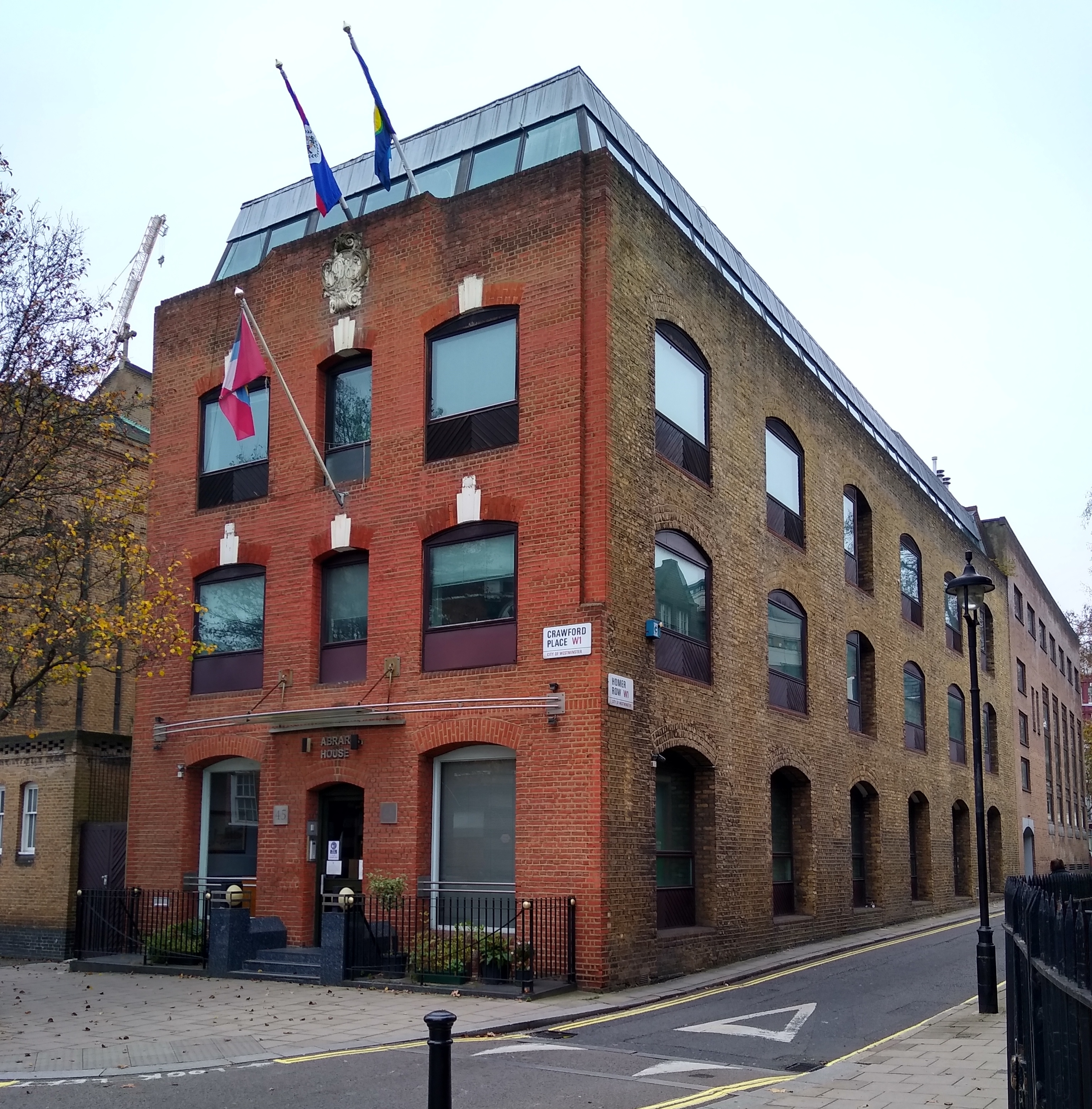
High Commission of Antigua and Barbuda in London

== Resident diplomatic missions ==
- Antigua and Barbuda has a High Commission in London.
- United Kingdom has a High Commission in St. John's.

== See also ==
- List of high commissioners of the United Kingdom to the Eastern Caribbean, (at Barbados)
- Anglicisation
- Commonwealth Caribbean
- Commonwealth free trade
- Economic Partnership Agreements
- English Harbour
- Antiguans and Barbudans in the United Kingdom
