= Saint Vincent and the Grenadines–United Kingdom relations =

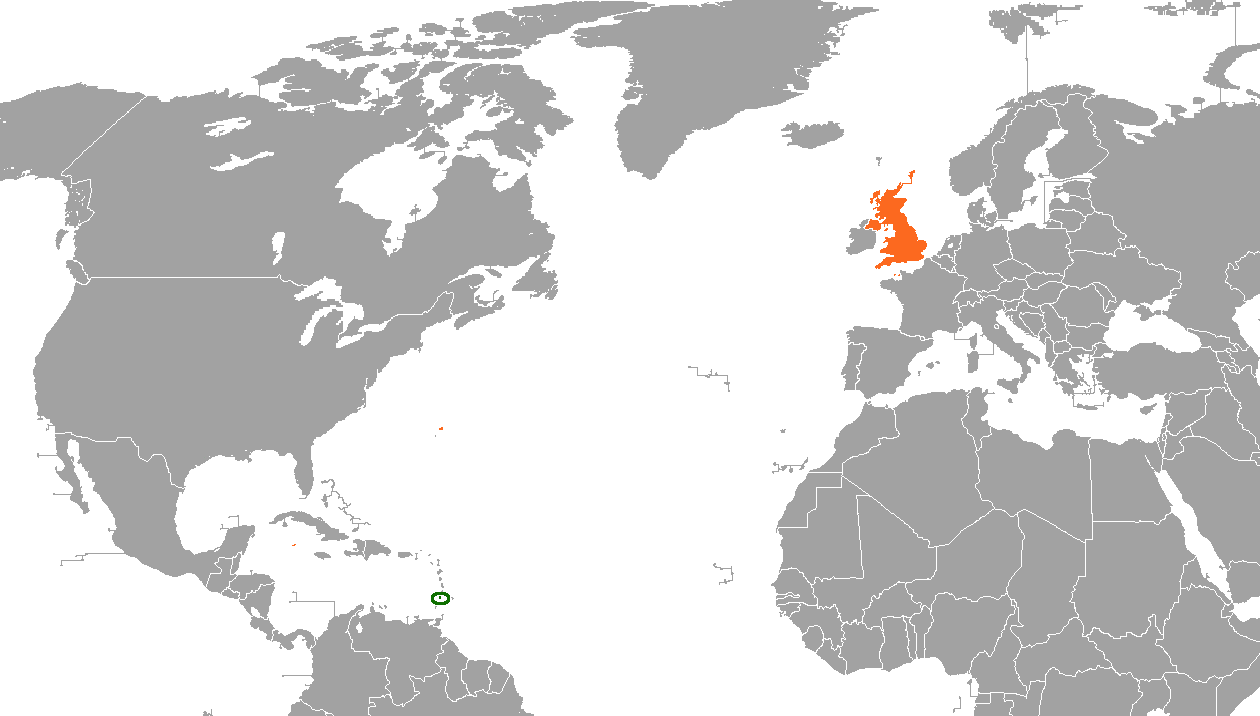

- Saint Vincent and the Grenadines: United Kingdom

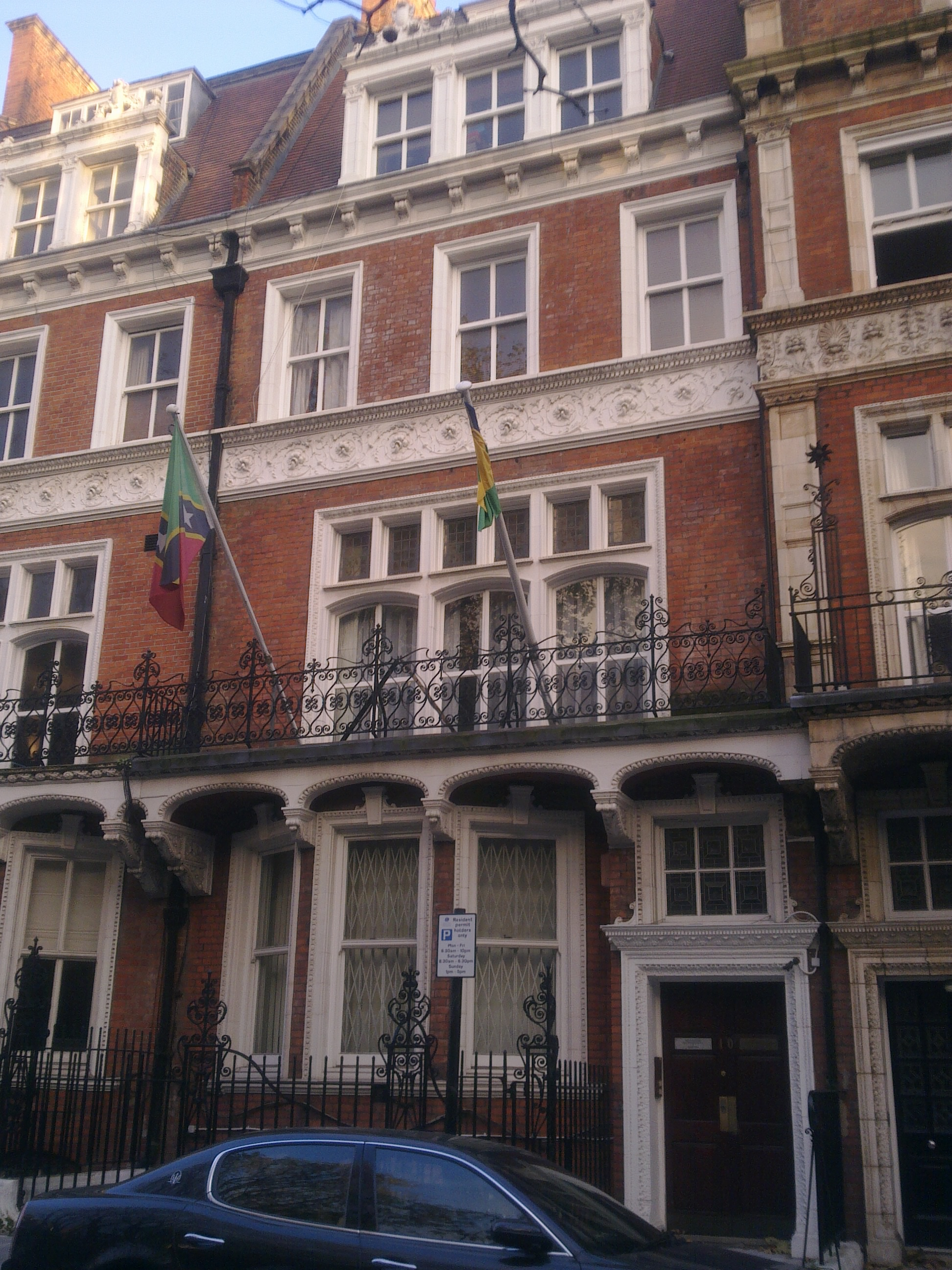
The High Commission of Saint Vincent and the Grenadines, London

Saint Vincent and the Grenadines and the United Kingdom have a long history, tracing back to early British settlements and British conflicts with the French during the Colonial era.

== History ==
Control of the island of Saint Vincent was ceded to Britain by the French following the signing of the Treaty of Paris in 1763. The French recaptured the island but ceded it again after the second Treaty of Paris in 1783.

The British began a program of agricultural development and established plantations across the island; a program opposed by local Black Caribs.

Saint Vincent remained under British colonial rule. After independence movements began in the 20th century, Saint Vincent (with the neighboring smaller islands) was granted "associate statehood" status by Britain on 27 October 1969. This gave Saint Vincent complete control over its internal affairs but was short of full independence. On 27 October 1979, following a referendum under Milton Cato, Saint Vincent and the Grenadines became the last of the Windward Islands associated states to gain independence. Independence came on the 10th anniversary of Saint Vincent's associate statehood status.

== Current relations ==
Saint Vincent and the Grenadines maintains a High Commission in South Kensington in London and a consulate-general in Comber, Northern Ireland. In turn, the United Kingdom maintains a High Commission in Kingstown.

== Economic relations ==
From December 2008 until 30 December 2020, trade between Saint Vincent and the UK was governed by the CARIFORUM–European Union Economic Partnership Agreement. Following the withdrawal of the United Kingdom from the European Union, the UK and the CARIFORUM states signed a continuity trade agreement based on the EU agreement; this agreement has governed Saint Vincent and the Grenadines–UK trade since 1 January 2021.
