= Andorra—San Marino—European Union Association Agreement =

Agreement establishing an association between the European Union and its Member States, of the one part, and the Principality of Andorra and the Republic of San Marino, each as a separate Party, of the other part
- EU countries (yellow) as well as Andorra and San Marino (blue markers)
- Type: Association agreement
- Signed: 19 October 2026
- Location: Brussels
- Condition: Ratification by all signatories
- Signatories: EU; all 27 EU member states; Andorra; San Marino
- Parties: None
- Depositary: Secretary-general of the Council of the European Union
- Languages: Catalan All 24 official EU languages: Bulgarian; Croatian; Czech; Danish; Dutch; English; Estonian; Finnish; French; German; Greek; Hungarian; Irish; Italian; Latvian; Lithuanian; Maltese; Polish; Portuguese; Romanian; Slovak; Slovene; Spanish; Swedish

The Andorra—San Marino—European Union Association Agreement, formally the Agreement establishing an association between the European Union and its Member States, of the one part, and the Principality of Andorra and the Republic of San Marino, each as a separate Party, of the other part is an association agreement of the European Union (and its 27 member states) with Andorra and San Marino.

The agreement is the most comprehensive the EU has ever negotiated as

- it includes extension of the European single market to Andorra and San Marino and thus the application of the four freedoms: free movement of goods as well as capital, freedom to establish and provide services and free movement of labour. Due to their small size, some derogations apply however.
- Changes in applicable EU law are directly applicable also in San Marino and Andorra
- The European Commission needs to approve possible cases of state aid
- The Court of Justice of the European Union decides on cases of non-compliance, and courts of Andorra/San Marino can (and sometimes must) ask preliminary questions regarding the interpretation of EU law.

Negotiations started in 2013, originally also with Monaco. Negotiations with Monaco were ended in 2023 after concerns about regulations on financial services. Negotiations with Andorra and San Marino were concluded in 2024. The agreement is signed in October 2026 after which it is planned to be provisionally applied.

== Background ==
In November 2012, after the Council of the European Union had called for an evaluation of the EU's relations with the sovereign European microstates of Andorra, Monaco and San Marino, which they described as "fragmented", the European Commission published a report outlining options for their further integration into the EU. Unlike Liechtenstein, which is a member of the European Economic Area (EEA) via the European Free Trade Association (EFTA) and the Schengen Agreement, relations with these three states are based on a collection of agreements covering specific issues. The report examined four alternatives to the current situation:

1. a Sectoral Approach with separate agreements with each state covering an entire policy area (found needlessly complicated)
2. a comprehensive, multilateral Framework Association Agreement (FAA) with the three states (seen as a viable option)
3. EEA membership (seen as a viable option)
4. EU membership (dismissed as "the EU institutions are currently not adapted to the accession of such small-sized countries.")

In response, the Council requested that negotiations with the three microstates on further integration continue, and that a report be prepared by the end of 2013 detailing the implications of the two viable alternatives and recommendations on how to proceed.

=== EEA membership option ===
As EEA membership is currently only open to EFTA or EU members, the consent of existing EFTA member states is required for the microstates to join the EEA without becoming members of the EU. In 2011, Jonas Gahr Støre, the then Foreign Minister of Norway which is an EFTA member state, said that EFTA/EEA membership for the microstates was not the appropriate mechanism for their integration into the internal market due to their different requirements from large countries such as Norway, and suggested that a simplified association would be better suited for them. Espen Barth Eide, Støre's successor, responded to the Commission's report in late 2012 by questioning whether the microstates have sufficient administrative capabilities to meet the obligations of EEA membership. However, he stated that Norway was open to the possibility of EFTA membership for the microstates if they decide to submit an application, and that the country had not made a final decision on the matter. Pascal Schafhauser, the Counsellor of the Liechtenstein Mission to the EU, said that Liechtenstein, another EFTA member state, was willing to discuss EEA membership for the microstates provided their joining did not impede the functioning of the organization. However, he suggested that the option direct membership in the EEA for the microstates, outside of both the EFTA and the EU, should be given consideration.

On 18 November 2013 the EU Commission published their report which concluded that "the participation of the small-sized countries in the EEA is not judged to be a viable option at present due to the political and institutional reasons", but that Association Agreements were a more feasible mechanism to integrate the microstates into the internal market, preferably via a single multilateral agreement with all three states (Andorra, Monaco & San Marino). In December 2014 the Council of the European Union approved negotiations being launched on such an agreement, and they began in March 2015.

=== Negotiations ===
In December 2023, the European Commission announced the conclusion of negotiations on a new Association Agreement between the EU and Andorra and San Marino; negotiations with Monaco had been suspended in September 2023 due to disputes over financial regulation. The Commission formally put forward a proposal to the Council of the European Union in April 2024 to adopt decisions approving that the agreement be signed and concluded. In December 2025 the Council of the European Union determined that the agreement consisted of mixed competencies, and so would require approval in each EU member state's respective parliaments. In July 2026, following Bulgaria’s withdrawal of its veto, the Council of the EU authorized the signing of the association agreements with Andorra and San Marino, which organises their participation in the single market (including the financial sector if some conditions are fullfilled).

== Approval ==
The agreement needs to be signed by all parties (the EU, its 27 member states, Andorra and San Marino), after which it needs to be ratified by them before it formally enters into force. Signature of the 27 member states takes place in October 2026, after which the European Union will sign. As entry into force will take several years, the agreement provides for the option to provisionally apply parts of it before formal entry into force.

=== Implementation in Andorra ===
Andorra will hold a referendum to approve or reject the agreement. The referendum will be advisory only, despite statements in the electoral program of Andorra's leading party, Demòcrates per Andorra (DA), that a binding referendum would be sought.

According to a public opinion poll in the second half of 2025, 35.2% viewed the agreement positively while 34% had a negative view.

== See also ==
- Free trade agreements of Andorra
- Free trade agreements of San Marino
- Free trade agreements of the European Union
- Foreign relations of Andorra
- Foreign relations of San Marino
- Foreign relations of the European Union
- List of bilateral free trade agreements
