= Betty Palaso =

Papua New Guinean diplomat

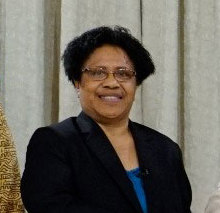
- Palaso in 2019
- Born: Manus Province, Papua New Guinea (PNG)
- Occupations: Civil servant and diplomat
- Known for: PNG's Ambassador to the Philippines

Betty Palaso is a Papua New Guinean diplomat and civil servant. She is the Ambassador of Papua New Guinea (PNG) to the Philippines. Prior to that appointment, she headed PNG's Internal Revenue Commission.

== Early life ==
Betty Palaso was born in the Manus Province of Papua New Guinea. Her father was a missionary and she travelled with him to several locations in the country, living in rural areas. She obtained an undergraduate degree in economics from the University of Papua New Guinea in Port Moresby.

== Career ==
After graduation, Palaso joined the Department of the Treasury and Finance as a graduate economist. In a 2016 interview she recalled her trepidation at being required, as a very junior officer, to negotiate with delegations from organizations such as the International Monetary Fund and the World Bank, and how the responsibility at a young age had a positive effect on her. She was subsequently promoted to assistant secretary within the department.

Palaso joined the Internal Revenue Commission in 1999. She was appointed Commissioner-General of the Commission in November 2007. When she left the post in 2018, a lounge for taxpayers in the commission's building was named after her. During part of her time with the commission, she was also one of the eight members of the Board of the Bank of Papua New Guinea. In September 2018 she was appointed as PNG's Ambassador to the Philippines, presenting her credentials to President Rodrigo Duterte in March of the following year.

== Awards and honours ==
- Palaso was made an Officer of the Order of the British Empire in 2003.
- In the 2017 Birthday Honours she was made a Companion of the Order of Saint Michael and Saint George.
