= Pacific States–United Kingdom Economic Partnership Agreement =

Interim Economic Partnership Agreement between the United Kingdom of Great Britain and Northern Ireland and the Pacific States
- Pacific States United Kingdom
- Type: Free Trade Agreement
- Context: Trade continuity agreement between the United Kingdom and Pacific states
- Signed: 14 March 2019
- Location: London, United Kingdom
- Effective: 1 January 2021
- Condition: The agreement entered into force provisionally once the United Kingdom and at least one Pacific State completed their applicable domestic procedures and notified each other.
- Negotiators: Jitoko Tikolevu; Winnie Kiap; Liam Fox
- Original signatories: Fiji; Papua New Guinea; United Kingdom
- Parties: Fiji; Papua New Guinea; Samoa; Solomon Islands; United Kingdom
- Languages: English; French

The Pacific States–United Kingdom Economic Partnership Agreement is a plurilateral free trade agreement between the United Kingdom and Fiji, Papua New Guinea, Samoa, and the Solomon Islands, designed to promote trade, investment, and sustainable development. It largely replicates the existing European Union–Pacific States Economic Partnership Agreement framework, maintaining preferential trade access, with Fiji and Papua New Guinea and later Samoa and Solomon Islands. The agreement is part of the UK's strategy to maintain and enhance trade relationships with developing countries following its departure from the European Union.

== Backgrounds ==
Following Brexit, the UK sought to replicate and adapt existing EU trade agreements with third countries to ensure continuity in trade. The UK-Pacific EPA is based on the EU-Pacific States Economic Partnership Agreement, reflecting similar provisions and objectives. The agreement was signed on 14 March 2019 and entered into force in 2021, with Samoa and the Solomon Islands acceding on 31 March 2022.

== Members ==
The agreement covers the following countries:

- Fiji
- Papua New Guinea
- Samoa (Note: Joined 11 January 2021)
- Solomon Islands (Note: Joined 5 January 2021)
- United Kingdom

The Pacific States–UK Economic Partnership Agreement states that 10 other Pacific nations are currently eligible to apply for accession, Tonga has shown interest in acceding to the EPA:

- Cook Islands
- Federated States of Micronesia
- Kiribati
- Marshall Islands
- Nauru
- Niue
- Palau
- Tonga
- Tuvalu
- Vanuatu

== Economic impact ==
The agreement ensures that trade between the UK and Pacific States continues on preferential terms, avoiding a reversion to less favourable Most Favoured Nation (MFN) tariff rates. This continuity is estimated to prevent an annual increase of around £19 million in duties on imports from the Pacific region.

== See also ==
- Economic Partnership Agreements
- Free trade agreements of the United Kingdom
- Foreign relations of Fiji
- Foreign relations of Papua New Guinea
- Foreign relations of Samoa
- Foreign relations of the Solomon Islands
- Foreign relations of the United Kingdom
- Fiji–United Kingdom relations
- Papua New Guinea–United Kingdom relations
- Solomon Islands–United Kingdom relations
