= Free trade agreements of the European Union =

Overview of free trade agreements in the European Union

EU Free trade agreements European Union Agreement in force Agreement provisionally applied

The European Union has concluded free trade agreements (FTAs). The European Union negotiates free trade deals on behalf of all of its member states, as the member states have granted the EU an "exclusive competence" to conclude trade agreements. Even so, member states' governments control every step of the process (via the Council of the European Union, whose members are national ministers from each national government):

- Before negotiations start, member states' governments (via the Council of Ministers) approve the negotiating mandate;
- During negotiations, member states' governments are regularly briefed on the progress of negotiations and can update the negotiations mandate or suspend negotiations;
- Upon conclusion of negotiations, member states' governments decide whether the agreement should be signed;
- After approval from the European Parliament and (in case the agreement covers areas other than trade such as investment protection) upon ratification in each member state parliament, member states' governments decide whether the agreement should be concluded and enter into effect.

The list below only includes countries that have an FTA with the European Union according to the WTO.

== Free trade agreements in force ==
State	No of jurisdictions represented (Note: Excluding the EU and its member states)	Signed	Provisional application	In force since	Notes	Relations
Albania	1	2006	2006 (Note: Entry into force of Interim Agreement)	2009	SAA	Negotiating for EU accession
Algeria	1	2002		2005	Euro-mediterranean AA	Algeria–EU relations
Andean Community; Colombia; Ecuador; Peru	3	2012	2013, 2017	2024	FTA	
Andorra	1	1990		1991	Customs union	Andorra–EU relations
Bosnia and Herzegovina	1	2008	2008	2015	SAA	Candidate for EU accession
Central America; Costa Rica; Guatemala; Honduras; Nicaragua; Panama; El Salvador	6	2012	2013	2024	AA	Central America–European Union Association Agreement
Chile	1	2002, 2023	2003, 2024	2005 2025	AA, Interim & Updated EU-Chile AA	
Egypt	1	2001		2004	Euro-mediterranean AA	Egypt–EU relations
Faroe Islands	1	1996		1997	Autonomous entity of Denmark	Faroe Islands-EU relations
Georgia	1	2014	2014	2016	AA incl DCFTA	Georgia–EU relations and Candidate for EU accession
Iceland	1	1992		1994	EEA	Iceland–EU relations
Israel	1	1995	1996	2000	Euro-Mediterranean AA	Israel–EU relations
Japan	1	2018		2019	Economic Partnership Agreement	Japan-EU relations
Jordan	1	1997		2002	Euro-Mediterranean AA	Jordan–EU relations
Kenya	1	2023		2024	Economic Partnership Agreement	
Kosovo	1	2015		2016	SAA	Potential candidate for EU accession
Lebanon	1	2002		2006	Euro-Mediterranean AA	Lebanon–EU relations
Liechtenstein	1	1992		1995	EEA	Liechtenstein–EU relations
Mexico	1	1997		2000	FTA	Mexico–EU relations
Moldova	1	2014	2014	2016	Moldova–European Union Association Agreement incl European Union–Moldova Deep and Comprehensive Free Trade Area	Moldova–EU relations and Negotiating for EU accession
Montenegro	1	2007	2008	2010	SAA	Negotiating for EU accession
Morocco	1	1996		2000	Euro-Mediterranean AA	Morocco–EU relations
New Zealand	1	2023		2024	FTA	New Zealand–EU relations
North Macedonia	1	2001	2001	2004	SAA	Negotiating for EU accession
Norway	1	1992		1994	EEA	Norway–EU relations
EU's Overseas Countries and Territories	13	2001		2001	Association of the OCTs with the EU	
Palestinian Authority	1	1997		1997	Euro-Mediterranean AA	Palestine–EU relations
San Marino	1	1991	1992 (Note: Interim Agreement)	2002	Customs union	San Marino–EU relations
Serbia	1	2008	2010	2013	SAA	Negotiating for EU accession
Singapore	1	2018		2019	FTA	Singapore–EU relations
South Africa	1	1999	2000	2004	ATDC (Note: Agreement on Trade, Development and Cooperation)	South Africa–EU relations
South Korea	1	2010	2011	2015	FTA	South Korea–EU relations
Switzerland	1	1972		1973	Trade agreement	Switzerland–EU relations
Syria	1	1977		1977 (Note: Partially suspended between 2011 and 2026 in response to serious human rights violations by the regime of Bashar al-Assad in the Syrian Civil War)	Cooperation agreement	Syria–EU relations
Tunisia	1	1995		1998	Euro-Mediterranean AA	Tunisia–EU relations
Turkey	1	1995 (Note: Decision of the EC-Turkey Association Council)		1995	Customs union	Turkey–EU relations
Ukraine	1	2014	2016	2017	Ukraine–European Union Association Agreement incl DCFTA	Ukraine–EU relations and Negotiating for EU accession
United Kingdom (Note: Includes Jersey, Guernsey and the Isle of Man with regards to trade in goods and fisheries. For Northern Ireland, a more comprehensive arrangement is in place with regards to trade in goods based on the Withdrawal Agreement.)	1	2020	2021	2021	Trade and Cooperation Agreement	United Kingdom–EU relations
Vietnam	1	2019		2020	EVFTA	Vietnam–EU relations

== Free trade agreements provisionally applied ==
State	Signed	Provisional Application	Ratification	Notes	Relations
Cameroon	2009	2014	22 / 30	Interim agreement with a view to an EPA	
Canada	2016	2017	19 / 30	Comprehensive Economic and Trade Agreement	Canada-EU relations
CARIFORUM States; Antigua and Barbuda; Bahamas; Barbados; Belize; Dominica; Dominican Republic; Grenada; Guyana; Haiti; Jamaica; Saint Kitts and Nevis; Saint Lucia; Saint Vincent and the Grenadines; Suriname; Trinidad and Tobago	2008	2008	37 / 44	EPA - Croatia acceded to the agreement on 28 November 2017	
Côte d'Ivoire	2009	2016	25 / 30	Stepping Stone EPA	
Eastern and Southern Africa States; Comoros; Madagascar; Mauritius; Seychelles; Zimbabwe	2009	2012, 2019	6 / 35	Interim Agreement for establishing a framework for an EPA	
Ghana	2016	2016	14 / 30	Stepping Stone EPA	
Mercosur; Argentina; Brazil; Paraguay; Uruguay	2026	2026	5 / 6	European Union–Mercosur free trade agreement	European Union–Mercosur relations
Pacific States; Fiji; Papua New Guinea; Samoa; Solomon Islands	2009	2009, 2014, 2018, 2020	4 / 5	Interim Partnership Agreement	
South African Development Community (SADC) members Botswana; Lesotho; Mozambique; Namibia; South Africa; Eswatini	2016	2016	22 / 35	Economic Partnership Agreement	

== Negotiated free trade agreements ==
Ongoing negotiations as of January 2026:

- India–EU Free Trade Agreement
- Indonesia–EU Comprehensive Economic Partnership Agreement
- EU-Australia Free Trade Agreement
- EU-United Arab Emirates Free Trade Agreement
- EU-Philippines Free Trade Agreement
- EU-Malaysia Free Trade Agreement
- EU-Thailand Free Trade Agreement

== Competence ==
The European Court of Justice has held that investor-state arbitration provisions (including a dedicated tribunal planned by some free trade agreements) falls under competency shared between European Union and its member states and that for this reason, the ratification of such mixed agreements should be approved by the EU as well as by each of the union's member states. This court decision has resulted in a new architecture of external trade negotiations which will have two components:

- a free trade agreement - related exclusively to trade matters - which can be adopted at the EU level;
- an investment agreement - containing investment, arbitration and other non-trade provisions - which needs to be ratified by the member states as well.

== Impact to consumers ==
One study found that the trade agreements that the EU implemented over the period 1993-2013 have, on average, increased the quality of imported goods by 7% and therefore "lowered quality-adjusted prices by close to 7%," without having much of an impact on the non-adjusted price.

== See also ==
- EU-ACP
- EUR.1 movement certificate
- Economic Partnership Agreements
- Euro-Mediterranean free trade area
- European Union Association Agreement
- Everything but Arms
- Free trade agreements of the United Kingdom
- Free trade area
- Free trade areas in Europe
- List of bilateral free trade agreements
- List of free trade agreements
- List of the largest trading partners of the European Union
- Trade deal negotiation between the UK and EU (2020)
- Trade defence instrument
- United States free trade agreements
