= United Kingdom membership of the European Union =

The United Kingdom (along with the British Overseas Territory of Gibraltar) was a member state of the European Union (EU) and of its predecessor the European Communities (EC) – principally the European Economic Community (EEC) – from 1 January 1973 until 31 January 2020. Since the foundation of the EEC, the UK had been an important neighbour and then a leading member state, until Brexit ended 47 years of membership. During the UK's time as a member state two referendums were held on the issue of its membership: the first, held on 5 June 1975, resulting in a vote to stay in the EC, and the second, held on 23 June 2016, resulting in a vote to leave the EU.

== History ==
=== EU roots and British accession (1957–1973) ===
Ten West European nations (not including West Germany) created the Council of Europe in 1949, the first step towards political co-operation between them, but some countries wanted to go further. The 1951 Treaty of Paris created the European Coal and Steel Community (ECSC), which began to unite European countries economically and politically in order to secure lasting peace, after two world wars had started in Europe in the first half of the century. The six founding countries were Belgium, France, West Germany, Italy, Luxembourg and the Netherlands. The 1950s were dominated by the Cold War between the Soviet bloc and the Western democracies. In 1951, the six ECSC countries signed a treaty to run their heavy industries – coal and steel – under a common management. It was felt that, with this arrangement, no country on its own could make weapons of war that it could turn against the others, in contrast to what had occurred in the past. In 1957, building on the success of the Coal and Steel Treaty, the six ECSC countries expanded co-operation to other economic sectors by signing the Treaty of Rome, creating the European Economic Community (EEC), or 'Common Market'. The idea was for people, goods and services to be able to move freely across borders. The French president Charles de Gaulle was determined to have his own 'special relationship' with West Germany, for he wished the EEC to be essentially a Franco-German alliance, with the other four members being satellite states.

The UK was not a signatory of the three original treaties that were incorporated into what was then the European Communities, including the best-known of these, the Treaty of Rome. Britain first began talks to join the EEC in July 1961. The UK's applications to join in 1963 and 1967 were vetoed by the President of France, Charles de Gaulle. While it was true that Britain's economy, like many others, was struggling to recover from the high cost of the Second World War, De Gaulle had personal as well as economic reasons for not wanting the British around the table. He distrusted the British particularly because he thought that in disputes they would always take the American side. There were also distinct differences between the French and British farming industries. De Gaulle in his memoirs described the problem of the agriculture sector for French governments: "How could we maintain on our territory more than two million farms, three-quarters of which were too small and too poor to be profitable, but on which, nonetheless, nearly one-fifth of the French population live?" His solution was the Common Agricultural Policy (CAP). It provided for a single market for agricultural goods at guaranteed prices, a Community preference scheme against imports, and financial solidarity. Intervention in markets to buy up surplus stocks at minimum prices, subsidising sales on world markets, and imposing levies on the import of cheaper goods from outside the Community – these were the techniques adopted, the bill for them being paid by taxpayers and consumers.

Britain, as a result of emergency wartime measures, had one of the most efficient farming industries in the world, and while agriculture accounted for 25% of the French economy, it only accounted for 4% in the UK. In the 1950s Britain's cheap food policy was predicated on trading at world market prices, which were throughout this period substantially lower than the CAP ones. It was supplemented for its farmers from the 1950s by a system of deficiency payments.

De Gaulle, aware that the CAP was crucial to France's economic security and social stability at that time, knew the British would not accept it, and his veto made sure that they could not stop CAP happening. Despite its complexity, the CAP's origin and driving momentum lay in a simple but historic trade-off between France's agricultural interests and Germany's industrial interests. Germany as a manufacturing economy wanted tariff-free access for its industrial goods throughout the EEC, so France got the CAP, and in return Germany got the Customs union and the Common external tariff built into the Treaty of Rome.

The system of price support developed through the 1970s and 1980s: the CAP absorbed more and more Community resources, from an estimated 12.9 per cent of the budget in 1966 to 68.4 or even 80 per cent in 1985. Between 1974 and 1983, guarantee expenditure on agricultural products grew from three billion ECUs to 16 billion ECUs. These trends emerged precisely as the importance of agriculture and rural populations in the member-states proportionately declined. Distribution of the benefits was also highly skewed; the Commission estimates that in 1991 some 80 per cent of support went to 20 per cent of the EU's farmers.

De Gaulle said that "a number of aspects of Britain's economy, from working practices to agriculture" had "made Britain incompatible with Europe" and that Britain harboured a "deep-seated hostility" to any pan-European project.

Once de Gaulle had relinquished the French presidency in 1969, the UK made a third and successful application for membership (the CAP, and the Customs Union and Tariff system, being by now well established). Attitudes to Britain joining the EEC had shifted in political and business circles in both the UK and France, for by the late 1960s exports from Britain to western Europe outstripped those to countries participating in Imperial Preference, and British investment in the EEC was greater than that going to the Commonwealth. Large firms in advanced manufacturing became increasingly vocal advocates of joining the EEC, and the Confederation of British Industry, whose predecessor the Federation of British Industries had originally opposed the establishment of a European customs union after the Second World War, stressed the importance of pan-European investment, collaboration and co-ordinated industrial policy. In France, government and business opinion were increasingly aware that American firms were dominating high-tech sectors and were better at organising integrated production networks in Europe than local companies, in part due to the fragmentation of European businesses, as argued by Jean-Jacques Servan-Schreiber in his 1967 book Le défi américain ("The American Challenge"). In response, the country's main employers' organisation, the Conseil national du patronat français, lobbied along with senior French civil servants to reverse de Gaulle's policy regarding British membership.

One complication with the negotiation came about because, in 1969 European Communities had asked their Foreign Affairs committee to 'study the best way of achieving progress in the matter of unification'. When the foundations of common foreign policy in the European Community was drafted in 1970, it was explicitly extended to include accession countries, to ensure the UK were involved in the development before the accession.

The Treaty of Accession was signed in January 1972 by the then prime minister Edward Heath, leader of the Conservative Party. Parliament's European Communities Act 1972 was enacted on 17 October, and the UK's instrument of ratification was deposited the next day (18 October), letting the United Kingdom's membership of the EEC come into effect on 1 January 1973.

Despite having to wait until 1 January 1973 to become a member of the European Communities, the UK was allowed to take a full part in the political development in the days immediately after signing the treaty.

There were potential economic benefits for Britain joining the EEC in regards to earnings, with Britain having fallen behind member states of the EEC in this category following its establishment in 1958. That year, Britons earned on average 50% more than those in Italy and as much as workers in the Netherlands, West Germany, and France. In 1969, however, average earnings in Italy had caught up with Britain while in the other Common Market countries average earnings were between 25% and 50% higher than in Britain.

=== Referendum of 1975 ===
In 1975, the United Kingdom held its first ever national referendum on whether the UK should remain in the European Economic Community. The governing Labour Party, led by Harold Wilson, had contested the October 1974 general election with a commitment to renegotiate Britain's terms of membership of the EEC and then hold a referendum on whether to remain in the EEC on the new terms. All of the major political parties and the mainstream press supported continuing membership of the EEC. However, there were significant divides within the ruling Labour Party; a 1975 one-day party conference voted by two to one in favour of withdrawal, and seven of the 23 cabinet ministers were opposed to EEC membership, with Harold Wilson suspending the constitutional convention of Cabinet collective responsibility to allow those ministers to publicly campaign against the government.

On 5 June 1975, the electorate was asked to vote yes or no on the question: "Do you think the UK should stay in the European Community (Common Market)?" Every administrative county and region in the UK returned majority "Yes" votes, apart from the Shetland Islands and the Outer Hebrides. With a turnout of just under 65%, the outcome of the vote was 67.2% in favour of staying in, and the United Kingdom remained a member of the EEC. Support for the UK to leave the EEC in 1975, in the data, appears unrelated to the support for Leave in the 2016 referendum.

1975 United Kingdom European Communities membership referendum
| Choice | Votes | % |
|---|---|---|
| Yes | 17,378,581 | 67.23 |
| No | 8,470,073 | 32.77 |
| Valid votes | 25,848,654 | 99.78 |
| Invalid or blank votes | 54,540 | 0.22 |
| Total votes | 25,903,194 | 100.00 |
| Registered voters/turnout | 40,086,677 | 64.62 |
Source: House of Commons Library

NOTE: Unusually for a referendum Yes was the no change (status quo) option.

National referendum results (excluding invalid votes)
| Yes; 17,378,581 (67.2%) | No; 8,470,073 (32.8%) |
▲50%

=== From Referendum to Maastricht Treaty (1975–1992) ===
Comparison of results of 1975 and 2016 referendums

In 1979, the United Kingdom opted out of the newly formed European Monetary System (EMS), which was the precursor to the creation of the euro currency.

The opposition Labour Party campaigned in the 1983 general election on a commitment to withdraw from the EEC without a referendum. It was heavily defeated; the Conservative government of Margaret Thatcher was re-elected. The Labour Party subsequently changed its policy.

In 1985, the United Kingdom ratified the Single European Act – the first major revision to the Treaty of Rome – without a referendum, with the full support of the Thatcher government.

In October 1990 – under the conservative governance of Margaret Thatcher – the United Kingdom joined the European Exchange Rate Mechanism (ERM), with the pound sterling pegged to a basket of eight other European currencies.

=== Maastricht Treaty and Referendum Party ===
Thatcher resigned as Prime Minister in November 1990, amid internal divisions within the Conservative Party that arose partly from her increasingly Eurosceptic views. The United Kingdom was forced to withdraw from the ERM in September 1992, after the pound sterling came under pressure from currency speculators (an episode known as Black Wednesday). The resulting cost to UK taxpayers was estimated to be in excess of £3 billion.

On 1 November 1993, the Maastricht Treaty started the implementation of the Economic and Monetary Union of the European Union and formalized European citizenship; it also changed the name of the Community to the European Union reflecting the evolution of the organization from an economic union into a political union, which started long before (TREVI, European Political Co-operation).: the Union is founded on the European Communities (first pillar), with two additional areas of cooperation (second and third pillars): the Common Foreign and Security Policy (CSFP) and Justice and Home Affairs (JHA). As a result of the Lisbon Treaty, which entered into force on 1 December 2009, the Maastricht Treaty is now known, in updated form as, the Treaty on European Union (2007) or TEU, and the Treaty of Rome is now known, in updated form, as the Treaty on the Functioning of the European Union (2007) or TFEU.

The Referendum Party was formed in 1994 by Sir James Goldsmith to contest the 1997 general election on a platform of providing a referendum on the UK's membership of the EU. It fielded candidates in 547 constituencies at that election, and won 810,860 votes or 2.6% of the total votes cast. It failed to win a single parliamentary seat because its vote was spread out across the country, and lost its deposit (funded by Goldsmith) in 505 constituencies.

=== Costs and benefits of membership ===
The UK made significant contributions to the EU budget.

While a member, there were a number of economic benefits to the UK, particularly arising from being part of the European single market.

Britain was one of the largest recipients of research funding from the EU. From 2007 to 2013, the UK received €8.8 billion out of a total of €107 billion expenditure on research, development and innovation in EU Member States, associated and third countries. At the time, this represented the fourth largest share in the EU. The European Research Council granted 79 projects funding in the UK in 2017, more than any other EU country.

Some studies found significant net benefits, amounting to 6 times the cost of membership. Others found that they are finely balanced. Studies that found net costs of membership, i.e., net benefits of leaving the EU were found to depend on the assumptions used.

=== Role of UKIP (1993–2016) ===
The UK Independence Party (UKIP), a Eurosceptic political party, was also formed, in 1993. It achieved third place in the UK during the 2004 European elections, second place in the 2009 European elections and first place in the 2014 European elections, with 27.5% of the total vote. This was the first time since the 1910 general election that any party other than the Labour or Conservative parties had taken the largest share of the vote in a nationwide election. UKIP's electoral success in the 2014 European election has been documented as the strongest correlate of the support for the leave campaign in the 2016 referendum.

In 2014, UKIP won two by-elections, triggered by defecting Conservative MPs, and in the 2015 general election took 12.6% of the total vote and held one of the two seats won in 2014.

=== Controversy on the European Court of Human Rights in 2013 ===
The European Convention on Human Rights (ECHR) was drafted in 1950 and its court (ECtHR) was established in 1953. EU institutions are bound under article 6 of the Treaty on European Union to respect human rights under the convention, over and above for example the Law of the United Kingdom. The Court was criticised especially within the Conservative Party for ruling in favour of British prisoners obtaining the right to vote. During the referendum the then Home Secretary, Theresa May, had called for the UK to leave the ECHR.

Neither the ECHR nor the ECtHR is formally part of the European Union, and are not connected to the Court of Justice of the European Union (CJEU). The ECHR was drafted by, and the ECtHR is part of, the Council of Europe, of which the UK was a founding member in 1949. The UK was an independent signatory to the ECHR, 21 years before joining the EC/EU, in 1951. However, the European Court of Human Rights (which is the court founded by the European Convention of Human Rights) does not have constitutional supremacy over the various judiciaries of European Countries. The European Court of Justice (which is the court founded by the Treaty on the Functioning of the European Union) does in fact try to follow the European Convention of Human Rights and the judgements/opinions of the European Court of Human Rights.

=== Euroscepticism (1993–2016) ===
In a statistical analysis published in April 2016, Professor John Curtice of Strathclyde University defined Euroscepticism as the wish to sever or reduce the powers of the EU, and conversely Europhilia as the desire to preserve or increase the powers of the EU. According to this definition, the British Social Attitudes (BSA) surveys show an increase in euroscepticism from 38% (1993) to 65% (2015). Euroscepticism should however not be confused with the wish to leave the EU: the BSA survey for the period July–November 2015 shows that 60% backed the option "continue as an EU member", and only 30% backed the option to "withdraw".

Since 1977, both pro- and anti-European views have had majority support at different times, with some dramatic swings between the two camps. In the United Kingdom European Community membership referendum of 1975, two-thirds of British voters favoured continued EEC membership. The highest-ever rejection of membership was in 1980, the first full year of Prime Minister Margaret Thatcher's term of office, with 65% opposed to and 26% in favour of membership.

After Thatcher had negotiated the UK rebate of British membership payments in 1984, those favouring the EC and later the EU maintained a lead in the opinion polls, except during 2000 – at which time Prime Minister Tony Blair was aiming for closer EU integration, including adoption of the euro currency – and around 2011, as immigration into the United Kingdom became increasingly noticeable. As late as December 2015 there was, according to ComRes, a clear majority in favour of remaining in the EU, albeit with a warning that voter intentions would be considerably influenced by the outcome of Prime Minister David Cameron's ongoing EU reform negotiations, especially with regards to the two issues of "safeguards for non-Eurozone member states" and "immigration". The following events are relevant.

=== 2016 EU membership referendum ===
On 23 June 2016 the United Kingdom held its second referendum on membership of what had now become the European Union. This took place forty-one years after the first referendum, which had resulted in an overwhelming vote to remain within the bloc. The second referendum came about after the Conservatives led by David Cameron won an unexpected small overall majority in the 2015 UK general election, which included a manifesto commitment to holding a in-out referendum on Britain's relationship with the EU following a renegotiation which took place in the autumn and winter of 2015–16. At the same time parliament legislated for the referendum by passing the European Union Referendum Act 2015. The UK Government was in favour of a "Remain" result, although cabinet ministers were allowed to campaign on either side in a suspension of Cabinet collective responsibility, just as ministers had back in 1975. The surprise result of the referendum after a long ten-week campaign, with a narrow majority of people (52% for, 48% against) in favour of leaving the EU on a national turnout of 72%, sent shockwaves both throughout Europe and the rest of the world, causing turmoil in money markets and stock markets during the following day. David Cameron announced that he would resign as Prime Minister, and he was succeeded by Theresa May who became Prime Minister on 13 July 2016 to begin the process of the UK's withdrawal from the bloc.

2016 United Kingdom European Union membership referendum
| Choice | Votes | % |
|---|---|---|
| Leave the European Union | 17,410,742 | 51.89 |
| Remain a member of the European Union | 16,141,241 | 48.11 |
| Valid votes | 33,551,983 | 99.92 |
| Invalid or blank votes | 25,359 | 0.08 |
| Total votes | 33,577,342 | 100.00 |
| Registered voters/turnout | 46,500,001 | 72.21 |
Source: Electoral Commission

National referendum results (excluding invalid votes)
| Leave; 17,410,742 (51.9%) | Remain; 16,141,241 (48.1%) |
▲50%

Results by UK voting region (left) and by council district/unitary authority (GB) & UK Parliament constituency (NI) (right)
Leave
Remain

Referendum results by United Kingdom regions
| Region | Electorate | Voter turnout, of eligible | Votes | | Proportion of votes | | Invalid votes |
| Region | Electorate | Voter turnout, of eligible | Remain | Leave | Remain | Leave | Invalid votes |
|---|---|---|---|---|---|---|---|
| East Midlands | 3,384,299 | 74.2% | 1,033,036 | 1,475,479 | 41.18% | 58.82% | 1,981 |
| East of England | 4,398,796 | 75.7% | 1,448,616 | 1,880,367 | 43.52% | 56.48% | 2,329 |
| Greater London | 5,424,768 | 69.7% | 2,263,519 | 1,513,232 | 59.93% | 40.07% | 4,453 |
| North East England | 1,934,341 | 69.3% | 562,595 | 778,103 | 41.96% | 58.04% | 689 |
| North West England | 5,241,568 | 70.0% | 1,699,020 | 1,966,925 | 46.35% | 53.65% | 2,682 |
| Northern Ireland | 1,260,955 | 62.7% | 440,707 | 349,442 | 55.78% | 44.22% | 374 |
| Scotland | 3,987,112 | 67.2% | 1,661,191 | 1,018,322 | 62.00% | 38.00% | 1,666 |
| South East England | 6,465,404 | 76.8% | 2,391,718 | 2,567,965 | 48.22% | 51.78% | 3,427 |
| South West England (inc Gibraltar) | 4,138,134 | 76.7% | 1,503,019 | 1,669,711 | 47.37% | 52.63% | 2,179 |
| Wales | 2,270,272 | 71.7% | 772,347 | 854,572 | 47.47% | 52.53% | 1,135 |
| West Midlands | 4,116,572 | 72.0% | 1,207,175 | 1,755,687 | 40.74% | 59.26% | 2,507 |
| Yorkshire and the Humber | 3,877,780 | 70.7% | 1,158,298 | 1,580,937 | 42.29% | 57.71% | 1,937 |
Overall Total
| United Kingdom | 46,500,001 | 72.2% | 16,141,241 | 17,410,742 | 48.11% | 51.89% | 25,359 |

Referendum results by United Kingdom constituent countries & Gibraltar
| Country | Electorate | Voter turnout, of eligible | Votes | | Proportion of votes | | Invalid votes |
| Country | Electorate | Voter turnout, of eligible | Remain | Leave | Remain | Leave | Invalid votes |
|---|---|---|---|---|---|---|---|
| England | 38,981,662 | 73.0% | 13,247,674 | 15,187,583 | 46.59% | 53.41% | 22,157 |
| Gibraltar | 24,119 | 83.7% | 19,322 | 823 | 95.91% | 4.08% | 27 |
| Northern Ireland | 1,260,955 | 62.7% | 440,707 | 349,442 | 55.78% | 44.22% | 384 |
| Scotland | 3,987,112 | 67.2% | 1,661,191 | 1,018,322 | 62.00% | 38.00% | 1,666 |
| Wales | 2,270,272 | 71.7% | 772,347 | 854,572 | 47.47% | 52.53% | 1,135 |
Overall Total
| United Kingdom | 46,500,001 | 72.2% | 16,141,241 | 17,410,742 | 48.11% | 51.89% | 25,359 |

=== Brexit (2017–2020) ===
Following the referendum, the UK was engaged from 2017 to 2019 in negotiations with the European Union to leave the EU. Between the UK and EU, the so-called "Brexit" – a portmanteau of "Britain" and "exit" – would consist of a withdrawal agreement and a trade agreement; however, at a global level this might also split various other trade agreements. The withdrawal agreement was viewed by the EU as a "settlement of accounts" unrelated to the post-exit trade agreement, and viewed by the UK as a 'goodwill payment' to enable a fair post-exit trade agreement. In the event of a no-deal scenario, each side will consequently have different views as to the validity of any payment.

On 29 March 2017, the then British Prime Minister Theresa May formally triggered Article 50 of the Lisbon Treaty by sending a letter to the then President of the European Council Donald Tusk, which gave the UK and EU two years, until 29 March 2019 at 11 pm (UK time), to agree an exit deal. If the two parties were unable to strike an agreement, and if the Article 50 period had not been extended, the UK would leave the EU without a deal as the default position.

Come March 2019, the UK was unable to reach a deal and so, to avoid a no-deal scenario, agreed a deal with the EU to delay the exit under Article 50 until 12 April – two weeks after the original deadline. This deadline was not reached, and the two parties then postponed the so-called "Brexit Day" until 31 October 2019. This required Britain to participate in the 2019 European Parliament election. The newly established Eurosceptic Brexit Party, headed by Nigel Farage, made sweeping gains, taking a high percentage of the UK vote.

In July 2019, Theresa May resigned as Prime Minister. On 23 July 2019, Vote Leave campaigner Boris Johnson took office as her replacement. Johnson extended the deadline until 31 January 2020, and then called an early general election in December. Johnson and the Conservative Party won a majority of 80 seats. Both the EU and UK Parliaments ratified the Withdrawal Agreement, which allowed the UK to leave the bloc at 11 pm GMT on 31 January 2020. Negotiations on the future UK–EU relationship subsequently began once the UK formally left the EU and entered the transition period.

== See also ==
- United Kingdom opt-outs from EU legislation
- United Kingdom–European Union relations
- Opinion polling on the United Kingdom rejoining the European Union (2020–present)
- Opinion polling on the United Kingdom's membership of the European Union (2016–2020)
- Post-Brexit United Kingdom relations with the European Union
