= Economic Partnership Agreements =

Economic agreements between the EU and other countries

Economic Partnership Agreements (EPAs) are a scheme to create a free trade area (FTA) between the European Union and other countries. They are a response to continuing criticism that the non-reciprocal and discriminating preferential trade agreements offered by the EU are incompatible with WTO rules. The EPAs date back to the signing of the Cotonou Agreement. The EPAs with the different regions are at different states of play. The EU has signed EPAs with the following countries: the Southern African Development Community (SADC), ECOWAS (16 states), six countries in Eastern and Southern Africa, Cameroon, four Pacific states, and the CARIFORUM states. Their defining characteristic is that they open up exports to the EU immediately, while exports to the partner regions is opened up only partially and over transitioning periods.

Following the withdrawal of the United Kingdom from the European Union, the United Kingdom duplicated eight EPAs, such as with Cameroon, Ghana, the Caribbean, and the pacific states.

There is also an Japan–EU EPA, which is however symmetrical in opening markets, and thus only an EPA in name. Similarly the Japan–UK EPA is only an EPA in name for the same reason.

== Key elements ==
=== Reciprocity ===
Due to the continuing WTO incompatibility of previous arrangements, the EPAs' key feature is their reciprocity and their non-discriminatory nature. They involve the phased out removal of all trade preferences which have been established between the EU and the ACP countries since 1975 as well as the progressive removal of trade barriers between the partners. In order to fulfil the criterion of being a non-discriminatory agreement, the EPAs are open to all developing countries, thereby effectively terminating the ACP group as the main development partner of the EU.

The establishment of a reciprocal trade agreement confronts the EU with the problem of how to reconcile the special status of the ACP group with the EU's obligations to the WTO. The solution proposed for this dilemma is an agreement which is only as reciprocal as necessary to fulfil WTO criteria. In reality, the ACP countries will have some room to manoeuvre and to maintain some limited protection of their most vital products. The extent to which trade must be liberalised under the new EPAs is still a widely debated issue and it remains to be seen whether the WTO provisions regulating regional trade agreements will be revised in favour of the EPA scheme at the end of the Doha Round.

=== Regionalism ===
True to the Cotonou principle of differentiation and regionalisation the developing countries are encouraged to enter into the EPAs in regional groupings. So far the ACP countries have formed seven regional groupings in which they intend to enter into EPAs with the European Union. These regional groupings are

- the Economic Community of West African States
- the Economic and Monetary Community of Central Africa
- the Southern African Development Community
- the East African Community
- the Eastern and Southern Africa (ESA)
- the Caribbean Community + Dominican Republic (CARIFORUM)
- the Pacific region.

=== Special treatment ===
The new regional grouping established due to the EPA scheme causes the problem of how to reconcile this approach with the previous special treatment of the group of least developed countries (LDCs) among the ACP countries. Currently, 40 of the 79 ACP countries are defined as LDCs by the United Nations. The LDCs constitute a special group among the developing countries and have usually been treated separately.

Therefore, the EPAs will provide special arrangements for this particular group. As opposed to the other ACP countries, the group of LDCs will be invited to reject the EPAs and continue trade relations under the "Everything But Arms" (EBA) regulation. Launched in 2001 by the Council of Ministers, this amendment to the EC's Generalized System of Preferences has since then regulated the trade relations between the EU and the LDCs that have chosen to use this facility, granting duty-free access to all products from LDCs without any quantitative restrictions – except to arms and munitions. While this provision facilitates the situation of the LDCs under the new trade scheme, it has also been criticised because the EBA initiative prevents LDCs from opening up their markets for EU products within the context of an EPA. Another weakness of the EBA initiative is that it utilises the rules of origin of the GSP which require double stage transformation for textiles and clothing. The rules of origin of the EPAs on the other hand allows single stage transformation for the exports of these sectors. This is one of the reasons why Mozambique and Lesotho (both LDCs) initialled the SADC EU Interim EPA in November 2007, and then went on to sign this agreement in July 2009. Angola (the other LDC in the SADC EPA configuration) has chosen to continue trading under EBA as their main exports to the EU are oil and diamonds which as 'wholly obtained' originating products enjoy duty and quota free entry under the EBA rules of origin.

== Predicted impact ==
Researchers at the Overseas Development Institute predict the impact of the EPAs, however, to be rather minimal. Because most African, Caribbean and Pacific (ACP) group states already enjoyed duty and tariff free access of about €1.4 billion from the Cotonou Agreement that expired in 2007, there was little new that could be offered. The expected impact described by the ODI:

- The transfer of the import tax levied by the EU (€12.7 million in 2006) to parts of the ACP export supply chain, making exports more profitable.
- Accrued revenue transfer could induce ACP members to increase levels of trade between each other and increase their supply of competitive products without substantial new investment.
- Removing tariff barriers may make it economically feasible to export additional products to the EU that are already exported to other markets.
- The most significant, but not necessarily most likely effect, is that there could be increases in foreign exchange earning and positive effects for the rest of the economy.

== United Kingdom ==
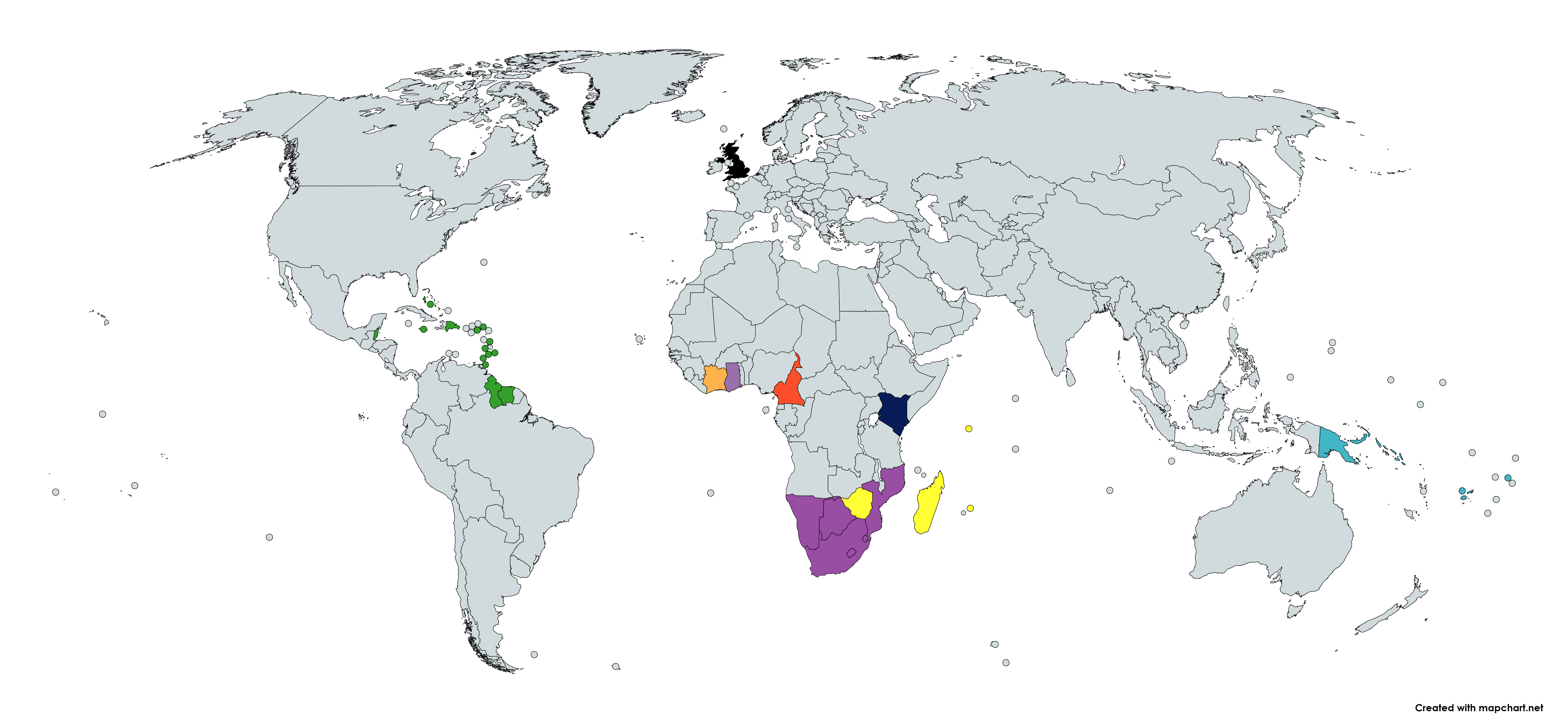
United Kingdom Cameroon EPA CARIFORUM EPA Eastern and Southern Africa EPA Ghana EPA Ivory Coast EPA Kenya EPA Pacific States EPA Southern Africa Customs Union and Mozambique EPA

Following the Brexit referendum, the United Kingdom replicated the eight European Union Economic Partnership Agreements that were entered into force prior to the UK's withdrawal from the EU on 1 January 2021. These "continuity trade agreements" duplicate the majority of its clauses and text from the European agreements. The following agreements, with countries and regions, were entered into force following Brexit:

- Cameroon–UK Economic Partnership Agreement
- CARIFORUM–United Kingdom Economic Partnership Agreement
- Eastern and Southern Africa–UK Economic Partnership Agreement
- Ghana–UK Interim Trade Partnership Agreement
- Ivory Coast–UK Stepping Stone Economic Partnership Agreement
- Kenya–UK Economic Partnership Agreement
- Pacific States–United Kingdom Economic Partnership Agreement
- Southern Africa Customs Union and Mozambique–United Kingdom Economic Partnership Agreement

=== Cameroon ===
The Cameroon EPA is a continuity trade agreement based on the EU's EPA with the Economic Community of Central African States, with Cameroon being the only ECCAS member to ratify the EPA. The trade deal was signed on 28 December 2020, while the agreement entered into force on 1 January 2021.

=== CARIFORUM ===
The CARIFORUM EPA is a continuity trade agreement based on the EU's EPA with the Caribbean Forum states; these include Antigua and Barbuda, The Bahamas, Barbados, Belize, Dominica, the Dominican Republic, Grenada, Guyana, Jamaica, Saint Kitts and Nevis, Saint Lucia, Saint Vincent and the Grenadines, and Trinidad and Tobago. The trade deal was signed on 22 March 2019, while the agreement entered into force on 1 January 2021. Suriname signed and acceded to the EPA on 5 March 2021. Haiti is eligible to join the EPA if it signs the agreement and bring it into effect.

=== Eastern and Southern Africa ===
The Eastern and Southern Africa EPA is a continuity trade agreement based on the EU's EPA with the COMESA states; these include Mauritius, Seychelles, and Zimbabwe. The trade deal was signed on 31 January 2019, while the agreement entered into force on 1 January 2021. Madagascar signed the EPA on 4 November 2021 and joined the agreement on 1 August 2024. Comoros signed the EPA on 12 April 2022, both countries will be covered by the agreement when they bring it into effect. Zambia will be covered by the EPA if they sign it and bring it into effect.

=== Ghana ===
The Ghana EPA is a continuity trade agreement based on the EU's EPA with the Economic Community of West African States, with Ghana being one of only two ECOWAS member to ratify the EPA. The trade deal was signed on 2 March 2021, while the agreement entered into force on 5 March 2021.

=== Ivory Coast ===
The Ivory Coast EPA is a continuity trade agreement based on the EU's EPA with the Economic Community of West African States, with Ivory Coast being the other ECOWAS member to ratify the EPA. The trade deal was signed on 15 October 2020, while the agreement entered into force on 1 January 2021.

=== Kenya ===
The Kenya EPA is a continuity trade agreement based on the EU's EPA with the East African Community, with Kenya being the only EAC member to ratify the EPA. The trade deal was signed on 8 December 2020, while the agreement entered into force on 1 January 2021. All the other East African Community members are eligible to apply for accession to the EPA; these members include Burundi, DR Congo, Rwanda, Somalia, South Sudan, Tanzania, and Uganda.

=== Pacific States ===
The Pacific States EPA is a continuity trade agreement based on the EU's EPA with the Pacific Islands Forum states; these initially included Fiji, and Papua New Guinea. The trade deal was signed on 14 March 2019, while the agreement entered into force on 1 January 2021. The Solomon Islands joined the EPA on the 5 January 2021. Samoa joined the EPA on the 11 January 2021. The Cook Islands, Kiribati, the Marshall Islands, the Federated States of Micronesia, Nauru, Niue, Palau, Tonga, Tuvalu, and Vanuatu are eligible to join the EPA if they sign it and bring it into effect; Tonga has shown interest in acceding to the EPA.

=== Southern Africa Customs Union and Mozambique ===
The Southern Africa Customs Union and Mozambique EPA is a continuity trade agreement based on the EU's EPA with the Southern African Customs Union states; these include Botswana, Eswatini, Lesotho, Namibia, and South Africa, while the UK EPA also incorporated Mozambique which had joined the customs union since the EU–SACUM EPA was signed. The trade deal was signed on 9 October 2019, aside from South Africa which signed on the 16 October 2019, while the agreement entered into force on 1 January 2021.

== See also ==
- Free trade agreements of the European Union
- Free trade agreements of the United Kingdom
- Free trade area
- List of bilateral free trade agreements
- List of multilateral free trade agreements
- ACP-EU Development Cooperation
- Cotonou Agreement
- Lomé Convention
- ACP-EU Joint Parliamentary Assembly
- The Courier (ACP-EU) - The magazine of Africa-Caribbean-Pacific and European Union cooperation and relations
- Common Agricultural Policy - agricultural policy of the European Union
