= British High Commission =

British diplomatic mission to a Commonwealth country

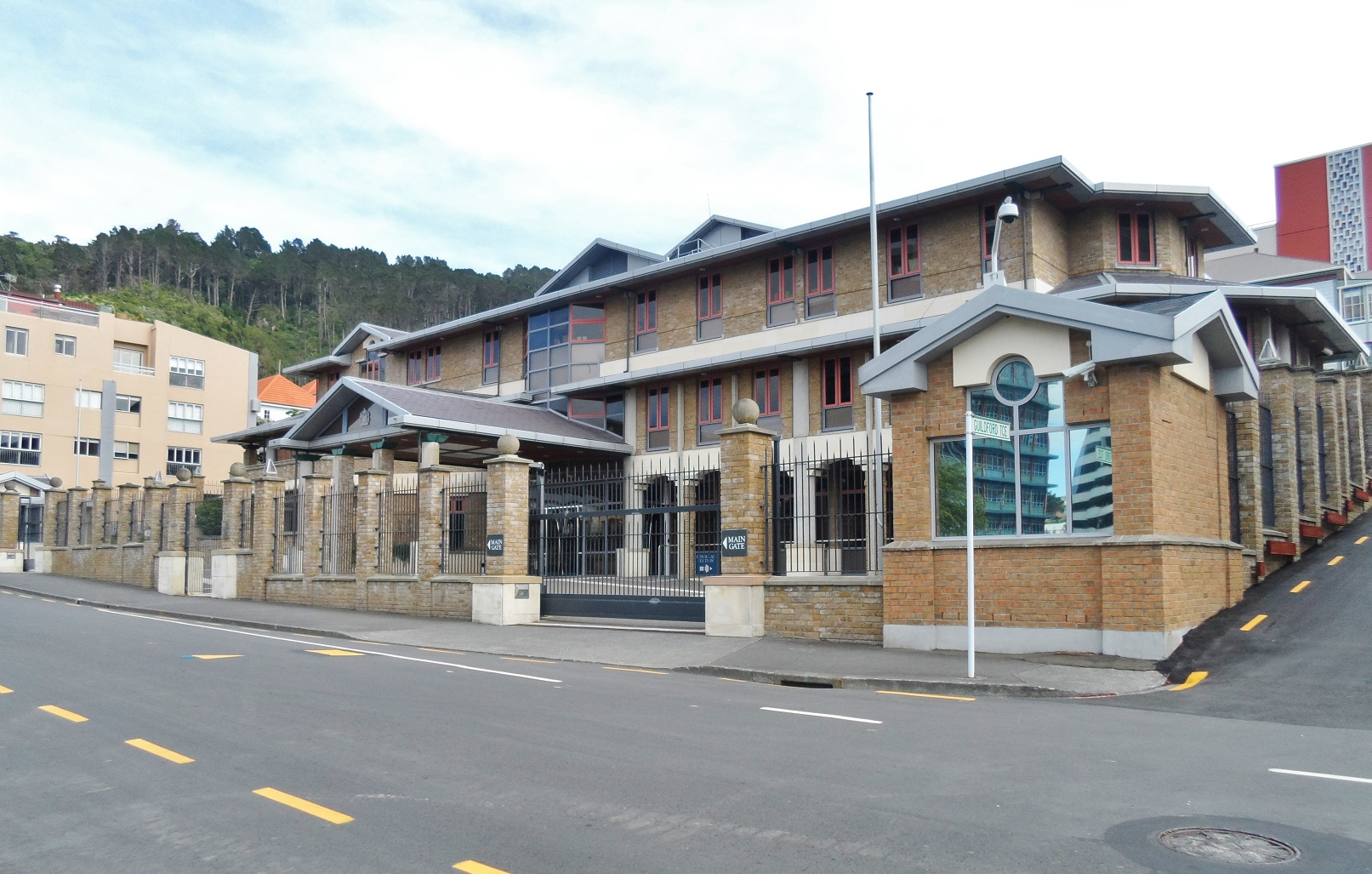
British High Commission in Wellington, New Zealand

A British High Commission is a British diplomatic mission, equivalent to an embassy, found in countries that are members of the Commonwealth of Nations. Their general purpose is to provide diplomatic relationships as well as travel information, passports, dual-citizenship information, and other services between Commonwealth states.

Where some Commonwealth countries are not represented in another Commonwealth country, the British High Commission can assist such Commonwealth countries' citizens in some cases.

William Henry Clark served as Britain's first high commissioner (1928–1934), sent to Ottawa at the request of the Canadian prime minister in the aftermath of the King–Byng affair and the Balfour Declaration of 1926. Appointed by the Dominions Office, the High Commissioner to Canada assumed the governor general's role as agent of the British government.

Some countries that were outside the Commonwealth, but have now returned to their membership of the Commonwealth, have replaced their embassies and ambassadors with High Commissions and High Commissioners.

== List of British High Commissions and British High Commissioners ==
- High Commission of the United Kingdom, Abuja, Nigeria – Richard Montgomery CMG (since April 2023)
- High Commission of the United Kingdom, Accra, Ghana – Christian Rogg (since July 2025)
- High Commission of the United Kingdom, Apia, Samoa – Gareth Hoar CVO (since June 2023)
- High Commission of the United Kingdom, Bandar Seri Begawan, Brunei – Ken O'Flaherty (since August 2025)
- High Commission of the United Kingdom, Banjul, Gambia – Harriet King (since September 2023)
- High Commission of the United Kingdom, Belmopan, Belize – Alistair White (since June 2025)
- High Commission of the United Kingdom, Bridgetown, Barbados – Simon Mustard (since May 2025)
- High Commission of the United Kingdom, Canberra, Australia – Dame Sarah MacIntosh DCMG (since April 2025)
- High Commission of the United Kingdom, Castries, St. Lucia – see Bridgetown, Barbados
- High Commission of the United Kingdom, Colombo, Sri Lanka – Andrew Patrick (since August 2023)
- High Commission of the United Kingdom, Dar es Salaam, Tanzania – Marianne Young (since August 2024)
- High Commission of the United Kingdom, Dhaka, Bangladesh – Sarah Cooke (since April/May 2023)
- High Commission of the United Kingdom, Freetown, Sierra Leone – Josephine Gauld LVO (since September 2024)
- High Commission of the United Kingdom, Gaborone, Botswana – Giles Enticknap MBE (since August 2024)
- High Commission of the United Kingdom, Georgetown, Guyana – Jane Miller OBE (since July 2021)
- High Commission of the United Kingdom, Honiara, Solomon Islands – Paul Turner (since January 2025)
- High Commission of the United Kingdom, Islamabad, Pakistan – Jane Marriott CMG OBE (since July 2023)
- High Commission of the United Kingdom, Kampala, Uganda – Lisa Chesney MBE (since October 2024)
- High Commission of the United Kingdom, Kigali, Rwanda – Alison Thorpe (since September 2024)
- High Commission of the United Kingdom, Kingston, Jamaica – Alicia Herbert OBE (since September 2025)
- High Commission of the United Kingdom, Kuala Lumpur, Malaysia – Ajay Sharma CMG (since April 2025)
- High Commission of the United Kingdom, Lilongwe, Malawi – Fiona Ritchie (since July 2022)
- High Commission of the United Kingdom, Lusaka, Zambia – Rebecca Terzeon (since January 2025)
- High Commission of the United Kingdom, Maputo, Mozambique – Helen Lewis (since October 2022)
- High Commission of the United Kingdom, Maseru, Lesotho - Martine Sobey (since September 2025)
- High Commission of the United Kingdom, Mbabane, Eswatini - Colin Wells (since August 2024)
- High Commission of the United Kingdom, Nairobi, Kenya – Neil Wigan CVO OBE (since July 2023)
- High Commission of the United Kingdom, Nassau, The Bahamas - Smita Rossetti (since August 2025)
- High Commission of the United Kingdom, New Delhi, India – Lindy Cameron CB OBE (since April 2024)
- High Commission of the United Kingdom, Nicosia, Cyprus – Michael Tatham CMG (since November 2024)
- High Commission of the United Kingdom, Nukuʻalofa, Tonga – Philip Malone LVO (since May 2024)
- High Commission of the United Kingdom, Ottawa, Canada – Robert Tinline (since February 2025)
- High Commission of the United Kingdom, Port Louis, Mauritius – Paul Brummell CMG (since July 2025)
- High Commission of the United Kingdom, Port Moresby, Papua New Guinea – Anne Macro (since September 2023)
- High Commission of the United Kingdom, Port of Spain, Trinidad and Tobago – Jon Dean (since December 2024)
- High Commission of the United Kingdom, Port Vila, Vanuatu – Nicolette Brent MBE (since December 2022)
- High Commission of the United Kingdom, Pretoria, South Africa – Antony Phillipson CMG (since July 2021)
- High Commission of the United Kingdom, Singapore, Singapore – Nikesh Mehta OBE (since July 2024)
- High Commission of the United Kingdom, Suva, Fiji – Kanbar Hossein-Bor (since July 2025)
- High Commission of the United Kingdom, Valletta, Malta – Victoria Busby OBE (since September 2025)
- High Commission of the United Kingdom, Victoria, Seychelles – Jeffrey Glekin (since October 2023)
- High Commission of the United Kingdom, Wellington, New Zealand – Louise Cantillon (since August 2026)
- High Commission of the United Kingdom, Windhoek, Namibia – Neil Bradley (since April 2025)
- High Commission of the United Kingdom, Yaounde, Cameroon – Matt Woods (since September 2024)

== See also ==
- High commissioner (Commonwealth)
- Diplomatic missions of the United Kingdom
