= CARIFORUM =

Intergovernment forum

The Caribbean Forum (CARIFORUM) is a subgroup of the Organisation of African, Caribbean and Pacific States and serves as a base for economic dialogue with the European Union. It was established in 1992. Its membership comprises the 15 Caribbean Community states, along with the Dominican Republic. In 2008, they signed the CARIFORUM-EU Economic Partnership Agreement with the European Union. Guyana and Haiti expressed reservations and did not attend the initial signing ceremony.

== See also ==
- Association of Caribbean States
- CARIFORUM–United Kingdom Economic Partnership Agreement
- Community of Latin American and Caribbean States
- Dominican Republic–Central America Free Trade Agreement
- EU-African, Caribbean and Pacific Group of States
  - ACP-EU Development Cooperation
  - EU-ACP Economic Partnership Agreements (EPA) with the ACP countries
  - ACP–EU Joint Parliamentary Assembly
