= Singapore–United Kingdom relations =

- Singapore: United Kingdom

Diplomatic mission
- Singaporean High Commission, London: British High Commission, Singapore

Envoy
- High Commissioner Ng Teck Hean: High Commissioner Nikesh Mehta

Singapore–United Kingdom relations, also referred to as British–Singaporean relations, refers to the bilateral relations between the Republic of Singapore and the United Kingdom of Great Britain and Northern Ireland. Both countries are full members of the Commonwealth of Nations and are marked by historical, cultural, institutional and language ties, extensive people-to-people links, aligned security interests, sporting tournaments, and significant trade and investment co-operation.

== Country comparison ==
Common name	Singapore	United Kingdom
Official name	Republic of Singapore	United Kingdom of Great Britain and Northern Ireland
Coat of Arms		
Flag	Singapore	United Kingdom
Population	5,638,700	67,886,004
Area	725.7 km^{2} (280.2 sq mi)	242,495 km^{2} (93,628 sq mi)
Population Density	7,804/km^{2} (20,210/sq mi)	270.1/km^{2} (700/sq mi)
Time zones	1	1 (Note: The United Kingdom (i.e. England, Northern Ireland, Scotland, and Wales has 1 standard time zone. The overseas territories and crown dependencies bring the total to 9 time zones.)
Capital	Singapore (City-state)	London
Largest City	Singapore – 5,638,700 (City-state)	London – 8,961,989 (14,257,962 Metro)
Government	Unitary dominant-party parliamentary constitutional republic	Unitary parliamentary constitutional monarchy
Established	1299 (Founding of the Kingdom of Singapore); 9 August 1965 (Proclamation of Singapore)	1535 & 1542 (Annexation of Wales to England); 1603 (Union of the Crowns); 1707 (Acts of Union of England and Scotland)
Head of State	Tharman Shanmugaratnam	Charles III
Head of Government	Lawrence Wong	Andy Burnham
Deputy Leader	Heng Swee Keat	vacant (Note: Deputy Prime Minister.)
Legislature	Parliament of Singapore	Parliament of the United Kingdom
Official/National Languages	English, Mandarin Chinese, Malay, Tamil	English (Note: Scots, Ulster Scots, Welsh, Cornish, Scottish Gaelic and Irish are classed as regional or minority languages under the Council of Europe's European Charter for Regional or Minority Languages. These include defined obligations to promote those languages. See also Languages of the United Kingdom. Welsh has limited de jure official status in Wales, as well as in the provision of national government services provided for Wales.)
National Anthem	Majulah Singapura (Onward Singapore)	God Save the King (Note: There is no authorised version of the national anthem as the words are a matter of tradition; only the first verse is usually sung. No law was passed making "God Save the King" the official anthem. In the English tradition, such laws are not necessary; proclamation and usage are sufficient to make it the national anthem. "God Save the King" also serves as the Royal anthem for certain Commonwealth realms. The words King, he, him, his, used at present (in the reign of Charles III), are replaced by Queen, she, her when the monarch is female.)
National carrier	Singapore Airlines	British Airways
International airport	Changi Airport	Heathrow Airport
Public broadcasting	Mediacorp	BBC
Military	Singapore Armed Forces (SAF): Singapore Army (SA); Republic of Singapore Air Force (RSAF); Republic of Singapore Navy (RSN); Digital and Intelligence Service	British Armed Forces (Note: Also referred to as the Armed Forces of the United Kingdom or Her Majesty's Armed Forces.): British Army (BA); Royal Air Force (RAF); Royal Navy (RN); Royal Marines
Law Enforcement Agency	Singapore Police Force (SPF)	National Crime Agency (NCA)
GDP (nominal)	$372.807 billion	$2.744 trillion
GDP (nominal) per capita	$68,487	$41,030
GDP (PPP)	$615.698 billion	$3.131 trillion
GDP (PPP) per capita	$107,604	$46,827
Currency	Singapore dollar (SG$)	Pound sterling (GB£)
Human Development Index	0.935 (very high)	0.920 (very high)

== History ==
Britain first established a settlement on the island of Singapore in 1819 under Sir Thomas Stamford Raffles, and took possession of the whole island in 1823. It formally became a British colony in 1824, and remained in British hands (apart from the Japanese occupation of 1941-45) until 1963, until the island was granted independence as part of Malaysia. Between 1963 and 1965, Singapore formed part of Malaysia. The British Armed Forces maintained a presence in Singapore at the request of the founding Prime Minister Lee Kuan Yew for stability reasons and to allow for a gradual transition to independence and self-reliance. After the end of the Malayan Emergency and Konfrontasi, the British military gradually withdrew during the 1960s and 1970s, with the infrastructure turned over to the fledgling Singapore Armed Forces.

As a result of the long historical relationship, English is one of Singapore's 4 official languages (see Singapore English).

== Bilateral relations ==
The United Kingdom co-operates with Singapore on a wide range of international issues. Singapore's non-permanent membership of the UN Security Council (2001/02) further intensified bilateral contacts on key issues affecting international peace and security. The UK and Singapore have also been closely co-operating in the area of counter terrorism and counter proliferation, both politically and operationally.

=== Defence ===
Since 1971, the two countries have co-operated militarily through the Five Power Defence Arrangements, which involve annual joint exercises with other partners Malaysia, Australia and New Zealand. The UK has a defence attaché in Singapore and a logistics supply depot, known as the British Defence Singapore Support Unit (BDSSU), in Sembawang. In contrast, Singapore has no military attaché in their High Commission in London. An EU Centre report suggests that Singapore's defence attaché to the UK is located in the embassy in Paris. A recent news report stated that the UK wished to increase its defence cooperation with Singapore.

=== Trade and investment ===
Singapore is the United Kingdom's largest trading partner in Southeast Asia, with two thirds of UK exports to this region flowing into Singapore. UK exports of goods only to Singapore in 2010 were valued at £3.29billion, a 15% increase from 2009 while imports of goods from Singapore in 2010 were valued at £3.99billion, an 18% increase from 2009. The top exports of UK goods to Singapore are power generating machinery, beverages and general industrial machinery while the top exported goods from Singapore were organic chemical, power generating machinery and office machines. As of 2009, Singapore was the UK's 11th largest market for services exports.

There are few import tariffs from Singapore who supports the World Trade Organization process fully. Singapore was the first ASEAN country to commence negotiations with the EU for a bilateral Free Trade Agreement (FTA). The two countries signed a continuity free trade agreement on 10 December 2020, which came into effect on 1 January 2021. The United Kingdom has completed negotiations to accede to Comprehensive and Progressive Agreement for Trans-Pacific Partnership on 31 March 2023, of which Singapore is a founding member.

The UK and Singapore have signed a Digital Economy Agreement (DEA). As a result of the agreement, businesses and consumers can now benefit from: open digital markets, including guaranteed tariff-free flow of digital content, free flow of trusted data guaranteed protections for personal data and intellectual property, and cheaper trade through the adoption of digital trading systems.

The UK is the fourth largest foreign investor in Singapore with cumulative stock of £23.5 billion at end 2009. There are over 31,000 British nationals and some 700 British companies in Singapore. Many of the major long-term British investors have increased their footprint in Singapore recently, including Barclays, Dyson, HSBC, Rolls-Royce, Shell and Standard Chartered. There has also been a significant increase in the number of British SMEs entering the market and British universities establishing collaborative partnerships with Singapore's educational institutions.

The UK attracts over two thirds of all Singaporean investment into the European Union with a cumulative stock of £20.6 billion with financial and insurance services, real estate and ICT being the most significant sectors.

=== State visits ===
In 2011, six dignitaries from the United Kingdom visited Singapore, including Peter Ricketts, the national security advisor, in January, Martin Donnelly, BIS permanent secretary, in February, John Aston, FCO special representative for climate change, in March, Jeremy Browne, minister of state at the Foreign and Commonwealth Office, in April, Liam Fox, secretary of state for defence, in June and The Duke of York in September. The two Singaporean dignitaries who visited the United Kingdom in 2011 are Ow Foong Pheng, permanent secretary Singapore Ministry of Trade & Industry in September and Tony Tan, President of Singapore in December. In October 2014, Tony Tan made the first official state visit of a president of Singapore to the United Kingdom and was hosted by Queen Elizabeth II.

== Academic exchanges ==
Education links between Singapore and the United Kingdom are strong. As of 2011, more than 3,000 Singaporeans were studying in the United Kingdom and the British Council estimate that around 80,000 UK qualifications are awarded annually in Singapore through "twinning" programmes. Due to Singapore's membership in the Commonwealth, Singaporean students qualify for scholarships such as the Commonwealth Scholarship and Fellowship Plan and Chevening Scholarship to further their studies in the United Kingdom. Links in the arts are also strong with many British artists and organisations being invited to perform and the established presence of British music examination boards such as ABRSM.

The British Council has a large presence teaching English to around 20,000 Singaporeans and foreign nationals. Current British Council projects focus on the internationalisation of education, developing young leaders to take action against climate change and the exchange of knowledge and expertise in the arts and creative industries.

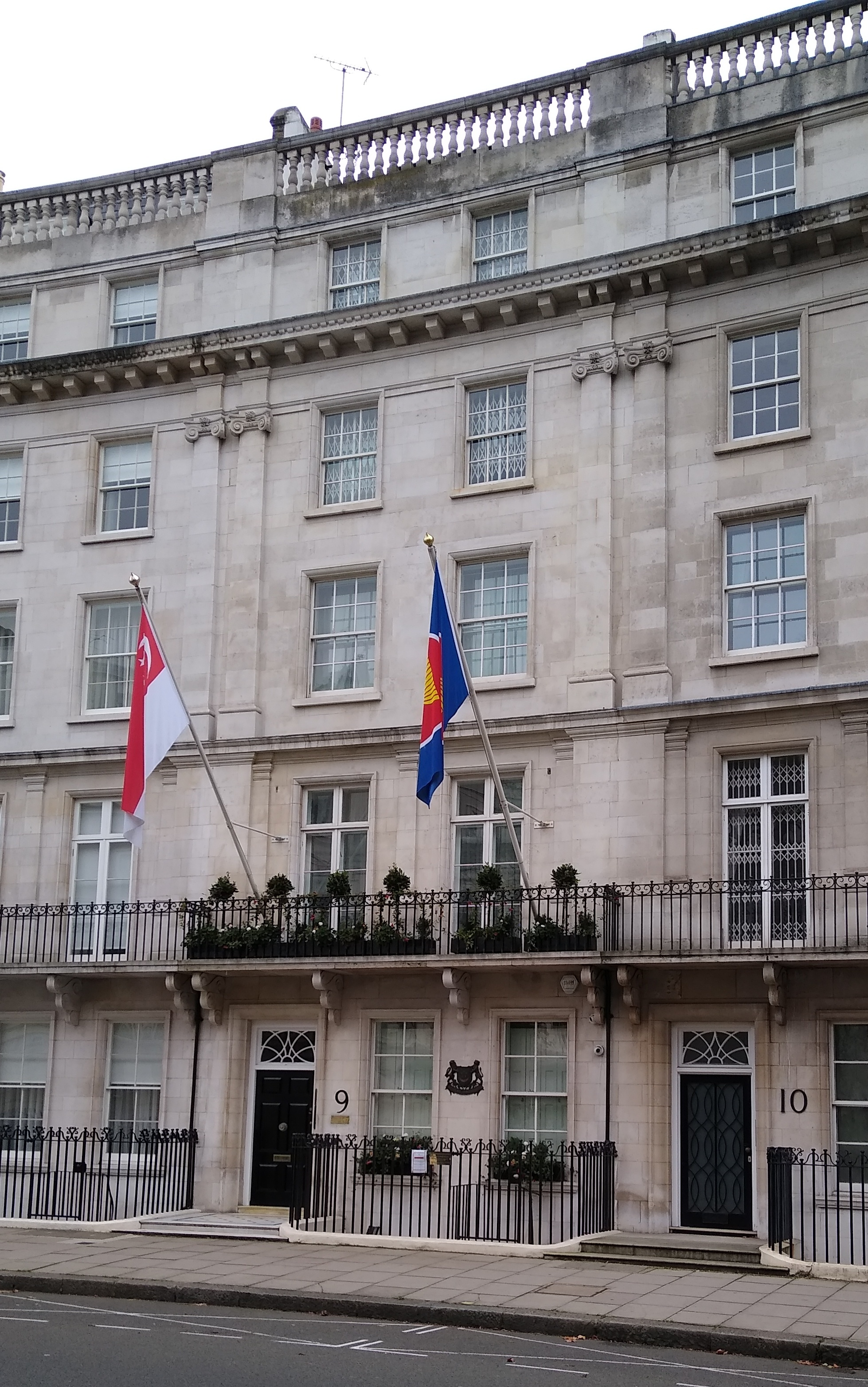
High Commission of Singapore in London

== Resident diplomatic missions ==
- Singapore has a high commission in London.
- United Kingdom has a high commission in Singapore.

== See also ==
- High Commission of Singapore, London
- List of high commissioners of the United Kingdom to Singapore
- Singaporeans in the United Kingdom
- Accession of the United Kingdom to CPTPP
