= Serbia–United Kingdom relations =

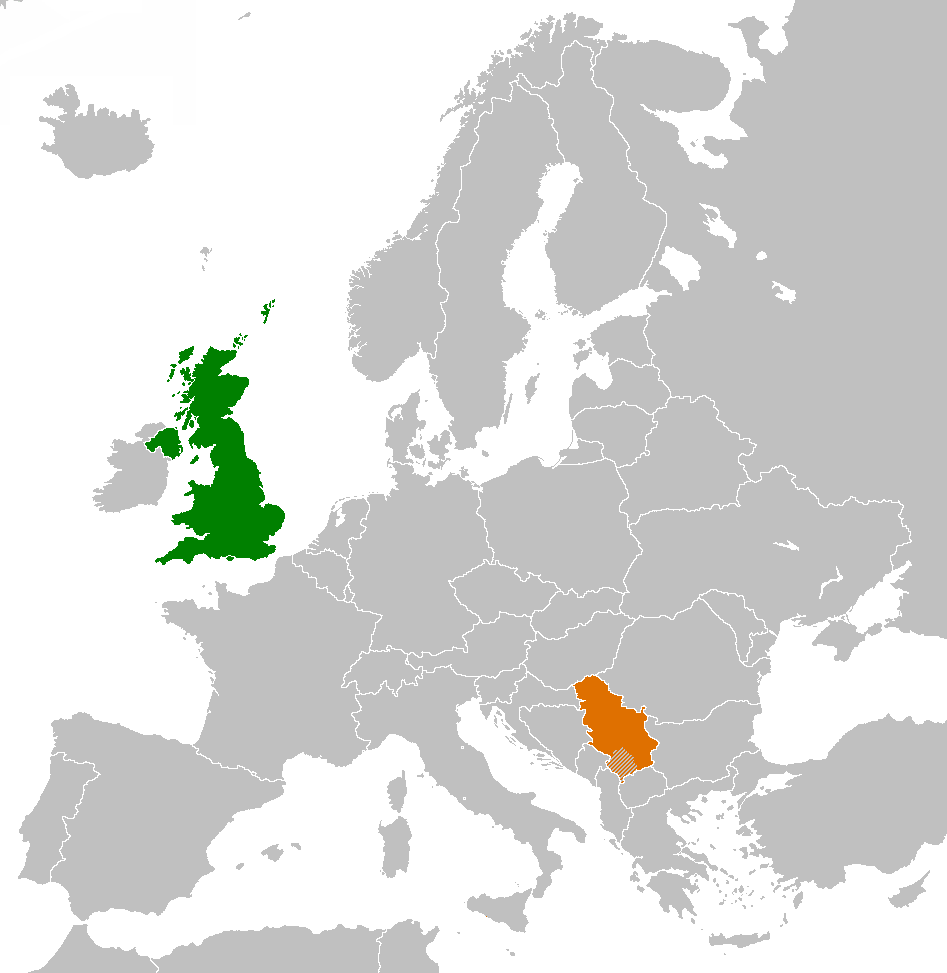

- United Kingdom: Serbia

Serbia and the United Kingdom maintain diplomatic relations established in 1837. However this is not considered the establishment of full diplomatic relations as the United Kingdom did not recognise the independence of Serbia from the Ottoman Empire. Both countries established full diplomatic relations in 1870, with the signing of the Anglo–Serbian Treaty of Friendship and Commerce. From 1918 to 2006, the United Kingdom maintained relations with the Kingdom of Yugoslavia, the Socialist Federal Republic of Yugoslavia (SFRY), and the Federal Republic of Yugoslavia (FRY) (later Serbia and Montenegro), of which Serbia is considered shared (SFRY) or sole (FRY) legal successor.

== History ==
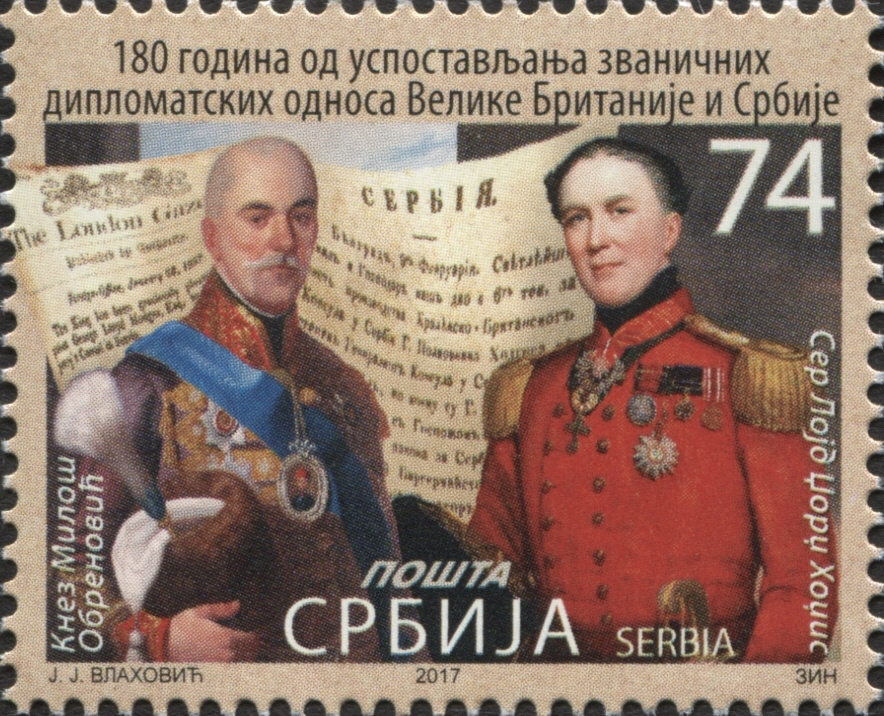
180th Anniversary of Serbia-United Kingdom relations on 2017 post stamp of Serbia, showing Miloš Obrenović I of Serbia and sir George Lloyd Hodges

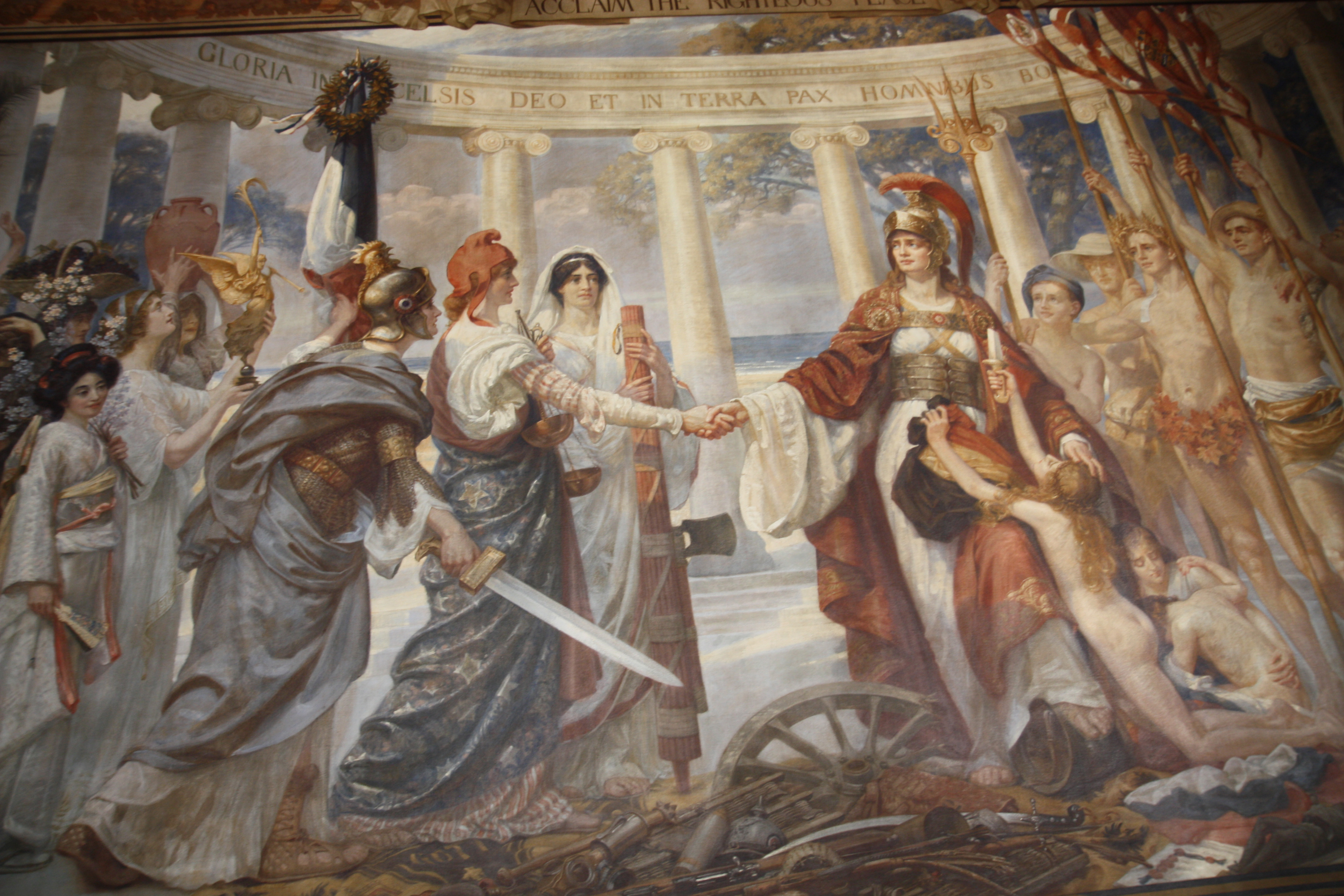
The mural Britannia Pacificatrix by Sigismund Goetze in the British Foreign Office. The mural portrays Britain and the Allies, Serbia is shown as one of the little girls.

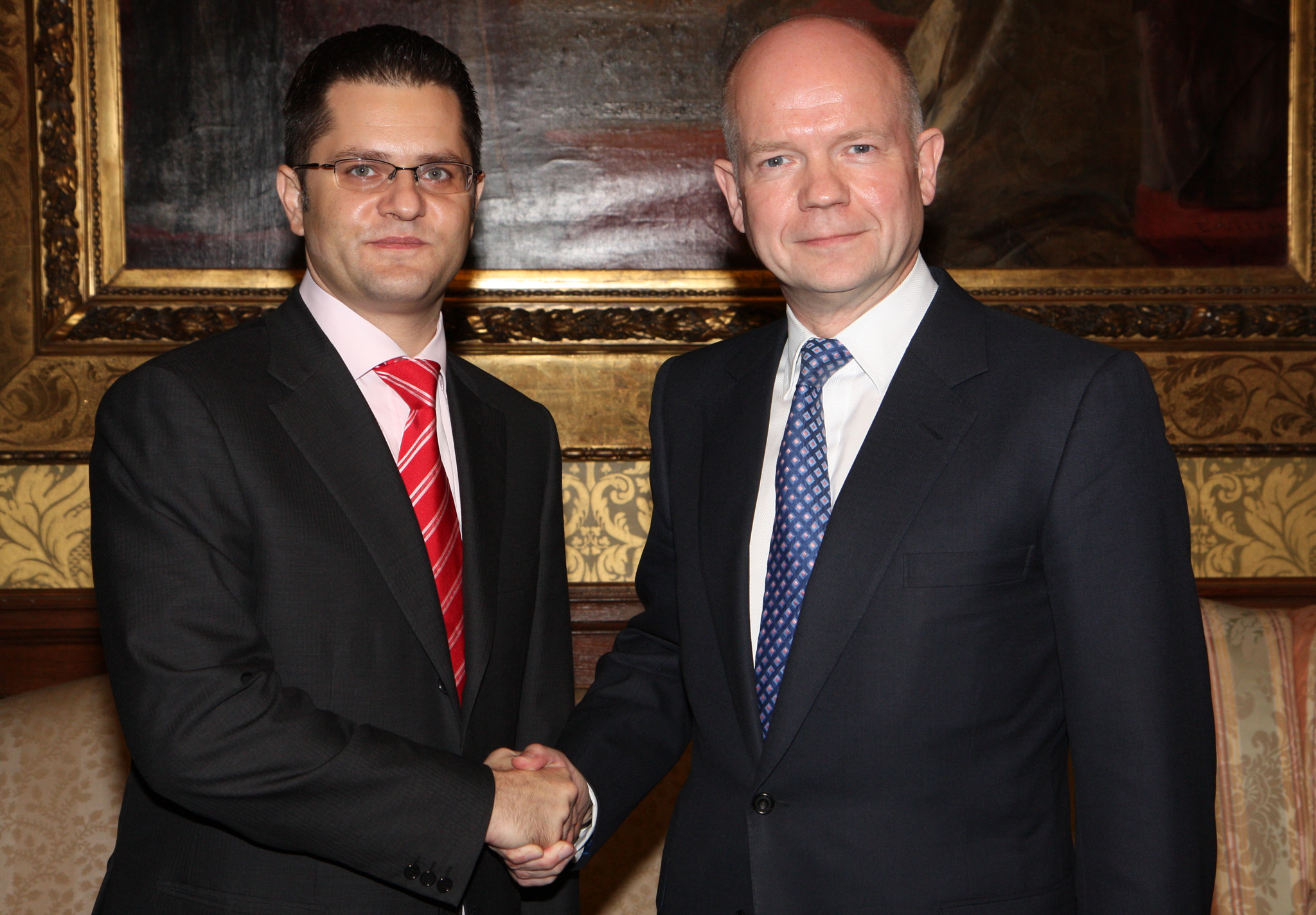
Serbian Foreign Minister Vuk Jeremić with British Foreign Secretary William Hague in London, 2011

During Gascoyne-Cecil's first tenure as prime minister from 1885–1886, his cabinet held negative views of Kingdom of Serbia and instead supported the Kingdom of Bulgaria. A Times correspondent claimed that Serbia was the biggest threat to peace in the Balkans. This view was refuted by archeologist Arthur Evans, who stated that Kosovo Serbs were facing terror from the hand of local Albanian population, with murders being a daily occurrence.

The Kingdom of Serbia and the United Kingdom were allies in World War I. British influence in Serbia became more relevant only after WWI. Around 350 Serb pupils and students received an education in the United Kingdom during this period and afterwards, under the supervision of university professor Pavle Popović, who was a visiting professor at King's College. The Serbian Relief Fund and Serbian Minister's Fund were formed for the purpose of providing financial and other aid to Serb students in the United Kingdom, and a hostel for Serb students was opened. In the 1920s, Serbs went to Great Britain to study banking, finances and economics, while in the 1930s mining engineering was the main field of study.

In the Kingdom of Yugoslavia, the United Kingdom was perceived as a friendly country and an ally. Serb elites, based mostly in Belgrade, like Slobodan Jovanović and Bogdan Bogdanović considered that Serbs and the British shared a joint love of liberty and fierce patriotism, and they advocated looking upon United Kingdom in order to further develop democracy in the country.

As early as the 1920s, London made its way to Serbia, mostly through banks. In 1920, the British Trade Corporation was founded in Belgrade. Although this bank only operated until 1928, its work led to serious improvements in the local industry, primarily mining. In the same period, relations between the Serbian Orthodox Church and the Church of England were established. Several big donations of books by British to Serbian libraries took place in the 1920s. British citizens were the main foreign sponsors of scientific research in the interwar period. Archaeological excavations in Vinča were funded by sir Charles Hyde.

Bishop Nikolaj Velimirović played an important role in furthering the relations between the two countries. He was held in high regard in London, and Velimirović was the first Orthodox clergyman to preach at St. Paul’s Cathedral. He established firm relations between the Serbian Orthodox Church with the Church of England.

An English Language and Literature Department was formed in Belgrade in 1929. Cultural and other exchanges became popular in the interwar period. A number of societies of Yugoslav-British friendship were functioning in Belgrade in 1930s, with full support from the Yugoslav government. Several important local cultural figures were part of the friendship society, such as Isidora Sekulić, Raša Plaović, and Viktor Novak. As of 1935, the English language was taught in schools in Serbia, but to a smaller degree compared to French and German, due to lack of teachers and political reasons. A total of 75 students with Yugoslav citizenship were enrolled at British faculties in the Interwar period, of which six got their PhD in the country, mostly in the subject of English literature.

Despite the Kingdom of Yugoslavia's entry in the Axis Powers on March 25, 1941 (agreeing to permit transit through its territory to German troops headed for Greece), following the Yugoslav coup d'état(that United Kingdom supported and was involved in) , the Kingdom of Yugoslavia entered World War II on the Allied side.

== Economic relations ==
Bilaterally the two countries have a Partnership, Trade and Cooperation Agreement, a Double Taxation Convention, an Investment Agreement, and a Reciprocal Healthcare Agreement. The Partnership, Trade and Cooperation Agreement is a continuity trade agreement, based on the EU free trade agreement, which entered into force in 2021. Trade between two countries amounted to $823 million in 2023; Serbia's merchandise export to the United Kingdom were about $464 million; British exports were standing at roughly $359 million.

British companies present in Serbia include British American Tobacco (cigarette manufacturing plant in Vranje), Nomad Foods (owner of Frikom frozen foods company in Belgrade), DS Smith (packaging plants in Valjevo and Kruševac).

== Cultural cooperation ==
Belgrade was one of the first eight cities in which the British Council opened its offices overseas, in 1940. During the World War II the work was disrupted, but was resumed as early as 1945. The first British Council Library was set up as part of the operation in 1946. Development of cultural and technical cooperation was also very rapid with first exchanges and visits taking place in 1947.

== Immigration from Serbia ==
According to data from the 2021–2022 censuses, there were 11,272 Serbia-born people living in the United Kingdom, while estimated number of people of Serb ethnic descent (including British citizens with full or partial Serb ethnic descent) stands at around 70,000.

== Resident diplomatic missions ==
- Serbia maintains an embassy in London.
- The United Kingdom is accredited to Serbia through its embassy in Belgrade.
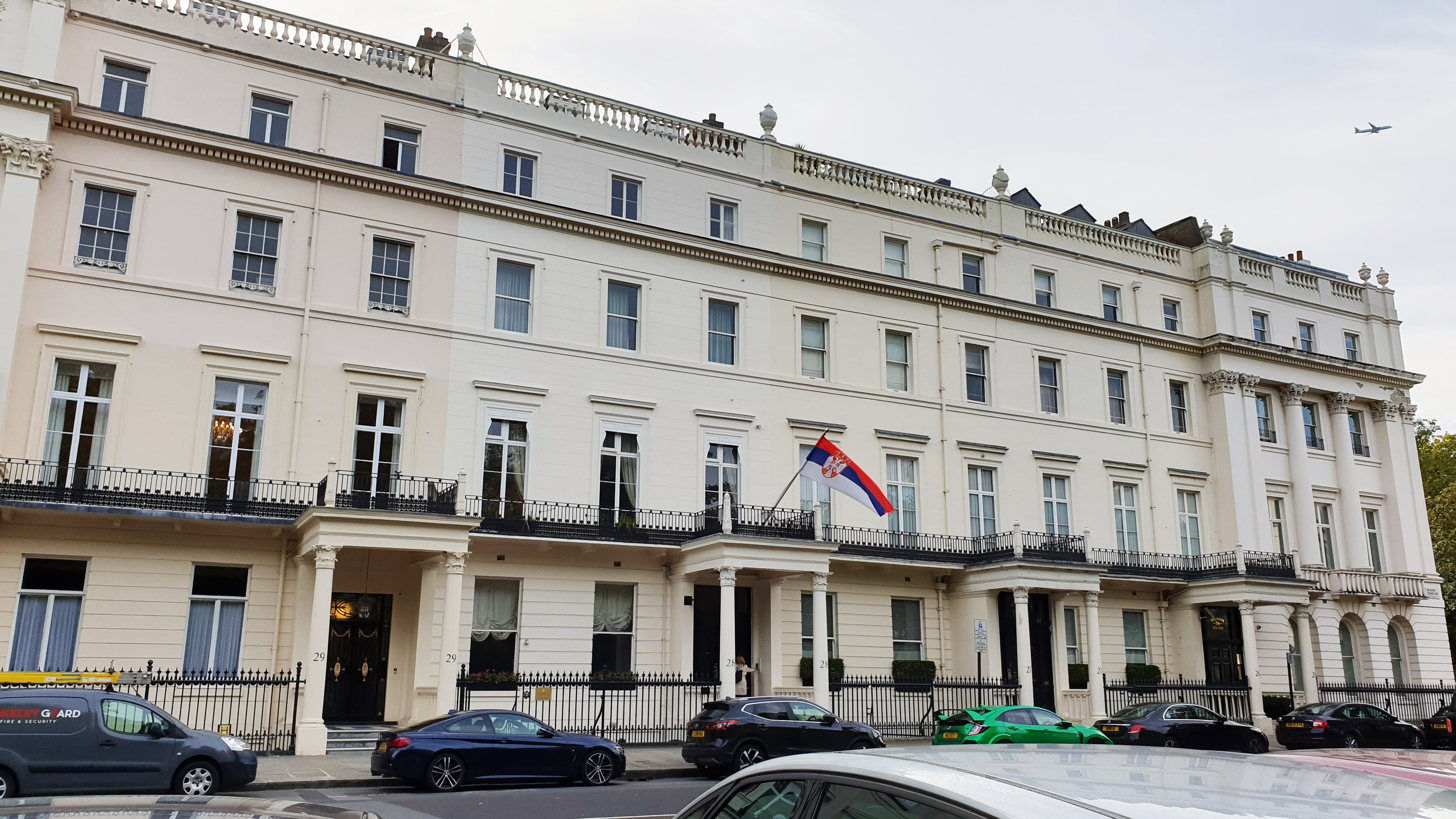
Embassy of Serbia in London

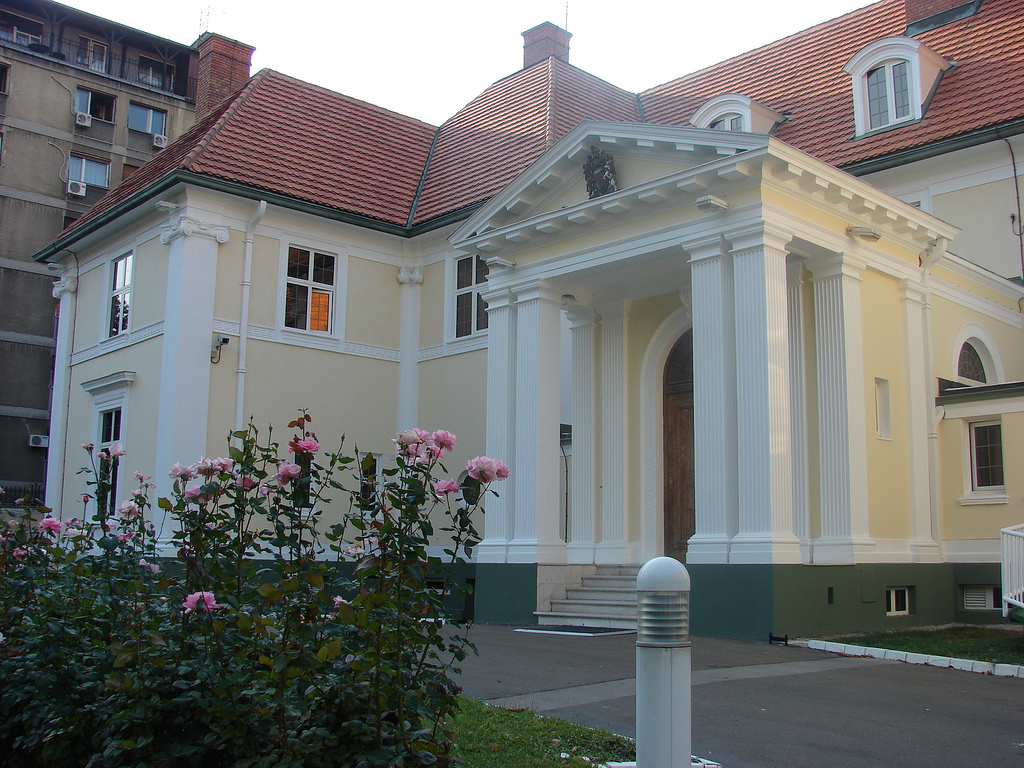
Embassy of the United Kingdom in Belgrade

== See also ==
- Foreign relations of Serbia
- Foreign relations of the United Kingdom
- United Kingdom–Yugoslavia relations

== Sources and further reading ==
- Antić, Čedomir D. "Crisis and Armament: Economic Relations Between Great Britain and Serbia 1910–1912." Balcanica 36 (2005): 151-163 online.
- Bataković, Dušan T. "Serbia and Greece in the First World War: an overview." Balkan Studies 45.1 (2004): 59-80 online.
- Antić, Čedomir. Ralph Paget: a diplomat in Serbia (Institute for Balkan Studies, Serbian Academy of Sciences and Arts, 2006) online free.
- Boyd, James. "Representing the Western Balkans, Post-war Understandings: A discourse analysis of contemporary representations of Bosnia, Serbia and Croatia in UK press media." (2018) online.
- Gašić, Ranka (2005). Beograd u hodu ka Evropi: Kulturni uticaji Britanije i Nemačke na beogradsku elitu 1918–1941. Belgrade: Institut za savremenu istoriju. ISBN 86-7403-085-8.
- Gavrilović, Michael. "The Early Diplomatic Relations of Great Britain and Serbia." Slavonic Review (1922): 1#1 86-109 online.
  - Gavrilović, Michael. "The Early Diplomatic Relations of Great Britain and Serbia.(II)." Slavonic Review (1922): 333-351 online.
  - Gavrilović, Michael. "The Early Diplomatic Relations of Great Britain and Serbia.(III)." Slavonic Review (1923): 552-560 online.
- Glaurdić, Josip. The hour of Europe: Western powers and the breakup of Yugoslavia (Yale UP, 2011).
- Hodge, Carole. Britain and the Balkans: 1991 until the Present (Routledge, 2006).
- McCourt, David. "Embracing humanitarian intervention: Atlanticism and the UK interventions in Bosnia and Kosovo." British Journal of Politics and International Relations 15.2 (2013): 246-262 online.
- Markovich, Slobodan G., ed. British-Serbian Relations from the 18th to the 21st Centuries (Faculty of Political Science of the University of Belgrade [and] Zepter Book World, 2018) online link.
- Pavlowitch, Stevan K. Anglo-Russian rivalry in Serbia 1837-1839 (1961)
- Simms, Brendan. Unfinest hour: Britain and the destruction of Bosnia (Penguin UK, 2002).
