= List of official overseas trips made by Anne, Princess Royal =

This is a list of official overseas visits and Commonwealth tours made by Anne, Princess Royal. Princess Anne has made overseas trips for many decades representing either her mother Elizabeth II or her brother Charles III. She is often accompanied by her husband, Sir Tim Laurence.

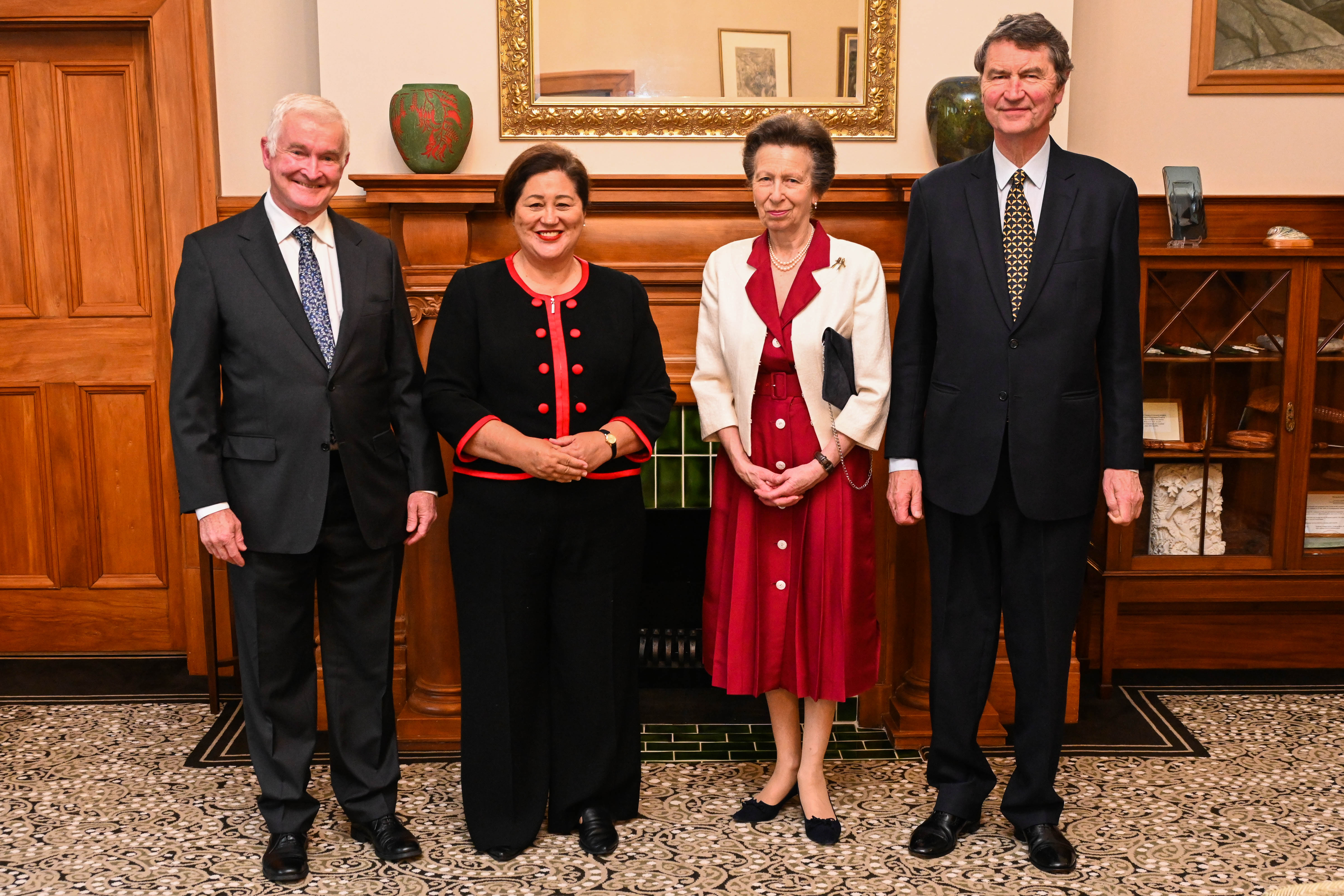
Anne at Government House, Wellington in 2023

== List ==
| Date | Country | Areas visited | Details |
|---|---|---|---|
| 3–12 February 1998 | Japan | | to attend the Winter Olympics in Nagano |
| 11–15 March 1998 | Ghana | | |
| 15–18 March 1998 | Ivory Coast | | |
| 4 June 1998 | Switzerland | | attended an official ceremony to commemorate the One Hundred and Fiftieth Anniversary of the Modern Swiss Constitution at the Chamber of the National Council, Bundeshaus, Berne |
| 25–28 June 1998 | Canada | | |
| 22–25 September 1998 | Uganda | | |
| 25–27 September 1998 | Tanzania | Dar es Salaam, Ngara, Rusomo, Kilimanjaro, Arusha | |
| 27–30 September 1998 | Kenya | Nairobi, Gigiri, Lokichokio, Mathare | Visit Save the Children and UN humanitarian initiatives |
| 30 September–2 October 1998 | Mauritius | Floreal, Port Louis, Mont Ferret | |
| 8–11 March 1999 | Japan | Tokyo, Kyoto, Osaka | |
| 11–14 March 1999 | Philippines | | |
| 14–18 March 1999 | New Zealand | Auckland, Wellington | |
| 26–27 April 1999 | Cyprus | | |
| 27–30 April 1999 | Egypt | | |
| 2 July 1999 | Macedonia, Kosovo | | |
| 22–26 July 1999 | Canada | | |
| 6 September 1999 | Germany | | visit RAF Bruggen, Niederkruchten |
| 17 September 1999 | Luxembourg | | to open the Henry Moore exhibition at the Hotel de Ville |
| 5–7 October 1999 | Bermuda | | |
| 22–26 November 1999 | Botswana | | |
| 26–29 November 1999 | Malawi | | |
| 28 June 2004 | Gibraltar | Casemates Square and John Mackintosh Square | Accompanied by Timothy Laurence, the Princess visited Gibraltar, where she was received by the Governor, Sir Francis Richards, upon arrival at RAF Gibraltar. |
| 18 November 2023 | Gibraltar | Irish Town | Accompanied by Sir Tim Laurence, the Princess reopened the renovated premises of the Royal Gibraltar Regiment Association. |
| 10–12 February 2024 | Sri Lanka | Colombo | Accompanied by Sir Tim Laurence, the Princess attended commemorations for the 75th anniversary of Sri Lanka-United Kingdom relations. |
| 24–25 February 2024 | Namibia | Windhoek | Attended the burial service for former president Hage Gottfried Geingob. |
| 1 March 2024 | Dubai | Mina Jebel, Port Rashid | Attended a Women in Shipping and Trading Conference Panel Discussion. |
| 3–5 May 2024 | Canada | Victoria, British Columbia | Accompanied by Sir Tim Laurence, the Princess attended a reception and dinner by the Lieutenant Governor. |
| 20–22 May 2024 | Norway | Oslo | Attended commemorative events for the Norwegian Resistance movement in World War 2. |
| 4 June 2024 | France | Normandy | Accompanied by Sir Tim Laurence, the Princess attended commemorations for the 80th anniversary of the D-Day Landings. |
| 22 July – 1 August 2024 | France | Paris | Accompanied by Sir Tim Laurence, the Princess attended the XXXIII Summer Olympiad. |
| 22 September 2024 | Netherlands | Oosterbeek | Accompanied by Sir Tim Laurence, the Princess attended commemorations for the 80th anniversary of the Battle of Arnhem. |
| 26 September 2024 | France | Loos-en-Gohelle | Inaugurated an extension of the Loos British Cemetery and attended a reburial service of unknown soldiers. |
| 21–22 January 2025 | South Africa | Cape Town | Opened the Cape Town Labour Corps Memorial. |
| 15 March 2025 | France | Paris | Accompanied by Sir Tim Laurece, the Princess attended a rugby match between Scotland and France. |
| 18–21 March 2025 | Greece | Costa Navarino | Attended a session of the International Olympic Committee. |
| 23–25 April 2025 | Turkey | Gallipoli | Accompanied by Sir Tim Laurence, the Princess attended commemorative events for ANZAC Day. |
| 9 May 2025 | Guernsey | St Peter Port | Accompanied by Sir Tim Laurence, the Princess attended a parade commemorating 80 years since the island's liberation. |
| 10 May 2025 | Sark | Chasse-Marais | Accompanied by Sir Tim Laurence, the Princess visited the Sark Observatory. |
| 29 May–1 June 2025 | Barbados | Bridgetown | Visited the Barbados Olympic Association. |
| 7 July 2025 | Belgium | Ypres | Reopened the Menin Gate Memorial. |
| 6 August 2025 | Ireland | Dublin | Met President Michael D. Higgins, then attended the Royal Dublin Society Horse Show. |
| 30 September 2025 | Ukraine | Kyiv | Met President Volodymyr Zelenskyy, joined First Lady Olena Zelenska at a memorial for child victims of the Russian invasion, and visited the Child Rights Protection Centre. |
| 8–11 November 2025 | Australia | Sydney, Melbourne, Brisbane | Laid a wreath at the Sydney War Cemetery. |
| 12–13 November 2025 | Singapore | Kranji War Cemetery | Celebrated sixty years of Singapore-United Kingdom relations and visited war memorials as President of the Commonwealth War Graves Commission. |
| 2–13 February 2026 | Italy | Milan | Accompanied by Sir Tim Laurence, the Princess attended events of the XXV Winter Olympic Games. |
| 13–15 July 2026 | South Korea | Busan, Seoul, Ulsan | Accompanied by Sir Tim Laurence, the Princess attended events commemorating the 75th anniversary of the service and sacrifice of British soldiers who fought in the Korean War. She then visited HD Hyundai Heavy Industries' shipyard to commemorate the company's 56-year partnership with the United Kingdom before meeting with President Lee Jae Myung. |
| 15–18 July 2026 | Thailand | Bangkok | Accompanied by Sir Tim Laurence, the Princess met with King Vajiralongkorn and Queen Suthida. |
| 9 September 2026 | Norway | Oslo | Attended the state funeral of King Harald V. |

== See also ==
- List of official overseas trips made by Charles III
- List of state visits made by Elizabeth II
