= Serbia–United Kingdom Partnership, Trade and Cooperation Agreement =

Free trade agreement signed in 2021

Partnership, Trade and Cooperation Agreement between the Government of the United Kingdom of Great Britain and Northern Ireland and the Government of the Republic of Serbia
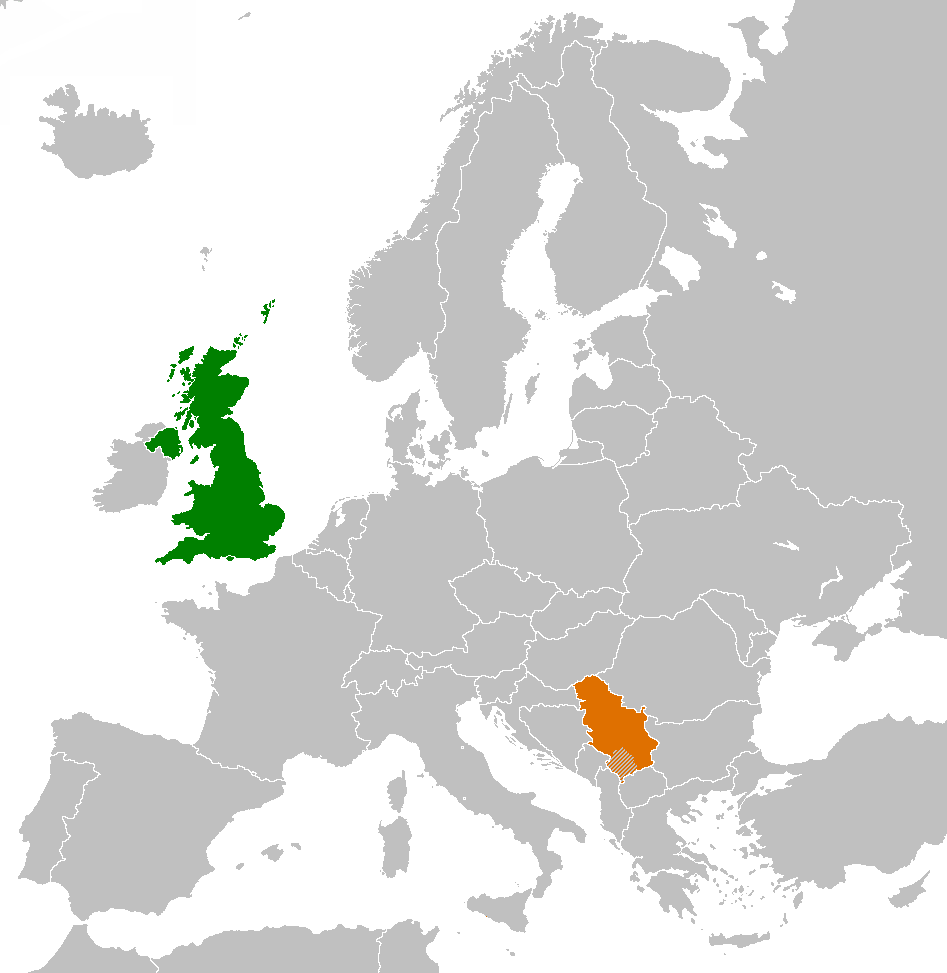
- Serbia United Kingdom
- Type: Free Trade Agreement and Economic Integration Agreement
- Context: Trade Continuity Agreement between Serbia and the United Kingdom
- Signed: 16 April 2021
- Location: Belgrade, Serbia
- Effective: 15 July 2021
- Provisional application: 20 May 2021
- Negotiators: Tatjana Matić; Sian MacLeod
- Parties: Serbia; United Kingdom
- Languages: English; Serbian

The Serbia–United Kingdom Partnership, Trade and Cooperation Agreement is a free trade agreement between Serbia and the United Kingdom. The agreement is a Trade Continuity Agreement that governs trade and broader cooperation between Serbia and the United Kingdom following the UK's withdrawal from the European Union.

Negotiations for this agreement were driven by the need to replace the arrangements previously covered by the Serbia–European Union Stabilisation and Association Agreement, which ceased to apply to the UK after Brexit. The new agreement closely replicates the effects of the EU-Serbia deal, preserving preferential trade conditions and establishing a free trade area for goods, while also providing a platform for further trade liberalization and cooperation in areas such as investment, intellectual property, and public procurement. The text of the trade part of the agreement is largely based on the provisions of the Stabilisation and Association Agreement, adapted to the specifics of the Serbia–UK relationship.

== History ==
From 1 April 2009 until 30 December 2020, trade between Serbia and the UK was governed by the Serbia–European Union Stabilisation and Association Agreement, while the United Kingdom was a member of the European Union.

Following the withdrawal of the United Kingdom from the European Union, Serbia and the UK signed the Serbia–UK Partnership, Trade and Cooperation Agreement on 16 April 2021. The Partnership, Trade and Cooperation Agreement is a continuity trade agreement, based on the EU free trade agreement, which entered into force on 20 May 2021.

The agreement was signed in Belgrade on 16 April 2021 by Her Majesty’s Ambassador to Serbia, Sian MacLeod OBE, representing the United Kingdom, and by the Serbian Minister of Trade, Tourism and Telecommunications, Tatjana Matić, representing Serbia. The signing took place in the Brown Salon of Belgrade’s Palace of Serbia, with both governments highlighting the importance of the agreement for maintaining and strengthening economic ties. The agreement was presented to the UK Parliament in February 2025 as Treaty Series No. 9 (2025). Following completion of domestic ratification procedures in both countries, the agreement entered into provisional application on 20 May 2021 and entered into force on 15 July 2021.

The objectives of the agreement include preserving the preferential trading terms that existed under the EU-Serbia arrangement, providing certainty for businesses and consumers, and supporting jobs and economic growth in both countries. The agreement also aims to facilitate further trade liberalization and strengthen cooperation in political, economic, security, and cultural fields. It reaffirms the UK’s support for governance reform in Serbia, with the goal of safeguarding a competitive business environment and an open, democratic society.

== Trade and Investment ==
Trade value between Serbia and the United Kingdom was worth £904 million in 2022.

The agreement has underpinned a growing trade relationship. In the four quarters to the end of Q4 2024, total trade in goods and services between the UK and Serbia reached £1.1 billion, with UK exports to Serbia amounting to £521 million and UK imports from Serbia totaling £562 million. Serbia ranked as the UK’s 88th largest trading partner during this period, accounting for 0.1% of total UK trade. The agreement has also contributed to foreign direct investment flows, with the UK’s outward FDI stock in Serbia at £225 million and Serbia’s inward FDI stock in the UK at £252 million at the end of 2023.

Major British companies such as Unilever, AstraZeneca, JCB, Jaguar Land Rover, and Rio Tinto have significant operations and investments in Serbia, reflecting the deepening business ties facilitated by the agreement. UK Export Finance has made over £3.5 billion available to finance projects in Serbia, supporting large-scale infrastructure and green initiatives.

== See also ==
- Economy of Serbia
- Economy of the United Kingdom
- Free trade agreements of the European Union
- Free trade agreements of the United Kingdom
- Serbia–United Kingdom relations
