= Moldova–United Kingdom relations =

- Moldova: United Kingdom

Diplomatic mission
- Embassy of Moldova, London: Embassy of the United Kingdom, Chișinău

Moldova–United Kingdom relations encompass the diplomatic, economic, and historical interactions between the Republic of Moldova and the United Kingdom of Great Britain and Northern Ireland. Both countries established diplomatic relations on 17 January 1992.

Both countries share common membership of the Council of Europe, the International Criminal Court, the OSCE, the United Nations, and the World Trade Organization. Bilaterally the two countries have a Development Partnership, and a Strategic Partnership, Trade and Cooperation Agreement.

== Economic relations ==
From 1 September 2014 until 30 December 2020, trade between Moldova and the UK was governed by the Moldova–European Union Association Agreement which includes the European Union–Moldova Deep and Comprehensive Free Trade Area, while the United Kingdom was a member of the European Union.

Following the withdrawal of the United Kingdom from the European Union, the Moldova and the UK signed the Moldova–United Kingdom Strategic Partnership, Trade and Cooperation Agreement on 24 December 2020. The Strategic Partnership, Trade and Cooperation Agreement is a continuity trade agreement, based on the EU free trade agreement, which entered into force on 1 January 2021. Trade value between Moldova and the United Kingdom was worth £1,480 million in 2022.

== Diplomatic missions ==
- Moldova maintains an embassy in London.
- The United Kingdom is accredited to Moldova through its embassy in Chişinău.
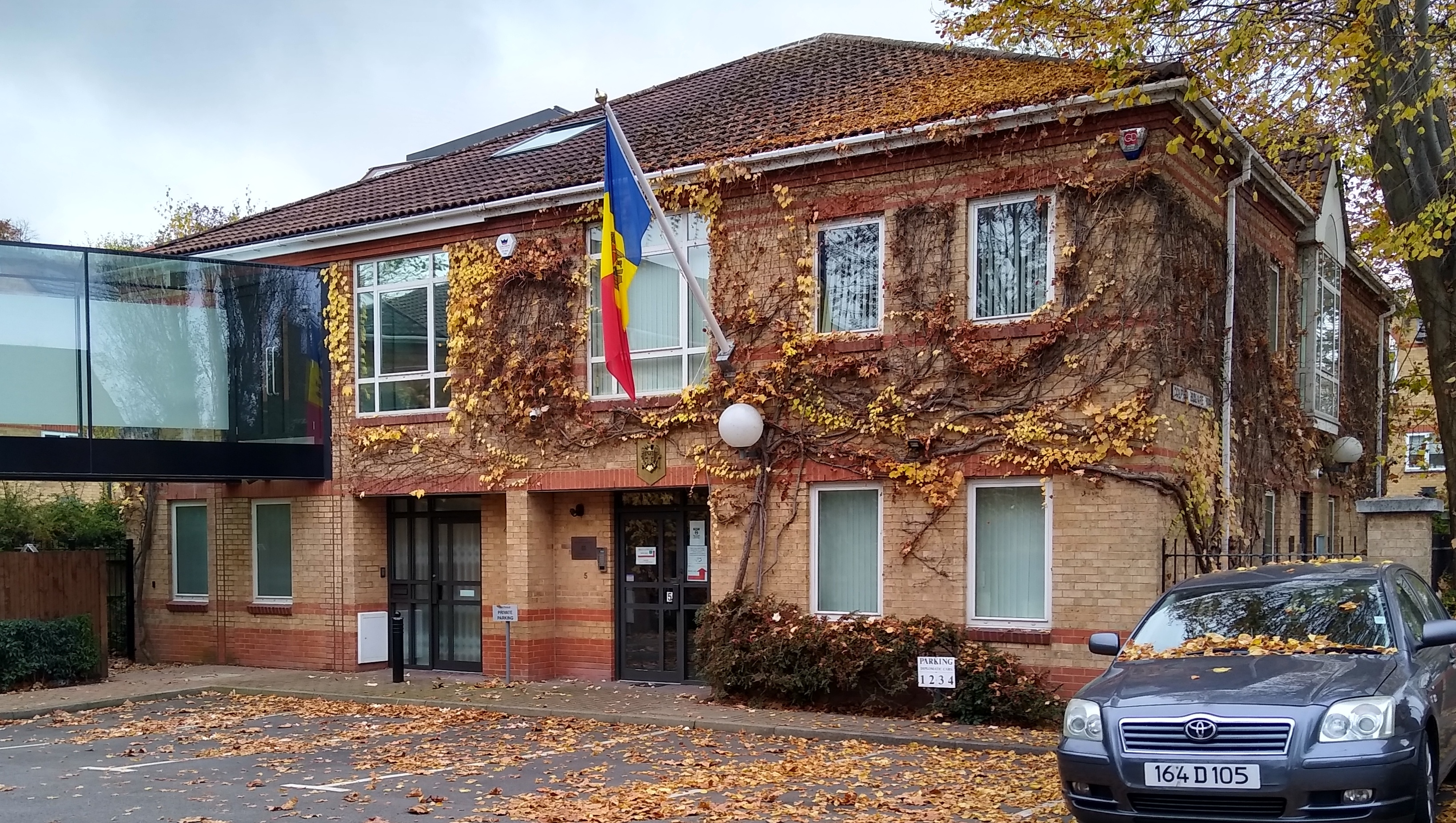
Embassy of Moldova in London

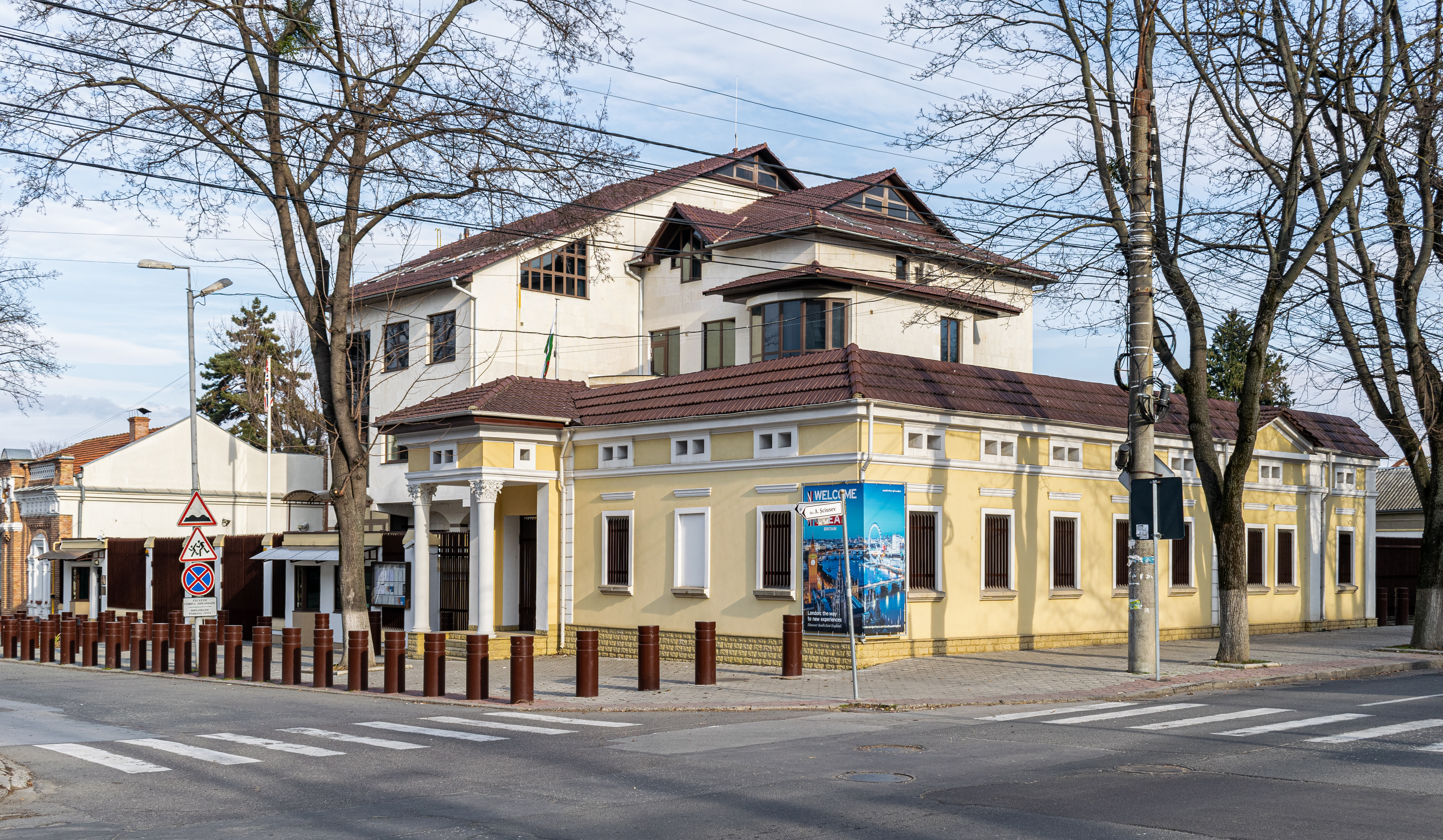
Embassy of the United Kingdom in Chișinău

== See also ==
- Foreign relations of Moldova
- Foreign relations of the United Kingdom
- Moldova-NATO relations
