= Maldives–United Kingdom relations =

- Maldives: United Kingdom

Diplomatic mission
- High Commission of the Maldives, London: High Commission of the United Kingdom, Male

Envoy
- High Commissioner Ahmed Shiaan: High Commissioner Nick Low

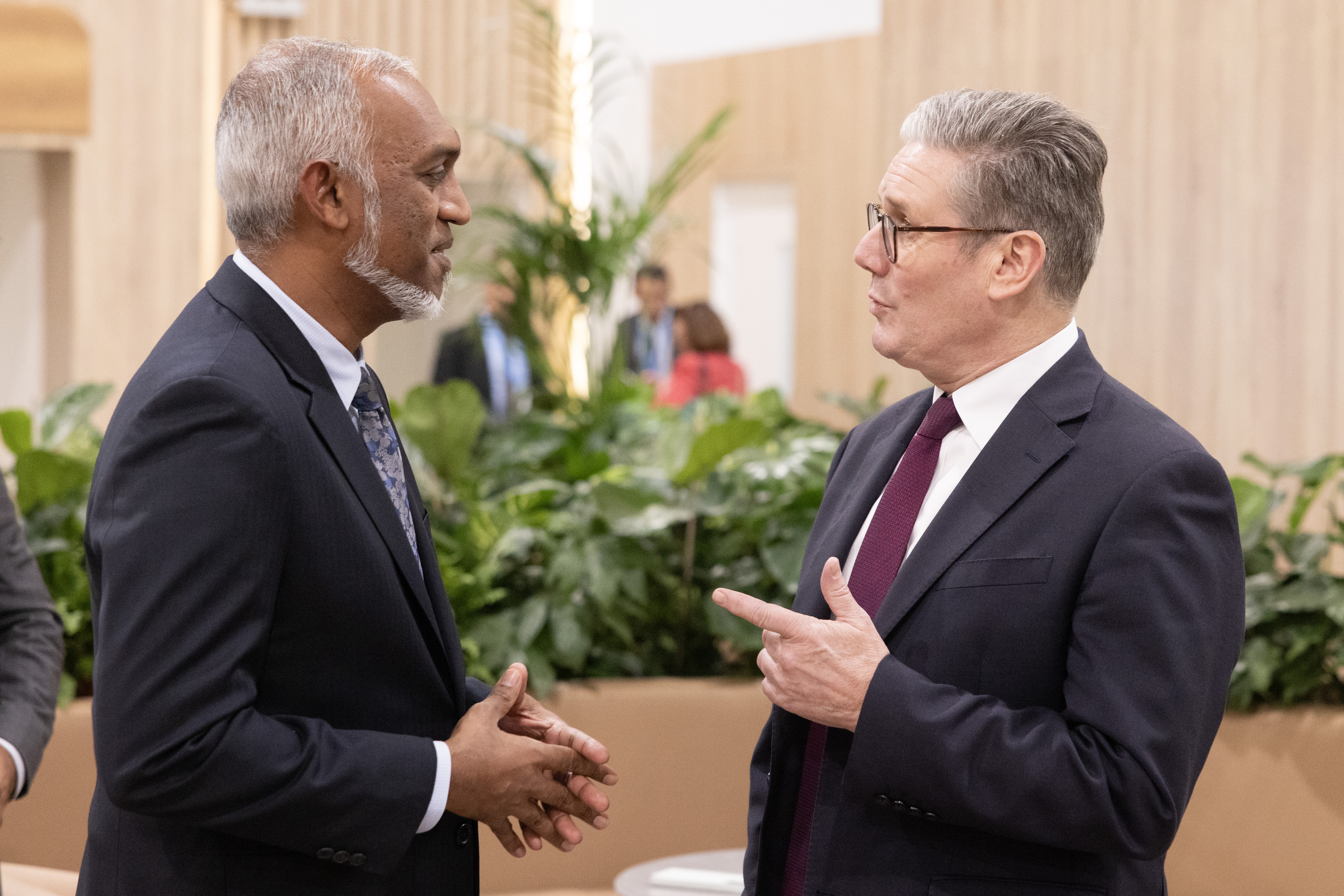
Maldivian President Mohamed Muizzu with British Prime Minister Keir Starmer at COP29 in Baku, November 2024.

The Maldives–United Kingdom relations encompass the diplomatic, economic, and historical interactions between the Republic of Maldives and the United Kingdom of Great Britain and Northern Ireland. Upon the Maldives' independence, the two countries established diplomatic relations on 26 July 1965.

Both countries share common membership of the Commonwealth, the International Criminal Court, the United Nations, and the World Trade Organization. Both countries are currently negotiating a Free Trade Agreement.

== History ==
The Maldives were a protectorate of the United Kingdom from 1887 until 1968, three years after it became independent.

The maritime border with the British Indian Ocean Territory (BIOT) remains undemarcated, with negotiations with the U.K. being broken off by the Maldives in the late 1990s.

== Economic relations ==
The Maldives and the United Kingdom have opened prelimary discussion for a free trade agreement.

== Resident diplomatic missions ==
- The Maldives maintains a high commission in London.
- The United Kingdom is accredited to the Maldives through its high commission in Malé.

== See also ==
- British protectorate
- Free trade agreements of the United Kingdom
- Foreign relations of the Maldives
- Foreign relations of the United Kingdom
- History of the Maldives
