= Tunisia–United Kingdom relations =

- Tunisia: United Kingdom

Diplomatic mission
- Embassy of Tunisia, London: Embassy of the United Kingdom, Tunis

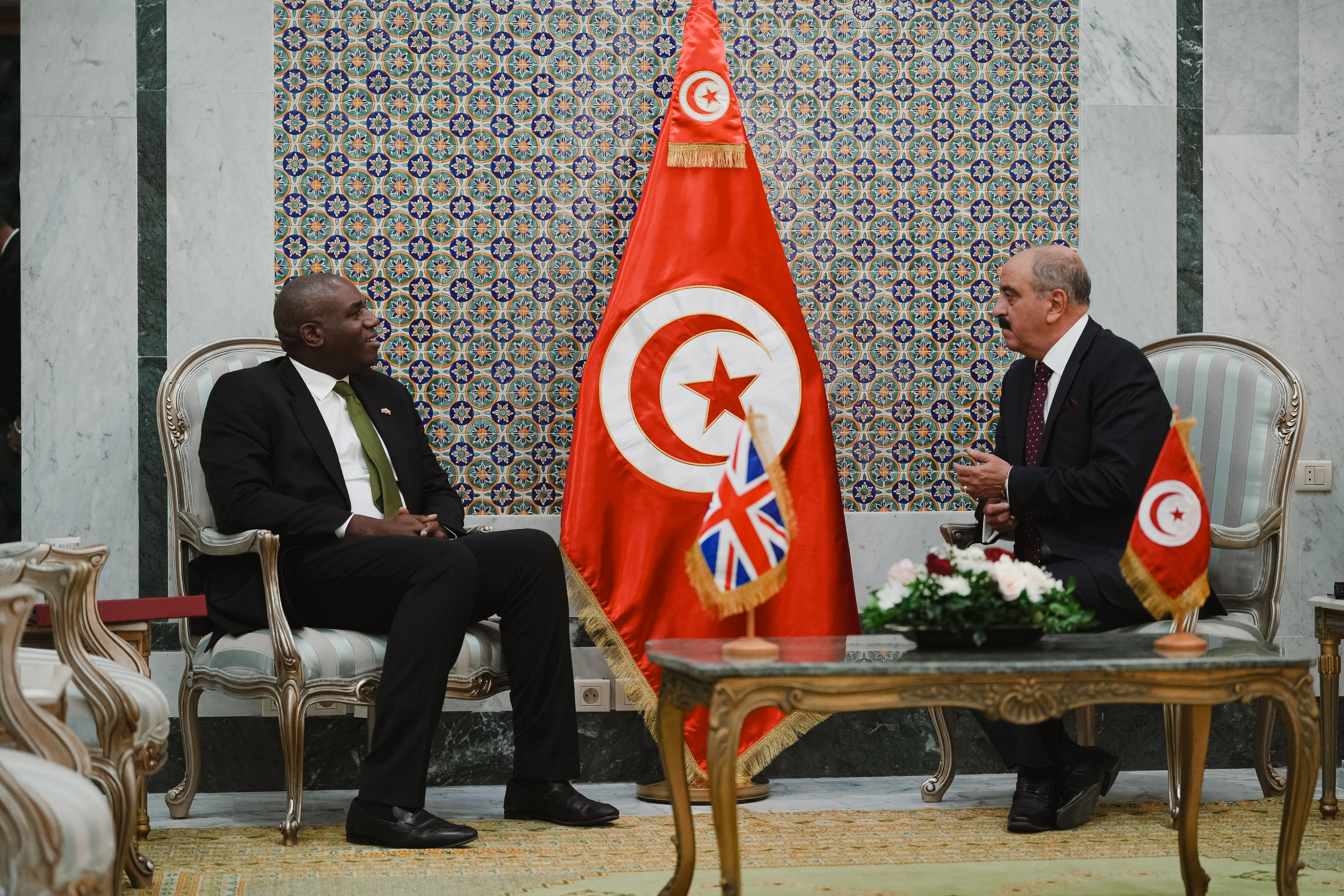
British Foreign Secretary David Lammy with Tunisian Foreign Minister Mohamed Ali Nafti in Tunis, January 2025.

Tunisia–United Kingdom relations are the foreign and bilateral relations between the Republic of Tunisia and the United Kingdom of Great Britain and Northern Ireland.

Both countries share common membership of the International Criminal Court, the United Nations, the World Health Organization, and the World Trade Organization. Bilaterally the two countries have an Association Agreement, a Double Taxation Convention, and an Investment Agreement.

== Economic relations ==
Tunisia–United Kingdom Association Agreement
Association Agreement between the United Kingdom of Great Britain and Northern Ireland, of the one part, and the Republic of Tunisia, of the other part
- Type: Free trade agreement
- Context: Trade continuity agreement between Tunisia and the United Kingdom
- Signed: 4 October 2019
- Location: London, England, United Kingdom
- Effective: 1 January 2021
- Negotiators: Nabil Ben Khedher; Louise de Sousa
- Parties: Tunisia; United Kingdom
- Language: Arabic; English; French

The Association Agreement between the United Kingdom and Tunisia was signed on 4 October 2020 in London. The Tunisia–United Kingdom Association Agreement was established to safeguard and enhance trade relations between the UK and Tunisia following the UK's withdrawal from the European Union. Both governments were directly represented at its signing. The agreement is bilingual, with English and French texts holding equal validity and authority. It ensures tariff-free trade on goods, promotes cooperation on regulations and standards, and preserves vital economic ties between the two parties. The use of both languages in its administration supports clarity and effective implementation. This accord guarantees continuity and stability in trade, bringing mutual economic benefits to both the UK and Tunisia.

From 1 March 1998 until 30 December 2020, trade between Tunisia and the UK was governed by the European Communities–Tunisia Euro-Mediterranean Association Agreement, while the United Kingdom was a member of the European Union.

Following the withdrawal of the United Kingdom from the European Union, the UK and Tunisia signed the Tunisia–United Kingdom Association Agreement on 15 October 2020. The Tunisia–United Kingdom Association Agreement is a continuity trade agreement, based on the EU free trade agreement, which entered into force on 1 January 2021. Trade value between Tunisia and the United Kingdom was worth £678 million in 2022.

== Diplomatic missions ==
- Tunisia maintains an embassy in London.
- The United Kingdom maintains an embassy in Tunis.

== See also ==
- 2015 Sousse attacks
- Foreign relations of Tunisia
- Foreign relations of the United Kingdom
- Free trade agreements of the United Kingdom
