= European Union–Singapore Free Trade Agreement =

- Location of Singapore and of the European Union
- Type: Trade agreement
- Signed: 19 October 2018
- Location: Brussels, Belgium
- Effective: 21 November 2019
- Condition: Ratification by all signatories
- Signatories: Singapore; European Union; All 27 EU member states
- Ratifiers: 2 (Singapore and the European Union)
- Languages: All 24 official EU languages except Irish: Bulgarian; Croatian; Czech; Danish; Dutch; English; Estonian; Finnish; French; German; Greek; Hungarian; Italian; Latvian; Lithuanian; Maltese; Polish; Portuguese; Romanian; Slovak; Slovene; Spanish; Swedish

The EU-Singapore Free Trade Agreement, acronym EUSFTA, is a signed and ratified free trade and bilateral investment treaty between the European Union and Singapore. The negotiations began in March 2010 and the first text was presented in September 2013. The negotiations on goods and services were completed in 2012, while talks on investment protection were concluded in October 2014.

The agreement was the first free trade agreement of the European Union with a member of the Association of Southeast Asian Nations and the third agreement with an Asian country after South Korea and Japan. Singapore is the EU's 14th largest trading partner.

On October 19, 2018, three agreements were signed between the parties, the EU-Singapore Trade Agreement, the EU-Singapore Investment Protection Agreement and the Framework Agreement on Partnership and Cooperation. The agreement was subsequently approved by the European Parliament on February 13, 2019. On November 8, 2019, it was announced the agreement will come into force from November 21, 2019. This comes after the Council of the European Union approved the agreement.

== Content of the Agreement ==
The EUSFTA covers the following key areas:

- Elimination of import duties and taxes
- Improved market access for trade in services
- More government procurement opportunities
- Strengthened cooperation in customs and trade facilitation matters
- Removal of technical and non-tariff barriers to trade
- Cooperation in the implementation of sanitary and phytosanitary measures
- Enhanced protection of intellectual property rights
- Robust disciplines on competition policy
- Renewed commitment to sustainable development

== Ratification ==
According to an opinion of the Court of Justice of the European Union (ECJ) in Luxembourg, the initial EUSFTA was a so-called mixed agreement. The opinion was requested by the European Commission, which wanted to confirm whether the EU institutions alone were entitled to conclude the agreement, without the individual member states being parties. The ECJ opinion prompted the European Commission to split the agreement into a free trade agreement and an investment protection agreement.

In order for the free trade agreement to come into force, both the EU (the Parliament and Council) and Singapore have to ratify the agreement. On February 13, 2019, the European Parliament approved both the free trade agreement and investment protection agreement and the FTA is expected to come into force as soon as possible.

The separate investment protection agreement will also need to be approved individually by each EU member state.

== See also ==
- Free trade agreements of the European Union
- Free trade agreements of the United Kingdom
- Singapore–European Union relations
- Singapore–United Kingdom Free Trade Agreement
