= Strategic Trade Advisory Group =

The Strategic Trade Advisory Group (STAG) is an executive agency that advises UK Department for International Trade on the view of stakeholders and devolved parliaments by providing evidence, relevant experience and expertise

== Role, Chair & Structure ==
Role

The Strategic Advisory Group works with stakeholders to help to shape the United Kingdom's trade policy, and helps to provide opportunities across all nations and regions of the UK through internal discussion.

Chair and structure

The Strategic Trade Advisory group is chaired by the Minister of State for Trade (DIT), and has meetings quarterly.

== Membership ==
STAG is composed of 16 core members selected by the Government, with membership of this group reviewed annually. Neither the democratically representative devolved administrations of Scotland, Wales, Northern Ireland and London, nor the city regions in England, have any representation, ex officio or otherwise.

Name of Represent	Organisation	Position / Area of Representation
Minister for Trade Policy	DIT	Chair
Holger Breinlich	University of Surrey	Academia
Carolyn Fairbairn	Confederation of British Industry	Business Representative Organisation)
Scott Steedman	British Standards Institution	Standards
Caroline Normand	Which?	Consumer
Dirk Willem te Velde	Overseas Development Institute	Developmental
Mark Abrams	Trade Finance Global	New Entrant
Michael Gidney	Fair Trade Foundation	Non-governmental organizations
Nick Coburn	Ulster Carpets	Northern Ireland Business
Denise Valin Alvarez	Burberry	Regional Business
Liz Cameron	Scottish Chamber of Commerce	Scottish Business
Sean Ramsden	Ramsden International	Small And Medium Enterprise
Mike Cherry	Federation of Small Business,	Small And Medium Enterprise, Business Representative Organisation
Sam Lowe	Centre for European Reform	Think Tanks
Paul Nowak	Trade Union Congress	Trade Unions
Prys Morgan	Kepak Group Limited	Welsh Business

Government officials are also invited to attend, and depending on the topic of discussion the appropriate minister received the invitation to attend.
