= Free trade agreements of the United Kingdom =

UK free trade agreements

Free trade areas of the United Kingdom (as of 15 July 2026) United Kingdom Active free trade areas Signed free trade agreements

Following its withdrawal from the European Union on 31 January 2020, the United Kingdom began negotiations on several free trade agreements to remove or reduce tariff and non-tariff barriers to trade, both to establish new agreements and to replace previous EU trade agreements. Withdrawal ended 47 years of membership during which all its trading agreements were negotiated by the European Commission on behalf of the bloc. The UK did not actually withdraw from the European Single Market and the European Union Customs Union (and its trade agreements) until 31 December 2020.

These treaties are divided into two types of free trade agreements: continuity agreements and 'new' agreements. Continuity agreements, also named rollover agreements, make use of a mutatis mutandis concept in order to quickly replicate the existing EU agreements, only having to call out those minor areas of differentiation. Most continuity treaties were provisionally applied, or through a "bridging mechanism", thus continuity was achieved. Trade agreements negotiated after Brexit are termed 'new', or enhanced agreements: these agreements have been negotiated from scratch or have been renegotiated to expand the deal since Brexit.

As of July 2026, the United Kingdom has 40 active free trade agreements with nations and trade blocs, covering 103 countries and territories. Six of these are 'new' trade agreements, such as with Australia, India, and New Zealand. The UK is also a member of the Comprehensive and Progressive Agreement for Trans-Pacific Partnership.

== Competence and ratification ==
According to UK law the United Kingdom Parliament has the power to pass law in all policy areas.

The UK's negotiating team will consult with its Strategic Trade Advisory Group throughout the negotiations.

=== Ratification ===
The responsibility for concluding treaties involving the UK lies with the Secretary of State for Foreign, Commonwealth and Development Affairs. This remains the case even when the negotiation of the treaty is led by another government department.

The Foreign & Commonwealth Office's legal advisers and Treaty Section:

- must be given the opportunity to comment on the drafts of all treaties under negotiation
- will advise on the form and substance of the treaty, though not substance which is technical and of which the other government department is the expert
- will advise on related matters such as the production of Full Powers and Instruments of Ratification
- will produce original signature copies of treaties and advise on the treaty signing ceremony
- will arrange for the treaty to be published and laid before Parliament
- is responsible for the registration of these treaties with the United Nations, allowing their subsequent publication in the United Nations Treaty Series
- will transfer of the treaties to the National Archives for preservation

Unless expressly authorised to do so by the United Kingdom government, Crown Dependencies and Overseas Territories do not have the authority to contract treaties in their own right. The UK must extend the territorial scope of its ratification of treaties to include them. This may be done either at the time of ratification, or at some later date.

== Active agreements ==
The following free trade agreements are currently in effect. The following lists include three types of regional trade agreements as classified by the World Trade Organization, including free trade agreements (FTA), economic integration agreements (EIA), and customs unions (CU). Signature and entry into force dates are as listed by the World Trade Organization.

=== Independent agreements ===
The following bilateral and plurilateral free trade agreements are currently active independently from a trade bloc:

Nation(s)	No. of nations represented	Agreement	Signed	Effective	Coverage	Type	WTO	Mechanism	Trade value (2025)	Ref.
Albania	1	Albania–UK Partnership, Trade and Cooperation Agreement	5 February 2021	3 May 2021	Goods & services	Continuity	FTA & EIA	Full ratification	£373m	
Andean Countries; Colombia; Ecuador; Peru	3	Andean Countries–UK Trade Agreement	15 May 2019	1 January 2021 (Note: Trade with Colombia entered into force on 28 June 2022.)	Goods & services	Continuity	FTA & EIA	Full ratification	£4,288m	
Australia	1	Australia–UK Free Trade Agreement	16 December 2021	31 May 2023	Goods & services	New	FTA & EIA	Full ratification	£24,186m	
Cameroon	1	Cameroon–UK Economic Partnership Agreement	28 December 2020	1 January 2021	Goods	Continuity	FTA	Full ratification	£321m	
Canada	1	Canada–UK Trade Continuity Agreement	22 December 2020	1 January 2021	Goods & services (Note: The agreement only covered goods until 1 April 2021, when it expanded to cover services.)	Continuity	FTA & EIA	Full ratification	£33,655m	
CARIFORUM; Antigua and Barbuda; The Bahamas; Barbados; Belize; Dominica; Dominican Republic; Grenada; Guyana; Jamaica; Saint Kitts and Nevis; Saint Lucia; Saint Vincent and the Grenadines; Suriname; Trinidad and Tobago	14	CARIFORUM–UK Economic Partnership Agreement	22 March 2019 (Note: Trinidad and Tobago signed on 1 April 2019. Dominican Republic signed on 4 April 2019. Antigua and Barbuda signed on 6 June 2019. The Bahamas signed on 27 November 2019. Suriname signed on 4 March 2021.)	1 January 2021 (Note: Trade with Suriname entered into force on 5 March 2021.)	Goods & services	Continuity	FTA & EIA	Provisional application	£5,522m	
Central America; Costa Rica; El Salvador; Guatemala; Honduras; Nicaragua; Panama	6	Central America–UK Association Agreement	18 July 2019	1 January 2021	Goods & services	Continuity	FTA & EIA	Full ratification	£2,939m	
Chile	1	Chile–UK Association Agreement	30 January 2019	1 January 2021	Goods & services	Continuity	FTA & EIA	Full ratification	£2,282m	
Eastern and Southern Africa; Madagascar; Mauritius; Seychelles; Zimbabwe	4	Eastern and Southern Africa–UK Economic Partnership Agreement	31 January 2019 (Note: Madagascar signed the agreement on 4 November 2021.)	1 January 2021 (Note: Trade with Madagascar entered into force on 1 August 2024.)	Goods	Continuity	FTA	Full ratification	£2,562m	
Egypt	1	Egypt–UK Association Agreement	5 December 2020	1 January 2021	Goods	Continuity	FTA	Full ratification	£5,058m	
European Union 27 members: Akrotiri and Dhekelia (Note: As an integral part of the EU Customs Union, Akrotiri and Dhekelia-UK trade is covered by this agreement.); Andorra (Note: Under the UK-EU Trade and Cooperation Agreement, the UK and the EU have agreed that Andorra be treated as a member of the EUCU. Therefore, Andorra-UK trade is covered by this agreement.); Austria; Belgium; Bulgaria; Croatia; Cyprus; Czech Republic; Denmark; Estonia; Finland; France; Germany; Greece; Hungary; Ireland; Italy; Latvia; Lithuania; Luxembourg; Malta; Monaco (Note: As an integral part of the EU Customs Union, Monaco-UK trade is covered by this agreement.); Netherlands; Poland; Portugal; Romania; San Marino (Note: Under the UK-EU Trade and Cooperation Agreement, the UK and the EU have agreed that San Marino be treated as a member of the EUCU. Therefore, San Marino-UK trade is covered by this agreement.); Slovakia; Slovenia; Spain; Sweden	31 (Note: This agreement covers the 27 EU members, additionally it governs UK trade with Andorra, Monaco, San Marino, as well as the British Overseas Territory of Akrotiri and Dhekelia.)	EU–UK Trade and Cooperation Agreement	30 December 2020	1 January 2021	Goods & services	New	FTA & EIA	Full ratification	£865,900m	
Faroe Islands	1	Faroe Islands–UK Free Trade Agreement	31 January 2019	1 January 2021	Goods	Continuity	FTA	Full ratification	£267m	
Georgia	1	Georgia–UK Strategic Partnership and Cooperation Agreement	21 October 2019	1 January 2021	Goods & services	Continuity	FTA & EIA	Full ratification	£424m	
Ghana	1	Ghana–UK Interim Trade Partnership Agreement	2 March 2021	5 March 2021	Goods	Continuity	FTA	Provisional application	£1,561m	
Iceland; Liechtenstein; Norway	3	Iceland–Liechtenstein–Norway–UK Free Trade Agreement	8 July 2021	1 December 2021	Goods & services (Note: Due to the Swiss-Liechtenstein customs union, goods from Liechtenstein are governed in the Switzerland–Liechtenstein–UK FTA.)	New	FTA & EIA	Full ratification	£41,125	
India	1	India–UK Comprehensive Economic and Trade Agreement	24 July 2025	15 July 2026	Goods & services	New	FTA & EIA	Full ratification	£48,029m	
Israel	1	Israel–UK Trade and Partnership Agreement	18 February 2019	1 January 2021	Goods	Continuity	FTA	Full ratification	£5,956m	
Ivory Coast	1	Ivory Coast–UK Stepping Stone Economic Partnership Agreement	15 October 2020	1 January 2021	Goods	Continuity	FTA	Full ratification	£1,116m	
Japan	1	Japan–UK Comprehensive Economic Partnership Agreement	23 October 2020	1 January 2021	Goods & services	New	FTA & EIA	Full ratification	£34,660m	
Jordan	1	Jordan–UK Association Agreement	5 November 2019	1 May 2021	Goods	Continuity	FTA	Full ratification	£1,099m	
Kenya	1	Kenya–UK Economic Partnership Agreement	8 December 2020	1 January 2021	Goods	Continuity	FTA	Full ratification	£2,117m	
Kosovo	1	Kosovo–UK Partnership, Trade and Cooperation Agreement	3 December 2019	1 January 2021	Goods & services	Continuity	FTA & EIA	Full ratification	£20m	
Lebanon	1	Lebanon–UK Association Agreement	19 September 2019	1 January 2021	Goods	Continuity	FTA	Full ratification	£696m	
Liechtenstein; Switzerland	2	Switzerland–Liechtenstein–UK Trade Agreement	11 February 2019	1 January 2021	Goods (Note: This treaty only governs Liechtenstein's goods due to the Swiss-Liechtenstein customs union. Liechtenstein–UK trade is governed by the Iceland–Liechtenstein–Norway–UK FTA.)	Continuity	FTA	Full ratification	£52,919m	
Mexico	1	Mexico–UK Trade Continuity Agreement	15 December 2020	1 June 2021	Goods & services	Continuity	FTA & EIA	Full ratification	£7,010m	
Moldova	1	Moldova–UK Strategic Partnership, Trade and Cooperation Agreement	24 December 2020	1 January 2021	Goods & services	Continuity	FTA & EIA	Full ratification	£1,568m	
Morocco	1	Morocco–UK Association Agreement	26 October 2019	1 January 2021	Goods	Continuity	FTA	Provisional application	£4,740m	
New Zealand	1	New Zealand–UK Free Trade Agreement	28 February 2022	31 May 2023	Goods & services	New	FTA & EIA	Full ratification	£4,019m	
North Macedonia	1	North Macedonia–UK Partnership, Trade and Cooperation Agreement	3 December 2020	1 January 2021	Goods & services	Continuity	FTA & EIA	Provisional application	£1,773m	
Pacific States; Fiji; Papua New Guinea; Samoa; Solomon Islands	4	Pacific States–UK Economic Partnership Agreement	14 March 2019 (Note: Samoa signed the agreement on 11 January 2021 The Solomon Islands signed the agreement on 5 January 2021)	1 January 2021 (Note: Trade with Samoa and the Solomon Islands entered into force on 31 March 2022.)	Goods	Continuity	FTA	Provisional application	£653m	
Palestinian Authority	1	Palestinian Authority–UK Political, Trade and Partnership Agreement	18 February 2019	1 January 2021	Goods	Continuity	FTA	Full ratification	£38m	
Serbia	1	Serbia–UK Partnership, Trade and Cooperation Agreement	16 April 2021	20 May 2021	Goods & services	Continuity	FTA & EIA	Full ratification	£1,247m	
Singapore	1	Singapore–UK Free Trade Agreement	10 December 2020	1 January 2021	Goods & services	Continuity (Note: Expanded upon by the Singapore–UK Digital Economy Agreement to cover digital trade, after entering into force on 14 June 2022.)	FTA & EIA	Full ratification	£28,244m	
South Korea	1	South Korea–UK Trade Agreement	22 August 2019	1 January 2021	Goods & services	Continuity	FTA & EIA	Full ratification	£16,975m	
Southern Africa Customs Union and Mozambique; Botswana; Eswatini; Lesotho; Mozambique; Namibia; South Africa	6	SACUM–UK Economic Partnership Agreement	9 October 2019 (Note: South Africa signed the agreement on 16 October 2019.)	1 January 2021	Goods	Continuity	FTA	Full ratification	£14,296m	
Tunisia	1	Tunisia–UK Association Agreement	4 October 2019	1 January 2021	Goods	Continuity	FTA & EIA	Full ratification	£716m	
Turkey	1	Turkey–UK Trade Agreement	29 December 2020	1 January 2021	Goods	Continuity	FTA	Provisional application	£28,323m	
Ukraine	1	Ukraine–UK Political, Free Trade and Strategic Partnership Agreement	8 October 2020	1 January 2021	Goods & services	Continuity (Note: Expanded upon by the Ukraine–UK Digital Trade Agreement to cover digital trade, after entering into force on 1 September 2024.)	FTA & EIA	Full ratification	£2,058m	
Vietnam	1	UK–Vietnam Free Trade Agreement	29 December 2020	1 January 2021	Goods & services	Continuity	FTA & EIA	Provisional application	£10,473m	

=== Trade bloc membership ===
CPTPP signatories United Kingdom Crown Dependencies and Overseas Territories

The United Kingdom is currently a member of one trade bloc, which covers multilateral free trade with fellow members.

Trade bloc	No. of nations represented	Signed	Effective	Coverage	WTO	Trade value	Ref.
Comprehensive and Progressive Agreement for Trans-Pacific Partnership; Australia; Brunei; Canada; Chile; Japan; Malaysia; Mexico; New Zealand; Peru; Singapore; Vietnam	11	16 July 2023	15 December 2024 (Note: Trade with Australia entered into force on 24 December 2024. Trade with Mexico entered into force on 22 June 2026. Trade with Canada entered into force on 1 September 2026.)	Goods & services	FTA & EIA	£152,415m (Note: This figure only accounts for UK trade with 8 CPTPP member states, excluding Canada due to late ratification of the treaty.)	

== Negotiations ==
The United Kingdom is currently pursuing free trade agreements with new countries using three methods. The first of is negotiating completely new trade agreements with a country. The second is through a country applying and acceding to a trade bloc of which the United Kingdom is currently a member. The third way is through encouraging countries to join existing plurilateral trade agreements.

=== Active negotiations ===
The following countries are in active negotiations, have drafted, or signed a new free trade agreement with the UK government:

Nation (s)	No of nations represented	Agreement	Coverage	Type	Trade value (2023)	Status	Progress	Ref.
Greenland	1	Greenland–UK Partnership, Trade and Cooperation Agreement	Goods	New	£12m	Negotiations ongoing	Negotiations resumed on 3 October 2025.	
Gulf Cooperation Council; Bahrain; Kuwait; Oman; Qatar; Saudi Arabia; United Arab Emirates	6	Gulf Cooperation Council–UK Free Trade Agreement	Goods & services	New	£57,433m	Agreement signed	Agreement signed on 20 May 2026	
South Korea	1	South Korea–UK Free Trade Agreement	Goods & services	New	£18,349m	Negotiations concluded	Agreement in principle reached on 15 December 2025.	
Switzerland	1	Switzerland–UK Free Trade Agreement	Goods & services	New	£50,817m	Negotiations concluded	Agreement in principle reached on 13 July 2026.	
Turkey	1	Turkey–UK Free Trade Agreement	Goods & services	New	£25,817m	Negotiations ongoing	Sixth round of negotiations concluded on 2 October 2026.	

=== Previous negotiations ===
The following countries have previously opened negotiations with the UK government for a free trade agreement, but negotiations have since been suspended, stagnated, or removed from the UK governments trade negotiations agenda. The United Kingdom has formally suspended negotiations for a free trade agreement on two occasions; it suspended free trade negotiations with Canada in January 2024, and Israel in May 2025.

Nation (s)	No of nations represented	Agreement	Coverage	Type	Trade value (2023)	Status	Progress	Ref.
Algeria	1	Algeria–UK Association Agreement	Goods	Continuity	£2,303m	Negotiations stagnated	A continuity trade agreement has been offered to Algeria; neither party has signed the agreement.	
Bosnia and Herzegovina	1	Bosnia and Herzegovina–UK Partnership, Trade and Cooperation Agreement	Goods & services	Continuity	£255m	Negotiations stagnated	A continuity trade agreement has been offered to Bosnia and Herzegovina; neither party has signed the agreement.	
Canada	1	Canada–UK Free Trade Agreement	Goods & services	New	£26,287m	Negotiations suspended	Negotiations suspended on 25 January 2024 by the United Kingdom; the two sides have completed eight rounds of talks since 2022.	
Israel	1	Israel–UK Free Trade Agreement	Goods & services	New	£6,137m	Negotiations suspended	Negotiations suspended on 20 May 2025 by the United Kingdom; the two sides have completed five rounds of talks since 2022.	
Mexico	1	Mexico–UK Free Trade Agreement	Goods & services	New	£6,599m	Negotiations stagnated	Third round of negotiations concluded on 19 May 2023.	
Montenegro	1	Montenegro–UK Partnership, Trade and Cooperation Agreement	Goods & services	Continuity	£156m	Negotiations stagnated	A continuity trade agreement has been offered to Montenegro; neither party has signed the agreement.	
United States	1	UK–United States Free Trade Agreement	Goods & services	New	£310,840m	Negotiations stagnated	Fifth round of negotiations concluded on 30 October 2020.	

=== Preliminary discussions ===
The following countries have reportedly discussed negotiating a free trade agreement with the United Kingdom, however negotiations have not been formally opened.

Nation (s)	No of nations represented	Agreement	Coverage	Type	Trade value (2023)	Status	Progress	Ref.
Maldives	1	Maldives–UK Free Trade Agreement	Goods	New	£492m	Discussions stagnated	Trade consultation closed on 2 August 2023.	
Mercosur; Argentina; Bolivia; Brazil; Paraguay; Uruguay	1	Mercosur–UK Free Trade Agreement	Goods & services	New	£15,175m	Discussions ongoing	Preliminary discussions to open FTA negotiations restarted on 11 November 2025.	
Thailand	1	Thailand–UK Free Trade Agreement	Goods & services	New	£6,026m	Discussions ongoing	Preliminary discussions to open FTA negotiations ongoing.	

=== Trade bloc applicants ===
The following countries have applied to join the Comprehensive and Progressive Agreement for Trans-Pacific Partnership, a trade bloc of which the United Kingdom is a member.

Country	Application	Negotiations opened	Negotiations concluded	Status	Bilateral trade value (2023)	Existing FTA	Ref.
Argentina	3 June 2026	pending	pending	Formal application submitted	£1,982m	none	
Cambodia	16 December 2025	pending	pending	Formal application submitted	£216m	none	
China	16 September 2021	pending	pending	Formal application submitted	£90,243m	none	
Costa Rica	11 August 2022	29 November 2024	7 May 2026	Negotiations concluded	£1,143m	Central America–UK Association Agreement	
Ecuador	29 December 2021	pending	pending	Formal application submitted	£475m	Andean Countries–United Kingdom Trade Agreement	
Indonesia	19 September 2024	26 June 2026	pending	Formal application submitted	£2,999m	none	
Philippines	August 2025	26 June 2026	pending	Formal application submitted	£2,439m	none	
Taiwan	22 September 2021	pending	pending	Formal application submitted	£7,433m	none	
Ukraine	5 May 2023	pending	pending	Formal application submitted	£1,523m	Ukraine–UK Political, Free Trade and Strategic Partnership Agreement	
United Arab Emirates	August 2025	26 June 2026	pending	Formal application submitted	£24,161m	none	
Uruguay	1 December 2022	21 November 2025	pending	Negotiations ongoing	£409m	none	

=== EPA enlargement ===
The following countries can accede to an existing plurilateral Economic Partnership Agreement with the United Kingdom.

Nation(s)	Trade agreement being joined	Status	Ref.
Haiti	CARIFORUM–United Kingdom Economic Partnership Agreement	Haiti will be covered by the CARIFORUM–United Kingdom Economic Partnership Agreement if they sign it and bring it into effect.	
Comoros; Zambia	Eastern and Southern Africa–United Kingdom Economic Partnership Agreement	Out of the remaining COMESA members, Comoros, and Zambia have agreements in place allowing them to join the ESA–UK Economic Partnership Agreement: Comoros signed the agreement on 12 April 2022 and will be covered by the EPA when they bring it into effect.; Zambia will be covered by the EPA if they sign it and bring it into effect.	
East African Community; Burundi; DR Congo; Rwanda; Somalia; South Sudan; Tanzania; Uganda	Kenya–United Kingdom Economic Partnership Agreement	Article 143 of the UK–Kenya Economic Partnership Agreement enables any other East African Community member to make an accession request to the UK–Kenya EPA Council.	
Cook Islands; Kiribati; Marshall Islands; Federated States of Micronesia; Nauru; Niue; Palau; Tonga; Tuvalu; Vanuatu	Pacific States–United Kingdom Economic Partnership Agreement	The Pacific States–United Kingdom Economic Partnership Agreement states that 10 other Pacific nations are currently eligible to apply for accession.: Tonga has shown interest in acceding to the EPA.	

== Obsolete agreements ==
The following free trade agreements were previously active, however they have since been superseded or terminated. Signature, entry into force and obsolete dates are as listed by the World Trade Organization.

=== Former independent agreements ===
The following bilateral and plurilateral free trade agreements were previously active independently from a trade bloc:

Nation(s)	No of nations represented	Agreement	Signed	Effective	Obsolete	Coverage	WTO	Information	Superseded by	Ref.
Ireland	1	Ireland–United Kingdom Free Trade Area	19 December 1965	1 July 1966	1 January 1973	Goods	FTA	The Free Trade Area was agreed to after both nations' bids to join the European Economic Community were rejected. This agreement was superseded upon both parties' accession to the EEC.	European Economic Community	
Colombia	1	Colombia–UK Trade Continuity Agreement	18 October 2019	1 January 2021	28 June 2022	Goods & services	FTA & EIA	The Trade Continuity Agreement was a provisionally applied FTA. It existed following Brexit but prior to Colombia's ratification of the Andean Countries–UK Trade Agreement, which went on to supersede this agreement.	Andean Countries–United Kingdom Trade Agreement	
Iceland; Norway	2	Iceland–Norway–UK Trade Agreement	8 December 2020	1 January 2021	1 September 2022	Goods	FTA	The Iceland–Norway–UK Trade Agreement was a continuity trade agreement that plurilaterally covered both Iceland–UK trade as well as Norway–UK trade. The agreement was superseded by a new plurilateral FTA which expanded the coverage to include services, additionally covering Liechtenstein–UK trade.	Free Trade Agreement between Iceland, Liechtenstein, Norway, and the UK	

=== Former trade bloc memberships ===
The United Kingdom was previously a member of the following trade blocs, which covered multilateral free trade with fellow members.

Nation(s)	No. of nations represented	Signed	Effective	Obsolete	Coverage	WTO	Note	Superseded by	Ref.
European Free Trade Association; Austria; Denmark; Iceland; Norway; Portugal; Sweden; Switzerland	7	4 January 1960 (Note: Iceland signed the agreement on 4 December 1969.)	3 May 1960 (Note: Trade with Iceland entered into force on 1 March 1970. Trade with Liechtenstein entered into force on 1 September 1991.)	31 December 1972	Goods	FTA & EIA	The UK was a founding member of the European Free Trade Association, but left the organisation to join the European Economic Community, along with Denmark.	European Economic Community	
European Economic Community; Belgium; Denmark; France; Greece; Ireland; Italy; Luxembourg; Netherlands; Portugal; Spain; West Germany/Germany (Note: German reunification took place in 1990)	11	22 January 1972 (Note: Greece signed the agreement on 28 May 1979. Portugal and Spain signed the agreement on 12 June 1985.)	1 January 1973 (Note: Greece acceded to the European Economic Community on 1 January 1981. Portugal and Spain acceded to the European Economic Community on 1 January 1986.)	1 November 1993	Goods & services	CU	The UK joined the European Economic Community, along with Denmark and Ireland. The EEC was superseded by the European Union.	European Union	
European Union 27 members: Austria; Belgium; Bulgaria; Croatia; Cyprus; Czechia; Denmark; Estonia; Finland; France; Germany; Greece; Hungary; Ireland; Italy; Latvia; Lithuania; Luxembourg; Malta; Netherlands; Poland; Portugal; Romania; Slovakia; Slovenia; Spain; Sweden	27	7 February 1992 (Note: Austria, Finland, and Sweden signed the agreement on 24 June 1994. Cyprus, Czechia, Estonia, Hungary, Latvia, Lithuania, Malta, Poland, Slovakia, and Slovenia signed the agreement on 16 April 2003. Bulgaria and Romania signed the agreement on 25 April 2005. Croatia signed the agreement on 9 December 2011.)	1 November 1993 (Note: Austria, Finland, and Sweden acceded to the European Union on 1 January 1995. Cyprus, Czechia, Estonia, Hungary, Latvia, Lithuania, Malta, Poland, Slovakia, and Slovenia acceded to the European Union on 1 May 2004. Bulgaria and Romania acceded to the European Union on 1 January 2007. Croatia acceded to the European Union on 1 July 2013.)	1 January 2021	Goods & services	CU & EIA	Following the result of the Brexit referendum, the UK invoked Article 50 on 27 March 2017; the UK officially withdrew from the EU on the 1 January 2021. Trade between the EU and the UK was superseded by the Trade and Cooperation following the withdrawal of the UK from the EU.	Trade and Cooperation Agreement	
European Economic Area 30 members: Austria; Belgium; Bulgaria; Croatia; Cyprus; Czechia; Denmark; Estonia; Finland; France; Germany; Greece; Hungary; Iceland; Ireland; Italy; Latvia; Liechtenstein; Lithuania; Luxembourg; Malta; Netherlands; Norway; Poland; Portugal; Romania; Slovakia; Slovenia; Spain; Sweden	30	2 May 1992	1 January 1994	1 January 2021	Services	EIA	The UK and the European Union agreed that Services trade would be covered by the Trade and Cooperation Agreement.	Trade and Cooperation Agreement	

=== European Union agreements ===
The following agreements are European Economic Community/European Union free trade agreements with third nations of which the UK was a part during its membership of the European Union.

Nation (s)	No of nations represented	Agreement	Signed	Effective	Obsolete	Coverage	WTO	Note	Superseded by	Ref.
Turkey	1	European Economic Community–Turkey Additional Protocol	N/A	1 January 1973	1 January 1974	Goods	FTA	The agreement was superseded by an updated FTA with Turkey.	Association Agreement	
Portugal	1	European Economic Community–Portugal Agreement	22 July 1972	1 January 1973	1 January 1976	Goods	FTA	The agreement was superseded by an updated FTA with Portugal.	Interim Agreement	
Morocco	1	European Economic Community–Morocco Association Agreement	N/A	1 January 1973	1 July 1976	Goods	FTA	The agreement was superseded by an updated FTA with Morocco.	Interim Agreement	
Tunisia	1	European Economic Community–Tunisia Association Agreement	N/A	1 January 1973	1 July 1976	Goods	FTA	The agreement was superseded by an updated FTA with Tunisia.	Interim Agreement	
Egypt	1	Egypt–European Economic Community Agreement	N/A	1 November 1973	1 January 1977	Goods	FTA	The agreement was superseded by an updated FTA with Egypt.	Interim Agreement	
Lebanon	1	European Economic Community–Lebanon Agreement	N/A	1 November 1973	1 January 1977	Goods	FTA	The agreement was superseded by an updated FTA with Lebanon.	Interim Agreement	
Algeria	1	Algeria–European Economic Community Interim Agreement	26 April 1976	1 July 1976	1 November 1978	Goods	FTA	The agreement was superseded by an updated FTA with Algeria.	Cooperation Agreement	
Egypt	1	Egypt–European Economic Community Interim Agreement	18 January 1977	1 July 1977	1 November 1978	Goods	FTA	The agreement was superseded by an updated FTA with Egypt.	Cooperation Agreement	
Jordan	1	European Economic Community–Jordan Interim Agreement	18 January 1977	1 July 1977	1 November 1978	Goods	FTA	The agreement was superseded by an updated FTA with Jordan.	Cooperation Agreement	
Lebanon	1	European Economic Community–Lebanon Interim Agreement	3 May 1977	1 July 1977	1 November 1978	Goods	FTA	The agreement was superseded by an updated FTA with Lebanon.	Cooperation Agreement	
Morocco	1	European Economic Community–Morocco Interim Agreement	27 April 1976	1 July 1977	1 November 1978	Goods	FTA	The agreement was superseded by an updated FTA with Morocco.	Cooperation Agreement	
Syria	1	European Economic Community–Syria Interim Agreement	18 January 1977	1 July 1977	1 November 1978	Goods	FTA	The agreement was superseded by an updated FTA with Syria.	Cooperation Agreement	
Tunisia	1	European Economic Community–Tunisia Interim Agreement	25 April 1976	1 July 1977	1 November 1978	Goods	FTA	The agreement was superseded by an updated FTA with Tunisia.	Cooperation Agreement	
Greece	1	European Economic Community–Greece Association Agreement	N/A	1 January 1973	1 January 1981	Goods	CU	The agreement was terminated due to Greece's accession to the European Communities.	European Economic Community	
Greece	1	European Economic Community–Greece Additional Protocol	28 April 1975	1 July 1975	1 January 1981	Goods	FTA	The agreement was terminated due to Greece's accession to the European Communities.	European Economic Community	
Portugal	1	European Economic Community–Portugal Interim Agreement	20 September 1976	1 November 1976	1 January 1986	Goods	FTA	The agreement was terminated due to Portugal's accession to the European Communities.	European Economic Community	
Spain	1	European Economic Community–Spain Agreement	N/A	1 January 1973	1 January 1986	Goods	FTA	The agreement was terminated due to Spain's accession to the European Communities.	European Economic Community	
Yugoslavia	1	European Economic Community–Yugoslavia Interim Agreement	6 May 1980	1 July 1980	27 November 1991	Goods	FTA	The agreement was terminated by the EEC due to the breakup of Yugoslavia.	N/A	
Finland	1	European Economic Community–Finland Agreement	5 October 1973	1 January 1973	1 January 1994	Goods	FTA	The agreement was terminated due to Finland's accession to the European Union.	European Union	
Hungary	1	European Economic Community–Hungary Interim Agreement	16 December 1991	1 March 1992	1 February 1994	Goods	FTA	The agreement was superseded by a more comprehensive FTA with Hungary.	Europe Association Agreement	
Poland	1	European Economic Community–Poland Interim Agreement	16 December 1991	1 March 1992	1 February 1994	Goods	FTA	The agreement was superseded by a more comprehensive FTA with Poland.	Europe Association Agreement	
Austria	1	Austria–European Economic Community Agreement	22 July 1972	1 October 1972	1 January 1995	Goods	FTA	The agreement was terminated due to Austria's accession to the European Union.	European Union	
Sweden	1	European Economic Community–Sweden Agreement	22 July 1972	1 January 1973	1 January 1995	Goods	FTA	The agreement was terminated due to Sweden's accession to the European Union.	European Union	
Bulgaria	1	Bulgaria–European Economic Community Interim Agreement	8 March 1993	31 December 1993	1 February 1995	Goods	FTA	The agreement was superseded by a more comprehensive FTA with Bulgaria.	Europe Association Agreement	
Czech and Slovak Federative Republic/Czech Republic (Note: Dissolution of Czechoslovakia took place in 1993.)	1	Czech and Slovak Federal Republic–European Communities Europe Association Agreement	16 December 1991	1 March 1992	1 February 1995	Goods	FTA	The agreement was superseded by a more comprehensive Association Agreement with the Czech Republic.	Europe Association Agreement	
Romania	1	European Economic Community–Romania Interim Agreement	1 February 1993	1 May 1993	1 February 1995	Goods	FTA	The agreement was superseded by a more comprehensive FTA with Romania.	Europe Association Agreement	
Turkey	1	European Economic Community–Turkey Association Agreement	30 June 1973	1 January 1974	1 January 1996	Goods	FTA	The agreement was superseded by a customs union with Turkey.	Customs Union	
Slovenia	1	European Economic Community–Slovenia Cooperation Agreement	5 April 1993	19 July 1993	1 January 1997	Goods	FTA	The agreement was superseded by a more comprehensive FTA with Slovenia.	Interim Agreement	
Faroe Islands	1	European Economic Community–Faroe Islands Agreement	2 December 1991	1 January 1992	1 January 1997	Goods	FTA	The agreement was superseded by a more comprehensive FTA with the Faroe Islands.	Agreement	
Tunisia	1	European Economic Community–Tunisia Cooperation Agreement	25 April 1976	1 November 1978	1 March 1998	Goods	FTA	The agreement was superseded by an Association Agreement with Tunisia.	Euro-Mediterranean Association Agreement	
Morocco	1	European Economic Community–Morocco Cooperation Agreement	27 April 1976	1 November 1978	1 March 2000	Goods	FTA	The agreement was superseded by an Association Agreement with Morocco.	Euro-Mediterranean Association Agreement	
Israel	1	European Economic Community–Israel Agreement	11 May 1975	1 July 1975	1 June 2000	Goods	FTA	The agreement was superseded by an Association Agreement with Israel.	Euro-Mediterranean Association Agreement	
Jordan	1	European Economic Community–Jordan Cooperation Agreement	18 January 1977	1 November 1978	1 May 2002	Goods	FTA	The agreement was superseded by an Association Agreement with Jordan.	Euro-Mediterranean Association Agreement	
Lebanon	1	European Economic Community–Lebanon Cooperation Agreement	3 May 1977	1 November 1978	1 March 2003	Goods	FTA	The agreement was superseded by an Association Agreement with Lebanon.	Euro-Mediterranean Association Agreement	
Cyprus	1	Cyprus–European Economic Community Association Agreement	19 December 1972	1 June 1973	1 May 2004	Goods	CU	The agreement was terminated due to the Cyprus's accession to the European Union.	European Union	
Czech Republic	1	Czech Republic–European Communities Europe Association Agreement	4 October 1993	1 February 1995	1 May 2004	Goods & services	FTA & EIA	The agreement was terminated due to the Czech Republic's accession to the European Union.	European Union	
Estonia	1	Estonia–European Communities Europe Association Agreement	18 July 1994	1 January 1995	1 May 2004	Goods & services	FTA & EIA	The agreement was terminated due to Estonia's accession to the European Union.	European Union	
Hungary	1	European Communities–Hungary Europe Association Agreement	16 December 1991	1 February 1994	1 May 2004	Goods & services	FTA & EIA	The agreement was terminated due to the Hungary's accession to the European Union.	European Union	
Latvia	1	European Communities–Latvia Europe Association Agreement	18 July 1994	1 January 1995	1 May 2004	Goods & services	FTA & EIA	The agreement was terminated due to Latvia's accession to the European Union.	European Union	
Lithuania	1	European Communities–Lithuania Europe Association Agreement	18 July 1994	1 January 1995	1 May 2004	Goods & services	FTA & EIA	The agreement was terminated due to Lithuania's accession to the European Union.	European Union	
Malta	1	European Communities–Malta Europe Association Agreement	N/A	1 January 1973	1 May 2004	Goods	CU	The UK's accession to the European Economic Community coincided with the UK joining this agreement. The agreement was terminated due to Malta's accession to the European Union.	European Union	
Poland	1	European Communities–Poland Europe Association Agreement	16 December 1991	1 February 1994	1 May 2004	Goods & services	FTA & EIA	The agreement was terminated due to Poland's accession to the European Union.	European Union	
Slovenia	1	European Communities–Slovenia Interim Agreement	11 November 1996	1 January 1997	1 May 2004	Goods	FTA	The agreement was terminated due to Slovenia's accession to the European Union.	European Union	
Slovenia	1	European Communities–Slovenia Europe Association Agreement	10 June 1996	1 February 1999	1 May 2004	Services	EIA	The agreement was terminated due to Slovenia's accession to the European Union.	European Union	
Slovakia	1	European Communities–Slovakia Europe Association Agreement	4 October 1993	1 February 1995	1 May 2004	Goods & services	FTA & EIA	The agreement was terminated due to Slovakia's accession to the European Union.	European Union	
Egypt	1	Egypt–European Economic Community Cooperation Agreement	18 January 1977	1 November 1978	1 June 2004	Goods	FTA	The agreement was superseded by an Association Agreement with Egypt.	Euro-Mediterranean Association Agreement	
Algeria	1	Algeria–European Economic Community Cooperation Agreement	26 April 1976	1 July 1976	1 September 2005	Goods	FTA	The agreement was superseded by an Association Agreement with Algeria.	Euro-Mediterranean Association Agreement	
Bulgaria	1	Bulgaria–European Communities Europe Association Agreement	8 March 1993	1 February 1995	1 January 2007	Goods & services	FTA & EIA	The agreement was terminated due to Bulgaria's accession to the European Union.	European Union	
Romania	1	European Communities–Romania Europe Association Agreement	1 February 1993	1 February 1995	1 January 2007	Goods & services	FTA & EIA	The agreement was terminated due to Romania's accession to the European Union.	European Union	
Croatia	1	Croatia–European Communities Stabilisation and Association Agreement	29 October 2001	1 March 2002	1 July 2013	Goods & services (Note: The agreement only covered goods until 1 February 2005, when it expanded to cover services.)	FTA & EIA	The agreement was terminated due to Croatia's accession to the European Union.	European Union	
Albania	1	Albania–European Communities Stabilisation and Association Agreement	12 June 2006	1 April 2009	1 January 2021	Goods & services	FTA & EIA	The UK signed a trade continuity agreement with Albania on 5 February 2021.	Partnership, Trade and Cooperation Agreement	
Algeria	1	Algeria–European Community Euro-Mediterranean Association Agreement	22 April 2002	1 September 2005	1 January 2021	Goods	FTA	The UK has no free trade agreement with Algeria.	none	
Andorra	1	Andorra–European Economic Community Agreement	N/A	1 July 1991	1 January 2021	Goods	CU	The UK and the European Union agreed that Andorra–UK trade would be covered by the Trade and Cooperation Agreement.	Trade and Cooperation Agreement	
Armenia	1	Armenia–European Union Comprehensive and Enhanced Partnership Agreement	24 November 2017	1 June 2018	1 January 2021	Services	EIA	The UK has no free trade agreement with Armenia.	none	
Bosnia and Herzegovina	1	Bosnia and Herzegovina–European Communities Stabilisation and Association Agreement	16 June 2008	1 June 2015	1 January 2021	Goods & services	FTA & EIA	The UK has no free trade agreement with Bosnia and Herzegovina.	none	
Cameroon	1	Central Africa Party–European Community Economic Partnership Agreement	15 January 2009	4 August 2014	1 January 2021	Goods & services	FTA & EIA	The UK signed a trade continuity agreement with Cameroon on 28 December 2020.	Economic Partnership Agreement	
Canada	1	Canada–European Union Comprehensive Economic and Trade Agreement	30 October 2016	21 September 2017	1 January 2021	Goods & services	FTA & EIA	The UK signed a trade continuity agreement with Canada on 8 December 2020.	Trade Continuity Agreement	
CARIFORUM; Antigua and Barbuda; Bahamas; Barbados; Belize; Dominica; Dominican Republic; Grenada; Guyana; Jamaica; Saint Kitts and Nevis; Saint Lucia; Saint Vincent and the Grenadines; Suriname; Trinidad and Tobago	14	CARIFORUM–European Community Economic Partnership Agreement	15 October 2008	29 December 2008	1 January 2021	Goods & services	FTA & EIA	The UK signed a trade continuity agreement with the CARIFORUM states on 22 March 2019.	CARIFORUM–United Kingdom Economic Partnership Agreement	
Central America; Costa Rica; El Salvador; Guatemala; Honduras; Nicaragua; Panama	6	Central America–European Union Association Agreement	29 June 2012	1 August 2013 (Note: Trade with Costa Rica and El Salvador entered into force on 1 October 2013. Trade with Guatemala entered into force on 1 December 2013.)	1 January 2021	Goods & services	FTA & EIA	The UK signed a trade continuity agreement with Central America on 18 July 2019.	Central America–United Kingdom Association Agreement	
Chile	1	Chile–European Community Association Agreement	18 November 2002	1 February 2003	1 January 2021	Goods & services (Note: The agreement only covered goods until 1 March 2005, when it expanded to cover services.)	FTA & EIA	The UK signed a trade continuity agreement with Chile on 30 January 2019.	Association Agreement	
Colombia; Ecuador; Peru	3	Colombia, Ecuador and Peru–European Union Trade Agreement	26 June 2012 (Note: Ecuador signed the agreement on 1 January 2017.)	1 March 2013 (Note: Trade with Ecuador entered into force on 11 November 2016.)	1 January 2021	Goods & services	FTA & EIA	The UK signed a trade continuity agreement with Colombia, Ecuador and Peru states on 15 May 2019.	Andean Countries–United Kingdom Trade Agreement	
Eastern and Southern Africa; Comoros; Madagascar; Mauritius; Seychelles; Zimbabwe	5	Eastern and Southern Africa–European Community Economic Partnership Agreement	29 August 2009	14 May 2012	1 January 2021	Goods	FTA	The UK signed a trade continuity agreement with the Eastern and Southern Africa states on 31 January 2019.	Eastern and Southern Africa–UK Economic Partnership Agreement	
Egypt	1	Egypt–European Communities Euro-Mediterranean Association Agreement	25 June 2001	1 June 2004	1 January 2021	Goods	FTA	The UK signed a trade continuity agreement with Egypt on 5 December 2020.	Association Agreement	
Faroe Islands	1	European Community–Faroe Islands Agreement	6 December 1996	1 January 1997	1 January 2021	Goods	FTA	The UK signed a trade continuity agreement with the Faroe Islands on 31 January 2019.	Free Trade Agreement	
Georgia	1	European Union–Georgia Association Agreement	27 June 2014	1 September 2014	1 January 2021	Goods & services	FTA & EIA	The UK signed a trade continuity agreement with Georgia on 21 October 2019.	Strategic Partnership and Cooperation Agreement	
Ghana	1	European Community–Ghana Stepping Stone Economic Partnership Agreement	28 July 2016	15 December 2016	1 January 2021	Goods	FTA	The UK signed a trade continuity agreement with Ghana on 2 March 2021.	Interim Trade Partnership Agreement	
Iceland	1	European Economic Community–Iceland Agreement	19 December 1972	1 April 1973	1 January 2021	Goods	FTA	The UK signed a trade continuity agreement with Iceland on 8 December 2020.	Iceland–Norway–UK Trade Agreement	
Israel	1	European Communities–Israel Euro-Mediterranean Association Agreement	20 November 1995	1 June 2000	1 January 2021	Goods	FTA	The UK signed a trade continuity agreement with Israel on 18 February 2019.	Trade and Partnership Agreement	
Ivory Coast	1	European Community–Ivory Coast Stepping Stone Economic Partnership Agreement	26 November 2008	3 September 2016	1 January 2021	Goods	FTA	The UK signed a trade continuity agreement with Ivory Coast on 15 October 2020.	Stepping Stone Economic Partnership Agreement	
Japan	1	European Union–Japan Economic Partnership Agreement	17 July 2018	1 February 2019	1 January 2021	Goods & services	FTA & EIA	The UK signed a new free trade agreement with Japan on 23 October 2020.	Comprehensive Economic Partnership Agreement	
Jordan	1	European Communities–Jordan Euro-Mediterranean Association Agreement	24 November 1997	1 May 2002	1 January 2021	Goods	FTA	The UK signed a trade continuity agreement with Jordan on 5 November 2019.	Association Agreement	
Kosovo	1	European Union–Kosovo Stabilisation and Association Agreement	27 October 2015	1 April 2016	1 January 2021	Goods & services	FTA	The UK signed a trade continuity agreement with Kosovo on 3 December 2019.	Partnership, Trade and Cooperation Agreement	
Lebanon	1	European Community–Lebanon Euro-Mediterranean Association Agreement	17 June 2002	1 March 2003	1 January 2021	Goods	FTA	The UK signed a trade continuity agreement with Lebanon on 19 September 2019.	Association Agreement	
Liechtenstein; Switzerland	2	European Economic Community–Switzerland Agreement	N/A	1 January 1973	1 January 2021	Goods	FTA	The UK's accession to the European Economic Community coincided with the UK joining this agreement. The UK signed a trade continuity agreement with Liechtenstein and Switzerland on 8 December 2020.	Switzerland–Liechtenstein–United Kingdom Trade Agreement	
Mexico	1	European Community–Mexico Economic Partnership, Political Coordination and Cooperation Agreement	8 December 1997	1 July 2000	1 January 2021	Goods & services	FTA & EIA	The UK signed a trade continuity agreement with Mexico on 15 December 2020.	Trade Continuity Agreement	
Moldova	1	European Union–Moldova Association Agreement	27 June 2014	1 September 2014	1 January 2021	Goods & services	FTA & EIA	The UK signed a trade continuity agreement with Moldova on 24 December 2020.	Strategic Partnership, Trade and Cooperation Agreement	
Montenegro	1	European Communities–Montenegro Stabilisation and Association Agreement	15 October 2007	1 May 2010	1 January 2021	Goods & services	FTA & EIA	The UK has no free trade agreement with Montenegro.	none	
Morocco	1	European Community–Morocco Euro-Mediterranean Association Agreement	26 February 1996	1 March 2000	1 January 2021	Goods	FTA	The UK signed a trade continuity agreement with Morocco on 26 October 2019.	Association Agreement	
North Macedonia	1	European Communities–Former Yugoslav Republic of Macedonia Stabilisation and Association Agreement	9 April 2001	1 June 2001	1 January 2021	Goods & services	FTA & EIA	The UK signed a trade continuity agreement with North Macedonia on 3 December 2020.	Partnership, Trade and Cooperation Agreement	
Norway	1	European Economic Community–Norway Agreement	N/A	1 January 1973	1 January 2021	Goods	FTA	The UK's accession to the European Economic Community coincided with the UK joining this agreement. The UK signed a trade continuity agreement with Norway on 8 December 2020.	Iceland–Norway–UK Trade Agreement	
Overseas Countries and Territories; Anguilla; Aruba; Bermuda; Bonaire; British Antarctic Territory; British Indian Ocean Territory; British Virgin Islands; Cayman Islands; Curaçao; Falkland Islands; French Polynesia; French Southern and Antarctic Lands; Greenland; Montserrat; New Caledonia; Pitcairn Islands; Saba; Saint Barthélemy; Saint Helena, Ascension and Tristan da Cunha; Saint Pierre and Miquelon; Sint Eustatius; Sint Maarten; South Georgia and the South Sandwich Islands; Wallis and Futuna	24	European Union–Overseas Countries and Territories Free Trade Agreement	27 November 2001	2 December 2001	1 January 2021	Goods	FTA	The UK has no free trade agreement with any of the EU Overseas Countries and Territories.	none	
Pacific States; Fiji; Papua New Guinea; Samoa; Solomon Islands	4	European Community–Pacific States Interim Partnership Agreement	30 July 2009 (Note: Fiji signed the agreement on 11 December 2009.)	20 December 2009 (Note: Trade with Fiji entered into force on 28 July 2014. Trade with Samoa entered into force on 31 December 2018. Trade with the Solomon Islands entered into force on 17 May 2020.)	1 January 2021	Goods	FTA	The UK signed a trade continuity agreement with the Pacific States on 14 March 2019.	Pacific States–United Kingdom Economic Partnership Agreement	
Palestinian Authority	1	European Community–Palestinian Authority Euro-Mediterranean Interim Association Agreement	24 February 1997	1 July 1997	1 January 2021	Goods	FTA	The UK signed a trade continuity agreement with the Palestinian Authority on 18 February 2019.	Political, Trade and Partnership Agreement	
San Marino	1	European Economic Community–San Marino Cooperation and Customs Union Agreement	16 December 1991	1 April 2002	1 January 2021	Goods	CU	The UK and the European Union agreed that San Marino–UK trade would be covered by the Trade and Cooperation Agreement.	Trade and Cooperation Agreement	
Serbia	1	European Communities–Serbia Stabilisation and Association Agreement	29 April 2008	1 February 2010	1 January 2021	Goods & services	FTA & EIA	The UK signed a trade continuity agreement with Serbia on 16 April 2021.	Partnership, Trade and Cooperation Agreement	
Singapore	1	European Union–Singapore Free Trade Agreement	19 October 2018	21 November 2019	1 January 2021	Goods & services	FTA & EIA	The UK signed a trade continuity agreement with Singapore on 10 December 2020.	Free Trade Agreement	
South Africa	1	European Community–South Africa Trade, Development and Cooperation Agreement	11 October 1999	1 January 2000	1 January 2021	Goods	FTA	The UK signed a trade continuity agreement with South Africa on 16 October 2019.	Southern Africa Customs Union and Mozambique–UK Economic Partnership Agreement	
South Korea	1	European Union–South Korea Free Trade Agreement	6 October 2010	1 July 2011	1 January 2021	Goods & services	FTA & EIA	The UK signed a trade continuity agreement with South Korea on 22 August 2019.	Trade Agreement	
Southern African Development Community; Botswana; Eswatini; Lesotho; Mozambique; Namibia; South Africa	6	European Union–Southern African Development Community Economic Partnership Agreement	10 June 2016	10 October 2016 (Note: Trade with Mozambique entered into force on 4 February 2018.)	1 January 2021	Goods	FTA	The UK signed a trade continuity agreement with Mozambique and the Southern African Customs Union on 9 October 2019.	Southern Africa Customs Union and Mozambique–UK Economic Partnership Agreement	
Syria	1	European Economic Community–Syria Cooperation Agreement	18 January 1977	1 July 1977	1 January 2021	Goods	FTA	The UK has no free trade agreement with Syria.	none	
Tunisia	1	European Communities–Tunisia Euro-Mediterranean Association Agreement	7 July 1995	1 March 1998	1 January 2021	Goods	FTA	The UK signed a trade continuity agreement with Tunisia on 4 October 2019.	Association Agreement	
Turkey	1	European Economic Community–Turkey Customs Union	6 March 1995	1 January 1996	1 January 2021	Goods	CU	The UK signed a trade continuity agreement with Turkey on 29 December 2020.	Trade Agreement	
Ukraine	1	European Union–Ukraine Association Agreement	27 June 2014	23 April 2014	1 January 2021	Goods & services	FTA & EIA	The UK signed a trade continuity agreement with Ukraine on 8 October 2020.	Political, Free Trade and Strategic Partnership Agreement	
Vietnam	1	European Union–Vietnam Free Trade Agreement	30 June 2019	1 August 2020	1 January 2021	Goods & services	FTA & EIA	The UK signed a trade continuity agreement with Vietnam on 29 December 2020.	Free Trade Agreement	

== Largest trading partners ==
Export and import markets for goods and services in 2024, seasonally adjusted Figures in £billions sterling
Exports				Imports			
Rank	Trade partner	£billions	% of total	Rank	Trade partner	£billions	% of total
	European Union	366.3	41.0%		European Union	459.5	50.0%
1.	United States (Note: including Puerto Rico)	196.3	22.5%	1.	United States	118.3	13.1%
2.	Germany (EU member)	61.1	7.0%	2.	Germany (EU member)	85.3	9.4%
3.	Ireland (EU member)	51.6	5.9%	3.	China	68.7	7.6%
4.	Netherlands (EU member)	50.8	5.8%	4.	Netherlands (EU member)	59.8	6.6%
5.	France (EU member)	46.2	5.3%	5.	France (EU member)	58.0	6.4%
6.	China	29.7	3.4%	6.	Spain (EU member)	44.5	4.9%
7.	Belgium (EU member)	26.0	3.0%	7.	Belgium (EU member)	34.7	3.8%
8.	Switzerland (EFTA )	25.5	2.9%	8.	Italy (EU member)	34.4	3.8%
9.	Spain (EU member)	20.1	2.3%	9.	Ireland (EU member)	30.4	3.4%
10.	Italy (EU member)	18.5	2.1%	10.	Norway (EFTA)	28.4	3.1%
	EU	366.3	41.0%		EU	459.5	50.0%
	Non EU	526.9	59.0%		Non EU	459.2	50.0%
	World	893.2	100%		World	918.7	100%

Historically, WTO imports and exports are based on the rule of origin, while EU imports/exports are based on single market statistics.

The figures above are for 2024.

== See also ==
- Accession of the United Kingdom to CPTPP
- Economic Partnership Agreements
- Free trade agreements of Canada
- Free trade agreements of India
- Free trade agreements of Israel
- Free trade agreements of New Zealand
- Free trade agreements of the European Union
- Free trade agreements of the United States
- Free trade agreements of Turkey
- Foreign relations of the United Kingdom
- List of multilateral free trade agreements
- List of bilateral free trade agreements
- United Kingdom common framework policies
- United Kingdom–Crown Dependencies Customs Union
