= Singapore–United Kingdom Free Trade Agreement =

Free trade agreement between the United Kingdom and Singapore

Free Trade Agreement between Singapore and the United Kingdom
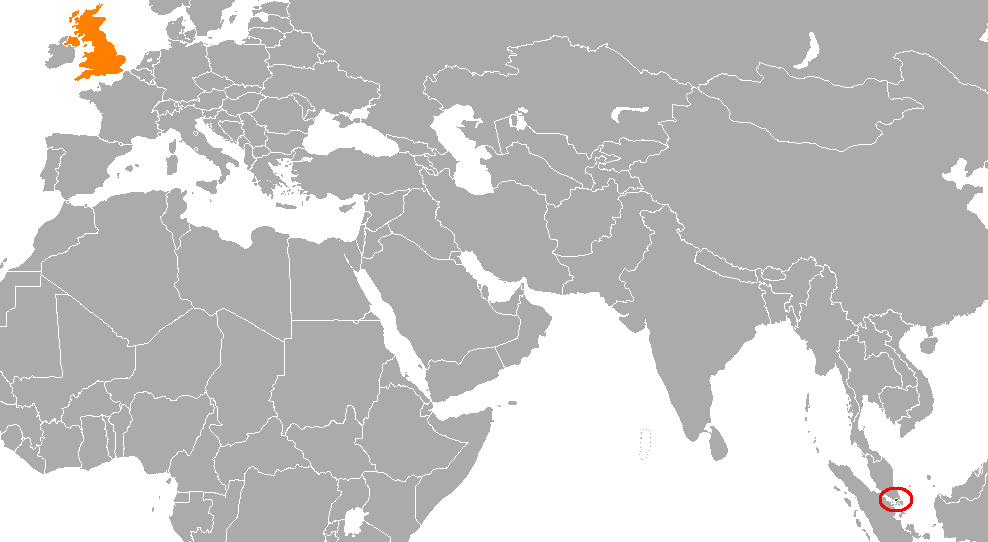
- Singapore United Kingdom
- Type: Free Trade Agreement and Economic Integration Agreement
- Context: Continuity trade agreement between Singapore and the United Kingdom
- Signed: 10 December 2020
- Location: Singapore
- Effective: 1 January 2021
- Condition: Ratification by both signatories
- Negotiators: Chan Chun Sing; Liz Truss
- Parties: Singapore; United Kingdom
- Language: English

The Singapore–United Kingdom Free Trade Agreement (SUKFTA) is a free trade agreement between the United Kingdom and Singapore. It was signed prior to the withdrawal of the United Kingdom from the European Union as a Continuity trade agreement in order to protect trade and investment between the two parties as the UK would no longer be a party of the European Union–Singapore Free Trade Agreement. The agreement replicates the European Union–Singapore FTA terms with minor changes.

Trade value between the United Kingdom and Singapore was worth £20,626 million in 2022.

== Digital Economy Agreement ==
Singapore and the United Kingdom signed a digital economy agreement on 25 February 2022, the agreement expands the SUKFTA to cover digital trade. The Singapore–United Kingdom Digital Economy Agreement (SUKDEA) entered into force on 14 June 2022.

== See also ==
- Economy of Singapore
- Economy of the United Kingdom
- European Union–Singapore Free Trade Agreement
- Free trade agreements of the United Kingdom
- Foreign relations of Singapore
- Foreign relations of the United Kingdom
