= China–Caribbean relations =

Caribbean–China relations
- Caribbean: China

Caribbean

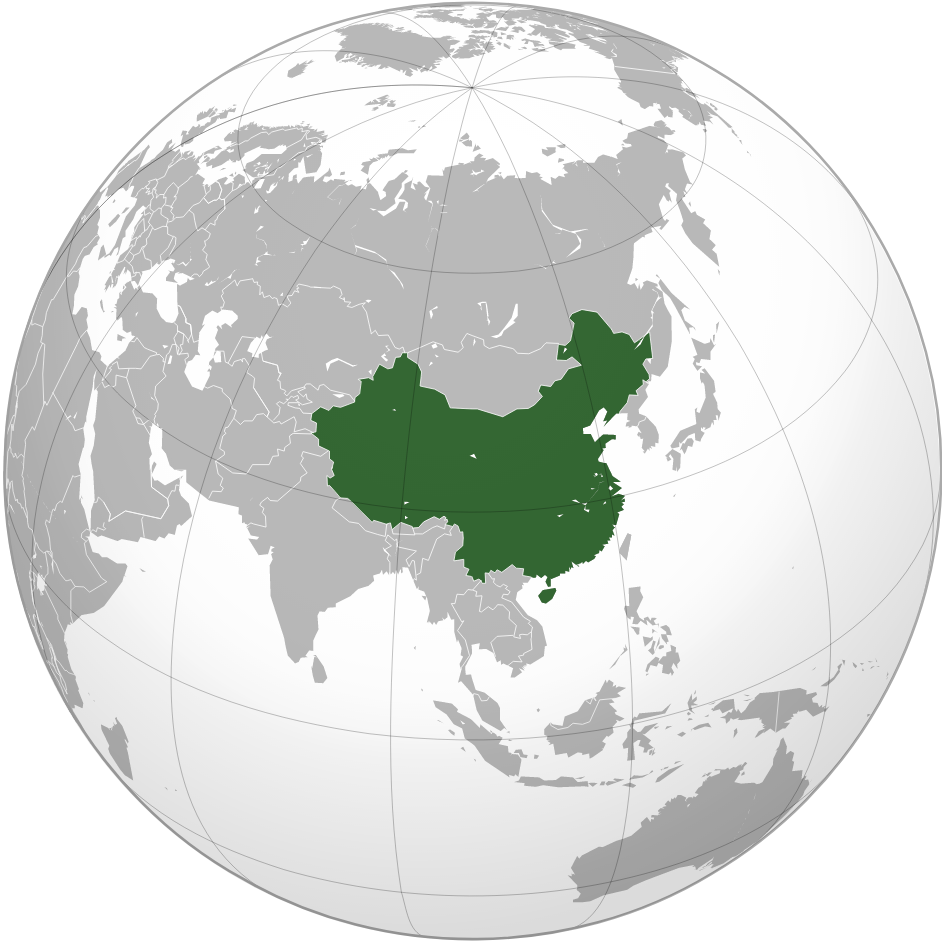
People's Republic of China

China plays an increasing important role of economic and developmental importance in the region and the relations with China have increased steadily over time. Historically, relations were mostly based upon trade, credits, and light investments, which have increased significantly since the 1990s. For many Caribbean nations, the increasing ties with China have been used as a way to decrease long time over-dependence on western developed nations, and as a move towards South-South cooperation alongside deepening of relations with neighbouring Latin America and Africa.

The Overseas Chinese population, in this case Chinese Caribbeans, have been resident in the Caribbean region for centuries and have helped to make importaint contributions with cultural, trade, and political links in the region. For example, Sir Solomon Hochoy of Trinidad and Tobago and Arthur Chung of Guyana were among the first of ethnic Chinese ancestry to lead countries in the Americas. In more modern times China has also expanded several levels of cooperation with the Caribbean nations.

China and the Government of the Republic of Trinidad and Tobago were said to have formed an agreement where asphalt from Trinidad and Tobago would be exported to China during its construction boom in preparation for the 2008 Beijing Olympics. In exchange, China has led several construction projects in Trinidad and Tobago and the Caribbean region via Chinese owned construction companies. Trinidad and Tobago has also mooted the idea of starting direct shipments of oil and liquid natural gas direct from Trinidad and Tobago to China, to fuel the later's growing need for resources to fuel their economy.

As the Caribbean political heads of government have had several messy run-ins with the Bush administration in the United States with respect to recent demands, China has been more sympathetic to the Caribbean position globally and has stepped up military training exercises in the Caribbean for example in direct response to several sanctions placed on governments in the Caribbean region for not following the wishes of the Bush administration.

Several capital-works or infrastructural projects across the Caribbean region have also been financed or extended full grants by the Chinese government.

== Visa free travel ==
In recent years China has signed a collection of short-term bilateral reciprocal visa-free travel agreements along with nations in the Caribbean region.

== China's foreign relations with Caribbean countries ==
Relations between China and the Caribbean
Sovereign states

- Antigua and Barbuda–China relations
- (The Bahamas) Bahamas–China relations
- Barbados–China relations
- China–Cuba relations
- China–Dominica relations
- China–Dominican Republic relations
- China–Grenada relations
- China–Haiti relations
- China–Jamaica relations
- China–Saint Kitts and Nevis relations
- China–Saint Lucia relations
- China–Saint Vincent and the Grenadines relations
- China–Trinidad and Tobago relations

== See also ==
- Afro-Asians
- Foreign relations of China
- Sino-African relations
- Sino-Latin America relations
- Sino-Pacific relations
- Chinese Caribbeans
  - Chinese Jamaicans
- Caribbean Chinese cuisine
- One China Policy
- Internationalization of the renminbi
- List of the largest trading partners of China
