= Foreign relations of Dominica =

Like its Eastern Caribbean neighbours, the main priority of Dominica's foreign relations is economic development. The country maintains missions in Washington, New York, London, and Brussels and is represented jointly with other Organisation of Eastern Caribbean States (OECS) members in Canada. Dominica is also a member of the Caribbean Development Bank (CDB), Organisation internationale de la Francophonie, and the Commonwealth of Nations. It became a member of the United Nations and the International Monetary Fund (IMF) in 1978 and of the World Bank and Organization of American States (OAS) in 1979.

As a member of CARICOM, in July 1994 Dominica strongly backed efforts by the United States to implement United Nations Security Council Resolution 940, designed to facilitate the departure of Haiti's de facto authorities from power. The country agreed to contribute personnel to the multinational force, which restored the democratically elected government of Haiti in October 1994.

In May 1997, Prime Minister James joined 14 other Caribbean leaders, and President Clinton, during the first-ever U.S.-regional summit in Bridgetown, Barbados. The summit strengthened the basis for regional cooperation on justice and counternarcotics issues, finance and development, and trade. Dominica previously maintained official relations with the Republic of China (commonly known as "Taiwan") instead of the People's Republic of China, but on 23 March 2004, a joint communique was signed in Beijing, paving the way for diplomatic recognition of the People's Republic. Beijing responded to Dominica's severing relations with the Republic of China by giving them a $12 million aid package, which includes $6 million in budget support for the year 2004 and $1 million annually for six years.

In June 2020, Dominica was one of 53 countries backing the Hong Kong national security law at the United Nations.

Dominica is also a member of the International Criminal Court with a Bilateral Immunity Agreement of protection for the US-military (as covered under Article 98).

== International disputes ==
Dominica claims Venezuelan waters around controlled Isla Aves (Known in Dominica as Bird Rock) located roughly 90 km. west of Dominica.

== Diplomatic relations ==
List of countries which Dominica maintains diplomatic relations with

#	Country	Date
1	Antigua and Barbuda	Unknown
2	Bahamas	Unknown
3	Grenada	Unknown
4	Haiti	Unknown
5	Saint Vincent and the Grenadines	Unknown
6	Barbados	3 November 1978
7	Guyana	3 November 1978
8	Jamaica	3 November 1978
9	South Korea	3 November 1978
10	United Kingdom	3 November 1978
11	Japan	12 November 1978
12	France	17 January 1979
13	Israel	January 1979
14	Suriname	1 March 1979
15	Canada	14 March 1979
16	Mexico	19 April 1979
17	Luxembourg	1 May 1979
18	United States	18 July 1979
19	Venezuela	21 December 1979
20	Saint Lucia	1979
21	Netherlands	4 February 1980
22	Colombia	3 June 1980
23	Spain	29 September 1980
24	Germany	9 December 1980
25	Belgium	1980
26	India	8 January 1981
—	Holy See	1 September 1981
27	Belize	21 September 1981
28	Australia	17 January 1982
29	Trinidad and Tobago	June 1983
30	Saint Kitts and Nevis	1983
31	Sweden	3 May 1984
32	Italy	23 March 1985
33	Argentina	13 June 1985
34	Peru	18 March 1986
35	Brazil	9 April 1986
36	North Korea	21 January 1991
37	Chile	4 October 1991
38	Slovenia	9 July 1993
39	Indonesia	19 April 1994
40	Russia	19 May 1995
41	Czech Republic	13 March 1996
42	Cuba	18 May 1996
43	North Macedonia	18 October 1996
44	Portugal	27 December 1996
45	South Africa	29 April 1998
46	Austria	1999
47	Libya	15 January 2001
48	Norway	26 March 2001
49	Costa Rica	10 May 2001
50	Ireland	6 July 2001
51	Cyprus	13 July 2001
52	Nigeria	2002
53	Mauritius	23 September 2003
54	Qatar	20 February 2004
55	China	23 March 2004
56	Iceland	29 June 2004
57	Belarus	9 July 2004
58	Maldives	21 July 2004
59	Malta	11 February 2005
60	Greece	15 November 2005
61	Thailand	25 November 2005
62	Switzerland	2005
63	Slovakia	7 February 2006
64	Turkey	13 April 2006
65	Algeria	22 June 2006
66	Estonia	13 February 2007
67	Botswana	23 July 2007
68	Latvia	27 September 2007
69	Hungary	2 June 2008
70	Dominican Republic	23 July 2008
71	Saudi Arabia	23 January 2009
72	Senegal	28 January 2009
73	Romania	30 January 2009
74	Monaco	27 February 2009
75	Nicaragua	2 June 2009
76	Poland	4 June 2009
77	Ecuador	24 June 2009
78	Guatemala	12 August 2009
79	Finland	19 August 2009
80	Ethiopia	2009
81	Serbia	22 April 2010
82	Cambodia	27 April 2010
83	Morocco	23 June 2010
84	Egypt	7 July 2010
85	Georgia	15 December 2010
86	Montenegro	25 February 2011
87	Uruguay	25 February 2011
88	Azerbaijan	4 March 2011
89	Solomon Islands	7 March 2011
90	Tajikistan	13 April 2011
91	Bulgaria	28 April 2011
92	Philippines	29 April 2011
93	Mongolia	18 October 2011
94	Panama	15 March 2012
95	Moldova	29 May 2012
96	Bolivia	5 June 2012
97	Singapore	6 June 2012
98	Gambia	26 July 2012
99	Tuvalu	26 July 2012
—	Kosovo	12 December 2012
100	Croatia	20 April 2013
101	Kazakhstan	30 April 2013
102	El Salvador	5 June 2013
103	Lithuania	7 October 2013
104	Vietnam	1 November 2013
105	Bosnia and Herzegovina	6 March 2014
106	Fiji	21 March 2014
107	New Zealand	26 March 2014
108	Honduras	5 June 2014
109	United Arab Emirates	17 December 2014
110	Malaysia	19 January 2015
111	Paraguay	5 March 2015
112	Turkmenistan	13 October 2016
113	Kyrgyzstan	17 October 2016
114	Djibouti	9 January 2018
115	Ghana	18 January 2018
116	Kiribati	22 January 2018
—	State of Palestine	18 March 2018
117	Sri Lanka	17 April 2018
118	Iran	2018
119	Palau	2018
120	Denmark	20 February 2019
121	Armenia	5 April 2019
122	Ukraine	25 April 2019
123	Cape Verde	15 May 2019
124	Brunei	22 January 2020
125	Kenya	1 July 2020
126	Bangladesh	24 November 2020
127	Rwanda	15 April 2021
128	Afghanistan	27 April 2021
129	Andorra	30 April 2021
130	Nepal	30 April 2021
131	Uganda	4 May 2021
132	Eritrea	11 May 2021
133	Uzbekistan	14 May 2021
134	San Marino	16 June 2021
135	Seychelles	23 June 2021
136	Laos	29 July 2021
137	Sudan	13 August 2021
138	Kuwait	10 September 2021
139	Vanuatu	20 September 2021
140	Timor-Leste	15 November 2021
—	Syria (suspended)	7 March 2022
141	Bahrain	23 September 2022
142	Gabon	14 March 2023
143	Pakistan	6 February 2024
144	Benin	24 September 2024
145	Tonga	25 October 2024
146	Ivory Coast	5 February 2025
147	Albania	20 March 2025
148	Sierra Leone	24 March 2025
149	Comoros	23 September 2025
150	São Tomé and Príncipe	23 September 2025
151	Republic of the Congo	25 September 2025

== Bilateral relations ==
Country	Formal relations began	Notes
Australia	17 January 1982	Australia is represented in Dominica through its High Commission in Trinidad and Tobago.
Austria	1999	Since 2016, Austria is represented in Dominica by its embassy in Havana, Cuba.; Dominica does not have any representation in Austria.
Azerbaijan	4 March 2011	Prime Minister Roosevelt Skerrit made an official visit to Azerbaijan in 2022.
Bulgaria	28 April 2011	Bulgaria is represented in Dominica through its embassy in Cuba.
Canada	14 March 1979	Bilateral relations are described as "close and friendly."; Canada is represented in Dominica, through its High Commission in Barbados.
Colombia	3 June 1980	Colombia is represented in Dominica through its embassy in Kingston, Jamaica.
Chile	4 October 1991	Both countries have diplomatic relations. Both countries waived visa for diplomatic passports holders.
China	23 March 2004	See China–Dominica relations Diplomatic relations were established on 31 March 2004, when Dominica suspended ties with the Republic of China (Taiwan).
Cuba	18 May 1996	In December 2005, during the second CARICOM/CUBA summit held in Barbados, heads of CARICOM and Cuba agreed to deepen their ties in the areas of socio-economic and political cooperation in addition to medical care assistance. Since the meeting, Cuba has opened four additional embassies in the Caribbean Community including Dominica.
France	17 January 1979	France is represented in Dominica, through its embassy in Saint Lucia. Dominica and France have signed many bilateral agreements.
Germany	9 December 1980	Political and economic relations are friendly but fairly low-key.
Greece	15 November 2005	Greece is represented in Dominica via parallel accreditation of its embassy in Caracas. Dominica has appointed an ambassador accredited to Greece, based in Roseau, Dominica.
Guyana	3 November 1978	Guyana has a High Commission in Roseau.
Hungary	2 June 2008	Hungary is represented in Dominica by its embassy in Havana, Cuba.
Iceland	29 June 2004	Iceland is represented in Dominica through its embassy in New York, United States. Both countries have an agreement on cooperation on geothermal energy.
Ireland	6 July 2001	Ireland is represented in Dominica through its embassy in Havana, Cuba.
India	8 January 1981	See Dominica–India relations
Indonesia	19 April 1994	Indonesia is represented in Dominica through its embassy in Caracas, Venezuela
Israel	January 1979	Both countries have an agreement on visa abolition.
Italy	23 March 1985	Italy is represented in Dominica by its embassy in Caracas, Venezuela.
Japan	12 November 1978	Japan is represented in Dominica through its embassy in Trinidad and Tobago.
Malaysia	19 January 2015	Malaysia is represented in Dominica by its embassy in Caracas, Venezuela.
Mexico	19 April 1979	See Dominica–Mexico relations: Mexico is accredited to Dominica from its embassy in Castries, Saint Lucia and maintains an honorary consulate in Roseau.
Monaco	27 February 2009	Dominica is represented in Monaco through it embassy in Paris, France.
Netherlands	4 February 1980	Dominica is represented in the Netherlands by its embassy in London, United Kingdom.; The Netherlands are represented in Dominica by their embassy in Port of Spain, Trinidad and Tobago.
New Zealand	5 June 2014	New Zealand is represented in Dominica by its High Commission in Bridgetown, Barbados.
Norway	26 March 2001	Both countries have signed an Agreement concerning the exchange of information relating to tax matters which came into force on 1 January 2012
Russia	19 May 1995	In April 2018, Dominica has appointed a resident ambassador to the Russia.
Slovakia	7 February 2006	Slovakia is represented in Dominica through its embassy in Havana.
Slovenia	9 July 1993	Dominica is represented in Slovenia through its embassy in London.
South Korea	3 November 1978	Since November 1978, the bilateral relations have been cordial and fruitful.
Turkey	13 April 2006	The Embassy of Turkey in Santo Domingo is accredited to Dominica.; Trade volume between the two countries was US$1.6 million in 2019.
Ukraine	25 April 2019	They also signed a visa waver agreement.
United Kingdom	3 November 1978	See Dominica–United Kingdom relations: Dominica maintains a high commission in London.; The United Kingdom is not accredited to Dominica through a high commission; the UK develops relations through its high commission in Bridgetown, Barbados.; The UK governed Dominica from 1763 to 1978, when Dominica achieved full independence. Both countries share common membership of the Atlantic Co-operation Pact, Caribbean Development Bank, the Commonwealth, the International Criminal Court, the United Nations, and the World Trade Organization, as well as the CARIFORUM–UK Economic Partnership Agreement. Bilaterally the two countries have a Tax Information Exchange Agreement, and an Investment Agreement.
United States	18 July 1979	See Dominica–United States relations The United States and Dominica have friendly relations. United States supports the Dominican government's efforts to expand its economic base and to provide a higher standard of living for its citizens. U.S. assistance is primarily channeled through multilateral agencies such as the World Bank and the Caribbean Development Bank, as well as through the U.S. Agency for International Development office in Bridgetown, Barbados.
Venezuela	21 December 1979	President of Venezuela Hugo Chávez visited Dominica in 2007.

== Dominica and the Commonwealth of Nations ==
The Commonwealth of Dominica has been a member of the Commonwealth of Nations since 1978, when it became an independent from the United Kingdom as a republic in the Commonwealth of Nations.

Dominica's highest court of appeal is the Caribbean Court of Justice, in effect from 6 March 2015. Previously, the nation's ultimate court of appeal was the Judicial Committee of the Privy Council in London.

== See also ==
- West Indies Associated States
- Organisation of Eastern Caribbean States
- List of diplomatic missions in Dominica
- List of diplomatic missions of Dominica
- Dominica–France Maritime Delimitation Agreement
