= Foreign relations of Antigua and Barbuda =

Antigua and Barbuda maintains diplomatic relations with the United States, Canada, the United Kingdom, and the People's Republic of China, as well as with many Latin American countries and neighbouring Eastern Caribbean states. It is a member of the United Nations, the Commonwealth of Nations, the Organization of American States, the Organisation of Eastern Caribbean States, the Bolivarian Alliance for the Americas, Petrocaribe and the Eastern Caribbean's Regional Security System (RSS).

As a member of CARICOM, Antigua and Barbuda supported efforts by the United States to implement UN Security Council Resolution 940, designed to facilitate the departure of Haiti's de facto authorities from power. The country agreed to contribute personnel to the multinational force which restored the democratically elected government of Haiti in October 1994.

In May 1997, Prime Minister Lester Bird joined 14 other Caribbean leaders and U.S. President Bill Clinton for the first-ever U.S.-regional summit in Bridgetown, Barbados. The summit strengthened the basis for regional co-operation on justice and counter-narcotics issues, finance and development, and trade.

Antigua and Barbuda is also a member of the International Criminal Court with a Bilateral Immunity Agreement of protection for the U.S. military (as covered under Article 98).

== Diplomatic relations ==
Countries with which Antigua and Barbuda has diplomatic relations
| # | Country | Date |
|---|---|---|
| 1 | Canada | 1 November 1981 |
| 2 | South Korea | 1 November 1981 |
| 3 | United Kingdom | 1 November 1981 |
| 4 | United States | 1 November 1981 |
| 5 | Malaysia | 1981 |
| 6 | Australia | 17 January 1982 |
| 7 | Brazil | 2 February 1982 |
| 8 | Guyana | 3 February 1982 |
| 9 | Colombia | 18 March 1982 |
| 10 | India | 2 April 1982 |
| 11 | Germany | 4 May 1982 |
| 12 | France | 6 May 1982 |
| 13 | Netherlands | 11 May 1982 |
| 14 | Sweden | 11 June 1982 |
| 15 | Venezuela | 11 June 1982 |
| 16 | Iraq | 14 September 1982 |
| 17 | Japan | 4 October 1982 |
| 18 | Trinidad and Tobago | 6 December 1982 |
| 19 | China | 1 January 1983 |
| 20 | Belize | 4 February 1983 |
| 21 | Jamaica | 8 February 1983 |
| 22 | Nigeria | 2 March 1983 |
| 23 | Uganda | 2 March 1983 |
| 24 | Zambia | 2 March 1983 |
| 25 | Portugal | 20 March 1983 |
| 26 | Syria | 18 April 1983 |
| 27 | Israel | 22 June 1983 |
| 28 | Barbados | 19 September 1983 |
| 29 | Saint Kitts and Nevis | 19 September 1983 |
| 30 | Switzerland | 14 December 1983 |
| 31 | Bahamas | 1983 |
| 32 | Saint Lucia | 1983 |
| 33 | Costa Rica | 16 January 1984 |
| 34 | Mexico | 14 September 1984 |
| 35 | Argentina | 7 December 1984 |
| 36 | Austria | 25 March 1985 |
| 37 | Greece | 10 June 1985 |
| 38 | Peru | 24 June 1985 |
| 39 | Italy | 20 August 1985 |
| 40 | Bolivia | 26 August 1985 |
| 41 | Norway | 14 October 1985 |
| 42 | Denmark | 27 October 1985 |
| 43 | Belgium | 30 October 1985 |
| – | Holy See | 15 December 1986 |
| 44 | Uruguay | 27 April 1987 |
| 45 | Spain | 27 June 1988 |
| 46 | Suriname | 10 October 1989 |
| 47 | Algeria | 1 November 1989 |
| 48 | Russia | 5 January 1990 |
| 49 | Chile | 10 August 1990 |
| 50 | North Korea | 27 November 1990 |
| 51 | Guatemala | 3 February 1992 |
| 52 | Nicaragua | 20 February 1992 |
| 53 | Ukraine | 17 March 1993 |
| 54 | El Salvador | 18 March 1993 |
| 55 | Latvia | 19 March 1993 |
| 56 | Estonia | 4 June 1993 |
| 57 | Slovenia | 15 June 1993 |
| 58 | Armenia | 25 August 1993 |
| 59 | Cuba | 6 April 1994 |
| 60 | North Macedonia | 21 February 1995 |
| 61 | Azerbaijan | 5 April 1995 |
| 62 | Panama | 27 September 1996 |
| 63 | Czech Republic | 31 January 1997 |
| 64 | Haiti | 11 June 1997 |
| 65 | Kuwait | 9 July 1998 |
| 66 | Croatia | 15 June 1999 |
| 67 | Slovakia | 21 June 1999 |
| 68 | Turkey | June 1999 |
| 69 | Belarus | 18 May 2000 |
| 70 | Ireland | 19 May 2000 |
| 71 | Bulgaria | 7 June 2001 |
| 72 | Maldives | 25 March 2002 |
| 73 | South Africa | 17 February 2004 |
| 74 | Iceland | 11 March 2004 |
| 75 | Cyprus | 22 July 2004 |
| 76 | Malta | 23 July 2004 |
| 77 | Lithuania | 23 September 2004 |
| 78 | Hungary | 16 May 2005 |
| 79 | Poland | 13 September 2005 |
| 80 | Thailand | 7 July 2006 |
| 81 | Oman | 5 October 2006 |
| 82 | Qatar | 9 October 2006 |
| 83 | Bahrain | 20 October 2006 |
| 84 | Singapore | 12 December 2006 |
| 85 | Saudi Arabia | 12 February 2007 |
| 86 | United Arab Emirates | 4 May 2007 |
| 87 | Morocco | 3 July 2007 |
| 88 | Libya | 31 August 2007 |
| 89 | Luxembourg | 26 September 2007 |
| 90 | Dominican Republic | 5 October 2007 |
| 91 | Kazakhstan | 16 November 2007 |
| 92 | Botswana | 6 December 2007 |
| 93 | Finland | 26 September 2008 |
| 94 | Ecuador | 10 August 2009 |
| — | Sovereign Military Order of Malta | 20 October 2009 |
| 95 | Brunei | 21 December 2009 |
| 96 | Cambodia | 28 April 2010 |
| 97 | Egypt | 7 July 2010 |
| 98 | Philippines | 16 July 2010 |
| 99 | Georgia | 7 April 2011 |
| 100 | Montenegro | 11 April 2011 |
| 101 | Tajikistan | 12 April 2011 |
| 102 | Bosnia and Herzegovina | 1 June 2011 |
| 103 | Andorra | 3 June 2011 |
| 104 | Indonesia | 23 September 2011 |
| 105 | Moldova | 18 November 2011 |
| 106 | Mongolia | 19 June 2013 |
| 107 | Solomon Islands | 11 September 2013 |
| 108 | Vietnam | 8 November 2013 |
| 109 | New Zealand | 6 October 2014 |
| 110 | Ethiopia | 1 November 2014 |
| 111 | Fiji | 20 February 2015 |
| 112 | Iran | 1 October 2015 |
| 113 | Paraguay | 21 September 2016 |
| 114 | Pakistan | 23 September 2016 |
| 115 | Lebanon | April 2017 |
| 116 | Nepal | 25 July 2017 |
| 117 | Jordan | 27 September 2017 |
| – | Cook Islands | 9 November 2017 |
| 118 | Romania | 5 April 2018 |
| 119 | Liechtenstein | 25 September 2018 |
| 120 | Serbia | 28 September 2018 |
| 121 | San Marino | 12 December 2018 |
| 122 | Monaco | 28 February 2019 |
| — | Kosovo | 24 July 2019 |
| 123 | Rwanda | 10 December 2019 |
| 124 | Ghana | Before March 2020 |
| 125 | Kyrgyzstan | 3 June 2021 |
| 126 | Uzbekistan | 13 June 2022 |
| 127 | Kenya | 23 June 2022 |
| 129 | Cape Verde | 22 September 2022 |
| 128 | Benin | 21 December 2023 |
| — | State of Palestine | 14 June 2024 |
| 129 | Seychelles | 23 September 2024 |
| 130 | Marshall Islands | 24 September 2025 |
| 131 | Palau | September 2025 |
| 132 | Sri Lanka | 3 October 2025 |
| 133 | Honduras | 21 June 2026 |
| 134 | Dominica | Unknown |
| 135 | Grenada | Unknown |
| 136 | Saint Vincent and the Grenadines | Unknown |

== Bilateral relations ==
| Country | Formal Relations Began | Notes |
|---|---|---|
| Belize | 4 February 1983 | Antigua & Barbuda and Belize are two of fifteen commonwealth realms, members of: the Association of Caribbean States, the Caribbean Community, the Caribbean Development Bank, the Commonwealth of Nations, ECLAC, EU-CARIFORUM, the Organisation of African, Caribbean and Pacific States, the Organization of American States, and the United Nations. Both countries established diplomatic relations on 4 February 1983. |
| Canada | 1 November 1981 | Antigua & Barbuda and Canada are two of fifteen commonwealth realms, members of: the Commonwealth of Nations, the Organization of American States, and the United Nations. Both countries established diplomatic relations in 1967.: Antigua and Barbuda is accredited to Canada from its embassy in Washington, D.C., United States and has a consulate-general in Toronto.; The Canadian High Commission in Bridgetown, Barbados is accredited to Antigua and Barbuda. |
| China | 1 January 1983 | Main article: Antigua and Barbuda–China relations |
| Denmark | 27 October 1985 | Denmark is represented in Antigua and Barbuda by its Consulate General in New York. |
| India | 2 April 1982 | Main article: Antigua and Barbuda–India relations |
| Ireland | 19 May 2000 | Ireland is represented in Antigua and Barbuda through its embassy in Washington DC, United States. |
| Israel | 22 June 1983 | Israel is represented in Antigua and Barbuda through its embassy in Dominican Republic. |
| Mexico | 14 September 1984 | Main article: Antigua and Barbuda–Mexico relations: Antigua and Barbuda has a non-resident ambassador accredited to Mexico from its capital in St. John's.; Mexico is accredited to Antigua and Barbuda from its embassy in Castries, Saint Lucia and maintains an honorary consulate in St. John's. |
| Turkey | June 1999 | Turkish Embassy in Santo Domingo is accredited to Antigua and Barbuda.; Trade volume between the two countries was 12.5 million USD in 2019. |
| United Kingdom | 1 November 1981 | Main article: Antigua and Barbuda–United Kingdom relations |
| United States | 1 November 1981 | Main article: Antigua and Barbuda–United States relations Relations between Antigua and Barbuda and the United States have been friendly since Antigua and Barbuda's independence from the United Kingdom in 1981. The United States has supported the Government of Antigua and Barbuda's effort to expand its economic base and to improve its citizens' standard of living. However, concerns over the lack of adequate regulation of the financial services sector prompted the U.S. Government to issue a financial advisory for Antigua and Barbuda in 1999. The advisory was lifted in 2001, but the U.S. Government continues to monitor the Government of Antigua and Barbuda's regulation of financial services. The United States also has been active in supporting post-hurricane disaster assistance and rehabilitation through the U.S. Agency for International Development's (USAID) Office of Foreign Disaster Assistance and the Peace Corps. U.S. assistance is primarily channelled through multilateral agencies such as the World Bank and the Caribbean Development Bank (CDB), as well as through the USAID office in Bridgetown, Barbados. Antigua and Barbuda is strategically situated in the Leeward Islands near maritime transport lanes of major importance to the United States. Antigua has long hosted a U.S. military presence. A former U.S. Navy support facility, turned over to the Government of Antigua and Barbuda in 1995, is now being developed as a regional coast guard training facility. Antigua and Barbuda's location close to the U.S. Virgin Islands and Puerto Rico makes it an attractive transshipment point for narcotics traffickers. To address these problems, the United States and Antigua and Barbuda have signed a series of counter-narcotic and counter-crime treaties and agreements, including a maritime law enforcement agreement (1995), subsequently amended to include overflight and order-to-land provisions (1996); a bilateral extradition treaty (1996); and a mutual legal assistance treaty (1996). In addition, Antigua and Barbuda receives counter-narcotics assistance and benefits from U.S. military exercise-related and humanitarian civic assistance construction projects. In 2005, Antigua and Barbuda had 239,804 stay-over visitors, with nearly 28% of Antigua and Barbuda's visitors coming from the United States. It is estimated that 4,500 Americans reside in the country. In 2005, both countries disputed a World Trade Organization ruling over gambling laws. In 2007, relations became strained when Antigua and Barbuda demanded sanctions worth $3.4bn imposed on the United States for its failure to obey the WTO gambling ruling stating that "while we realise this is a significant step for Antigua and Barbuda to take, we feel we have no choice in the matter". |
| Venezuela | 11 June 1982 | Main article: Antigua and Barbuda–Venezuela relations Antigua and Barbuda enjoys close relations with Venezuela. As of June 2009, it became a formal member of the Bolivarian Alliance for the Americas (ALBA) international co-operation organisation and the Caribbean oil alliance Petrocaribe. In 2009, Antigua and Barbuda received US$50 million from Venezuela because of the country's membership of these initiatives. "We have benefited from these relationships and so we will continue to forge these alliances, whether it is with Venezuela, Cuba or whoever else that we feel is in the interest of Antigua and Barbuda and the sub-region," said the Prime Minister of Antigua and Barbuda Baldwin Spencer. |

== See also ==
- West Indies Associated States
- Organisation of Eastern Caribbean States
- List of diplomatic missions in Antigua and Barbuda
- List of diplomatic missions of Antigua and Barbuda
- North American Union
- North American Free Trade Agreement
- Free Trade Area of the Americas
- Third Border Initiative
- Caribbean Community
- Caribbean Basin Initiative (CBI)
- Caribbean Basin Trade Partnership Act
- Western Hemisphere Travel Initiative
- Joseon Cybernation, a non-territorial state recognized by Antigua and Barbuda
