= Dominican embassy =

Dominican embassy may refer to:

- List of diplomatic missions of Dominica
- List of diplomatic missions of the Dominican Republic
