= List of ambassadors of Trinidad and Tobago to China =

Coordinates: 39.951001°N 116.465491°E

Ambassador of Trinidad and Tobago to China
- Incumbent; Analisa Low since 2021
- Inaugural holder: Chandradath Singh
- Formation: March 20, 2014

The Trinidadian and Tobagonian Ambassador in Beijing is the official representative of the Government in Port of Spain to the Government of China.

== List of representatives ==
Diplomatic agreement/Diplomatic accreditation	Ambassador	Observations	List of prime ministers of Trinidad and Tobago	Premier of the People's Republic of China	Term end
February 26, 2014		Embassy in Beijing opened.	Kamla Persad-Bissessar	Li Keqiang	
March 20, 2014	Chandradath Singh	28 July 2011 he was ambassador to Singapore	Keith Rowley	Li Keqiang	June 22, 2016
June 22, 2016	Ayesha Wharton	Chargé d'affaires	Keith Rowley	Li Keqiang	
2018	Stephen Seedansingh		Keith Rowley	Li Keqiang	2020
January 2021	Adrian Thomas	Chargé d'affaires	Keith Rowley	Li Keqiang	November 2021
2021	Analisa Low		Keith Rowley	Li Keqiang	

- China–Trinidad and Tobago relations
