= List of diplomatic missions of Antigua and Barbuda =

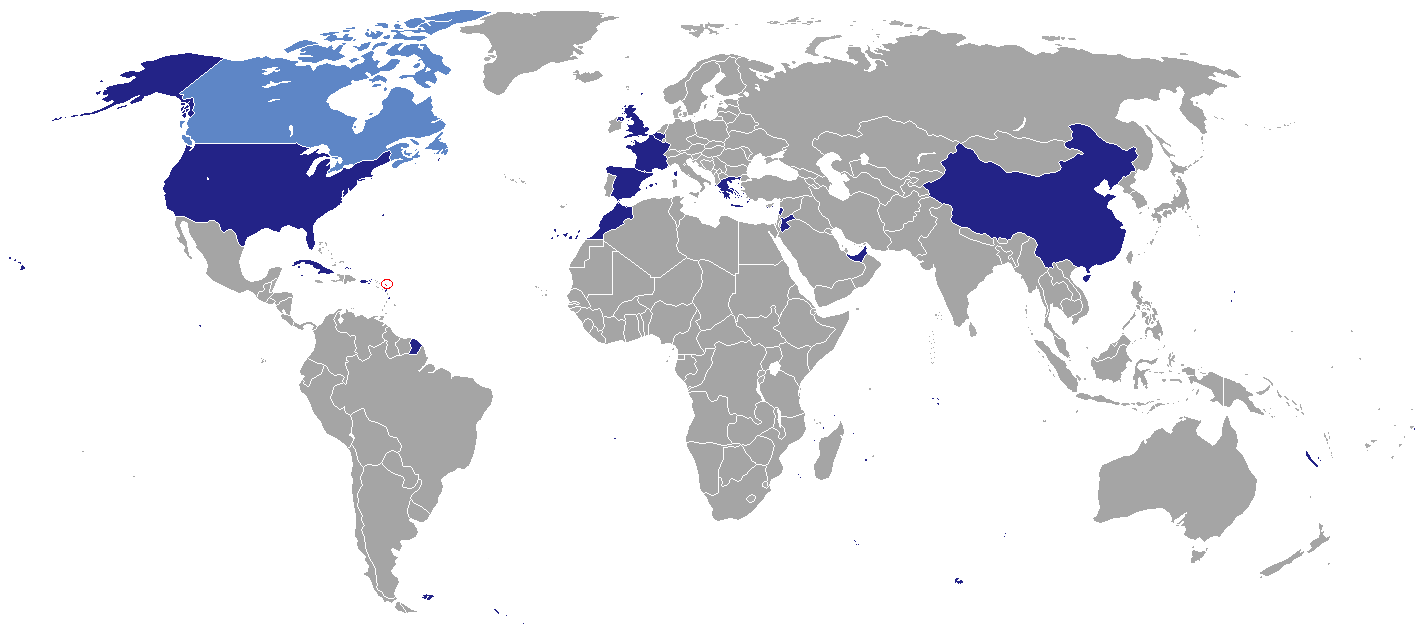
Location of diplomatic missions of Antigua and Barbuda: Antigua and Barbuda Embassy or High Commission Consulate-General

This is a list of diplomatic missions of Antigua and Barbuda. Antigua and Barbuda's diplomatic network does not extend to any neighbouring Caribbean countries. Its embassy and mission to the European Union in Brussels and its embassy in Morocco is shared with other East Caribbean states.

== Current missions ==
=== Africa ===
Host country	Host city	Mission	Concurrent accreditation	Ref.
Morocco	Rabat	Embassy		

=== Americas ===
Host country	Host city	Mission	Concurrent accreditation	Ref.
Canada	Toronto	Consulate-General		
Cuba	Havana	Embassy		
United States	Washington, D.C.	Embassy	Country: Canada; International Organizations: Organization of American States	
United States	Miami	Consulate-General	Country: Canada; International Organizations: Organization of American States	
United States	New York City	Consulate-General	Country: Canada; International Organizations: Organization of American States	

=== Asia ===
Host country	Host city	Mission	Concurrent accreditation	Ref.
China	Beijing	Embassy		
Jordan	Amman	Embassy		
Lebanon	Beirut	Embassy		
United Arab Emirates	Abu Dhabi	Embassy		

=== Europe ===
Host country	Host city	Mission	Concurrent accreditation	Ref.
Belgium	Brussels	Embassy	International Organizations: European Union	
France	Paris	Embassy		
Greece	Athens	Embassy		
Spain	Madrid	Embassy		
United Kingdom	London	High Commission	Countries: Estonia; Germany; Ireland; Lithuania	

=== Multilateral organizations ===
Organization	Host city	Host country	Mission	Concurrent accreditation	Ref.
United Nations	Geneva	Switzerland	Permanent Mission		
United Nations	New York City	United States	Permanent Mission	Countries: Guatemala	

== Mission to open ==
Host country	Host city	Mission	Ref.
Nigeria	Abuja	High Commission	

== Gallery ==
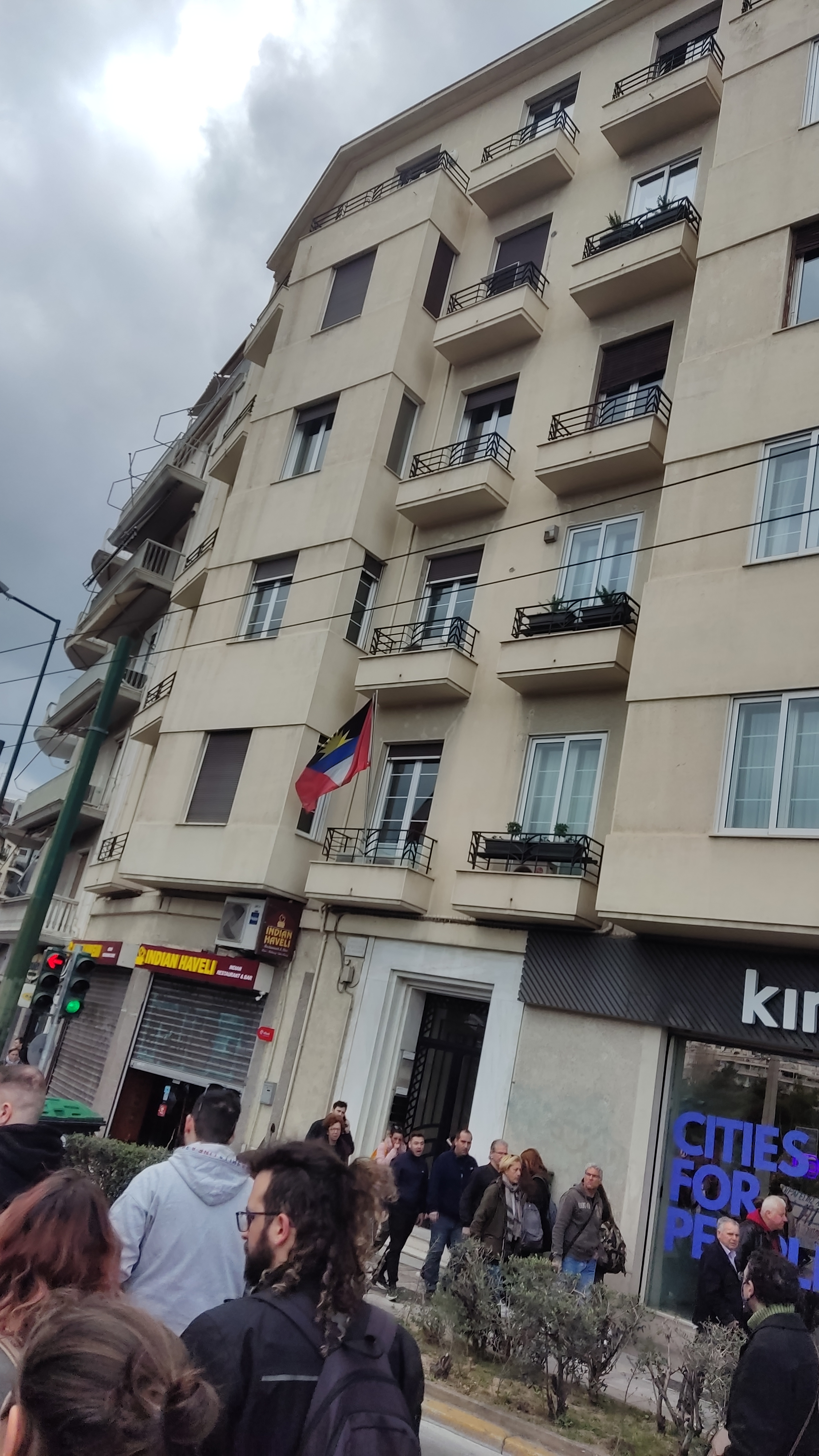
Embassy in Athens

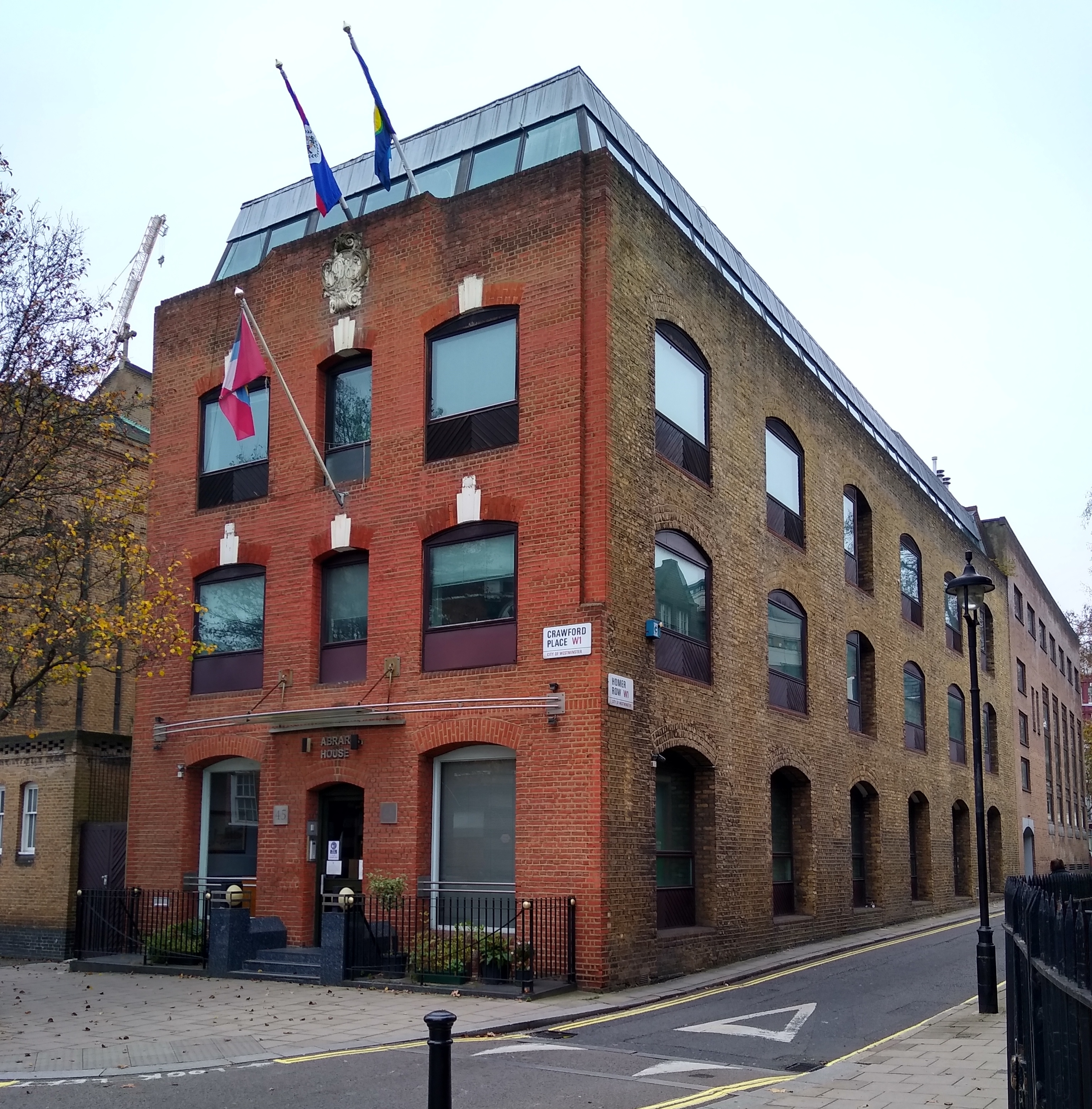
High Commission in London

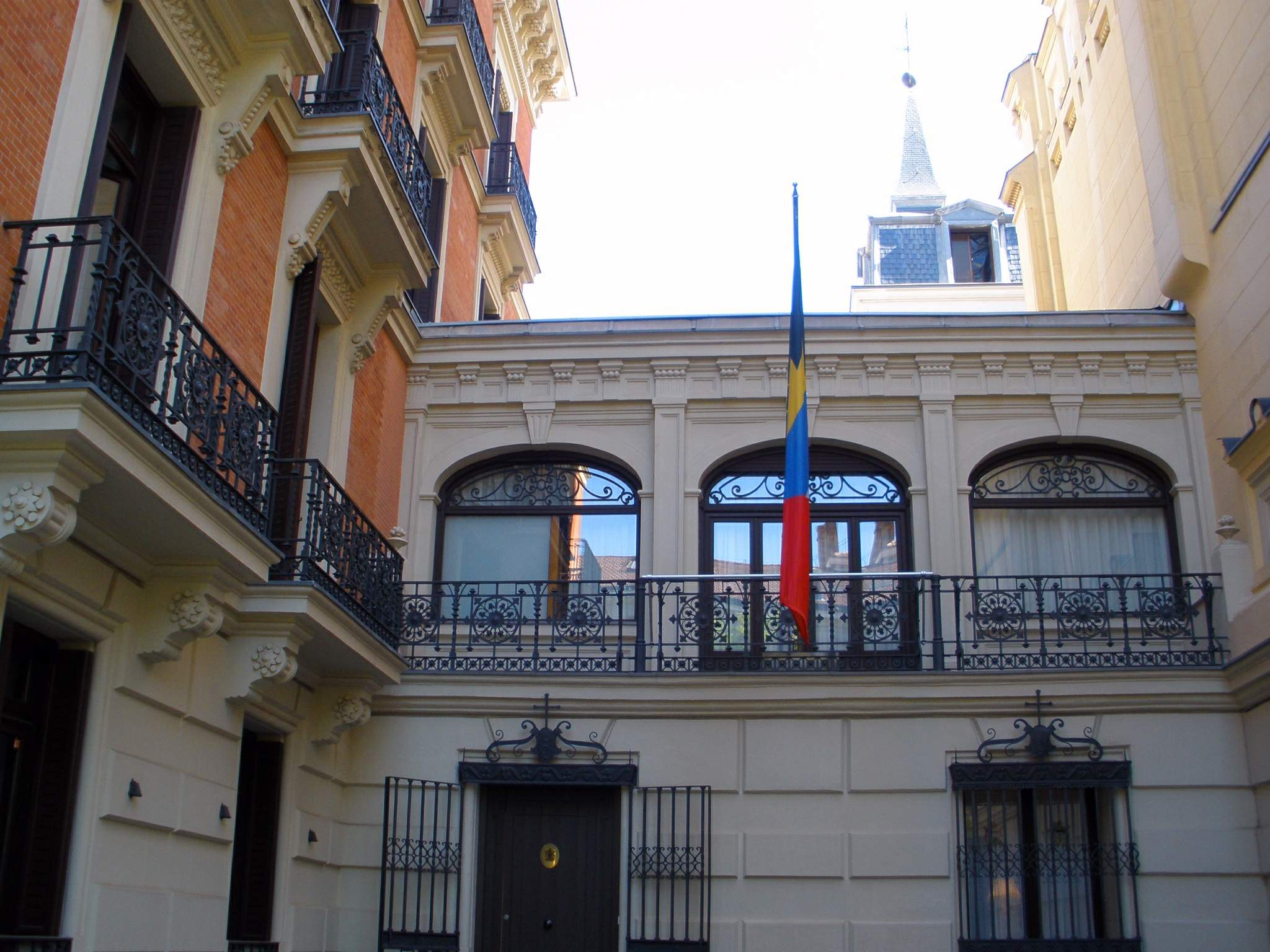
Embassy in Madrid

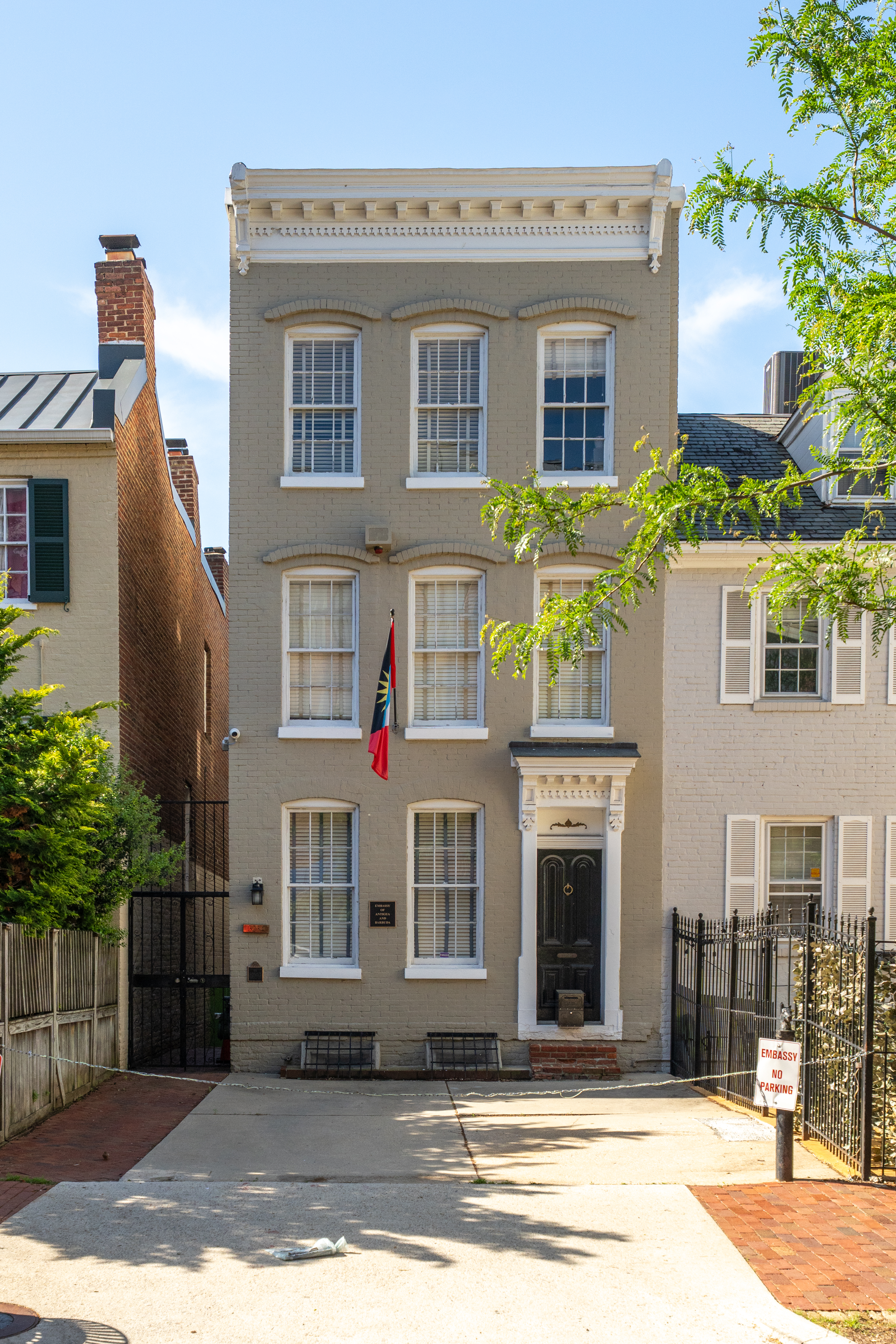
Embassy in Washington, D.C.

== See also ==
- Foreign relations of Antigua and Barbuda
- List of diplomatic missions in Antigua and Barbuda
