= Antigua and Barbuda–Colombia relations =

- Antigua and Barbuda: Colombia

Diplomatic mission
- Embassy of Antigua and Barbuda in Washington D.C. (United States) (Note: Concurrent Embassy.): Embassy of Colombia in Kingston (Jamaica) (Note: Concurrent Embassy.) Honorary Consulate in Saint John

Relations between Antigua and Barbuda and the Republic of Colombia began on 18 March 1982, less than a year after the former's independence from the United Kingdom.

== Programmes ==
The bilateral programmes of these two countries is governed mainly by the Programs of the Colombian Cooperation Strategy in the Greater Caribbean. The programme is aimed at inhabitants of the Caribbean islands who want to strengthen specific issues. With Antigua and Barbuda, cooperation has occurred through topics such as:

- Environment: The issues discussed in the environment between Colombia and Antigua and Barbuda are related to combating oil spills, cooperation in natural disasters, sustainable development, protection of flora and fauna areas.
- Technology and Communication: Freedom of expression through the Constitutive Agreement of Action of National Information Systems. Recently, the island country asked Colombia for help in the construction of road nomenclature. This project is being carried out by the Geographic Institute Agustín Codazzi (GIAC).
- Economy and trade: Antigua and Barbuda and Colombia, together with other Caribbean countries, have signed an agreement to create a sustainable tourism zone.
- Judicial: For these two countries, agreements related to illicit drug trafficking have been of great importance.
- Education: As part of the conclusions of the 6th Summit of the Americas, in Cartagena de Indias, Colombia has begun training teachers to teach the Spanish language in Antigua and Barbuda.
- Status: Antigua and Barbuda visited Colombia to learn about the job evaluation processes for public entity employees.

== Trade ==
In 1994, CARICOM and Colombia signed a free trade agreement aimed at promoting trade and investment, cooperation and the creation of joint ventures.

In 2013, Colombia and Antigua and Barbuda traded US$828,000. This is not significant for Colombia's foreign economy or its GDP. Of those US$828,000, Colombia exported US$611,000, while Antigua and Barbuda exported US$218,000. This left Colombia with a positive trade balance.

In 2022, Colombia exported $3.06M to Antigua and Barbuda. The products exported from Colombia to Antigua and Barbuda included Cement ($1.47M), Raw Sugar ($202k), and Petroleum Coke ($173k). Antigua and Barbuda exported $6.45M to Colombia. The products exported from Antigua and Barbuda to Colombia included Engine Parts ($1.13M), Motor vehicles; parts and accessories (8701 to 8705) ($980k), and Transmissions ($534k).

Trade between Antigua and Barbuda and Colombia
Country	Exports ($USD)	Percentage (exports)	Percentage (imports)	Percentage (total)	Products
Antigua and Barbuda	$218,476	0.09%	0.56%	0.53%	inks and paints, pharmaceutical products, tools, plastic products, electrical appliances, vehicle parts.
Colombia	$611,107	0.00104%	0.00037%	0.0007%	sugars and confectionery, plastic articles, pastries, wood articles, prepared foods, cocoa.

Source: Trade Map

== Diplomatic missions ==
- Colombia has an honorary consulate in St. John's.

== See also ==
- Foreign relations of Antigua and Barbuda
- Foreign relations of Colombia
