= Point, St. John's =

Point
- Neighbourhood
- Location within Antigua and Barbuda
- Coordinates: 17°7′34″N 61°51′3″W
- Country: Antigua and Barbuda
- Parish: Saint John

Population (2001)
  - Total: 1,034
- Time zone: UTC-4 (AST)

Point is a neighbourhood in St. John's, Antigua and Barbuda.

Pelican Court is located in the community.

== Demographics ==
It had a population of 1,034 in 2001.

== Notable people ==
- Gaston Browne (b. 1967) Prime Minister of Antigua and Barbuda (2014-present)
