= China–Haiti relations =

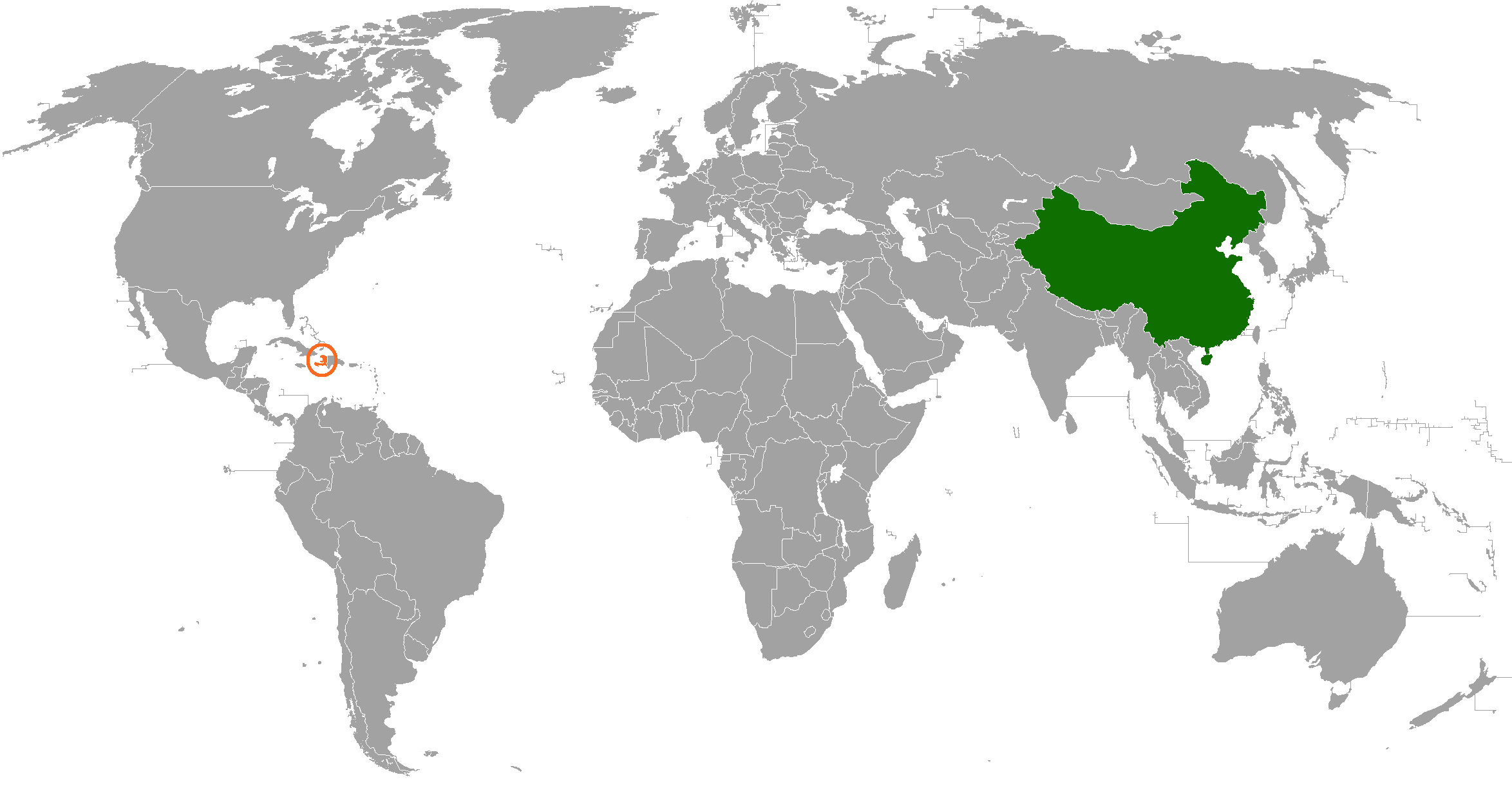

- China: Haiti

The People's Republic of China (PRC) and the Republic of Haiti do not have formal diplomatic relations with each other. Since 1956, Haiti maintains diplomatic relations with the Republic of China (ROC), which is commonly known as Taiwan, leading the PRC to refuse the establishment of doplomatic relations under the one China principle.

Despite not having official ties, China is the second largest exporter to Haiti (as of 2019), and the two countries have trade offices in each other's capitals.

== History ==
Haiti recognized and established diplomatic relations with Taiwan on 25 April 1956. Almost a decade later, on 15 February 1966, the two countries signed the Sino-Haitian Treaty of Amity in the Haitian capital of Port-au-Prince.

In retaliation against Haiti's recognition of Taiwan, China has used its position on the UN Security Council to delay, veto or threaten to veto resolutions concerning assistance to Haiti. For example, in 2021, China did not join a unanimous vote to extend a UN political mission in Haiti until hours before it was due to expire, ostensibly over concerns that an extension of the mission would lead to more instability instead of less. However, diplomats from other countries claimed the Chinese side was angered by Haiti's continued recognition of Taiwan.

Despite China's disapproval of Haiti–Taiwan relations, UN peacekeepers from China have served in Haiti. China also sent rescue workers, construction materials, and US$5 million in financial assistance to Haiti after the 2010 Haiti earthquake.

China has attempted to win Haiti's support by providing humanitarian aid (such as free COVID-19 vaccines in 2021) and offering interest-free loans to the Haitian government. However, in comparison to assistance Taiwan has provided to Haiti, China's investments have been much lower and less diverse. In the late 2000s, financial aid from Taiwan was in the millions of US dollars and made up nearly 20% of Haiti's government budget.

== Trade ==
China is the second largest exporter to Haiti after the United States, making up 25% of Haiti's total imports in 2019.

China has a trade office in Port-au-Prince, and Haiti has one in Beijing.

== See also ==
- Sino-Caribbean relations
- Sino-Latin America relations
