= List of diplomatic missions in Dominica =

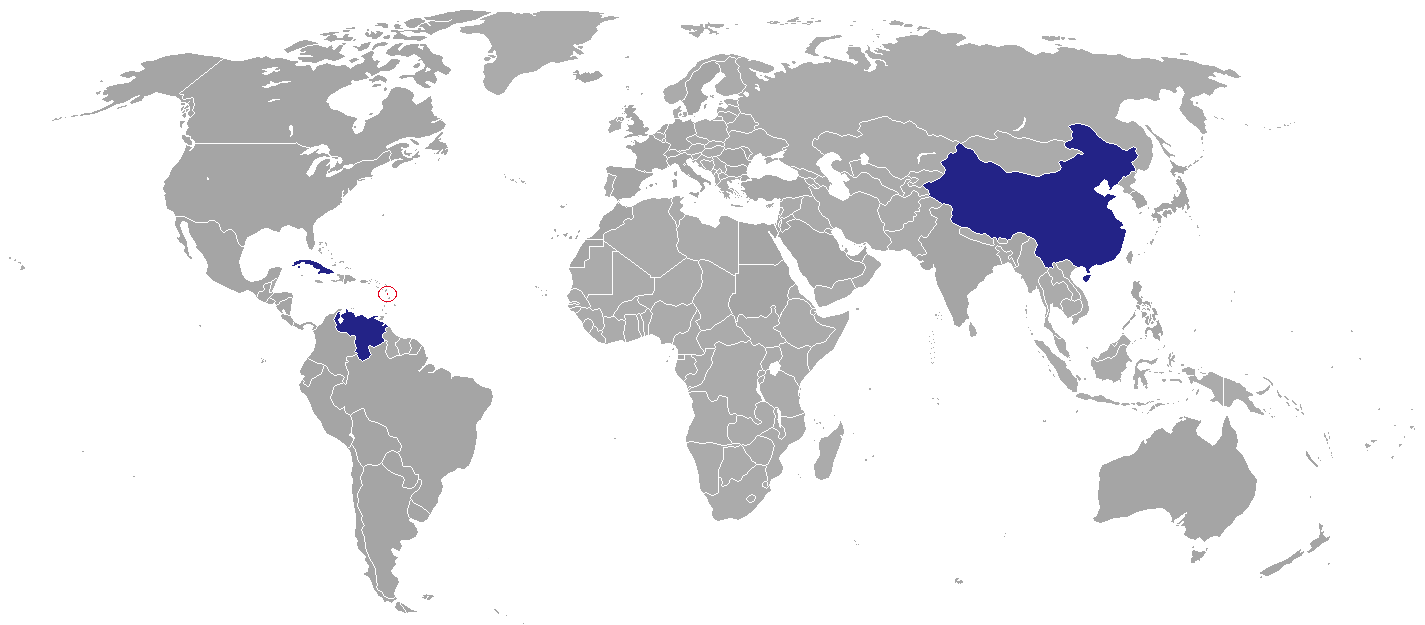
Diplomatic missions in Dominica

This is a list of diplomatic missions in Dominica. The capital Roseau currently hosts 3 embassies. Several other countries have honorary consulates or non-resident ambassadors resident in other Caribbean capitals or elsewhere.

== Embassies ==
Roseau

1. China
2. Cuba
3. Venezuela

== Honorary consulates in Roseau ==
- Belgium
- Canada
- France
- Guyana
- Jamaica
- Japan
- Mexico
- Netherlands
- Spain
- Sweden
- Switzerland
- United Kingdom

== Accredited embassies ==
- Algeria (Caracas)
- Argentina (Kingston)
- Australia (Port of Spain)
- Austria (Bogotá)
- Bahrain (Washington, D.C.)
- Barbados (Bridgetown)
- Belgium (Kingston)
- Brazil (Castries)
- Canada (Bridgetown)
- Chile (Kingston)
- Colombia (Bridgetown)
- Croatia (Washington, D.C.)
- Egypt (Caracas)
- Finland (Caracas)
- France (Castries)
- Germany (Port of Spain)
- Ghana (Port of Spain)
- Guatemala (Port-of-Spain)
- Guinea (Washington, D.C.)
- Haiti (Santo Domingo)
- India (Georgetown)
- Indonesia (Caracas)
- Iceland (New York City)
- Ireland (Havana)
- Israel (Santo Domingo)
- Italy (Caracas)
- Ivory Coast (Washington, D.C.)
- Japan (Port of Spain)
- Jordan (Washington, D.C.)
- Kuwait (Caracas)
- Kenya (Washington, D.C.)
- Kyrgyzstan (Washington, D.C.)
- Laos (Havana)
- Libya (Castries)
- Mali (Washington, D.C.)
- Maldives (New York City)
- Malaysia (Caracas)
- Morocco (Castries)
- Mexico (Castries)
- Netherlands (Port of Spain)
- Norway (Bogotá)
- New Zealand (Bridgetown)
- Philippines (Washington, D.C.)
- Portugal (Bogotá)
- Poland (Bogotá)
- Russia (Kingston)
- Saudi Arabia (Caracas)
- Serbia (Havana)
- Seychelles (New York City)
- Sierra Leone (Washington, D.C.)
- Singapore (Washington D.C.)
- South Africa (Kingston)
- South Korea (Santo Domingo)
- Spain (Kingston)
- Sweden (Stockholm)
- Switzerland (Santo Domingo)
- Sudan (Caracas)
- South Sudan (Washington D.C.)
- Syria (Caracas)
- Thailand (Ottawa)
- Turkmenistan (Washington, D.C.)
- Taiwan (Basseterre)
- Turkey (Santo Domingo)
- Tunisia (Washington, D.C.)
- Tajikistan (Washington, D.C.)
- United Arab Emirates (Bogotá)
- United Kingdom (Bridgetown)
- United States (Bridgetown)
- Uruguay (Caracas)
- Uzbekistan (Washington, D.C.)
- Vietnam (Caracas)
- Yemen (Havana)
- Zambia (Washington, D.C.)
- Zimbabwe (Ottawa)

== See also ==
- Foreign relations of Dominica
- List of diplomatic missions of Dominica
