= Pelican Court =

Apartment complex in St. John's, Antigua and Barbuda

Coordinates: 17°7′29.66″N 61°50′55.55″W

The complex under construction in March 2026

Gaston Browne touring the facility in April 2026

Pelican Court, formerly known as Booby Alley, is an under-construction apartment complex in Point, St. John's, Antigua and Barbuda. It is Chinese-funded and will contain 150 units. In October 2018, the government accepted a Chinese grant to build a housing development here, which locals protested due to fear of displacement. Prior to the development, Booby Alley was a slum with a population of about 300, mostly local African descendants (90%) and Hispanics (10%) from the Dominican Republic.

The slum was cleared in October 2023. All buildings were demolished except for the Bethel Anglican Church and a supermarket. Groundbreaking took place in October 2024. In April 2025, a Chinese worker died at the site. Renamed Pelican Court, the complex is scheduled to open in October 2026, with a planned handover date of 30 October 2026.
