= List of diplomatic missions of Dominica =

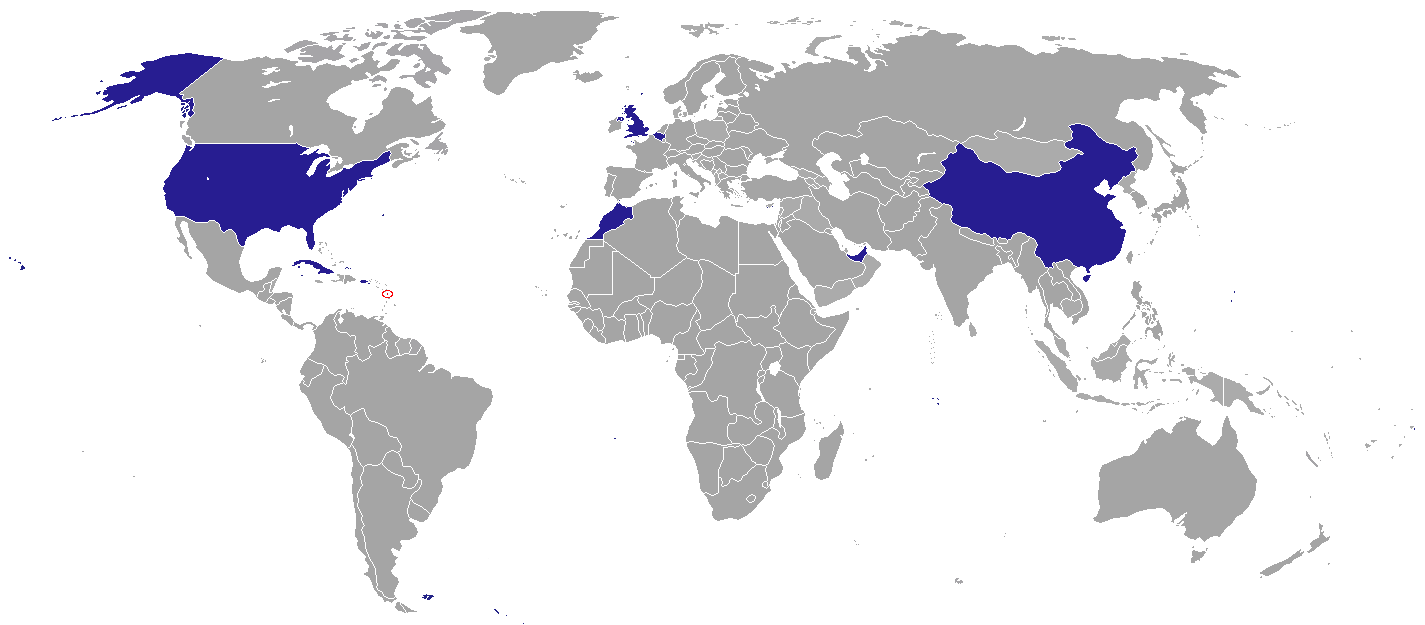
Location of diplomatic missions of Dominica: Dominica Embassy or High Commission

This is a list of diplomatic missions of Dominica, excluding honorary consulates. Dominica's embassy and mission to the European Union in Brussels and its embassy in Morocco are shared with other East Caribbean states.

== Current missions ==
=== Africa ===
Host country	Host city	Mission	Concurrent accreditation	Ref.
Morocco	Rabat	Embassy		

=== Americas ===
Host country	Host city	Mission	Concurrent accreditation	Ref.
Cuba	Havana	Embassy		
United States	Washington, D.C.	Embassy	International Organizations: Organization of American States	
United States	New York City	Consulate-General	International Organizations: Organization of American States	

=== Asia ===
Host country	Host city	Mission	Concurrent accreditation	Ref.
China	Beijing	Embassy		
United Arab Emirates	Abu Dhabi	Embassy		

=== Europe ===
Host country	Host city	Mission	Concurrent accreditation	Ref.
Belgium	Brussels	Embassy	International Organizations: European Union	
United Kingdom	London	High Commission		

=== Multilateral organizations ===
Organization	Host city	Host country	Mission	Concurrent accreditation	Ref.
United Nations	Geneva	Switzerland	Permanent Mission		
United Nations	New York City	United States	Permanent Mission	Countries: Guatemala	

== Gallery ==
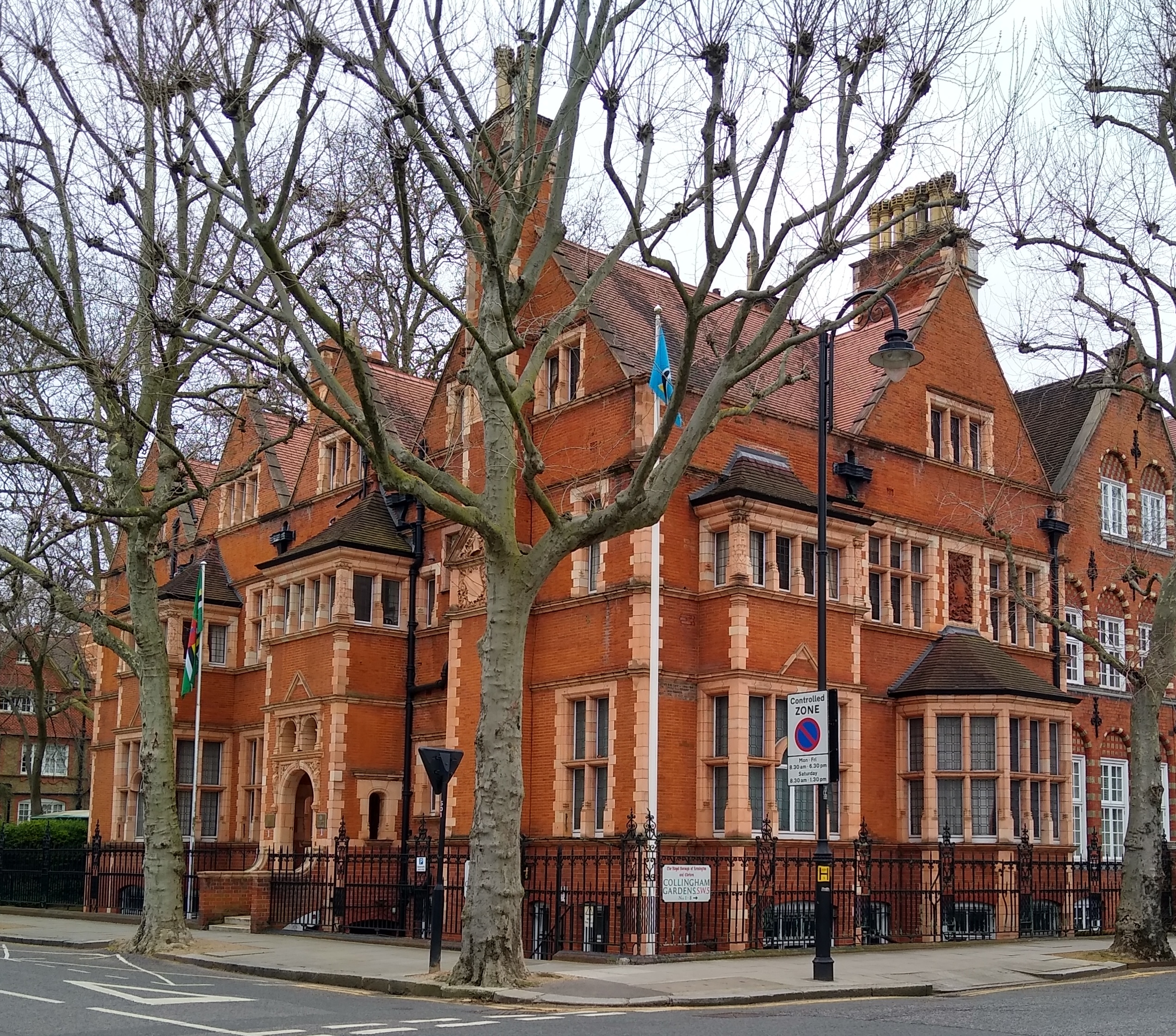
High Commission in London

== See also ==
- Foreign relations of Dominica
- List of diplomatic missions in Dominica
- Visa policy of Dominica
