= Antigua and Barbuda–Venezuela relations =

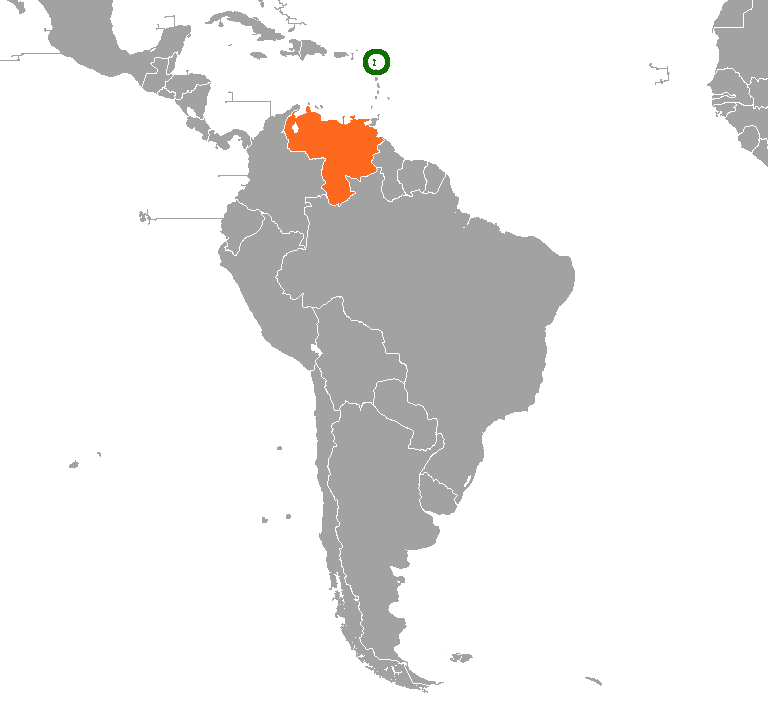
- Antigua and Barbuda: Venezuela

In June 2009 Antigua and Barbuda became a formal member of the Bolivarian Alliance for the Americas (ALBA) international cooperation organization and the Caribbean oil alliance Petrocaribe. In 2009 Antigua and Barbuda received US$50 million from Venezuela. After American billionaire Allen Stanford's banks failed, Chávez sent financial assistance to Antigua and Barbuda, which was dependent on Stanford's investment when his business empire collapsed.
