= China–Saint Kitts and Nevis relations =

- China: Saint Kitts and Nevis

China–Saint Kitts and Nevis relations refers to the bilateral relations between the People's Republic of China and the Federation of Saint Christopher and Nevis. The two countries have never established diplomatic relations.

== History ==
The two countries have never established diplomatic relations. Saint Kitts and Nevis has established diplomatic relations with the Republic of China since 1983, and has maintained such relations to this day. The Embassy of the People's Republic of China in Antigua and Barbuda also handles matters related to Saint Kitts and Nevis.

In 2022, Saint Kitts and Nevis expressed concerns about China's military drills near Taiwan.

== Economic relations ==
According to statistics from the General Administration of Customs of China, the bilateral trade volume in 2023 was US$25.529 million, a year-on-year increase of 69.3%, which was basically Chinese exports.
