= China–Saint Vincent and the Grenadines relations =

- China: Saint Vincent and the Grenadines

China–Saint Vincent and the Grenadines relations refers to the bilateral relations between the People's Republic of China and Saint Vincent and the Grenadines.

== History ==
Saint Vincent and the Grenadines established diplomatic relations with the Republic of China in 1981 and have maintained diplomatic relations ever since. The Embassy of China in Barbados is responsible for matters related to Saint Vincent and the Grenadines.

== Cultural relations ==
St. Vincent and the Grenadines only requires a visa for entry for passports from eight countries, including China.

== See also ==
- Saint Vincent and the Grenadines–Taiwan relations
