= Antigua and Barbuda–China relations =

- Antigua and Barbuda: China

Antigua and Barbuda–China relations refer to bilateral relations between China and Antigua and Barbuda. Antigua and Barbuda has an embassy in Beijing. China has an embassy in St. John's. Diplomatic relations were established on January 1, 1983, less than two years after the Caribbean nation's independence with Vere Bird as the Prime Minister, while Deng Xiaoping was the Chinese leader. Diplomatic relations between the two countries have been smooth since then, as China supported Antigua and Barbuda's bid to join the United Nations.

As of 2002, Chinese exports to Antigua and Barbuda were valued at $1,885,050 while China imported $1,064,950 worth of goods. The current Chinese ambassador to Antigua and Barbuda is Chen Ligang, appointed in 2007, and his counterpart is Ambassador David Shoul.

Antigua and Barbuda joined the Belt and Road Initiative (BRI) in 2018.

Antigua and Barbuda was one of 53 countries that in June 2020 backed the Hong Kong national security law at the United Nations.

China has donated media technology to the Antigua and Barbuda Broadcasting Service.

A number of projects have been undertaken in the country through bilateral investment, including Pelican Court.
