= Dominica–Mexico relations =

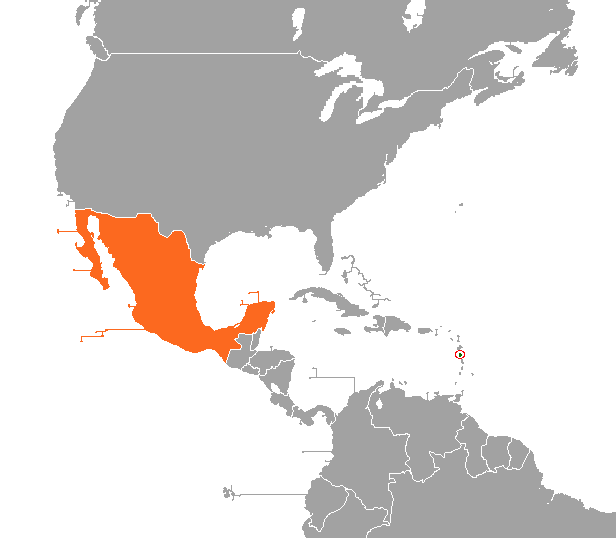

- Dominica: Mexico

The nations of Dominica and Mexico established diplomatic relations in 1979. Both nations are members of the Association of Caribbean States, Community of Latin American and Caribbean States, Organization of American States and the United Nations.

== History ==
Dominica and Mexico established diplomatic relations on 3 April 1979. Since the establishment of diplomatic relations, relations between both nations have taken place primarily in multilateral forums. In February 2010, Dominican Prime Minister Roosevelt Skerrit paid a visit to Cancún to attend the Mexico-Caribbean Community (CARICOM) summit. In May 2014, Dominican Prime Minister Roosevelt Skerrit returned to Mexico to attend the Mexico-Caribbean Community summit in Mérida. During the reunion, both nations signed an Agreement for Cooperation in Development.

In 2014, Mexican Foreign Minister José Antonio Meade paid a visit to Dominica for high-level talks with Dominican officials. That same year, the Mexican government donated US$500 thousand, which were used by the Dominican government for the reconstruction of the sectors that were damaged as a result of the torrential rains that took place in 2013. In August 2015, Dominica suffered heavily from Tropical Storm Erika. As a result, Mexican President Enrique Peña Nieto authorized the donation of US$250 thousand to Dominica. The funds were transferred in April 2016.

In March 2017, Mexico opened an honorary consulate in Roseau. In June 2017, Dominican Foreign Minister Francine Baron paid a visit to Mexico to attend the 47th General Assembly of the Organization of American States in Cancún. In December 2018, Mexico offered to assist with the construction of the Marigot Hospital, that will be funded with US$5 million.

Each year, the Mexican government offers scholarships for nationals of Dominica to study postgraduate studies at Mexican higher education institutions. In 2021, Prime Minister Skerries returned to Mexico to attend the Community of Latin American and Caribbean States summit in Mexico City.

In 2024, both nations celebrated 45 years of diplomatic relations. In October 2024, President Sylvanie Burton travelled to Mexico to attend the inauguration of President Claudia Sheinbaum.

== High-level visits ==
High-level visits from Dominica to Mexico

- Prime Minister Roosevelt Skerrit (2010, 2014, 2021)
- Foreign Minister Francine Baron (2017)
- Foreign Minister Kenneth Darroux (2021)
- President Sylvanie Burton (2024)

High-level visits from Mexico to Dominica

- Foreign Minister José Antonio Meade (2014)

== Trade ==
In 2023, trade between Dominica and Mexico totaled US$44 million. Dominica's main exports to Mexico include: electrical apparatus for electrical circuits, power transformers, screws and bolts, clothing and fruits. Mexico's main exports to Dominica include: motor vehicles, monitors and projectors, prefabricated buildings, iron and steel, vegetable oil and fruits. Mexican multinational company, Cemex operates in Dominica.

== Diplomatic missions ==
- Dominica is accredited to Mexico from its embassy in Washington, D.C., United States.
- Mexico is accredited to Dominica from its embassy in Castries, Saint Lucia and maintains an honorary consulate in Roseau.
