= List of diplomatic missions in Antigua and Barbuda =

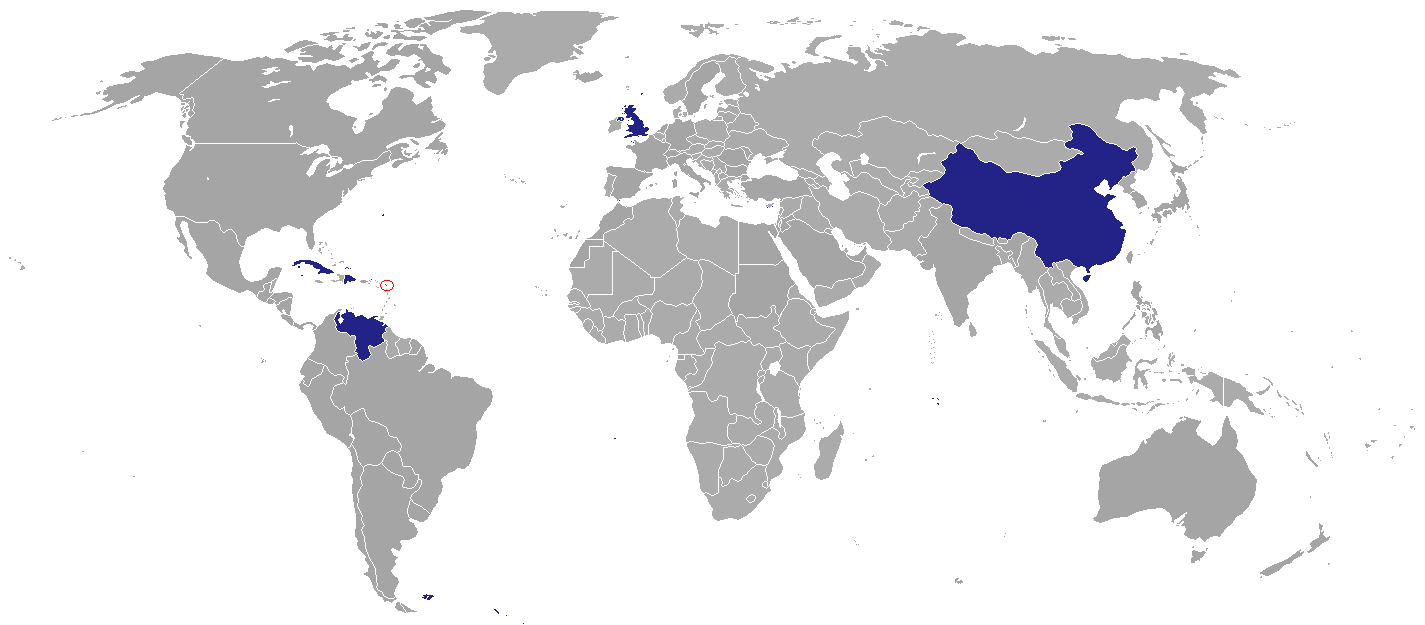
Diplomatic missions in Antigua and Barbuda

St. John's, the capital city of Antigua and Barbuda, hosts five embassies/high commissions. Several other countries have honorary consuls to provide emergency services to their citizens.

== Diplomatic missions in St. John's ==
=== Embassies / high commissions ===
Entries marked with an asterisk (*) are member-states of the Commonwealth of Nations. As such, their embassies are formally termed as "high commissions".

1. China
2. Dominican Republic
3. Cuba
4. United Kingdom*
5. Venezuela

=== Other missions or delegations ===
- United States (Consular agency)

== Non-resident embassies ==
- Algeria (Caracas)
- Argentina (Kingston)
- Australia (Port-of-Spain)
- Austria (Bogotá)
- Bangladesh (Havana)
- Bahrain (Washington, D.C.)
- Brazil (Bridgetown)
- Belgium (Kingston)
- Cote d'Ivoire (Havana)
- Central African Republic (Washington, D.C.)
- Canada (Bridgetown)
- Colombia (Kingston)
- Denmark (Havana)
- Dominica (Roseau)
- Egypt (Havana)
- Finland (Caracas)
- France (Castries)
- Guinea (Washington, D.C.)
- Germany (Port-of-Spain)
- Greece (Caracas)
- Haiti (Santo Domingo)
- Honduras (Havana)
- Iceland (New York City)
- Indonesia (Bogota)
- India (Georgetown)
- Iran (Havana)
- Iraq (Havana)
- Ireland (Washington, D.C.)
- Israel (Santo Domingo)
- Italy (Santo Domingo)
- Japan (Port-of-Spain)
- Jordan (Washington, D.C.)
- Jamaica (Kingston)
- Kenya (Havana)
- Kuwait (New York City)
- Kyrgyzstan (New York City)
- Libya (Havana)
- Lebanon (Havana)
- Mali (Havana)
- Maldives (New York City)
- Mauritius (Washington, D.C.)
- Malaysia (Caracas)
- Mexico (Castries)
- Morocco (Havana)
- Netherlands (Port-of-Spain)
- Norway (Havana)
- New Zealand (Bridgetown)
- North Korea (Havana)
- Oman (Washington, D.C.)
- Pakistan (Havana)
- Portugal (Havana)
- Palau (Washington, D.C.)
- Palestine (Havana)
- Philippines (Washington, D.C.)
- Poland (Bogotá)
- Qatar (Santo Domingo)
- Russia (Kingston)
- Serbia (Havana)
- South Africa (Kingston)
- Sierra Leone (Washington, D.C.)
- Saudi Arabia (Havana)
- Seychelles (New York City)
- South Korea (Santo Domingo)
- Sweden (Stockholm)
- Switzerland (Santo Domingo)
- Sudan (New York City)
- Syria (Havana)
- Senegal (New York City)
- Somalia (New York City)
- South Sudan (New York City)
- Thailand (Ottawa)
- Turkmenistan (Washington, D.C.)
- Taiwan (Basseterre)
- Togo (New York City)
- Turkey (Santo Domingo)
- Tuvalu (New York City)
- Tunisia (Washington, D.C.)
- Tajikistan (Washington, D.C.)
- United States (Bridgetown)
- United Arab Emirates (Havana)
- Uganda (New York City)
- Uzbekistan (Washington, D.C.)
- Vanuatu (New York City)
- Vietnam (Havana)
- Yemen (Havana)
- Zimbabwe (Washington, D.C.)
- Zambia (New York City)

== Honorary consulates in Antigua and Barbuda ==
- Austria
- Barbados
- Canada
- Chile
- Denmark
- Finland
- France
- Germany
- Guyana
- India
- Italy (Vice-consulate)
- Mexico
- Morocco
- Netherlands
- Norway
- Poland
- Portugal
- Saint Kitts and Nevis
- Spain
- South Korea
- Syria
- Switzerland

== See also ==
- Apostolic Nunciature to Antigua and Barbuda
- Foreign relations of Antigua and Barbuda
