= China–Trinidad and Tobago relations =

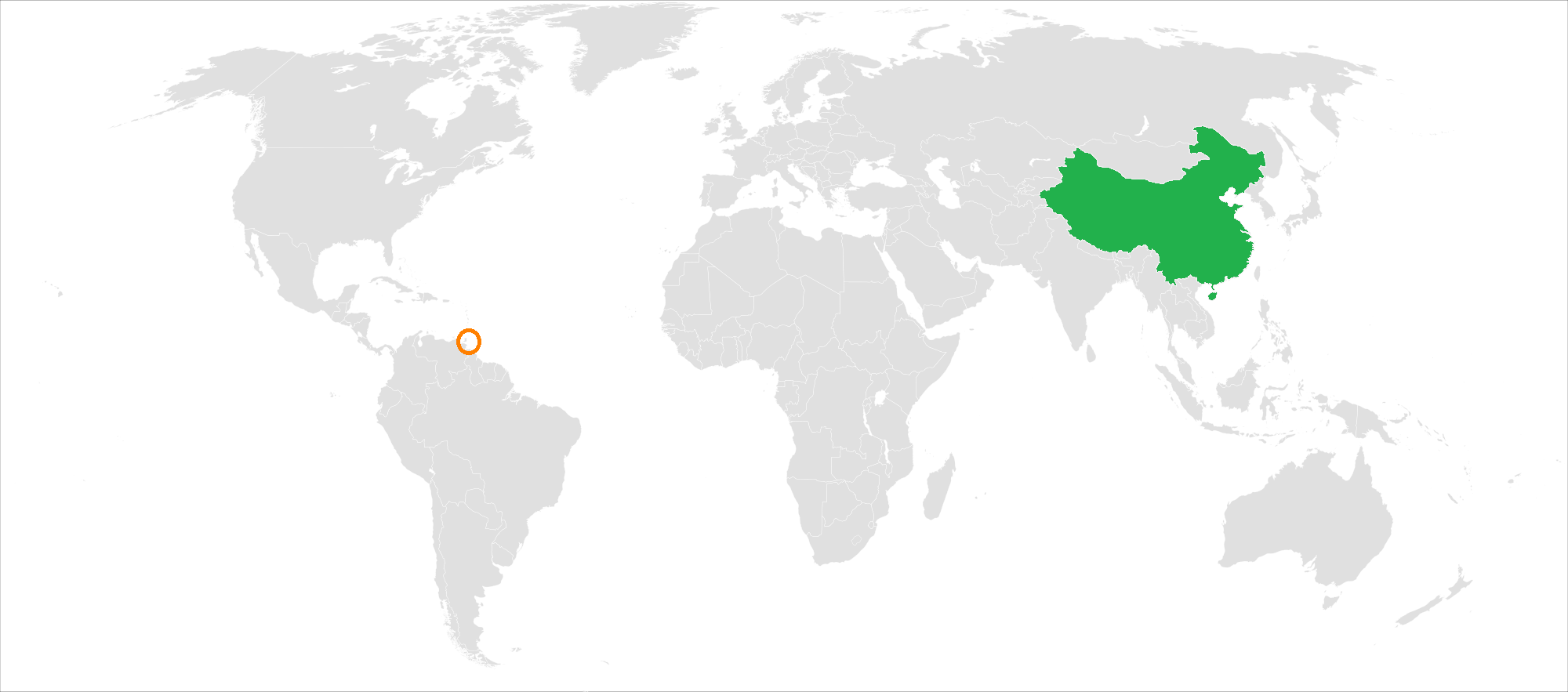

- Trinidad and Tobago: China

Diplomatic mission
- Trinidadian embassy, Beijing: Chinese embassy, Port of Spain

Diplomatic relations between the People's Republic of China and the Republic of Trinidad and Tobago were established on 20 June 1974.

== History ==
After the Black Power Revolution in 1970, Quotations from Chairman Mao Tse-tung was included of banned titles.

Diplomatic relations were established on 20 June 1974. The Chinese government established an embassy in Port of Spain in April 1975, with Trinidad and Tobago establishing their own embassy in Beijing on 26 February 2014. Prime Minister Eric Williams was the first Trinidadian head of government to visit China in 1974. In 2002, the trade balance between the two countries was US$47.15 million, with China exporting all but $4.81 million of that. The current Chinese ambassador to Trinidad and Tobago is Mr. Yang Youming.

China and Trinidad and Tobago share friendly association with the Chinese-based Shanghai Construction Co. having built the Trinidad & Tobago's prime minister's official residence, otherwise known as the Saint Ann's Diplomatic Centre, and the National Academy for the Performing Arts (NAPA), among other developments.

On 26 February 2014, the Republic of Trinidad and Tobago officially opened its embassy in Beijing.

In 2021, Trinidad and Tobago signed a $204 million loan from China Development Bank to bolster its COVID support.

== Economic relations ==
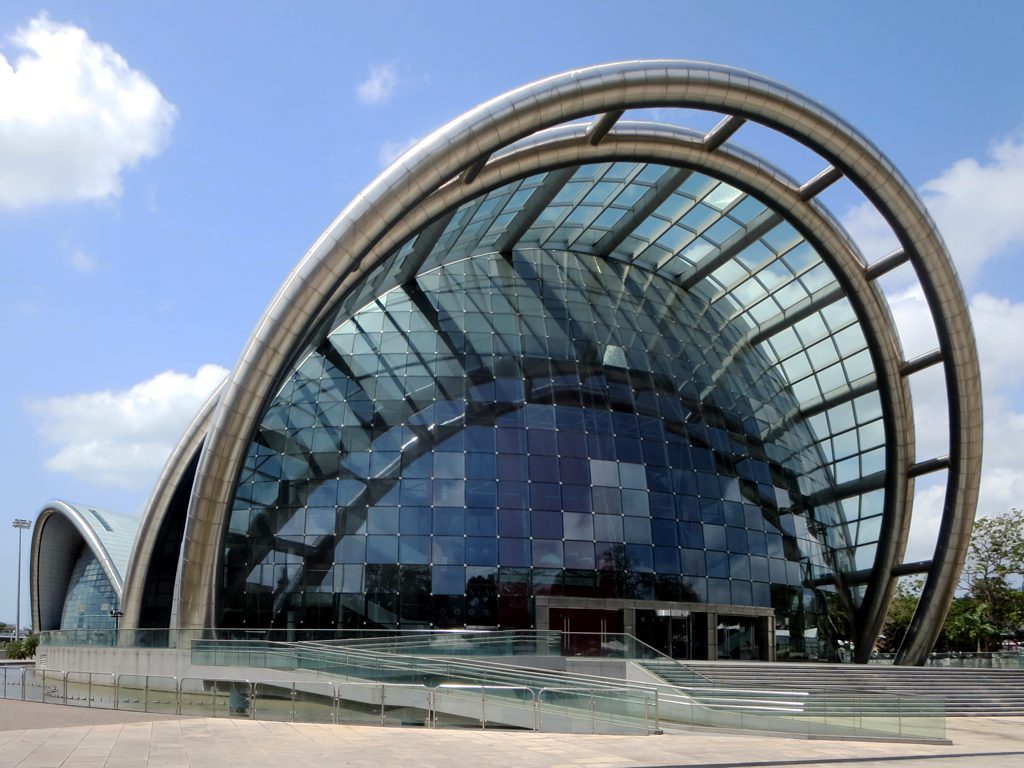
The National Academy for the Performing Arts (NAPA) centre in Port of Spain which was built in 2009 by China Jiangsu International

In the 2000s and 2010s, Trinidad and Tobago approved several major construction projects from China.

Trinidad and Tobago recognizes China's full market economy status. In 2022, the bilateral trade volume between China and Trinidad and Tobago was approximately US$1.3 billion, of which China's imports were US$760 million and exports were US$540 million, up 22.9%, 19.4% and 28.3% year-on-year respectively. China mainly exports steel products, rubber tires, air conditioners, plastic products and furniture, and imports methanol, liquefied natural gas, iron ore, natural asphalt and uncalcined petroleum coke.

In May 2018, the governments of China and Trinidad and Tobago signed a memorandum of understanding on jointly building the Belt and Road Initiative. In that year, the China Harbour Engineering Company signed up to build a $500 million dry dock, though progress has stalled.

Huawei is a major contributor to Trinidad and Tobago's Internet services, providing services to the country's main phone companies, 5G to major urban and industrial areas, and the Ministry of Digital Transformation.

== See also ==
- Foreign relations of China
- Foreign relations of Trinidad and Tobago
- Caribbean–China relations
