= Antigua and Barbuda–Mexico relations =

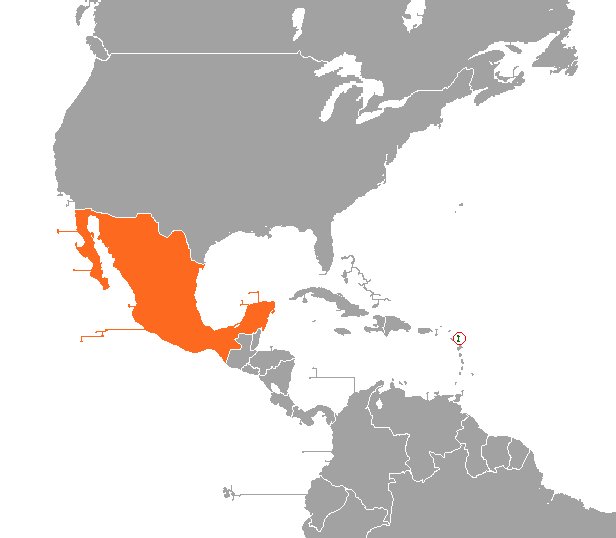

- Antigua and Barbuda: Mexico

The nations of Antigua and Barbuda and Mexico established diplomatic relations in 1984. Both nations are members of the Association of Caribbean States, Community of Latin American and Caribbean States, Organization of American States and the United Nations.

== History ==
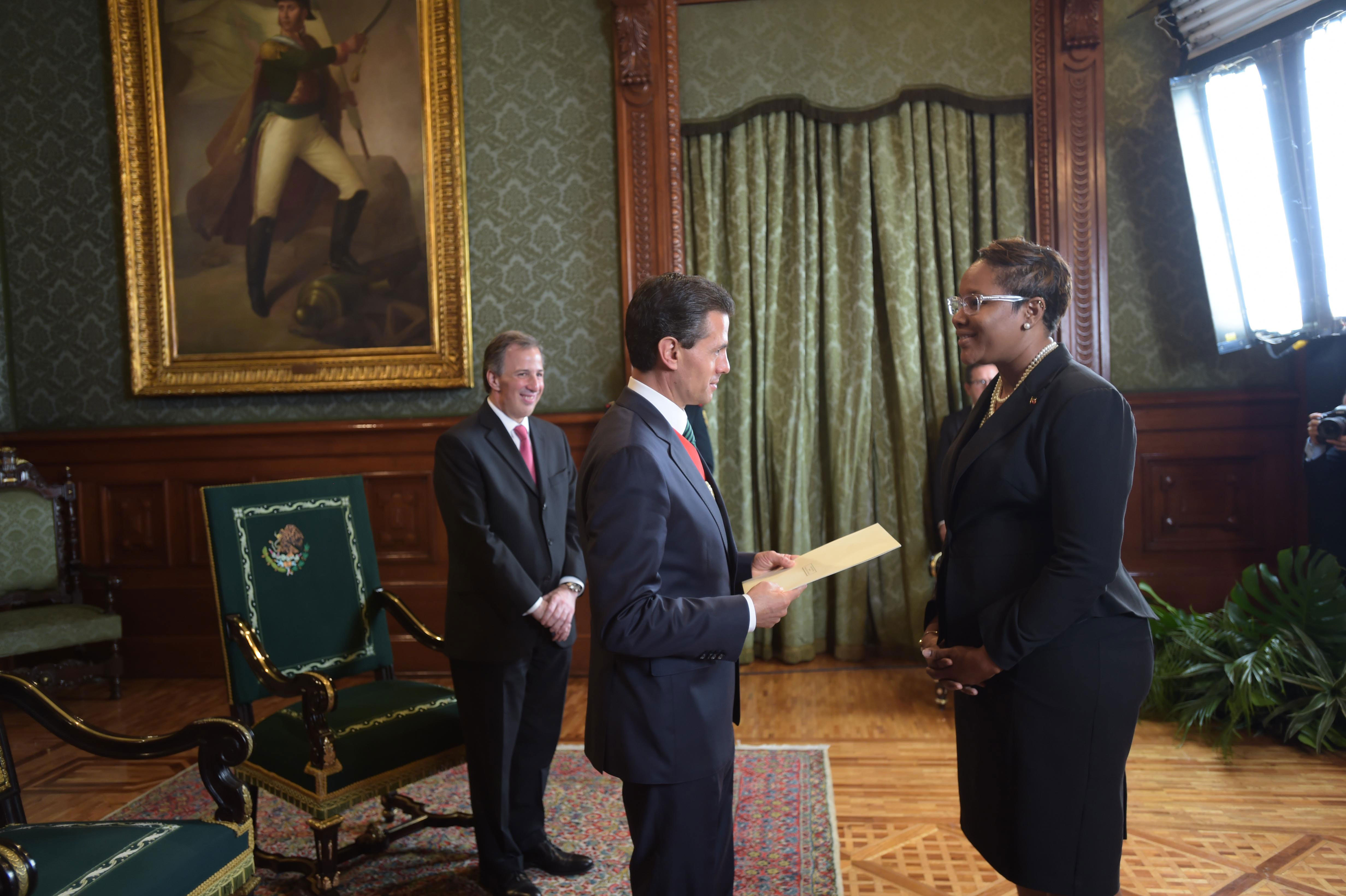
The non-resident ambassador of Antigua and Barbuda, Gail Christian, with the President of Mexico Enrique Peña Nieto in Mexico City, June 2015.

Antigua and Barbuda and Mexico established diplomatic relations on 14 September 1984. Since the establishment of diplomatic relations, relations between both nations have taken place primarily in multilateral forums. In 2004, Antiguan Prime Minister Baldwin Spencer attended the European Union-Latin American and Caribbean Summit in Guadalajara, Mexico. In February 2010, Antiguan Prime Minister Baldwin Spencer returned to Mexico to attend the Mexico-Caribbean Community (CARICOM) summit in Cancún.

In 2014, the Mexican government donated US$5 million to construct affordable homes in Antigua and Barbuda. In May 2016, Antiguan Prime Minister Gaston Browne attended the United Nations Economic Commission for Latin America and the Caribbean held in Mexico City. In 2017, Mexico opened an honorary consulate in St. John's.

In January 2021, the Mexican government donated two mechanical ventilators made in Mexico to Antigua and Barbuda in order to aid the fight against COVID-19. Operators and technicians from Antigua and Barbuda were trained by Mexican specialists on how to operate the machines.

In 2024, both nations celebrated 40 years of diplomatic relations.

== High-level visits ==
High-level visits from Antigua and Barbuda to Mexico

- Prime Minister Baldwin Spencer (2004, 2010)
- Prime Minister Gaston Browne (2016)
- Foreign Minister Paul Chet Greene (2020, 2021)

== Bilateral agreements ==
Both nations have signed a few bilateral agreements such as an Agreement for Technical and Scientific Cooperation (1995) and a Memorandum of understanding between the Mexican Secretariat of National Defense and the Secretariat of the Navy and the Antigua and Barbuda Defence Force on Training and Exchange of Experiences in Security and Defense Matters (2021). Each year, the Mexican government offers scholarships for nationals of Antigua and Barbuda to pursue postgraduate studies at Mexican higher education institutions.

== Trade ==
In 2023, trade between Antigua and Barbuda and Mexico totaled US$8.7 million. Antigua and Barbuda's main exports to Mexico include: electronic integrated circuits, aluminum pipe fittings, machinery parts, and chemical-based products. Mexico's main exports to Antigua and Barbuda include: structure and parts for buildings and bridges; cement, concrete and artificial stone; household electronics; chemical-based products; and motor vehicles. Mexican multinational company Cemex operates in Antigua and Barbuda.

== Diplomatic missions ==
- Antigua and Barbuda has a non-resident ambassador accredited to Mexico from its capital in St. John's.
- Mexico is accredited to Antigua and Barbuda from its embassy in Castries, Saint Lucia and maintains an honorary consulate in St. John's.
