= China–Saint Lucia relations =

- China: Saint Lucia

China–Saint Lucia relations refers to the bilateral relations between the People's Republic of China and Saint Lucia. As of 2025, no formal diplomatic relations exist between the two countries.

== History ==
The two countries established diplomatic relations on September 1, 1997. On April 30, 2007, Saint Lucia announced the establishment of diplomatic relations with the Republic of China, and the People's Republic of China severed diplomatic relations with it on May 5. Currently, the People's Republic of China's affairs related to Saint Lucia are also handled by the Embassy of the People's Republic of China in Barbados.

== Economic relations ==
In September 2019, the foreign ministers of the China-CELAC “Quartet” held their seventh dialogue during the general debate of the UN General Assembly. The then rotating chair of the Caribbean Community, Saint Lucia, attended the dialogue with its Minister of Foreign Affairs Frederick Beaubron.
