= China–Dominican Republic relations =

- China: Dominican Republic

Diplomatic relations between the People’s Republic of China and the Dominican Republic were established in 1932. Following the Chinese Civil War in 1949, relations were maintained in Taiwan and the other islands. After breaking off relations with the Republic of China (Taiwan) on April 30, 2018, the Dominican Republic established diplomatic relations with the mainland government of the People's Republic of China.

== History ==
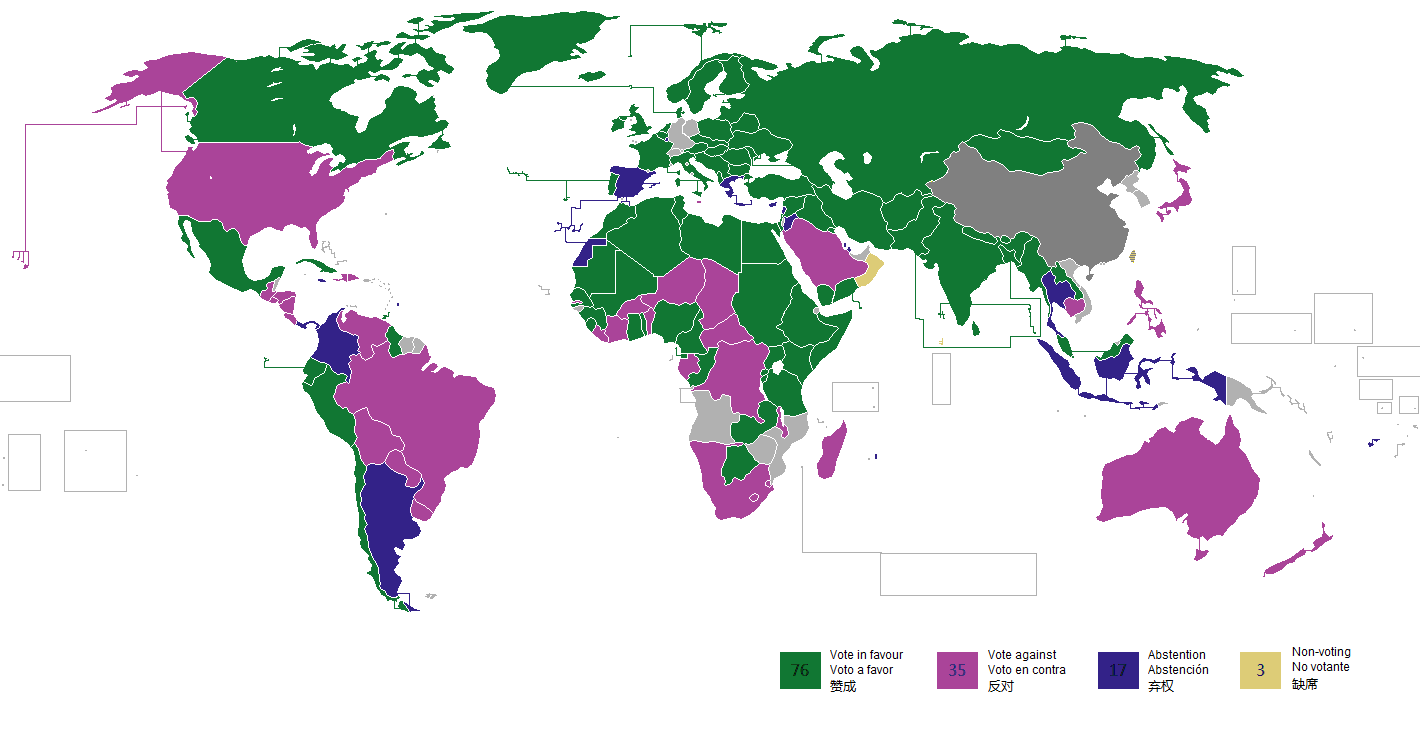
Dominican Republic rejected the vote in the Chinese seat change in the United Nations

=== 1940s to 2010s ===
In 1932, the Chinese envoy to Cuba visited the Dominican Republic, the two countries began to negotiate a treaty of friendship. The two countries formally signed a treaty of friendship on May 11, 1940. On April 9, 1941, the two countries established diplomatic relations.

On July 13, 1943, the Nationalist Government of the Republic of China set up a mission in Santo Domingo, capital of the Dominican Republic. The Chinese envoy to Cuba concurrently served as the Chinese envoy to Dominican Republic. By October 1946, the Dominican Republic set up a mission in Nanking. Following the Chinese Civil War, the Nationalist Government was forced to relocate to Taiwan. On March 8, 1953, the mission was relocated to Taipei.

Following the United Nations General Assembly Resolution 2758, the Dominican Republic maintained relations with the Chinese Nationalist government despite losing its United Nations seat.

=== Relations with People's Republic of China ===
On May 1, 2018, the People's Republic of China, now ruling the Mainland China since 1949 and the Dominican Republic established diplomatic relations, after the Dominican Republic cut diplomatic ties with the Republic of China (Taiwan). Chinese Foreign Minister Wang Yi and Dominican Foreign Minister Miguel Vargas Maldonado attended the signing ceremony in Diaoyutai State Guesthouse in Beijing.

Some Dominicans were angry about the Chinese ambassador's perceived meddling in internal political affairs when he spoke out against a Dominican senator who were critical of the then-ruling government under Danilo Medina for being too friendly with China.

Dominican Republic joined the Belt and Road Initiative (BRI) in 2019.
