= Dominica–India relations =

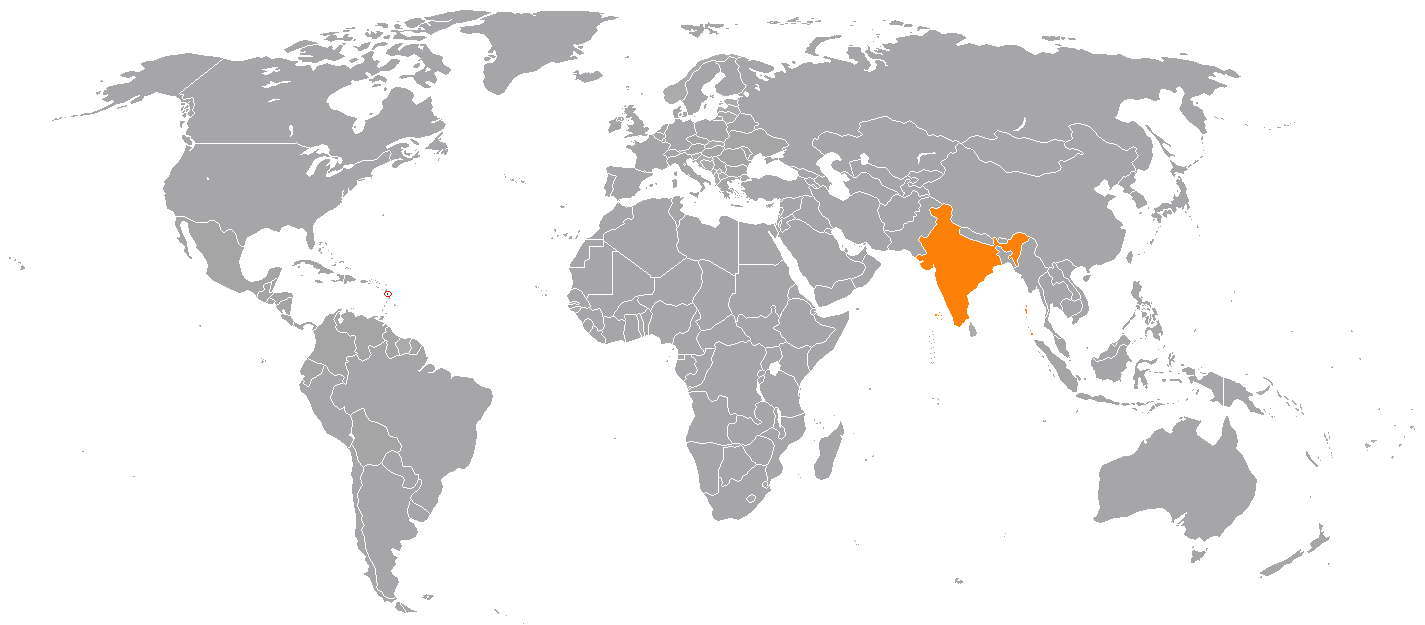

- Dominica: India

Dominica–India relations refers to the international relations that exist between Dominica and India, both republics in the Commonwealth of Nations. The High Commission of India in Port of Spain, Trinidad and Tobago is concurrently accredited to Dominica. Neither country hosts a resident diplomatic mission of the other.

== History ==
Dominica and India established diplomatic relations in 1981.

India's Department of Agricultural Research and Education (DARE) and Dominica's Division of Agriculture signed an MoU for cooperation in education and research in agriculture and allied areas in October 2011. Some Dominican and Indian media outlets reported in November 2011, that Dawood Ibrahim had obtained a Dominican passport. On 13 November 2011, Dominican Prime Minister Roosevelt Skerrit officially denied the reports stating that the government had conducted "an extensive search into the matter and there is no evidence to match the claim." He further accused Dominican economist Thompson Fontaine of being the origin of the false reports.

Dominican Prime Minister Roosevelt Skerrit made a private visit to India on 22–26 February 2016. He was the chief guest at the 6th Convocation of the Lovely Professional University in Jalandhar. During the ceremony, the University conferred its "Honoris Causa" Doctor of Letters degree upon Skerrit. Skerrit visited the Golden Temple in Amritsar on 22 February. He also attended several lunches and dinners held in his honour by members of the Indian business community. The Minister of State (VK) hosted a lunch for Skerrit in Delhi on 25 February.

India established an IT Centre for Excellence at a cost of US$7 million at the Dominica State College in Roseau. The Centre was officially inaugurated by Prime Minister Skerrit on 3 June 2016. At the inauguration ceremony, Skerrit pledged to use Dominica's upcoming term as CARICOM chair beginning 1 July 2016 to strengthen relations between CARICOM and India. Referring to India as "a dear partner and friend" that is helping in the development of Dominica, Skerrit added, "I say to you we shall always be grateful for the generosity of India and to say to you that India can rely on Dominica to stand with it on many international matters of mutual interests."

== Trade ==
Bilateral trade between Dominica and India totalled US$1.57 million in 2015-16. India exported $1.47 million worth of goods to Dominica, and imported $100,000. The main commodities exported by India to Dominica are pharmaceutical products, jewellery, readymade garments, textiles and home furnishings. The major commodities imported by India from Dominica are scrap metals and plastic articles.

Gujarat Apollo Industries Company Ltd. built an asphalt separation plant in Dominica.

Dominica established an Indo-Dominica Chamber of Commerce in February 2016 with aim of facilitate bilateral trade, commerce, tourism and industrial relations.

== Cultural relations ==
As of December 2016, around 50 persons of Indian origin reside in Dominica. There are also a few families of Indian nationals in the country. Dominica's Indian population is of Sindhi origin and are engaged in business, or work as professionals and faculty members at the Ross Medical University.

== Development assistance ==
India donated $100,000 towards disaster relief in the aftermath of Hurricane Ophelia in December 2011, $300,000 in the aftermath of flash floods in Dominica in December 2013, and $200,000 as humanitarian assistance to provide relief in the wake of Tropical Storm Erica on 24 December 2013.

An agriculture and horticulture expert from the National Research Centre for Banana in Thiruchirapalli visited the country for a month in January 2011, at the request of the Dominican Government to advise them on horticulture. The Governments of the two countries signed an MoU in October 2011, agreeing to establish an IT Centre for Excellence in Dominica with Indian assistance. The Centre was built at a cost of $7 million and was officially inaugurated at the Dominica State College, Roseau by Prime Minister Skerrit on 3 June 2016. The Centre is operated by Indian nationals.

At the request of the Dominican Government, India approved a grant-in-aid scheme to supply medicines to public hospitals in the country. Several consignments of medicines have been shipped to Dominica under the scheme.

Citizens of Dominica are eligible for scholarships under the Indian Technical and Economic Cooperation Programme. The most popular ITEC courses among Dominicans are IT, accounts and financial management, human resource development, and SME.

Dominican Prime Minister Skerrit donated ₹15 lakh (US$16,000) to the Pingalwara Charitable Society at Manawala, during his visit to India on 22 February 2016.
