= China–Dominica relations =

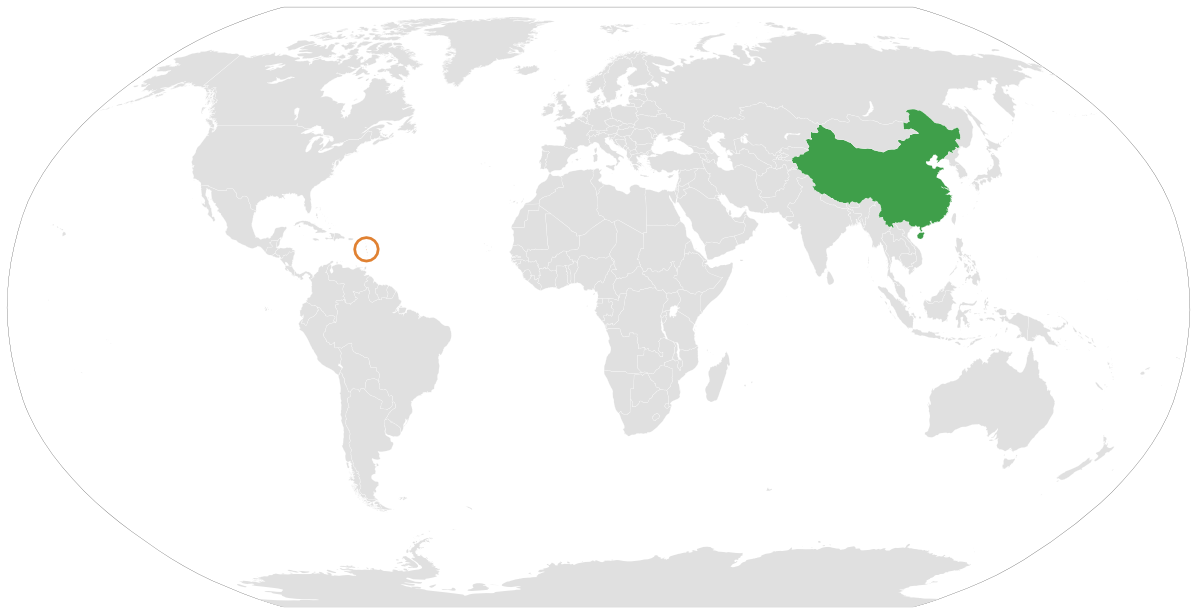

- China: Dominica

Diplomatic mission
- Dominican Embassy, Beijing: Chinese Embassy, Roseau

China–Dominica relations refers to the bilateral relations between China and Dominica.

== History ==
The two countries established diplomatic relations on March 23, 2004, when Dominica suspended ties with the Republic of China (Taiwan). Dominica and Taiwan had established ties since 10 May 1983.

Chinese officials who have visited the United Nations include: Vice Foreign Minister Yang Jiechi (2006), Vice Chairman of the Standing Committee of the National People's Congress Gu Xiulian (2007), Head of the International Department of the Chinese Communist Party Wang Jiarui (2009), Vice Chairman of the Standing Committee of the National People's Congress Chen Changzhi (2012), and Assistant Foreign Minister Hua Chunying (2023).

Dominican officials who have visited China include: Prime Minister Skerrit (official visit in 2005; informal visits in 2004, 2007, 2008, 2013, 2014, 2015, 2016, 2017, 2018, 2019), President Liverpool (informal visits in 2006, 2008, 2010), Speaker Knights (2006), Foreign Minister Savarin (attended the Second China-Caribbean Economic and Trade Cooperation Forum in 2007), Foreign Minister Barron (attended the First Ministerial Meeting of the China-Latin America Forum in 2015, and the Seventh Consultation between the Foreign Ministries of China and Caribbean Countries Having Diplomatic Relations with the Caribbean in 2019), Dominica Labour Party Chairman Sairang (attended the First Meeting of the China-Latin America Political Parties Forum in 2015), and Foreign Minister Henderson (visited China and attended the 2023 Annual Meeting of the Boao Forum for Asia in 2023).

== Economic relations ==
On March 23, 2004, the People's Republic of China and the Commonwealth of Dominica officially established diplomatic relations at the ambassadorial level, marking the start of bilateral cooperation.

Since then, China and Dominica have expanded collaboration across multiple sectors including infrastructure, healthcare, agriculture, and education. In 2018, both countries signed a Memorandum of Understanding on jointly advancing the Belt and Road Initiative (BRI).

China has also played a significant role in Dominica's disaster recovery efforts. Following Hurricane Maria in 2017, China provided major assistance, including the construction of an international airport and the reconstruction of six primary schools. Other initiatives included healthcare improvements, agricultural modernization, and the restoration of cultural sites.

In 2024, China and Dominica commemorated the 20th anniversary of their diplomatic ties, emphasizing strong political trust and increasingly fruitful cooperation.

In 2011, the bilateral trade volume between China and Dominica totaled US$26.885 million. China's exports amounted to US$26.49 million, while its imports were US$396,000. China's main exports included electromechanical products, textiles, clothing, and footwear, while its main imports consisted of scrap aluminum, medical instruments, and equipment.

== Cultural relations ==
Dominica is listed as a destination for Chinese citizens. In 2014, Dominica unilaterally allowed Chinese citizens holding ordinary passports to enter the country for 21 days without a visa. In 2021, the two countries signed a mutual visa exemption agreement in Roseau, Dominica, allowing Dominican citizens to enter China without a visa. Before establishing diplomatic relations, China's affairs with Dominica were managed by the Chinese Embassy in Barbados.
