= Israel–United Kingdom Free Trade Agreement =

Proposed free trade agreement between Israel and the United Kingdom

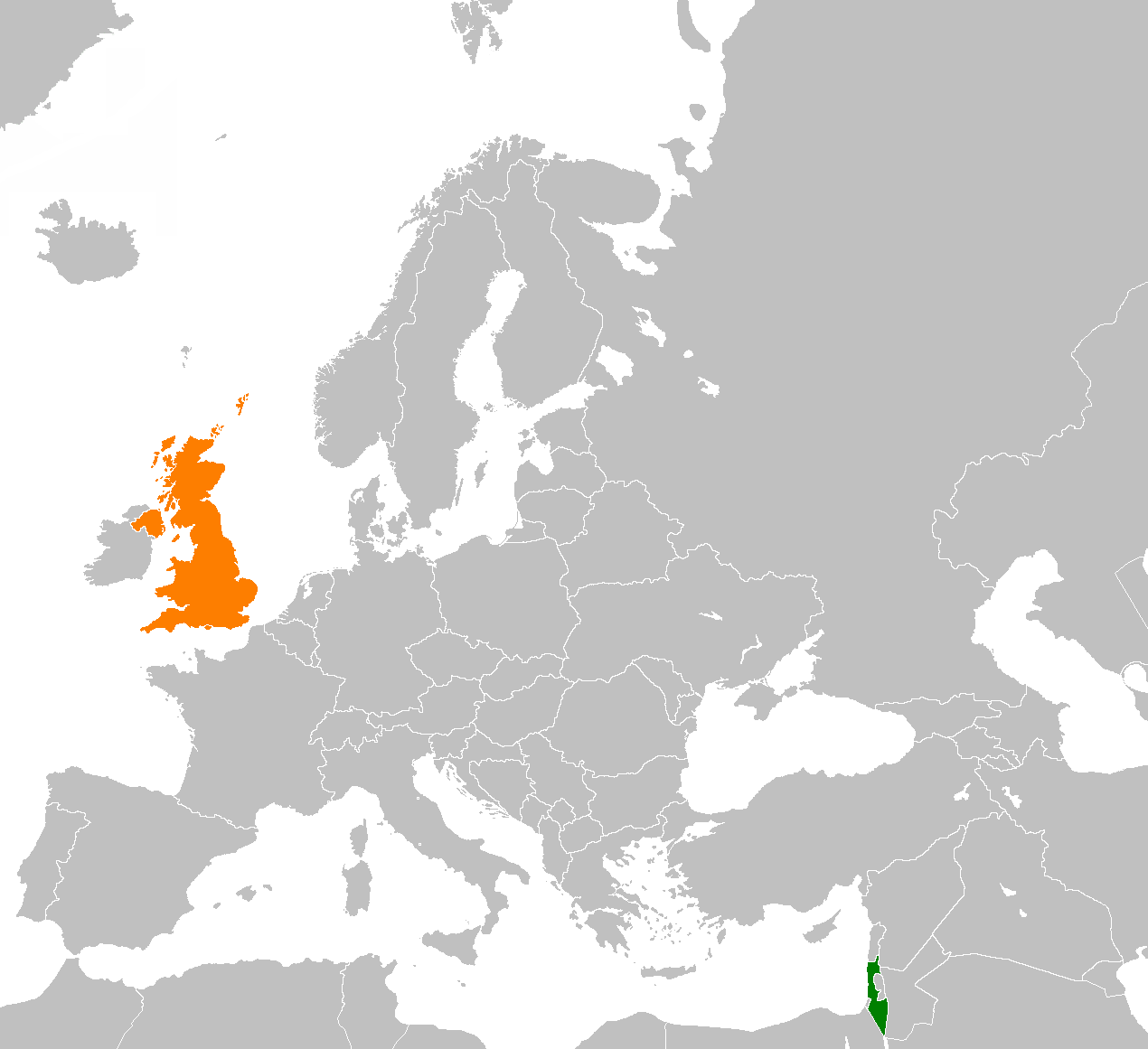
- Israel United Kingdom
- Type: Free Trade Agreement and Economic Integration Agreement
- Context: Trade agreement between Israel and the United Kingdom
- Negotiators: (Israel) Israeli Economy Ministers: Orna Barbivai (until 29 December 2022); Nir Barkat (until 20 May 2025, suspended); (United Kingdom) British Trade Ministers: Anne-Marie Trevelyan (until 6 September 2022); Kemi Badenoch (until 5 July 2024); Jonathan Reynolds (until 20 May 2025, suspended)
- Parties: Israel; United Kingdom
- Languages: English; Hebrew

The Israel–United Kingdom free trade agreement is a proposed free trade agreement which began negotiations on 20 July 2022. The trade agreement would be the third FTA to cover Israel–UK trade, and superseding the Israel–UK Trade Continuity Agreement, extending the deal to cover services and digital trade. Trade value between Israel and the United Kingdom was worth £6,881 million in 2022.

On 20 May 2025, the United Kingdom suspended free trade negotiations due to the Israeli military expansion in Gaza; Foreign Secretary David Lammy announced the suspension in the House of Commons where he stated said events in Gaza were damaging Britain's relationship with Israel.

== History ==
From 1 June 2000 until 30 December 2020, trade between Israel and the UK was governed by the Israel–European Union Association Agreement, while the United Kingdom was a member of the European Union. Following the withdrawal of the United Kingdom from the European Union, the UK and Israel signed a continuity trade agreement on 18 February 2019, based on the EU free trade agreement; the agreement entered into force on 1 January 2021.

== Negotiations ==
Israel and the United Kingdom formally launched negotiations for the new free trade agreement on 20 July 2022.

IUKFTA Round of Negotiations
Round	Dates	Location	Ref.
1	12–20 September 2022	Jerusalem	
2	9–17 March 2023	London	
3	23–27 July 2023	Jerusalem	
4	19–29 February 2024	Virtual meeting	
5	8–17 April 2024	London	

The UK and Israel concluded the fourth round of negotiations on 29 February 2024.

The fifth round of negotiations highlighted that trade in services comprise around 80% of both the UK and Israel's economies, yet services only make up just over one third of total trade between the two countries; officials blamed this on the current Israel–UK Trade Continuity agreement which only covers trade in goods. The trading relationship between the UK and Israel was valued at £6.4 billion, as of September 2023. A spokesperson for Prime Minister Rishi Sunak rejected the notion that the threatened invasion of Rafah would affect negotiations on the UK–Israel Free Trade Agreement.

On 20 May 2025, the UK suspended FTA negotiations with Israel. In spite of this, the UK continued to send trade representatives for meetings with Israel, and the trade volume between Israel and the UK increased 3.7%.

== See also ==
- Israel–United Kingdom relations
- Free trade agreements of Israel
- Free trade agreements of the United Kingdom
- Foreign relations of Israel
- Foreign relations of the United Kingdom
- United Kingdom and the Gaza war
