= Trade in services statistics =

Trade in services statistics are economic statistics which detail international trade in services. They received a great deal of focus at the advent of services negotiations which took place under the Uruguay Round, which became part of the General Agreement on Trade in Services, one of the four principal pillars of the World Trade Organization (WTO) trade treaty, also called the "WTO Agreement".

The General Agreement on Trade in Services (GATS) Four Modes of Supply comprises:

- Mode 1 Cross border trade, which is defined as delivery of a service from the territory of one country into the territory of other country;
- Mode 2 Consumption abroad - this mode covers supply of a service of one country to the service consumer of any other country;
- Mode 3 Commercial presence - which covers services provided by a service supplier of one country in the territory of any other country, i.e., foreign direct investment undertaken by a service provider;
- Mode 4 Presence of natural persons - which covers services provided by a service supplier of one country through the presence of natural persons in the territory another economy.

Statistics which correspondent to the GATS Four Modes of Supply comprise quantitative data addressing:

- Trade in services, which is defined as delivery of a service from the territory of one country into the territory of other country, specific disaggregation as per GATS Four Modes of Supply may not apply, i.e., this depends on decisions taken by each country;
- Foreign direct investment (FDI) Cross-border foreign investment as per International Monetary Fund guidelines. Roughly correspondent to Mode 3
- Foreign Affiliate Trade Statistics (FATS) Statistics, or corporate data detailing the operations of foreign direct investment-based enterprises, including sales, expenditures, profits, value-added, inter- and intra-firm trade, exports and imports; Roughly correspondent to Mode 3

Statistics which detail commercial services trade taking place under the GATS are in a state of development in most countries. Most countries don't have information which details trade as per the GATS Four Modes of Supply, which makes trade negotiations in this realm difficult, especially for developing country WTO members. The United States Bureau of Economic analysis produces rich statistics in this area, but they do not address the GATS Four Modes of Supply directly, rather, they address only cross-border services, generally defined, and statistics related to FDI. FATS, are collected by the United States BEA, and several other OECD countries.

== UN Manual on Services Statistics ==
- UN Manual on Statistics of International Trade in Services (from the UN website)

== Statistical databases ==
- OECD statistics on trade in services database
- OECD statistics on value added and employment
- Eurostat database: Industry, Trade and Services
- US BEA page on international economic accounts
- JETRO database for FDI and trade in goods and services
- UNCTAD FDI/TNC database
- UNCTAD World Investment Directory online
- ITC/UNCTAD/WTO Trade Map: Bilateral trade statistics and custom tariff by country and product
- ITC/UNCTAD Investment Map: Foreign direct investment together with foreign affiliates, international trade and tariffs
- ITC: trade in services statistics by country and service
