= United Kingdom and the Gaza war =

2020s military policies

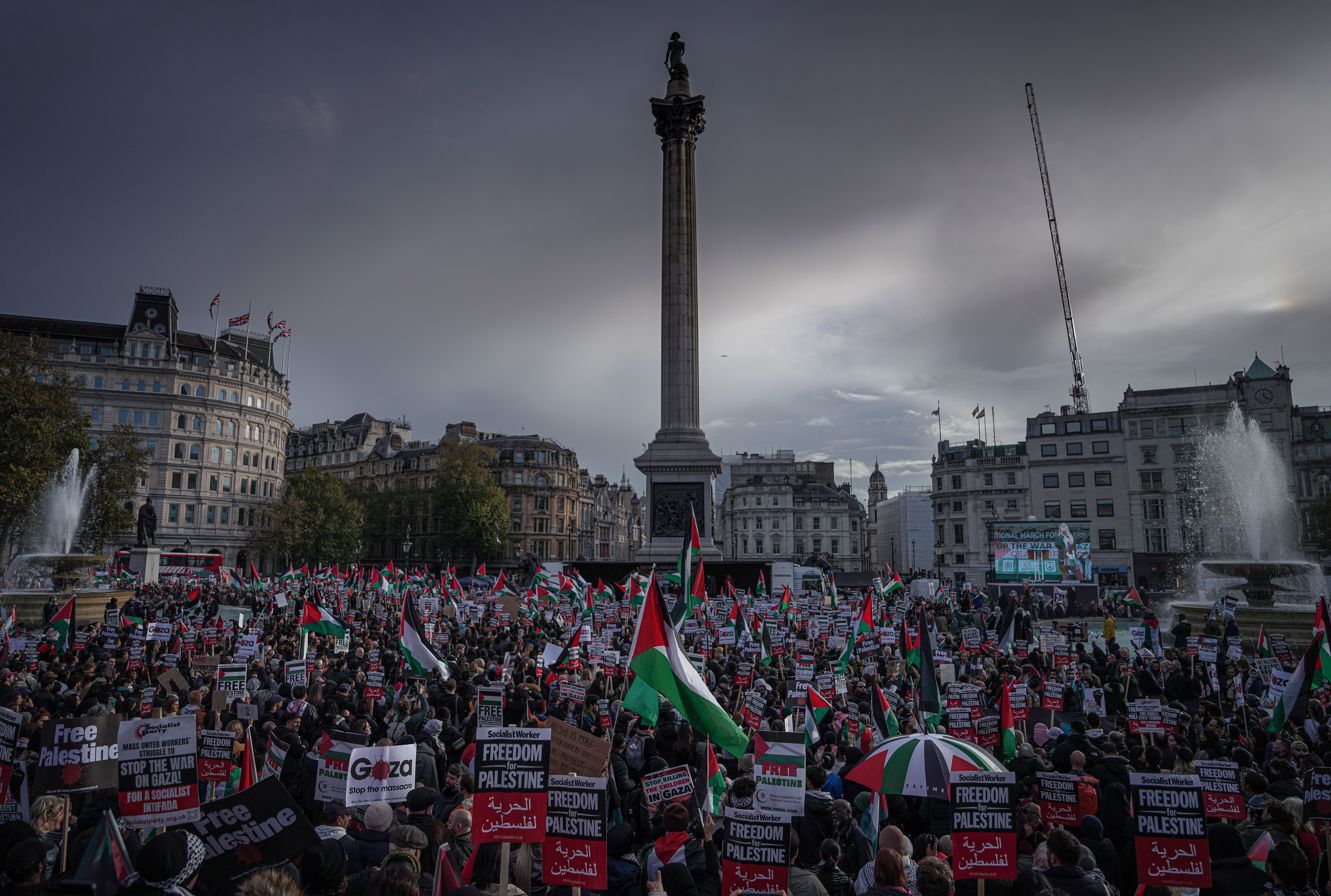
A pro-Palestinian protest at Trafalgar Square in London, 4 November 2023

During the Gaza war, the United Kingdom government has supported Israel diplomatically, has shared Gaza surveillance information with Israel and has allowed arms sales to Israel's military. It has also condemned some of Israel's actions, including its killing of Palestinian civilians and blockade of the Gaza Strip. The UK had a Conservative government led by Rishi Sunak until July 2024, and has had a Labour government led by Keir Starmer and later Andy Burnham since then. Both governments have called for a ceasefire, a two-state solution, and provided humanitarian aid to Gaza. There have also been many large anti-war protests throughout the UK. In September 2025, the UK formally recognised the State of Palestine.

In response to the October 7 attacks, Conservative Prime Minister Rishi Sunak said that the United Kingdom "unequivocally" stood with Israel. His government issued an "unequivocal condemnation" of Palestinian militant group Hamas and deployed British Armed Forces personnel and assets to the Eastern Mediterranean to support Israel if necessary. The Conservative government aligned itself with the United States, which gave significant support to Israel. In the first months, it abstained from three United Nations Security Council resolutions calling for immediate ceasefires. As a result, the UK was criticised as global calls for a ceasefire grew. Both the Conservative UK government and the Labour Party began calling for a ceasefire in December 2023, two months after the war began.

In May 2025, the UK's Labour government issued statements condemning Israel's ongoing attacks on Gaza, calling for Israel to immediately stop its military operations and to immediately allow humanitarian aid into Gaza. The UK government suspended negotiations on a free trade deal with Israel, summoned Israel's ambassador, and imposed new sanctions against Israeli West Bank settlers, warning of further "concrete actions" if Israel continued.

The UK government issues licenses to British companies to sell military equipment to Israel, and Israel has used British-supplied weapons in the war: British companies supply less than 1% of Israel's military imports, and according to the UK government, British military exports to Israel amounted to £18 million in 2023. Various international organisations, over 600 members of the British legal profession, and three former senior British judges argued that British arms sales to Israel violate international law, and could render the UK complicit in Israeli war crimes and genocide. Conservative Foreign Secretary David Cameron said in April 2024 that the government would not block British arms sales to Israel. In September 2024, the UK's Labour government suspended some arms export licenses to Israel.

== Timeline ==
=== October 2023 ===
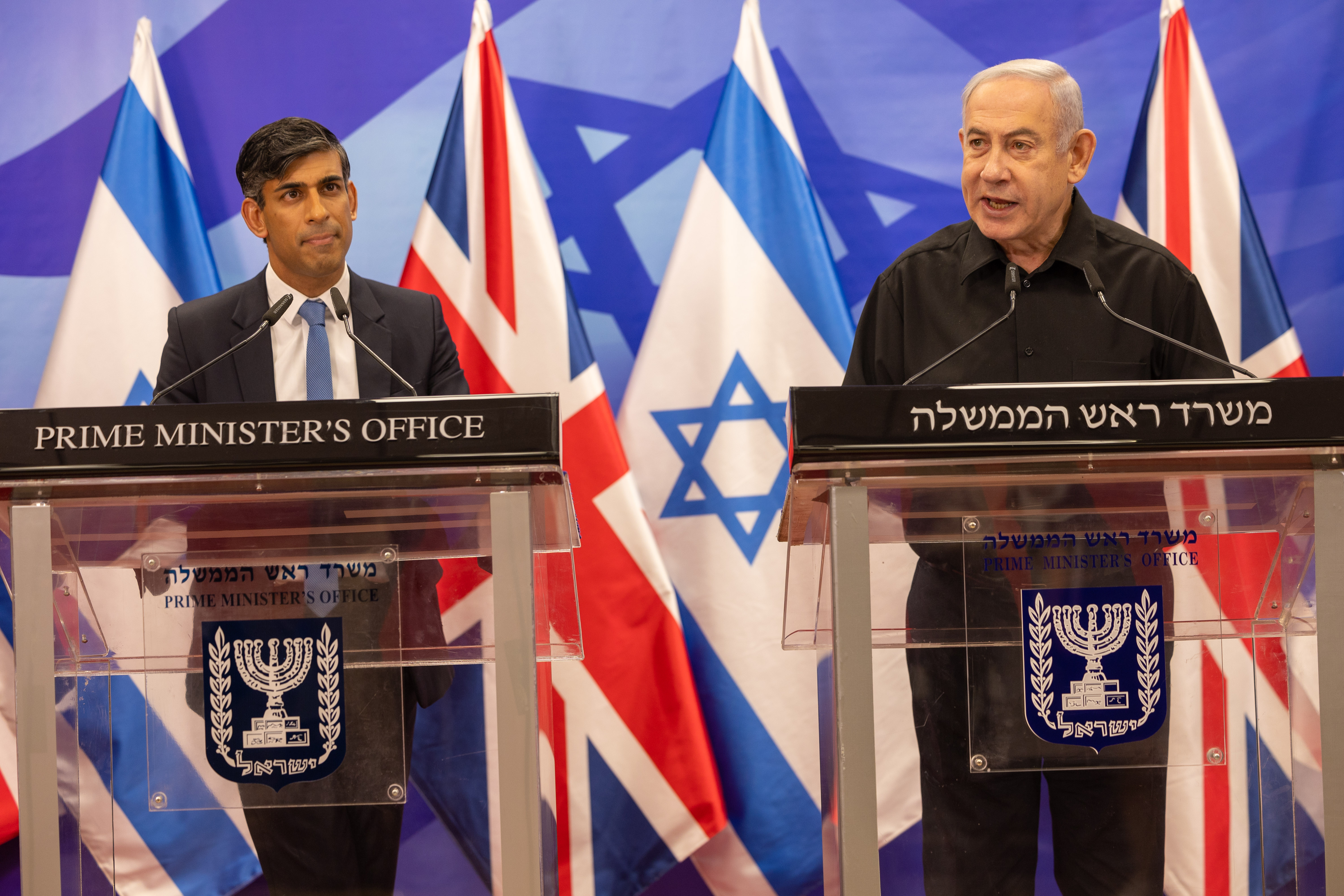
Rishi Sunak with Benjamin Netanyahu in Jerusalem, 19 October 2023

- On 8 October, British Prime Minister Rishi Sunak told Israeli Prime Minister Benjamin Netanyahu that the United Kingdom "unequivocally" stands with Israel. He also announced "we will continue to provide Israel with every support that it needs as we stand steadfast with Israel, including its right to self defence to ensure that these attacks do not happen."
- On 12 October, the UK announced that it would send two Royal Navy supports ships, 100 Royal Marines and surveillance aircraft to the Eastern Mediterranean from 13 October to support Israel. This includes Poseidon P-8 aircraft and other planes tasked partly with preventing weapon transfers to Hezbollah in Lebanon from Iran.
- On 18 October, the UK abstained from a United Nations Security Council resolution calling for "humanitarian pauses" to allow humanitarian aid into Gaza.
- On 19 October, British Prime Minister Rishi Sunak arrived in Tel Aviv in a two-day visit to "express solidarity with the Israeli people", as the relentless Israeli bombardment of the Gaza Strip has killed over 3,400 Palestinians.

=== November 2023 ===
- In November 2023, the Scottish National Party tabled a parliamentary motion calling for a ceasefire, saying in an official release, "It's time to call a spade a spade. To any neutral observer, war crimes are being committed by Israel in Gaza." No Conservative MPs voted for the motion and Labour said its MPs should abstain and, instead, vote on Labour's own motion calling for "humanitarian pauses" to the fighting. However, a number of its MPs, including frontbenchers, defied the order and voted for the ceasefire motion. Ten frontbenchers resigned from their position because they did not agree with the party line.

=== December 2023 ===
- On 2 December, the UK Ministry of Defence announced that it would begin surveillance flights over Gaza "in support of the ongoing hostage rescue activity".
- Former-Chief of the Defense Staff, David Richards, called on David Cameron to demand a ceasefire in December 2023.

=== January 2024 ===
- UK Foreign Secretary David Cameron expressed concern about potential breaches of international law by Israel, specifically addressing the need for Israel to restore water supplies to Gaza. Cameron said in the same month that "Israel is acting in self-defence after the appalling attack on October 7" and denied that Israel is committing war crimes in Gaza. He dismissed South Africa's ICJ genocide case against Israel as "nonsense", saying that Israel is "a democracy, a country with the rule of law, a country with armed forces that are committed to obeying the rule of law".

=== March 2024 ===
- Alicia Kearns, the Conservative chair of the Foreign Affairs Select Committee, stated in a fundraising speech that the UK government received internal legal advice that Israel had broken international humanitarian law.

=== April 2024 ===
- On 15 April, Karim Ahmad Khan, chief prosecutor of the International Criminal Court (ICC), informed the British government that he would be seeking arrest warrants for Israeli leaders accused of war crimes and crimes against humanity. On 23 April, David Cameron called Khan and threatened to withdraw the UK from the Rome Statute if Khan went ahead with seeking the warrants.

=== May 2024 ===
- On 21 May, Sunak criticized the ICC for seeking arrest warrants for Israeli Prime Minister Netanyahu and Defense Minister Yoav Gallant, as well as Hamas leader Yahya Sinwar, calling the action "deeply unhelpful". He emphasized that there is no "moral equivalence" between Israel and Hamas and argued that this move would make "absolutely no difference" to achieving wider peace in the Middle East.
- By May 2024, the UK had conducted 200 spy missions over Gaza in support of Israel. The planes took of from RAF Akrotiri airbase.

=== June 2024 ===
- On 8 June, the Nuseirat rescue operation was aided by intelligence support from the United Kingdom.

=== July 2024 ===
- UK Prime Minister Keir Starmer's spokesperson stated the UK was dropping its objections to the ICC prosecutor's request for arrest warrants against Benjamin Netanyahu and Yoav Gallant.

=== September 2024 ===
- On 2 September, Foreign Secretary David Lammy suspended thirty of 350 military export licenses to Israel after concluding there was a "clear risk" they might be used to commit serious violations of international law.

=== October 2024 ===
- On 18 October, following the killing of Yahya Sinwar, Prime Minister Keir Starmer said that the UK "will not mourn" the death of the Hamas leader, and described it as an opportunity for a ceasefire. Starmer added, "I say once again to Israel, the world will not tolerate any more excuses on humanitarian assistance. Civilians in northern Gaza need food, now".
- On 28 October, after Israel's parliament passed two laws banning UNRWA, Starmer issued a statement saying he was "gravely concerned". He said "The humanitarian situation in Gaza is simply unacceptable" and "Only UNRWA can deliver humanitarian aid at the scale and pace needed". The foreign ministers of the UK, Canada, Australia, France, Germany, Japan and South Korea issued a joint statement that Israel's move would have "devastating consequences", and affirmed: "It is crucial that UNRWA and other UN organisations and agencies be fully able to deliver humanitarian aid".

=== November 2024 ===
- On 22 November, the British government stated that Israeli Prime Minister Benjamin Netanyahu would be arrested if he travels to the UK, after the International Criminal Court issued an international arrest warrant for him for alleged war crimes.

=== April 2025 ===
- On 15 April, Israeli foreign minister Gideon Sa'ar secretly travelled to the UK and met foreign secretary David Lammy. They discussed "the ongoing hostage negotiations between Israel and Hamas, the need to protect aid workers, end the humanitarian blockade of Gaza and stop settlement expansion in the West Bank". Sa'ar had recently attempted to justify Israel's decision to cut off aid to Gaza. Reportedly, Lammy gave Sa'ar his personal assurance that he would not be arrested.

=== May 2025 ===
- On 19 May, the governments of the UK, France and Canada issued a joint statement condemning Israel's renewed offensive against Gaza. They called for Israel to immediately stop its military operations and to immediately allow humanitarian aid into Gaza, saying "The level of human suffering in Gaza is intolerable". The statement condemned Israel's plan to ethnically cleanse the Gaza Strip as "abhorrent" and said it would breach international law. The governments warned they would take "concrete actions" if Israel continued its "egregious actions".
- On 20 May, the UK suspended talks on a free trade deal with Israel, summoned the country's ambassador, and imposed new sanctions against Israeli West Bank settlers. Foreign Secretary David Lammy called Israel's renewed offensive in Gaza "morally unjustifiable". Referring to Israeli plans to ethnically cleanse the Gaza Strip, Lammy said "It is extremism, it is dangerous, it is repellent, it is monstrous, and I condemn it in the strongest possible terms".
- Israeli Prime Minister Benjamin Netanyahu berated UK Prime Minister Keir Starmer and the leaders of France and Canada. Netanyahu accused them of siding with Hamas, "emboldening Hamas to continue fighting". He said "When mass murderers, rapists, baby killers and kidnappers thank you, you're on the wrong side of justice, you're on the wrong side of humanity and you're on the wrong side of history".

=== June 2025 ===
- On 10 June, the UK government imposed sanctions on two Israeli ministers, Itamar Ben-Gvir and Bezalel Smotrich, for "repeated incitements of violence against Palestinian communities" in the occupied West Bank. They were banned from entering the UK and had any assets in the UK frozen. The joint move by the UK, Norway, Canada, Australia and New Zealand was condemned by Israel and the US. Smotrich replied: "Britain has already tried once to prevent us from settling the cradle of our homeland, and we cannot do it again".

=== July 2025 ===
- In early July, the UK government banned the pro-Palestinian direct action group Palestine Action as a terrorist group under the Terrorism Act 2000. UN experts, civil liberties groups, and hundreds of lawyers condemned the ban as draconian and said it sets a dangerous precedent by conflating protest with terrorism.
- On 21 July, the foreign ministers of the UK and 27 other countries issued a joint statement condemning Israel's aid distribution in Gaza. It said:
  The suffering of civilians in Gaza has reached new depths. The Israeli government's aid delivery model is dangerous, fuels instability and deprives Gazans of human dignity. We condemn the drip feeding of aid and the inhumane killing of civilians, including children, seeking to meet their most basic needs of water and food. It is horrifying that over 800 Palestinians have been killed while seeking aid. The Israeli Government's denial of essential humanitarian assistance to the civilian population is unacceptable.
- On 29 July, Starmer announced that the UK will recognise Palestinian statehood at the next meeting of the UN General Assembly unless Israel commits to a ceasefire, among other conditions regarding aid. Ghazi Hamad of Hamas welcomed the announcement saying it was "one of the fruits of October 7".

=== September 2025 ===
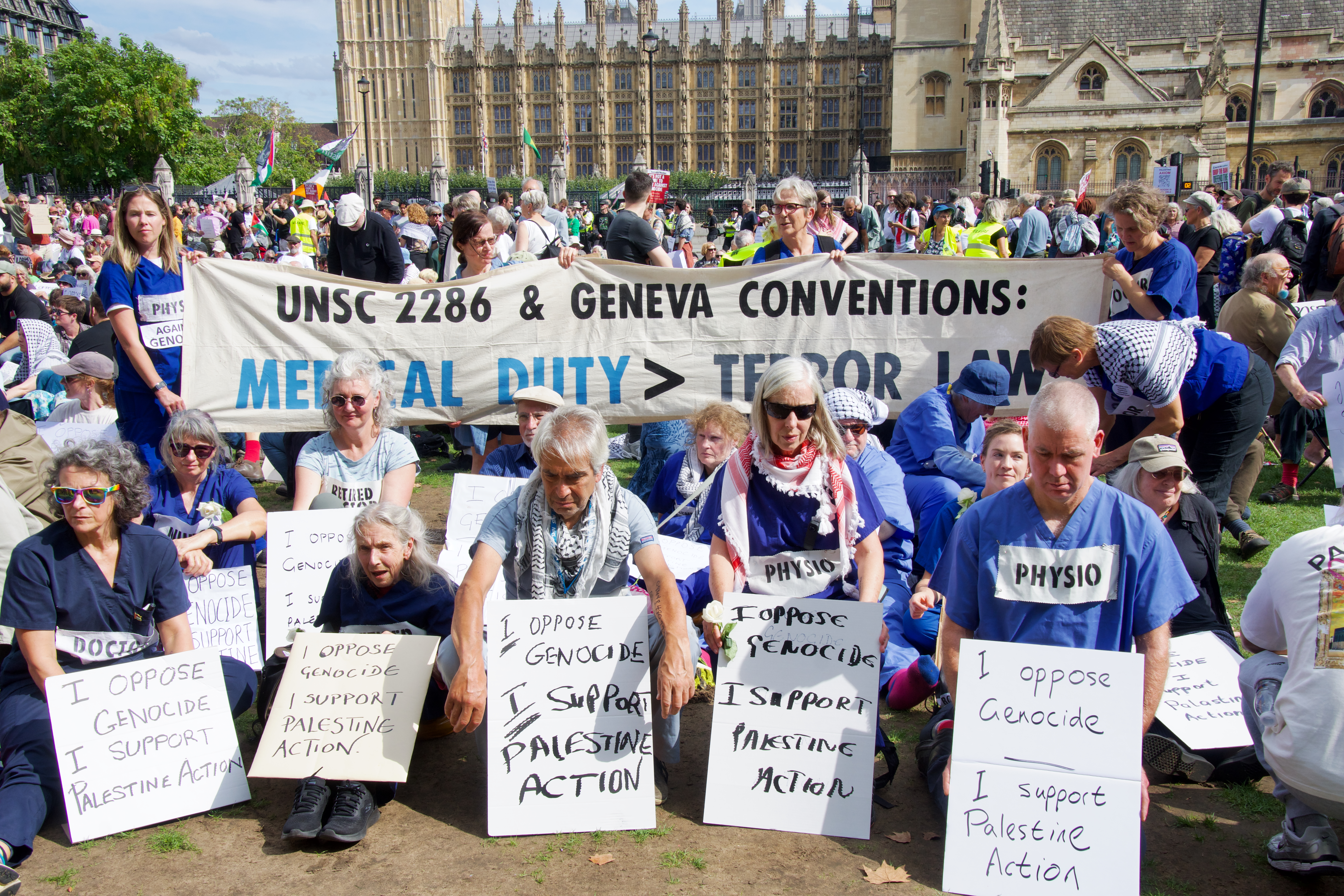
Palestine Action protest in London, 6 September 2025

- On 3 September, the Scottish Government announced a ban on funding to "arms companies whose products or services are provided to countries where there is plausible evidence of genocide being committed" including Israel. In announcing the ban, First Minister John Swinney said that, "The world cannot wait for a final court ruling before acting. The signs are clear." The decision was praised by the Scottish heads of Oxfam, Amnesty International, and Global Justice Now, who all urged the UK government to act as well. Scottish Parliament also voted for a boycott of Israel and any companies providing it military support.
- Protests against the banning of Palestine Action continued into September 2025, with close to 1,000 arrests in London alone on the first weekend of the month, days after the International Association of Genocide Scholars had backed a resolution stating that Israel's actions in Gaza meet the legal definition of the crime. Of those arrested on 6 September 2025, almost 100 were in their 70s, and 15 more were in their 80s.
- On 21 September, Starmer announced that the United Kingdom formally recognised Palestine as an independent state.

== Military exports ==
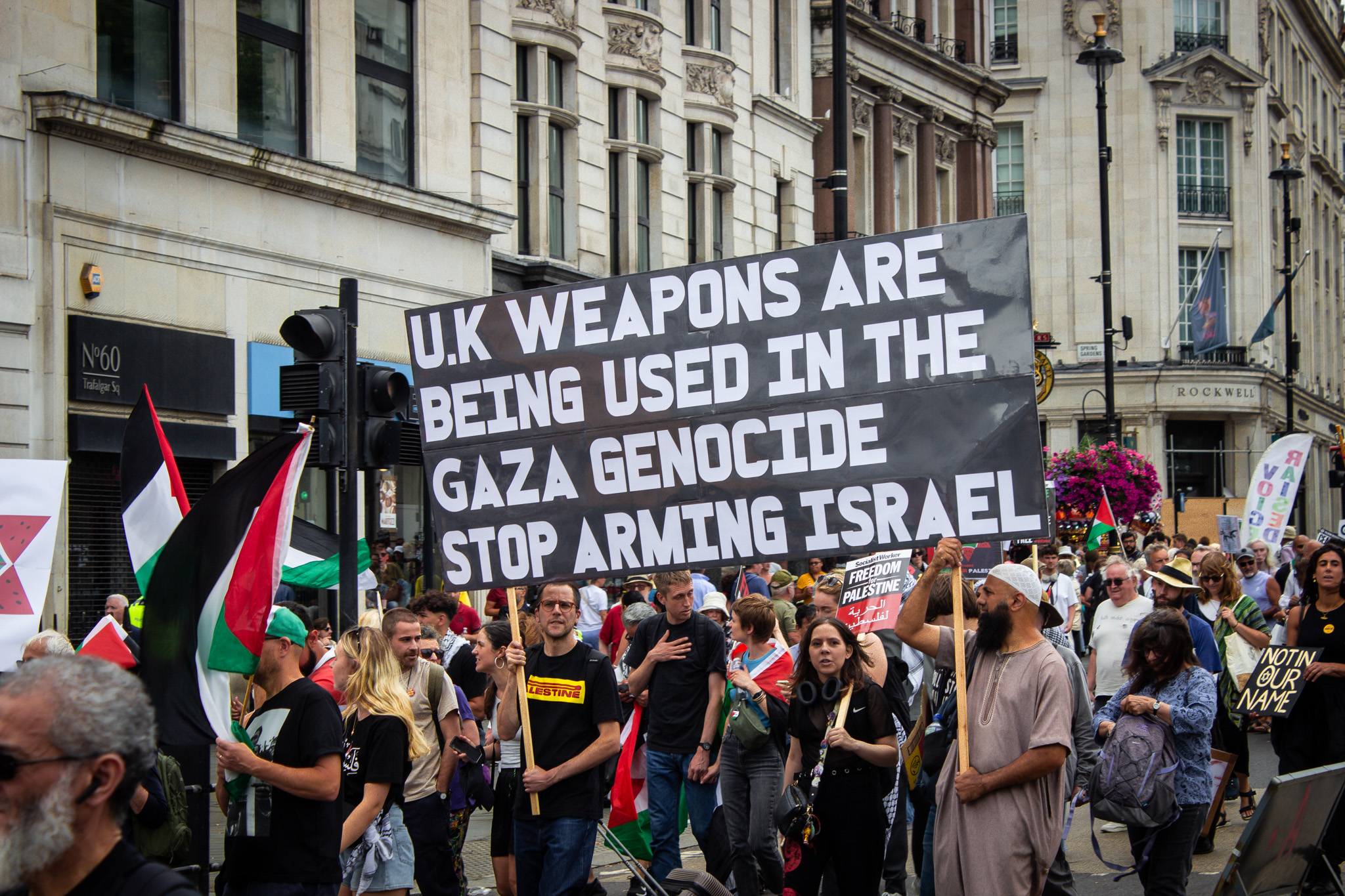
Pro-Palestinian protest at Trafalgar Square, 3 August 2024

Unlike the United States, the UK government does not give weapons directly to Israel but rather issues licences for British companies to sell weapons, with input from lawyers on whether the licences comply with international law. Israel used British-made weapons and military equipment in the war. British companies supply less than 1% of Israel's military imports. About 15% of the components of each Israeli F-35 fighter aircraft are made by British companies.

Direct action was taken at arms factories in the United Kingdom that supplied arms to Israel. For instance, on 10 November 2023, trade unionists in Rochester, Kent, blocked the entrances to a BAE Systems factory, stating the facility manufactured military aircraft components used to bomb Gaza; and on 16 November, Palestine Action occupied a Leonardo factory in Southampton, stopping production.

In response to the 13 July 2024 al-Mawasi attack, the UK-based organization Medical Aid for Palestinians released a statement saying, "The UK Government must now act urgently to suspend arms sales to Israel and prevent further atrocities." Following an ICJ advisory opinion that Israel was violating international law, Philippe Sands stated that the UK should stop arming Israel. In August 2024, Foreign Office official Mark Smith resigned over the UK's continued arming of Israel despite its alleged breaches of international law.

In early-September 2024, the UK suspended 30 out of the 350 military export licenses to Israel, having concluded there was a "clear risk" they "might be used to commit or facilitate a serious violation of international humanitarian law".

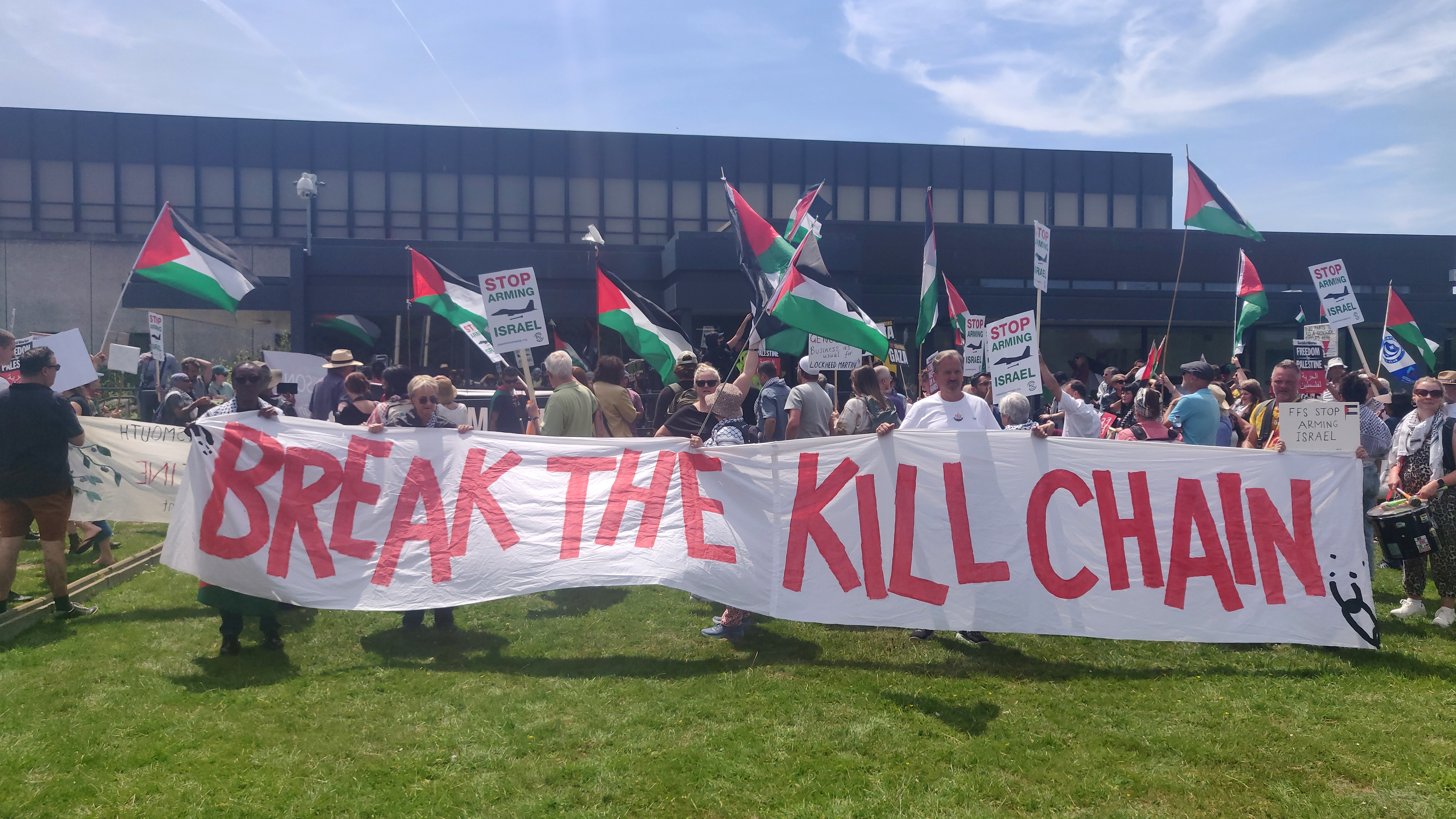
Protest at Lockheed Martin UK in Havant, UK, 17 June 2025

In June 2025, Britain's High Court ruled that the British government's decision to allow the export of F-35 fighter jet parts to Israel is lawful.

== Surveillance flights over Gaza ==
The Royal Airforce (RAF) has conducted hundreds of surveillance flights over Gaza since December 2023 using Shadow R1 spy planes located at RAF Akrotiri in Cyprus. The flights have been carried out almost daily by unmanned aircraft. According to the Ministry of Defence the aim of the flights was to gather intelligence on the Israeli hostages in Gaza. Any information on their whereabouts will be shared with Israel. Between December 2023 and June 2024, more than 250 RAF flights over Gaza have been recorded. By March 2025, the UK conducted over 500 spy flights over Gaza.

The Shadow is flown by 14 Squadron, based at RAF Waddington. Additionally, Poseidon P-8 maritime patrol and reconnaissance aircraft and RAF Rivet Joints, electronic surveillance aircraft, have also operated in the region.

In October 2023, the Ministry of Defence announced that it is willing to share intelligence related to war crimes with the International Criminal Court (ICC). The MoD has denied providing targeting information to the Israeli military or that RAF aircraft have been used to transfer weapons to Israel. In October 2024, Parliamentary Under-Secretary of State for the Armed Forces Luke Pollard said that the surveillance flights were “solely tasked to support hostage rescue.” Efforts by parliamentarians, like Kenny MacAskill and Imran Hussain, to probe the true purpose of these flights have been repeatedly blocked by the government.

According to a FOI request request by Declassified UK the MoD has responded that it has video footage from the Israeli attack on the World Central Kitchen convoy on 1 April 2024, but has refused to publish it.

== Humanitarian aid to Gaza ==
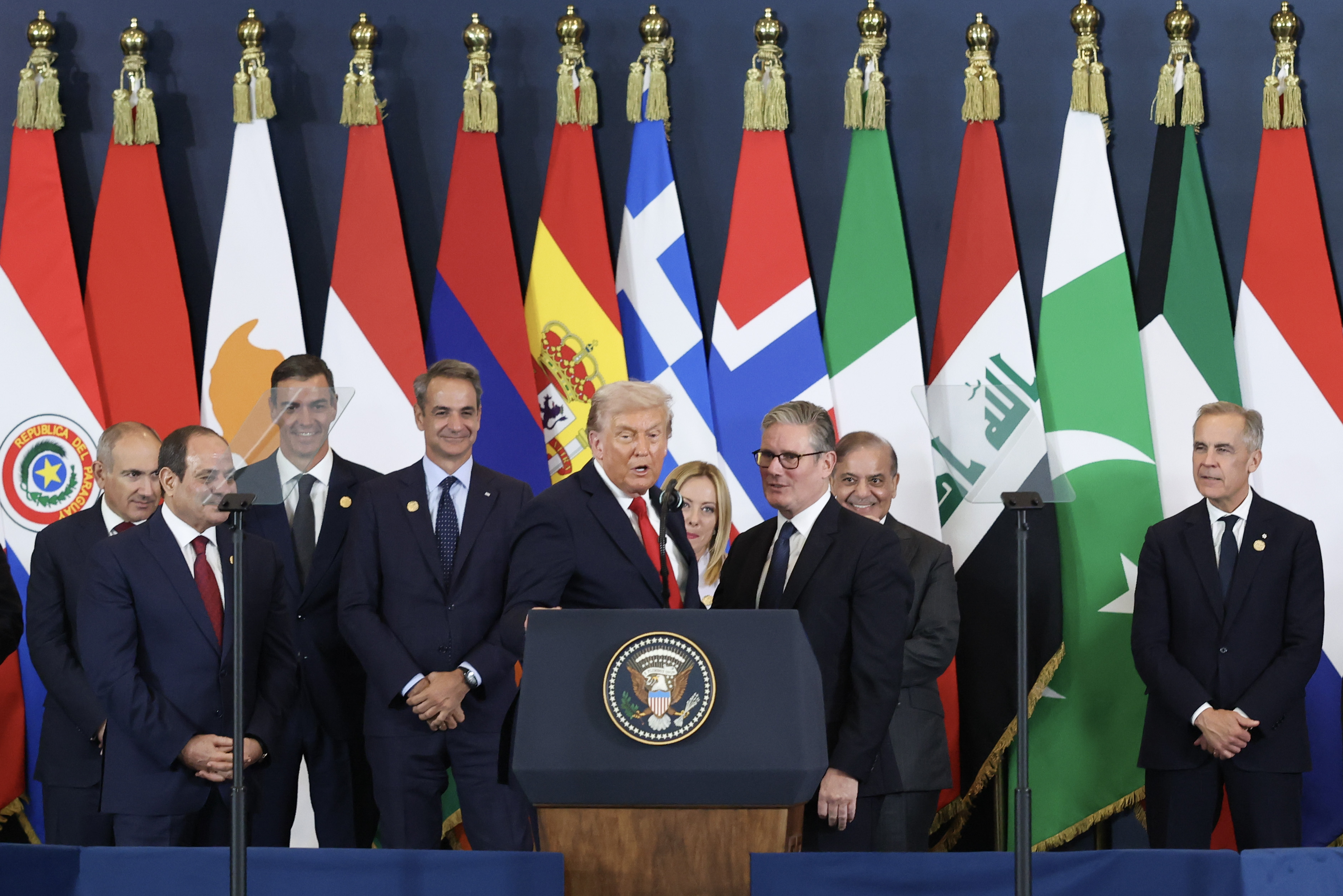
Starmer and Donald Trump at the Gaza peace summit in Sharm El Sheikh, Egypt, 13 October 2025

The British government has provided humanitarian aid to civilians in Gaza during the war.

For 2023–2024, the UK committed over £100 million in aid to Palestine. This included £35 million for UNRWA.

For 2024–2025, the UK committed £129 million in aid to Palestine. This included £34 million for UNRWA.

In February 2023, the UK's Royal Air Force began airdropping aid into northern Gaza, inaccessible by land or sea, with help from the Royal Jordanian Air Force. On 25 February the government pledged a further £4.25 million in sexual and reproductive aid to Palestinian women, projected to reach around 1 in 5 women in Gaza.

== Views of parties and politicians ==
=== Conservatives ===
==== Rishi Sunak ====
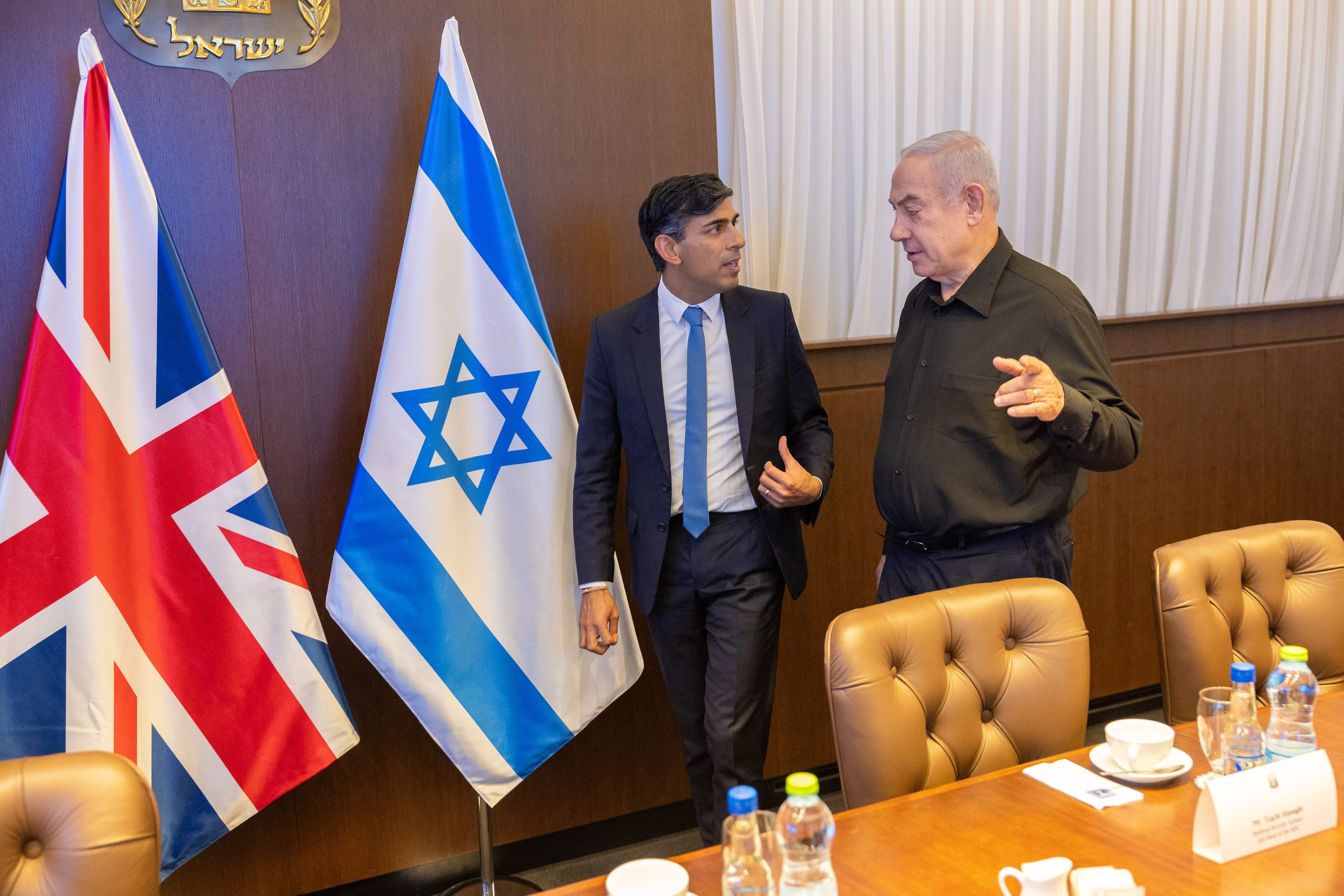
British Prime Minister Rishi Sunak meeting with Israeli Prime Minister Benjamin Netanyahu in Jerusalem, 19 October 2023

In the aftermath of the October 7 attacks, UK Prime Minister Rishi Sunak pledged the United Kingdom's support for Israel and declared that Israel "has an absolute right to defend itself". Sunak backed calls for humanitarian pauses to allow for aid to be brought into the Gaza Strip during the Gaza conflict, although he initially rejected calls for a full ceasefire as he argued that this would only benefit Hamas. However, Sunak later condemned the high number of civilian casualties during the Israeli bombardment of Gaza and called for a "sustainable ceasefire" in which all Israeli hostages are returned to Israel, attacks against Israel cease and humanitarian aid is allowed into Gaza. His government supports the two-state solution as a resolution to the conflict.

Since the outbreak of the war, Sunak's government pledged millions of pounds in humanitarian aid to civilians in Gaza and pushed for the opening of the Rafah Border Crossing to allow for the evacuation of British nationals and the provision of aid to civilians. Sunak also deployed Royal Navy and Royal Air Force assets to patrol the eastern Mediterranean Sea with the stated purpose of supporting humanitarian efforts and monitoring threats to regional security. Sunak's administration implemented sanctions against leading figures in Hamas and Palestinian Islamic Jihad, including Hamas co-founder Mahmoud al-Zahar, as well as imposing travel bans against Israeli settlers involved in violent activities in the West Bank.

Sunak reaffirmed his support for humanitarian pauses and an eventual ceasefire in the war in Gaza ahead of a debate on the subject on 21 February, but argued that an immediate ceasefire would not be successful and would not be in anyone's interest. The following day, the Scottish National Party tabled an opposition day amendment calling for an immediate ceasefire. Sunak's government tabled an amendment supporting an eventual ceasefire while emphasizing its support for Israel's right to self-defence and opposition to Hamas. However, in a break with Parliamentary convention, Speaker of the House Lindsay Hoyle chose to select a non-binding Labour Party amendment calling for an immediate ceasefire to be voted on first, which led to the government withdrawing its amendment and the Labour amendment being passed without a vote taking place. Amidst the ensuing controversy, Sunak described Hoyle's actions as "very concerning" but did not support calls from within the Conservative Party for the Speaker to be ousted.

When the International Criminal Court prosecutor Karim Ahmad Khan announced that he would seek to charge Israeli president Benjamin Netanyahu with war crimes, Sunak denounced the move as "unhelpful" and accused Khan of drawing a moral equivalence between Israel and Hamas.

==== David Cameron ====
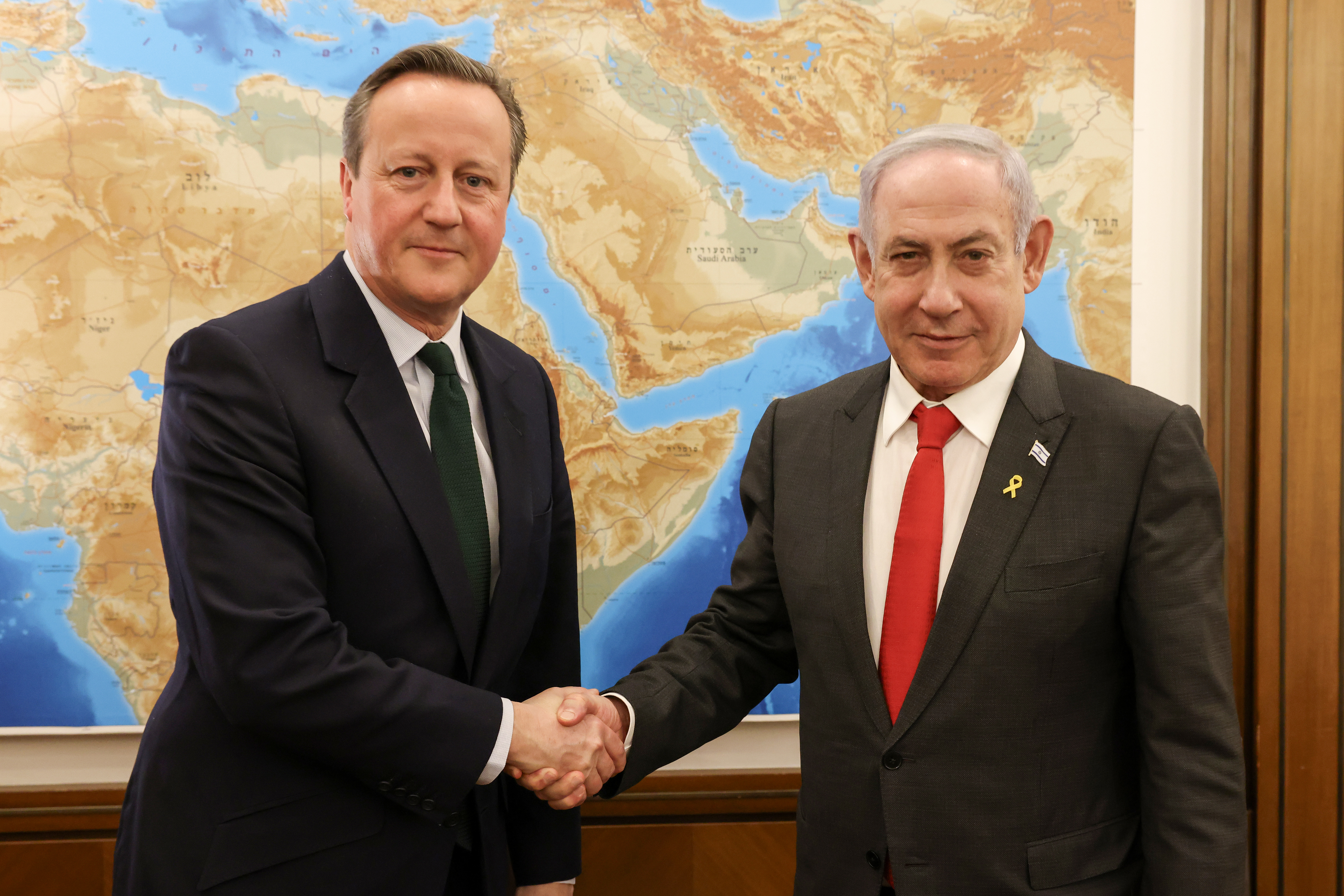
Cameron meets with Netanyahu whilst visiting Jerusalem, 24 January 2024

Foreign Secretary David Cameron visited the site of the Be'eri massacre on 23 November to meet Israeli foreign minister Eli Cohen. Afterwards, he met the Israeli prime minister Benjamin Netanyahu to discuss among other urgent matters, facilitating further aid to Gaza. Cameron said in an interview with the BBC that he told Israeli officials that "they must abide by international humanitarian law" and that the number of Palestinian casualties was "too high". He also said that the "settler violence" against Palestinians in the occupied West Bank is "completely unacceptable". Cameron backed a "sustainable ceasefire" in the Gaza war on 17 December, called for more aid to reach Gaza, and called for the Israeli government to "do more to discriminate sufficiently between terrorists and civilians". He, however, rejected calls for a "general and immediate ceasefire", differentiating this from the "sustainable ceasefire" he called for alongside German foreign minister Annalena Baerbock.

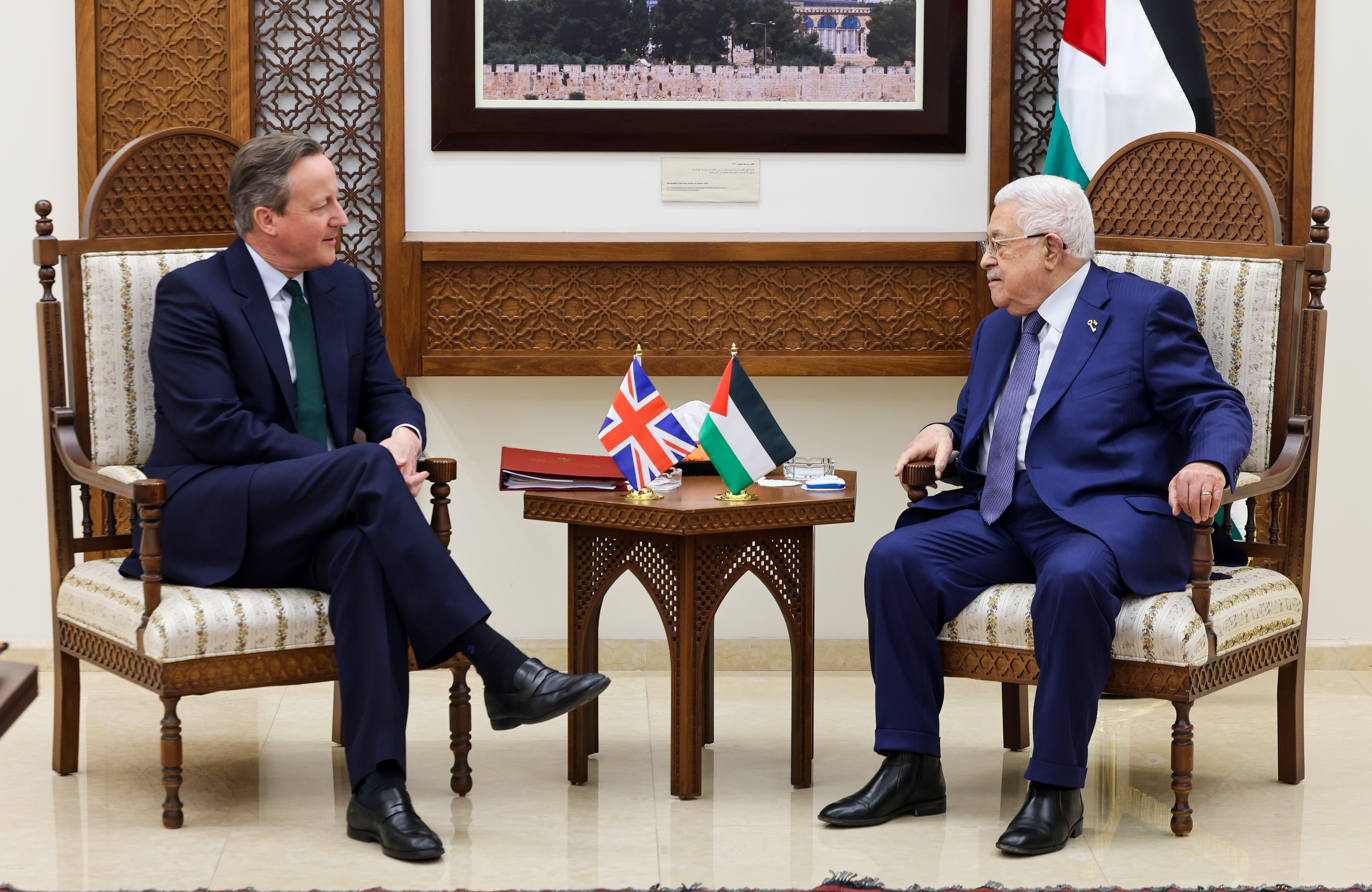
David Cameron meeting with Mahmoud Abbas, President of Palestine, January 2024

In January 2024, he expressed concern about potential breaches of international law by Israel, specifically addressing the need for Israel to restore water supplies to Gaza. Cameron said in the same month that "Israel is acting in self-defence after the appalling attack on October 7" and denied that Israel is committing war crimes in Gaza. He dismissed South Africa's ICJ genocide case against Israel as "nonsense", saying that Israel is "a democracy, a country with the rule of law, a country with armed forces that are committed to obeying the rule of law".

Cameron announced in late January that the government would consider recognising Palestine as a country, while also adding that would help to make a two-state solution "irreversible".

Cameron supported the February 2024 US Senate bill to allocate military aid to Ukraine Taiwan and Israel, saying that he did not want the West to "show weakness displayed against Vladimir Putin in 2008, when he invaded Georgia, or the uncertainty of the response in 2014, when he took Crimea and much of the Donbas—before coming back to cost us far more with his aggression in 2022". In the event the Senate bill failed to pass in the House of Representatives, where it was stalled by the GOP partisans of Donald Trump. At last a redrafted legislative package was put forward by Speaker Mike Johnson each of which passed the House with bipartisan support and large majorities on 20 April, but not before Cameron was snubbed by Johnson.

Iran attacked Israel in April 2024 with 301 drones and missiles, and the UK aided Israel to shoot them all down with RAF Eurofighter Typhoons. Cameron told LBC radio host Nick Ferrari that, were the UK to offer the same sort of support to Ukraine, it would represent a "dangerous escalation." In the same month, he became the first British foreign secretary to visit Tajikistan, Kyrgyzstan and Turkmenistan.

Cameron claimed that in July 2024 he had been preparing to sanction Israeli ministers Itamar Ben-Gvir and Bezalel Smotrich for inciting violence against Palestinians, but his attempts had been derailed by the general election.

In September 2024, a former Foreign Commonwealth and Development Office official stated that Cameron sat on clear evidence of Israeli war crimes, despite the risk of UK complicity with these breaches.

==== Suella Braverman ====
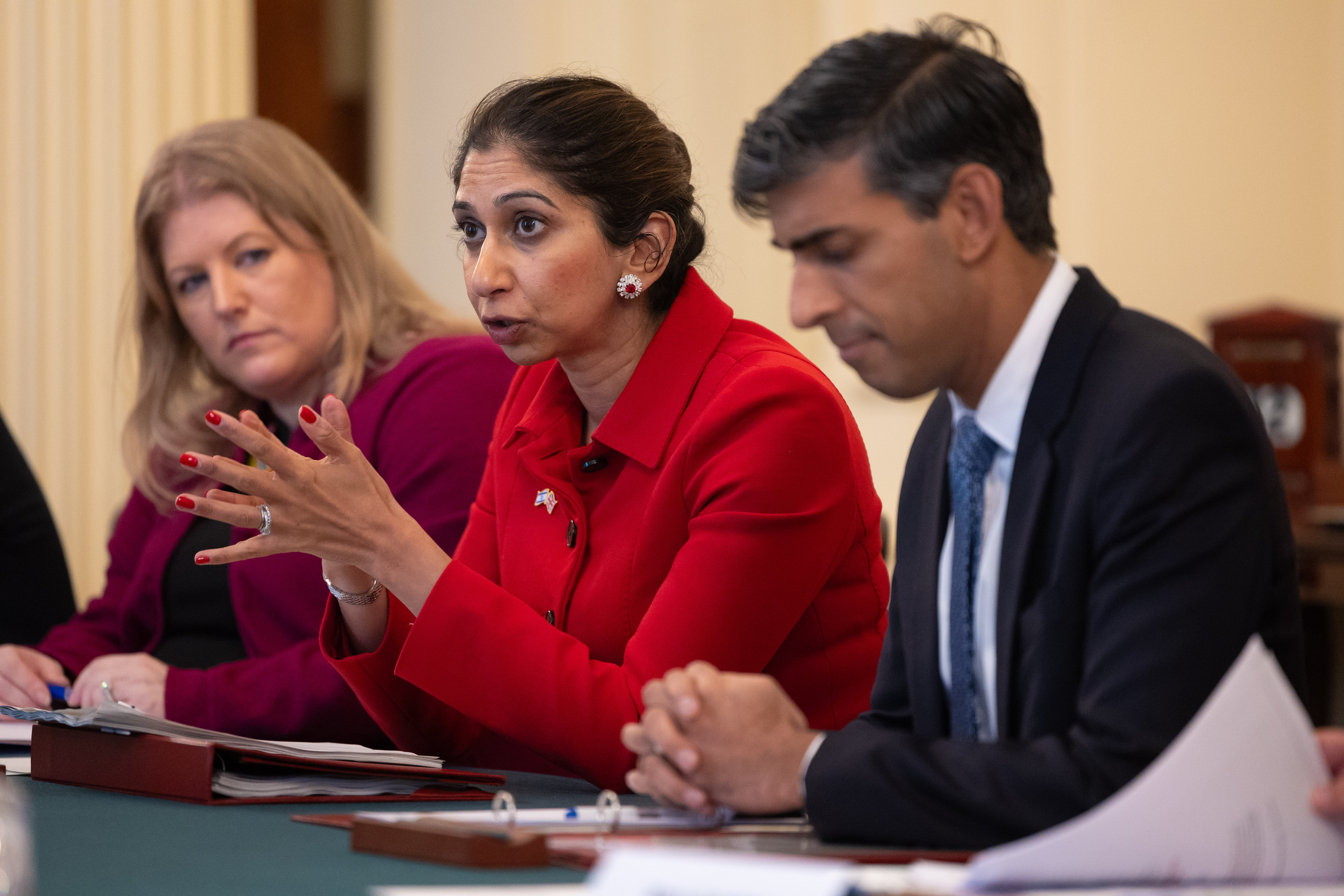
Suella Braverman (middle) with Prime Minister Rishi Sunak on 12 October 2023

Following the October 7 attacks, then home secretary Suella Braverman said in a letter to chief constables in England and Wales: "I would encourage police to consider whether chants such as: 'From the river to the sea, Palestine will be free' (...) in certain contexts may amount to a racially aggravated section 5 public order offence", adding that "Behaviours that are legitimate in some circumstances, for example the waving of a Palestinian flag, may not be legitimate such as when intended to glorify acts of terrorism".

She later described subsequent pro-Palestine marches during the Israel–Gaza war as "hate marches (...) chanting for the erasure of Israel from the map" containing a "large number of bad actors who are deliberately operating beneath the criminal threshold". In criticism of marches proposed to take place on Armistice Day, she cited "reports that some of Saturday's march group organisers have links to terrorist groups, including Hamas" and compared it to marches in Northern Ireland. Scotland's First Minister Humza Yousaf called for her resignation and accused her of "fanning the flames of division". The Labour Party and some police officers said that Braverman's writing had led to far-right supporters attacking police on 11 November.

Braverman wrote an opinion piece that was published in The Times on 8 November which included a statement that there was "a perception that senior police officers play favourites when it comes to protesters" and were tougher on right-wing extremists than pro-Palestinian "mobs". The Guardian reported that the Prime Minister's office had asked for changes to be made to the article, but not all were implemented. Braverman was dismissed as Home Secretary in the cabinet reshuffle of 13 November 2023. According to The Guardian, the trigger for her sacking was her Times article. The Telegraph throws doubt on this view, reporting that David Cameron was offered the role of foreign secretary on 7 November 2023, the day before Braverman's Times article was published.

==== Other Conservatives ====
In the first month of the war, Conservative MP Paul Bristow wrote to Prime Minister Rishi Sunak asking him to call for a ceasefire – an act for which his party sacked him from his government role as ministerial aide.

Conservative Ben Wallace, former-Secretary of State for Defence, said Israel's war tactics "will fuel the conflict for another 50 years [and] are radicalising Muslim youth across the globe."

=== Labour ===
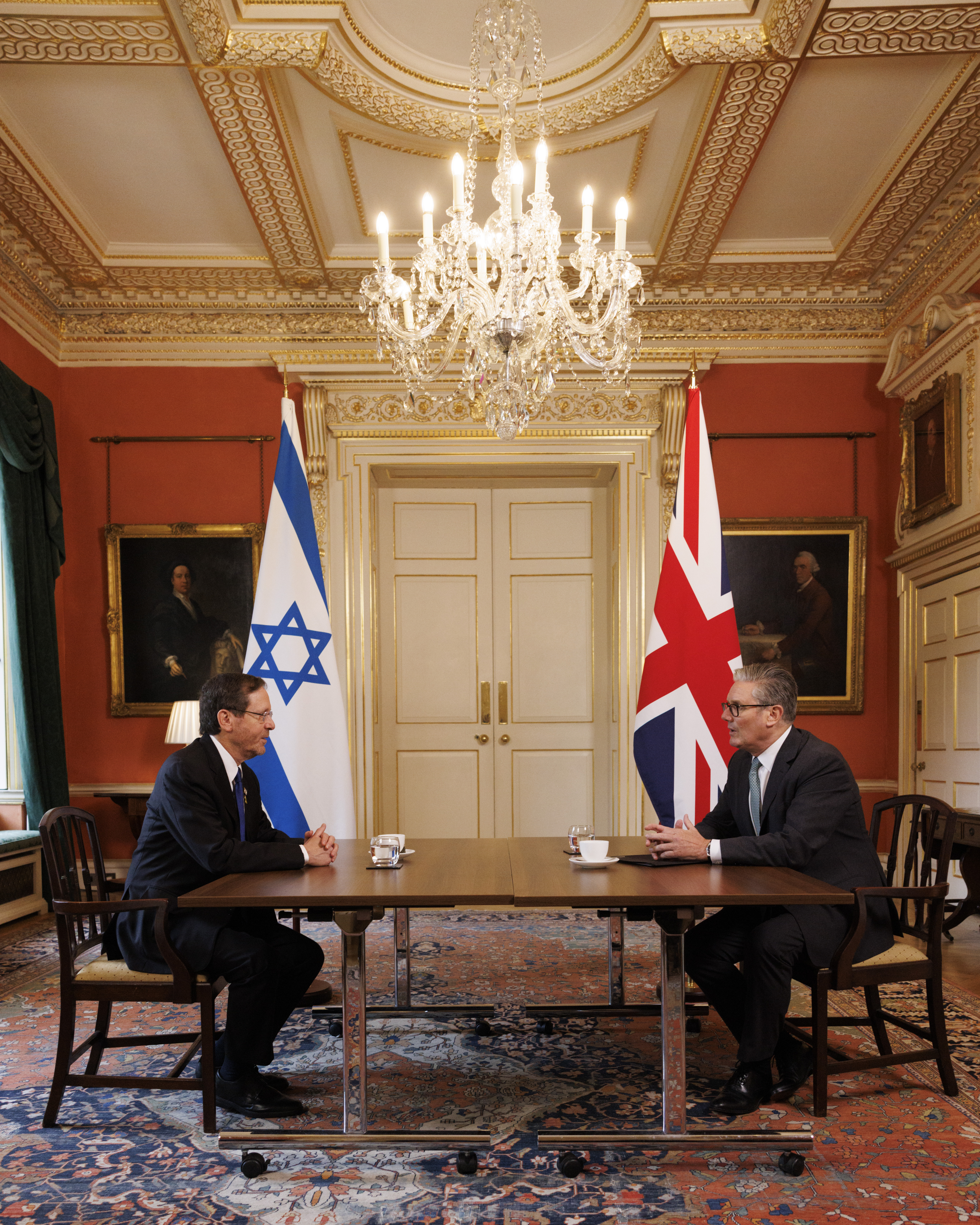
Keir Starmer with Israeli President Isaac Herzog at 10 Downing Street, September 2025

Shortly after the initial Hamas attack, Labour issued a warning to its MPs and council members that they should not attend pro-Palestine rallies. In October 2023, Labour MP Apsana Begum visited a Palestine Solidarity Campaign stall, posing for a picture, at the Labour Party Conference in Liverpool. Labour MP Andy McDonald spoke at a pro-Palestine rally; following the rally, Labour fired him because he had said "from the river to the sea".

In the early weeks of the war, hundreds of Labour councillors wrote to Starmer urging him to call for a ceasefire. In October 2023, the leaders of Greater Manchester's 10 metropolitan district councils (all but one of which were led by Labour), the Labour mayor of Greater Manchester, Andy Burnham, and Deputy Mayor of Greater Manchester for Policing and Crime Kate Green, released a statement calling for a ceasefire. Dozens resigned from the Labour Party in the first month of the war because the party had not yet called for a ceasefire. This included former city mayor Claire Darke, and Labour MP Imran Hussain, who resigned from his shadow minister role because he could not advocate for a ceasefire while in the position.

Under pressure from party members to back a ceasefire, in the third week of the war, Starmer adapted the official Labour position to one critical of Israeli military bombardment, but falling short of calling for a ceasefire. In December 2023, Starmer said there needed to be "a sustainable ceasefire as quickly as possible". In February 2024, the Labour Party called for an "immediate humanitarian ceasefire".

==== Keir Starmer ====
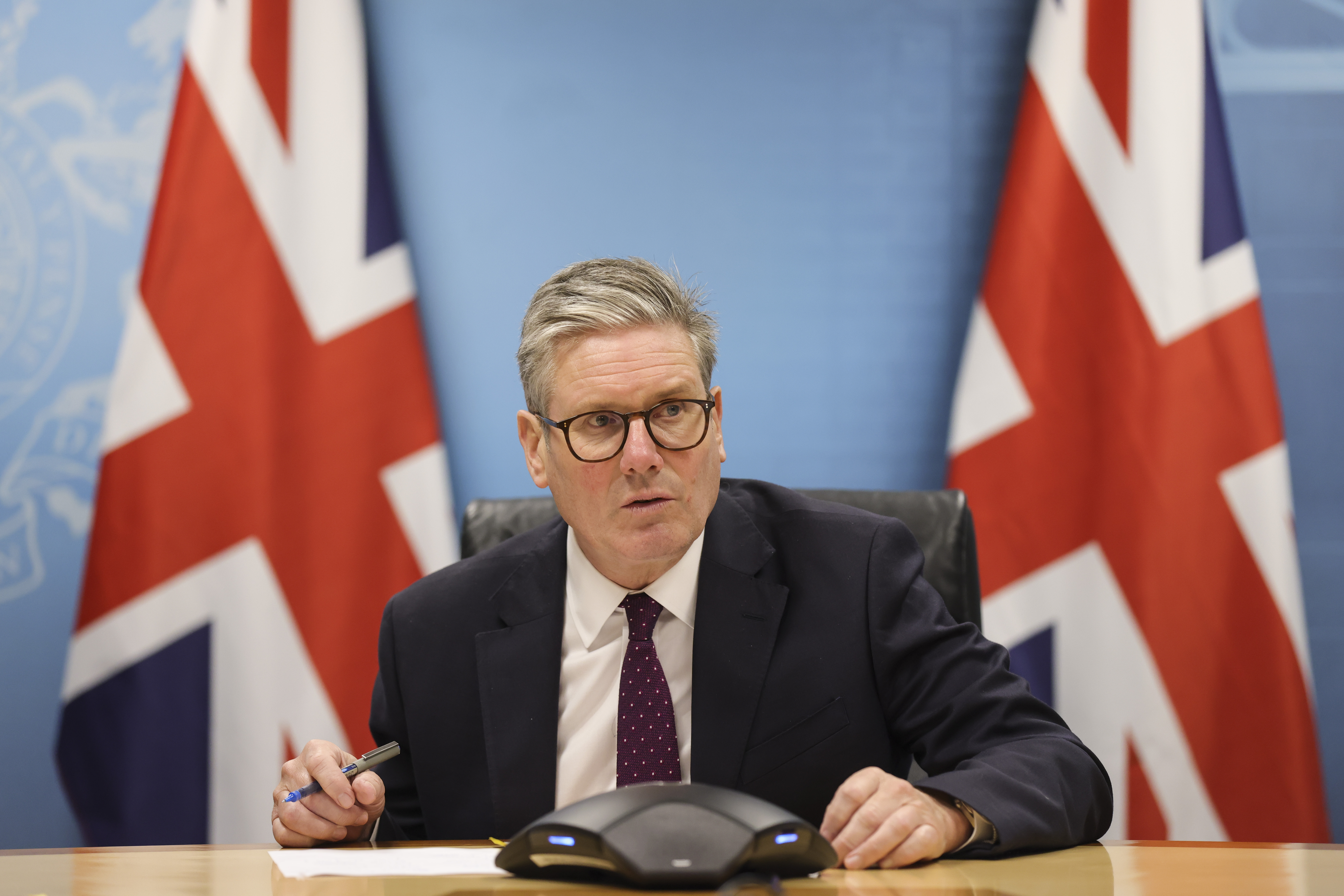
Prime Minister Keir Starmer on a call to Benjamin Netanyahu, October 2024

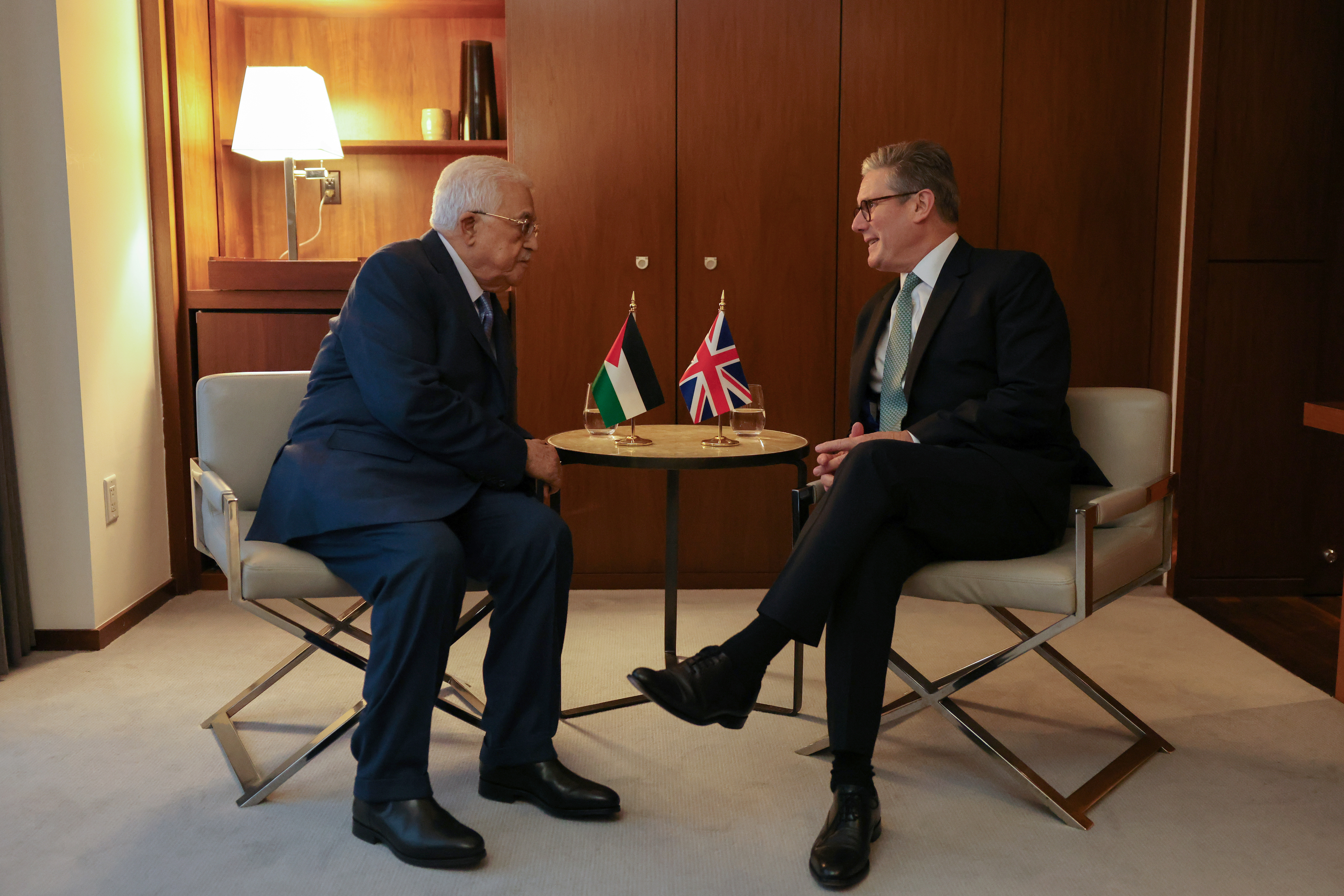
Keir Starmer meeting with Mahmoud Abbas, President of Palestine, September 2024

After the Hamas-led attack on Israel on 7 October 2023, which began the Gaza war, Labour leader and Leader of the Opposition Keir Starmer expressed support for Israel, condemned Hamas's attack, and said, "This action by Hamas does nothing for Palestinians. And Israel must always have the right to defend her people." In an interview with LBC on 11 October 2023, Starmer was asked whether it would be appropriate for Israel to totally cut off power and water supplies to the Gaza Strip, with Starmer replying that "I think that Israel does have that right" and that "obviously everything should be done within international law". On 20 October, after criticism and resignations of Labour councillors, Starmer said that he only meant that Israel had the right to defend itself. Starmer had said that a ceasefire would only benefit Hamas for future attacks, instead calling for a humanitarian pause to allow aid to reach Gaza. As of 6 November 2023, 50 of Labour's councillors had resigned over the issue.

On 16 November 2023, Starmer suffered a major rebellion when 56 of his MPs (including ten frontbenchers) defied a three-line whip in voting for a Scottish National Party (SNP) motion proposed by Stephen Flynn to support an "immediate ceasefire" in Gaza. Prior to the vote, Starmer stated that Labour MPs with positions in his Shadow Cabinet would be sacked if they voted in favour of the ceasefire vote. This then led to the loss of ten frontbenchers, including eight shadow ministers. In December 2023, Starmer followed Sunak in changing his stance by calling for a "sustainable ceasefire as quickly as possible", which also came after the Foreign Secretary David Cameron's same change in position. Starmer stated his support for a "two-stage", "two-state solution". The Labour Party under Starmer suspended several parliamentary candidates and MPs, including Graham Jones, Andy McDonald, Azhar Ali and Kate Osamor, for allegedly making anti-Semitic comments about Israel during the Israel-Hamas war, or for describing its conduct as genocide. On 18 February 2024, Starmer called for a "ceasefire that lasts" and said it must "happen now".

==== David Lammy ====
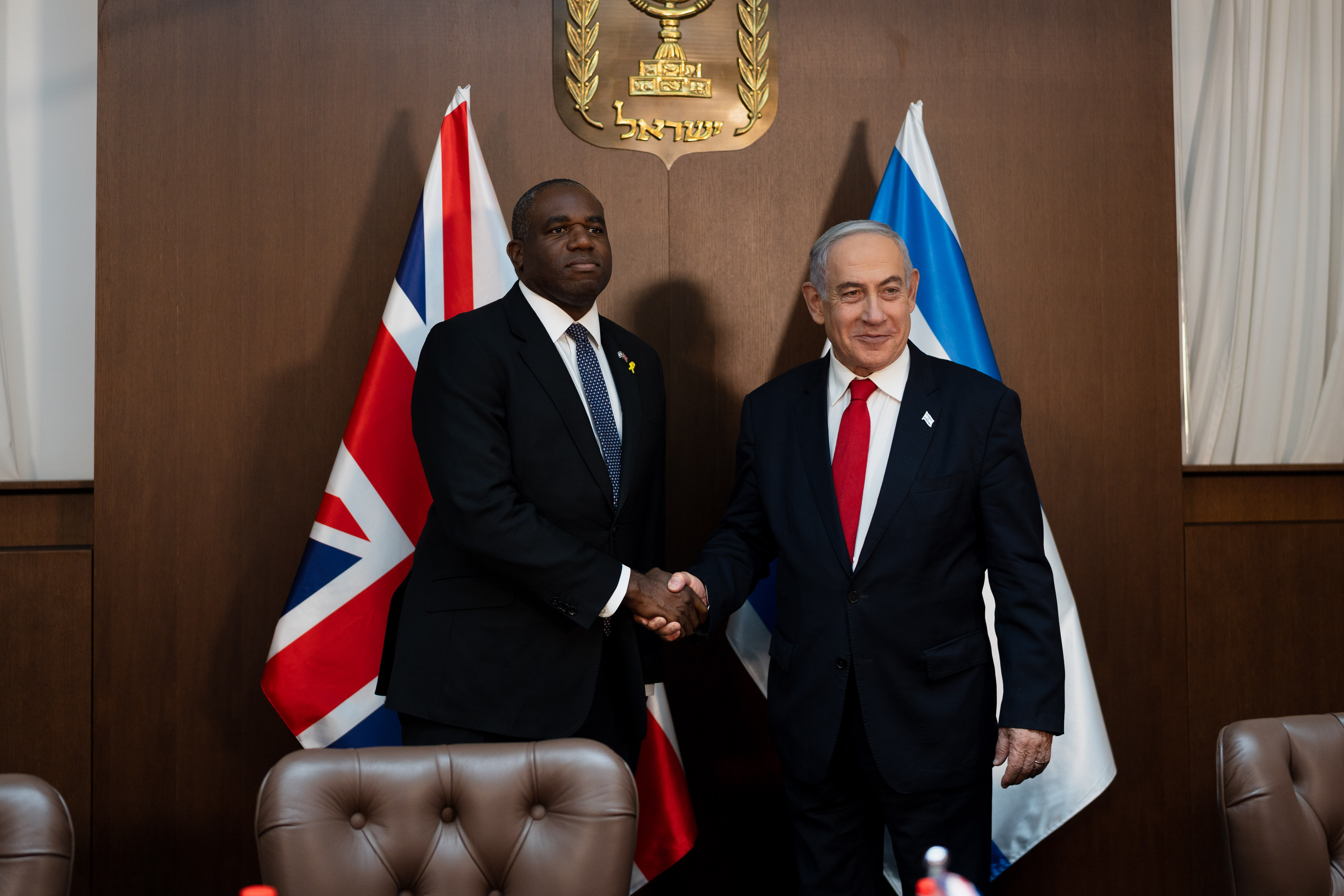
Lammy with Netanyahu in Jerusalem, Israel on 14 July 2024

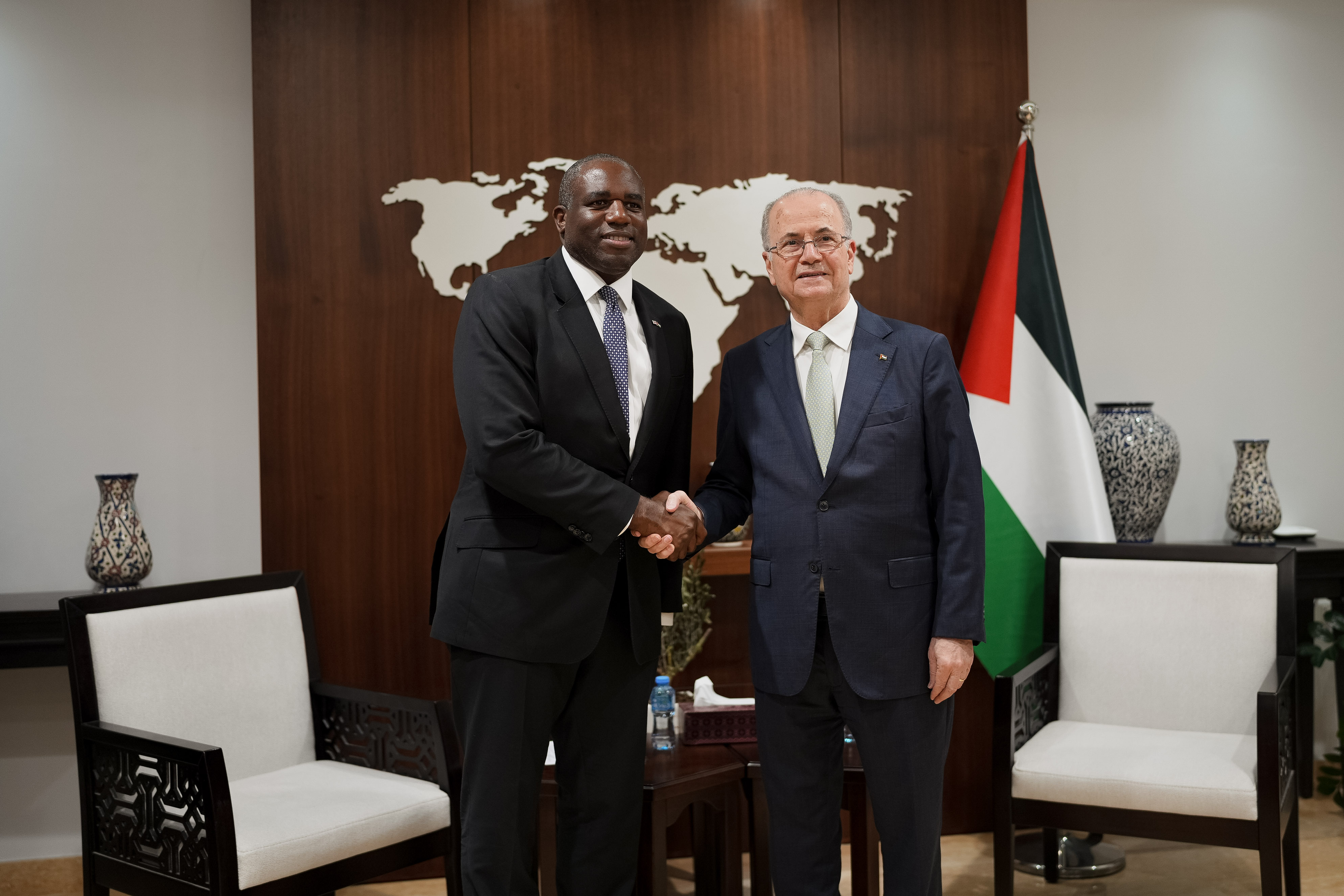
Lammy with Palestinian Prime Minister Mohammad Mustafa, July 2024

Shadow Foreign Secretary David Lammy issued a statement condemning the 7 October attacks as "unprovoked". In a speech at a Labour Friends of Israel event shortly after the attack, Lammy said “We hold on to the ideal of a two-state solution and we say to Hamas, your actions have set back the cause of peace. Free the hostages. Let them come home. Put down your weapons. Because as surely as night follows day, we say, of course Israel has a right to defend itself.” During a visit to Israel he called for "[h]ard diplomacy...with all governments in the region" to deliver a humanitarian pause and secure the release of Israeli hostages in Gaza. When asked to comment on Israel's bombing of the Jabalia refugee camp in November, Lammy said that the bombing was morally wrong but added "if there is a military objective it can be legally justifiable". Lammy abstained from voting on a Parliamentary motion to call for a ceasefire in the conflict, but later supported an immediate ceasefire in an April 2024 speech.

As Foreign Secretary, Lammy met with Israeli political leaders to push for a deal between Israel and Hamas for the release of hostages. After a Foreign Office internal review found a "serious risk" that Britain's arms exports to Israel were being used in violation of international law, Lammy suspended 30 export licenses for drone and aircraft components.

Lammy supported the International Criminal Court's request for arrest warrants against Netanyahu and Gallant, stating that "Democracies that believe in the rule of law must submit themselves to it". After the ICC issued an arrest warrant for Netanyahu in November 2024, Lammy announced he would continue meeting with Netanyahu for ceasefire negotiations but would order his arrest if he entered the UK.

On 17 March 2025, in response to questions asked of him in the House of Commons, Lammy twice stated that Israel's blockade of humanitarian supplies into Gaza was a "breach" of international law. This was the first time that a member of the UK Government had stated that Israel was in breach of international law. However, Keir Starmer's office publicly rejected Lammy's statement that Israel had breached international law by blocking Gaza. Starmer's office stated that it was up to the Foreign Office to decide whether Lammy should apologise for his criticism of Israel. On 18 March 2025, Lammy told Bloomberg it was a "matter for the court" to decide if Israel had breached international law.

==== Wes Streeting ====
In February 2026, British health secretary Wes Streeting released private messages between himself and ambassador to the US Peter Mandelson. The messages were released in the aftermath of the Epstein files disclosures regarding the relationship of Peter Mandelson and Jeffrey Epstein. In messages from July 2025, Streeting wrote that "Israel is committing war crimes before our eyes." Streeting also wrote that Israel was engaging in "rogue state behaviour" and that sanctions should be "applied to the state, not just a few ministers."

=== George Galloway ===
In January 2024, George Galloway announced that he would stand in the Rochdale by-election the following month, for his party; the Workers Party of Britain. He was elected in a political upset after Azhar Ali, the Labour candidate, lost the support of his party due to comments made regarding the Hamas-led attack on Israel. Galloway won almost 40% of the vote and overturned a Labour majority of 9,668. The Israel–Hamas war dominated the campaign. In his election speech, Galloway said "Keir Starmer, this is for Gaza. You will pay a high price for the role that you have played in enabling, encouraging and covering for the catastrophe presently going on in occupied Gaza, in the Gaza Strip". Galloway subsequently lost the seat four months later in the general election that July to Labour's candidate Paul Waugh.

== Protests ==
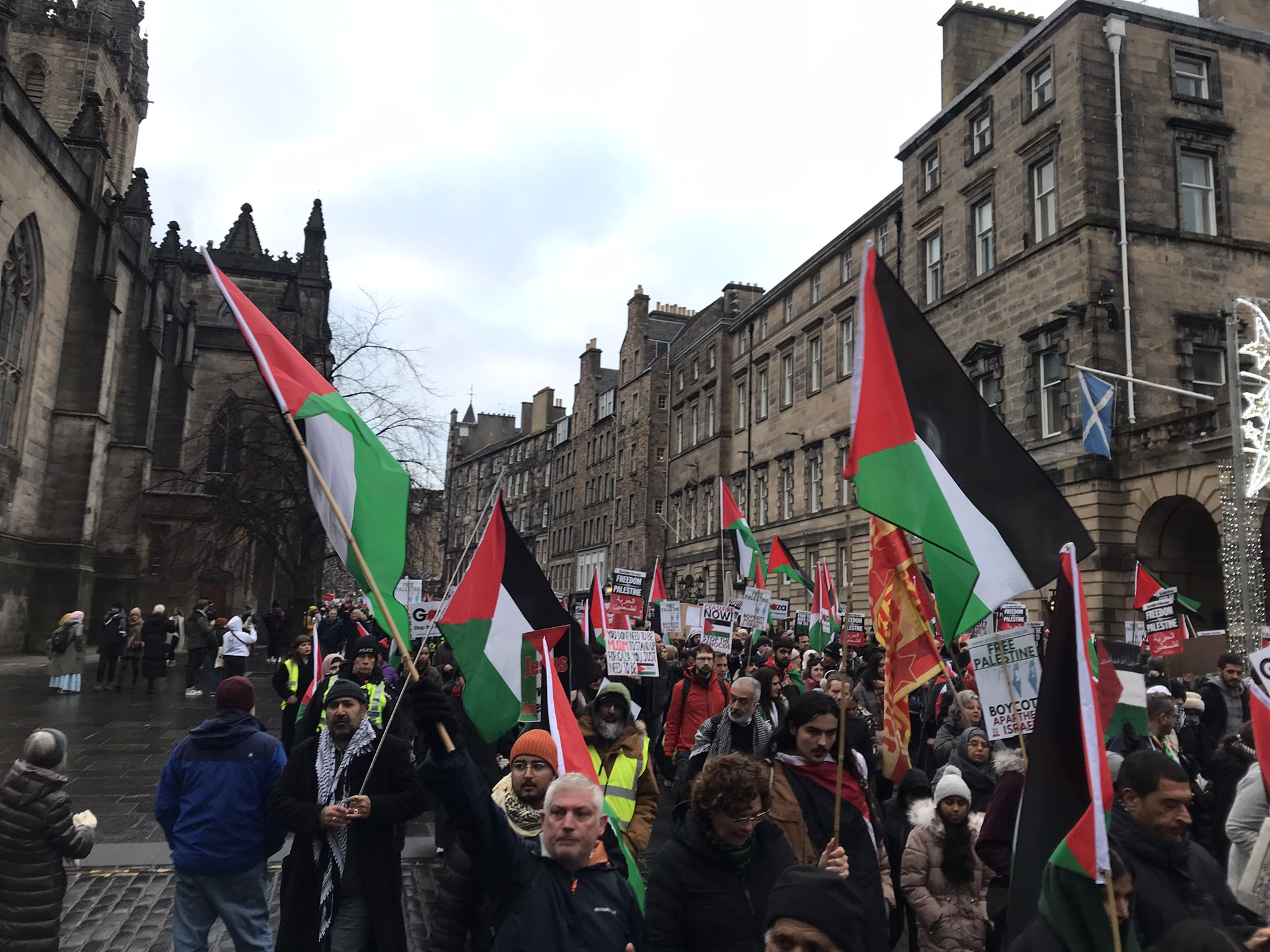
Pro-Palestine demonstration in Edinburgh, 2 December

As a result of the Gaza war, nationwide protests occurred across the UK. These demonstrations occurred as part of a broader movement of Gaza war protests occurring around the world.

In the following weeks during Israel's counterattacks on Gaza, a number of pro-Palestine vigils, rallies and marches were held throughout the UK. On 9 October, the Stop the War Coalition and Palestine Solidarity Campaign (PSC) attended a demonstration in which hundreds marched through London's Kensington High Street and outside the embassy of Israel. Demands were made for an "Intifada revolution". PSC said in a statement that Hamas's attack had to be understood in the context of decades of Israeli occupation and, for an end to violence from Israel and Palestinians, the root cause, Israeli apartide, needed to end. Three people were arrested at the protest. The largest demonstrations were held in London, with people from across the country in attendance: thousands marched on 15 October 2023, 100,000 on 21 October, 70,000 on 28 October, 30,000 on 4 November and 300,000 on 11 November. The 11 November march was one of the largest in the UK in years, with some estimating it was the largest since the 2003 protest against the invasion of Iraq.

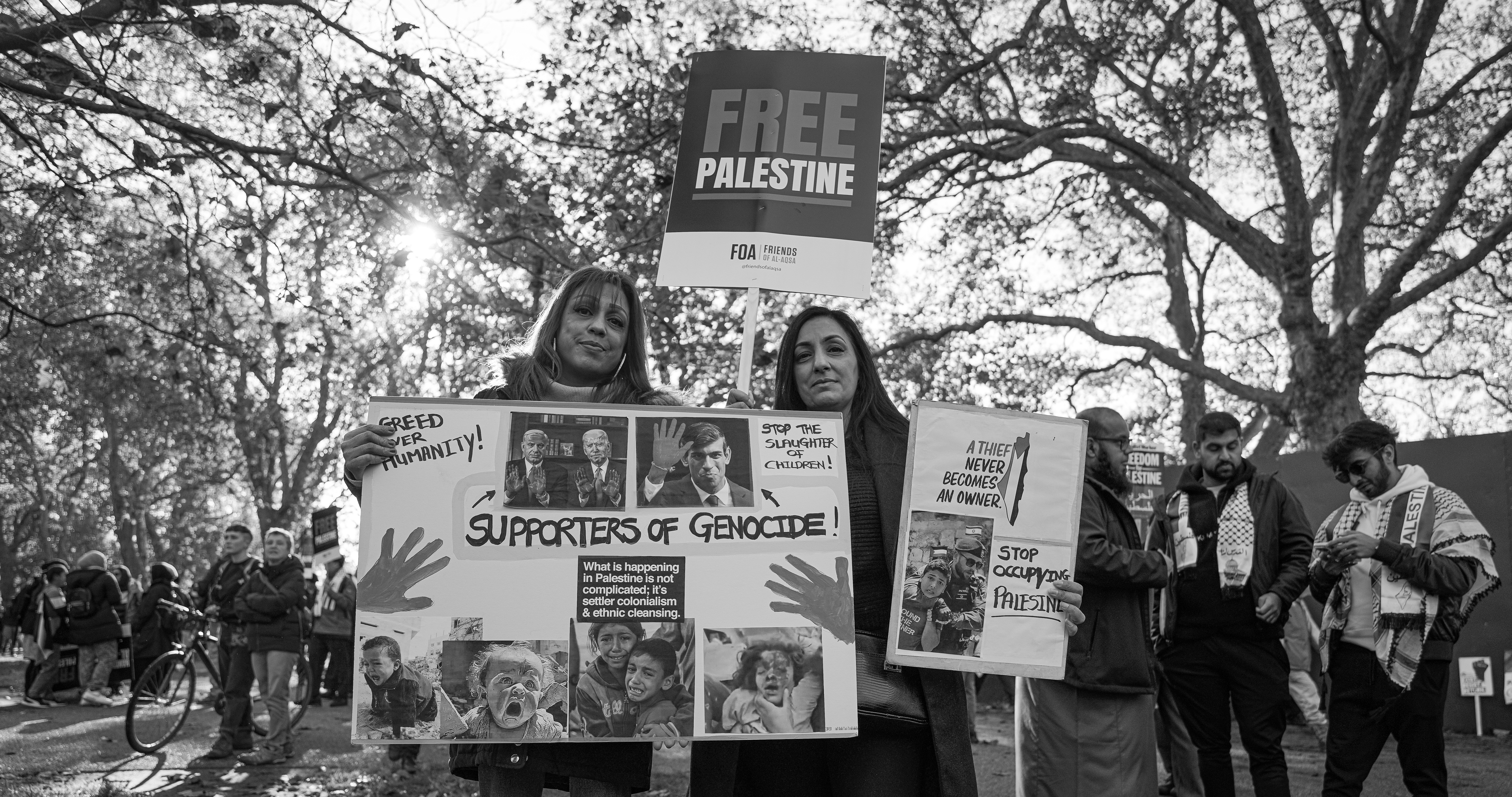
Pro-Palestinian protest in London, 11 November 2023

Hundreds of thousands demonstrated in other parts of the country: in Scotland, including in Edinburgh, Glasgow, Dundee, Forres, Dumfries and Aberdeen; England – for instance, in Leeds, Blackburn, Manchester, Sheffield, Birmingham, Oxford, Swindon, Bristol, Norwich, Brighton, Southampton — Wales, including in Cardiff, Swansea, Abergavenny and Newport; and Northern Ireland, including in Lurgan, Armagh, Derry, and in Belfast, where a protest was held in front of the US consulate.

Sit-ins were held at train stations, such as London King's Cross, London Waterloo, Liverpool Lime Street, Manchester Piccadilly, Edinburgh Waverley, Glasgow Central and Bristol Temple Meads. In Bristol, school children demonstrated through a series of school strikes and, in east London, high school students boycotted an assembly attended by Labour MP Wes Streeting over his party's refusal to call for a ceasefire in Palestine. At the Luton Sixth Form College, the student council was suspended for staging a walk-out. Protesters removed the Israeli flag from the roof of Sheffield Town Hall and raised the Palestinian flag; South Yorkshire Police later said this incident was a racially aggravated public order offence and a hate crime. Protesters demonstrated at the Science Museum.

On 26 November 2023, between 50,000 and 60,000 people joined in a march in London to protest against a rise in hate crimes against Jews since the attack by Hamas terrorists on Israel on 7 October. On 14 January 2024, approximately 25,000 people attended a rally in support of Israel in Trafalgar Square, calling for the release of the hostages held by Hamas.

=== Protests directed at politicians ===
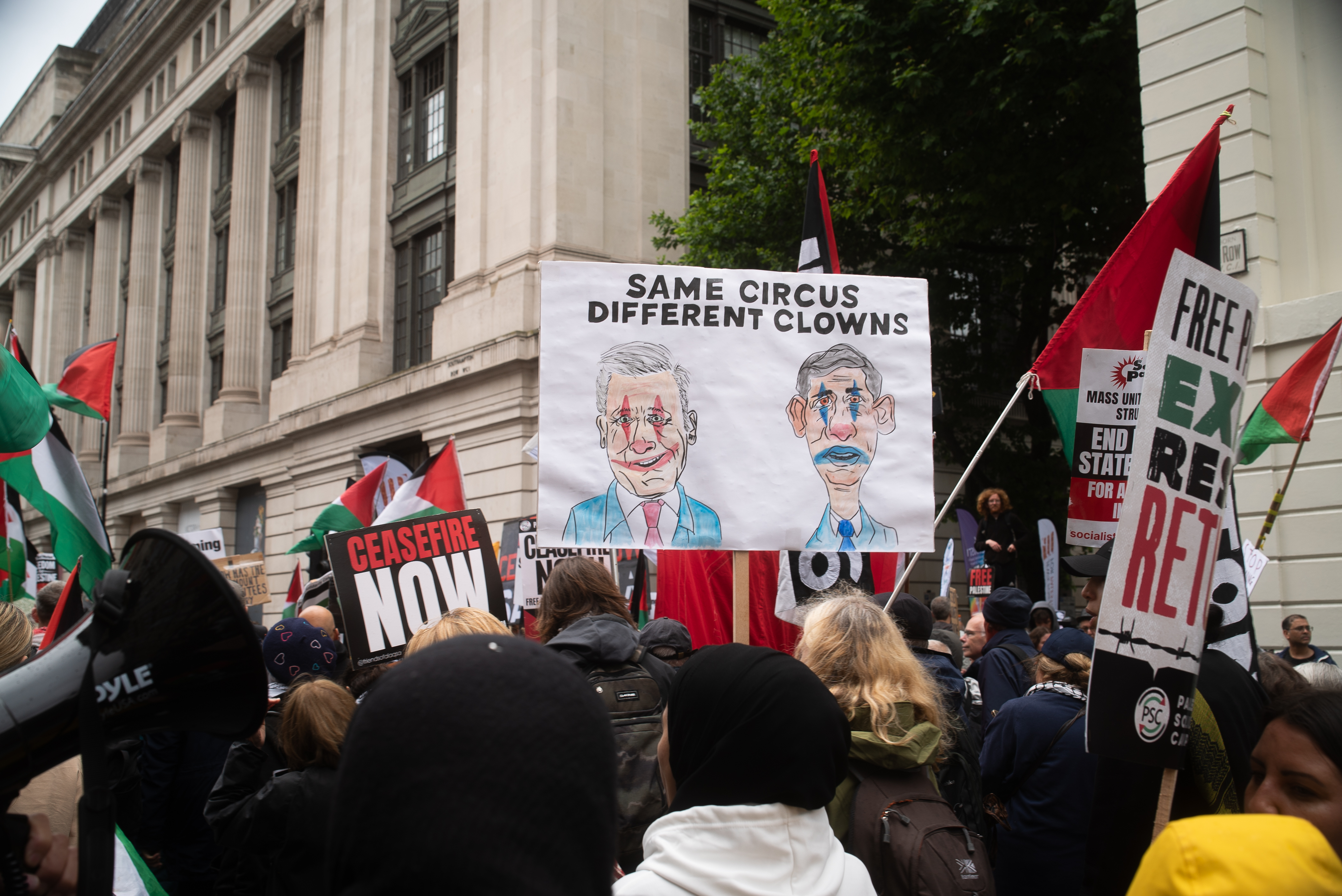
Pro-Palestinian protesters holding a sign critical of both Keir Starmer and Rishi Sunak

Pro-Palestine protesters expressed their disagreement and disapproval of political parties' and politicians' positions on Israel's actions towards Palestinians. Protestors chanted "Shame on you" at Conservative MP Michael Gove, Secretary of State for Levelling Up, Housing and Communities and Minister for Intergovernmental Relations, as he was ushered through London Victoria shortly after a sit-in at the station. Protesters interrupted Yvette Cooper's speech, holding up "Ceasefire now" signs, during the King's Speech debate in the House of Commons as she spoke about the crisis in Israel. Protesters demonstrated outside Labour's London headquarters, chanting "Keir Starmer, you can't hide, you're endorsing genocide" and calling for the party to "change their policy ... and to demand an immediate ceasefire".

Following a parliamentary vote on a ceasefire, from which the majority of Labour MPs abstained, MPs' constituency offices were targeted. Jo Stevens, one of the abstaining MPs, had the word "Murderer" graffitied on her Cardiff Central office, and stickers and posters were stuck up saying the MP had "blood ... on her hands" and supported the killing of babies. Protesters demonstrated outside the office of Peter Kyle, Labour MP for Hove, who also abstained on the vote for a ceasefire. The protesters left a list of demands at the MP's office, including that the MP denounce Israel's "illegal use of excessive force", call for an immediate ceasefire and demand a stop to arms exports to Israel. Steve McCabe's Birmingham Selly Oak office was another outside which protesters gathered, this time calling for the MP's deselection. Hundreds of people marched through Labour leader Keir Starmer's constituency and protested outside his office, critical of his handling of the crisis. 100,000 signed a petition to expel Tzipi Hotovely. Protesters interrupted an event held by Angela Rayner, with one woman telling Rayner, "You call yourself a modern-day feminist, I don’t think so." In January 2024, the speech of Labour's Shadow Foreign Secretary David Lammy was interrupted by pro-Palestinian protesters. In March 2024, a group of women protesting outside parliament shaved their heads in solidarity with the women of Gaza.

Amnesty International put up mock signs reading "Genocide Avenue" on the street outside the Israeli embassy in London. In April 2024, protestors rallied outside the Oxford Union which was hosting Nancy Pelosi; Pelosi's speech was reportedly drowned out by the sound of the protestors before being disrupted by two members of the audience with Palestinian flags who were later removed by police.

== Analysis ==
Yasmine Ahmed, the director of Human Rights Watch in the UK, stated that the government was employing double standards for Russian military activities in Ukraine and Israel's actions in Gaza.

== Opinion polls ==
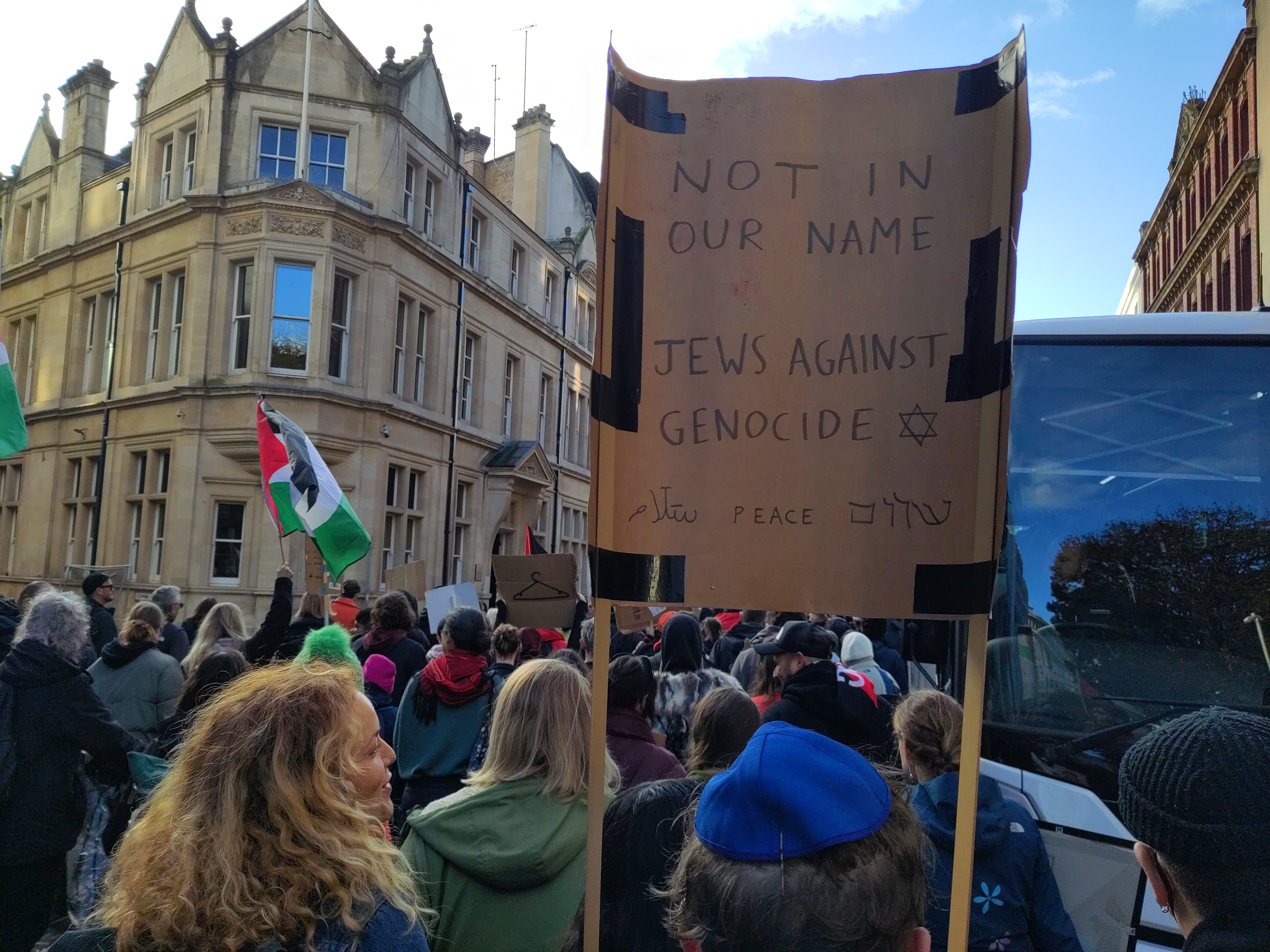
Pro-Palestine march in Bristol, 4 November 2023

According to a December 2023 YouGov poll commissioned by Medical Aid for Palestinians and the Council for Arab-British Understanding, 71% of the British public believed that there should definitely (48%) or probably (23%) be an immediate ceasefire in Gaza, while 12% thought that there should definitely not (6%) or probably not (6%) be an immediate ceasefire. Additionally, the poll found that 17% of the British public approved of the British government's handling of the conflict, while only 9% approved of the opposition Labour Party's handling of the conflict, revealing that there was "a total and utter lack of public confidence in the way both the UK government and the Labour Party have handled this".

== Pro-Israel lobby ==
Declassified UK revealed in February 2024 that 20% of Labour Party MPs have been received funding from pro-Israel groups or individuals, totaling £280,000 in donations.

== See also ==
- Israel–United Kingdom Free Trade Agreement
- Israel–United Kingdom relations
- British foreign policy in the Middle East
- United Kingdom involvement in the 2026 Iran war
- United States support for Israel in the Gaza war
