= European Services Forum =

Lobby group

The European Services Forum (ESF) is a lobby group of representatives from the European services sector that promote the liberalisation of international trade in services. It was created in April 1999 in order to give recommendations to the European Commission in the GATS negotiations of the World Trade Organization. Since 2012, the Forum is supporting the negotiations concerning the Trade in Services Agreement.

== Members ==
A wide number of services organisations are covered, including many from insurance, finance, telecommunications and employers' organizations.

=== Insurance ===
- Lloyd's of London (Great Britain)
  - it is not a commercial company but a stock market
- Zurich Financial Services (Switzerland)
- Comité Européen des Assurances (CEA)
  - composed of insurance associations of many European countries
- Bureau International des Producteurs d’Assurances et de Réassurances (BIPAR)
  - composed in particular of insurance intermediaries associations of many European countries

=== Finance ===
- Commerzbank AG (Germany)
- Deutsche Bank (Germany)
- Goldman Sachs (United States)
- Royal Bank of Scotland (RBS) (Great Britain)
- Standard Chartered Bank (Great Britain)
- International Financial Services London (IFSL) (Great Britain)
- European Banking Federation (EBF)
  - represents the interests of about 5000 European banks of all sizes.
- European Association of Co-operative Banks (EACB)
  - Deutsche Zentralgenossenschaftbank (Germany)
  - Crédit Agricole (France)
  - OP-Pohjola Group (Finland)
  - And other smaller banks
- European Savings Banks Group (ESBG)

=== Telecommunication ===
- BT Group plc (Great Britain)
- Deutsche Telekom AG (Germany)
- Orange S.A. (France)
- Telenor Group (Norway)
- European Telecommunication Network Operators' Association (ETNO)
- European Satellite Operators Association (ESOA)

=== Employers' organizations ===
- Confederation of Danish Industries (DI) (Denmark)
- Confederation of Finnish Industries (EK) (Finland)
- Irish Business and Employers Confederation (IBEC) (Ireland)
- Mouvement des Entreprises de France (MEDEF) (France)
- Svenskt Näringsliv (Sweden)
