= General Agreement on Trade in Services =

1995 World Trade Organization treaty

The General Agreement on Trade in Services (GATS) is a treaty of the World Trade Organization (WTO) which entered into force in January 1995 as a result of the Uruguay Round negotiations. The treaty was created to extend the multilateral trading system to service sector, in the same way the General Agreement on Tariffs and Trade (GATT) provides such a system for merchandise trade.

All members of the WTO are parties to the GATS. The basic WTO principle of most favoured nation (MFN) applies to GATS as well. However, upon accession, members may introduce temporary exemptions to this rule.

The agreement aims to recognize the increasing importance of service trade for the growth and development of the global economy and to create a multilateral framework of principles and rules for trading services. The expansion of such trade is expected to be facilitated by market transparency and the progressive liberalization, promoting economic growth of all trading partners and particularly aiding the development of developing countries. The goals are to be achieved through successive rounds of further multilateral negotiations, explicitly aiming to increase the participation of developing countries in service trade and to expand their service exports. The agreement also makes a point of addressing the serious issues faced by the least developed countries given their economic situation and their needs in the areas of development, trade, and finance.

The European Community, in accordance with its competencies, has ratified the agreements reached during the Uruguay Round of multilateral negotiations (1986–1994) and authorized the legal signing of the treaty establishing the World Trade Organization. This enabled GATS, included in Annex 1B of the Marrakesh Agreement, to come into effect across the European Community member states.

== Historical background ==
While the overall goal of GATS is to remove barriers to trade, members are free to choose which sectors are to be progressively "liberalised" (i.e. marketised and privatised); which mode of supply would apply to a particular sector; and to what extent that "liberalisation" will occur over a given period of time. Members' commitments are governed by a ratchet effect: commitments are one-way and are not to be wound back once entered into. The reason for the rule is to create a stable trading climate (i.e. a market). However, Article XXI allows members to withdraw commitments, and so far two members have exercised the option (US and EU). In November 2008, Bolivia gave a notification that it will withdraw its health services commitments.

Some activist groups consider that GATS risks undermining the ability and authority of governments to regulate commercial activities within their own boundaries, with the effect of ceding power to business interests ahead of the interests of citizens. In 2003, the GATSwatch network published a critical statement supported by over 500 organisations in 60 countries. At the same time, countries are not under any obligation to enter international agreements such as GATS. For countries that like to attract trade and investment, GATS adds a measure of transparency and legal predictability. Legal obstacles to services trade can have legitimate policy reasons, but they can also be an effective tool for large scale corruption.

== Four modes of supply ==
The GATS agreement covers four modes of supply for the delivery of services in cross-border trade:

Mode	Criteria	Supplier Presence
Mode 1: Cross-border supply	Service delivered within the territory of the Member, from the territory of another Member	Service supplier not present within the territory of the Member
Mode 2: Consumption abroad	Service delivered outside the territory of the Member, in the territory of another Member, to a service consumer of the Member	Service supplier not present within the territory of the Member
Mode 3: Commercial presence	Service delivered within the territory of the Member, through the commercial presence of the supplier	Service supplier present within the territory of the Member
Mode 4: Presence of a natural person	Service delivered within the territory of the Member, with supplier present as a natural person	Service supplier present within the territory of the Member

== Sectors addressed ==
Services sector classifications addressed in the GATS are defined in the so-called "W/120 list" or Services Sectoral Classification List, which provides a list of all sectors which can be negotiated under the agreement. The title refers to the name of the official WTO document, MTN.GNS/W/120. There are twelve service sectors (Business; Communication; Construction and Engineering; Distribution; Education; Environment; Financial; Health; Tourism and Travel; Recreation, Cultural, and Sporting; Transport; and "Other") divided into sub-sectors.

The agreement's Annex on Movement of Natural Persons Supplying Services Under the Agreement distinguishes the "movement of natural persons" for the provision of services from natural persons' movement aiming to secure access to an overseas employment market. Movement of natural persons for services purposes is seen as essentially "temporary".

== Criticisms ==
The GATS agreement has been criticized for tending to substitute the authority of national legislation and judiciary with that of a GATS Disputes Panel conducting closed hearings. WTO member-government spokespersons are obliged to dismiss such criticism because of prior commitment to perceived benefits of prevailing commercial principles of competition and 'liberalisation'.

While national governments have the option to exclude any specific service from liberalisation under GATS, they are also under pressure from international business interests to refrain from excluding any service "provided on a commercial basis". Important public utilities such as water and electricity most commonly involve purchase by consumers and are thus demonstrably "provided on a commercial basis". The same may be said of many health and education services which are sought to be 'exported' by some countries as profitable industries.

This definition defines virtually any public service as being "provided on a commercial basis" and is already extending into such areas as police, the military, prisons, the justice system, public administration, and government. Over a fairly short time perspective, this could open up for the privatisation or marketisation of large parts, and possibly all, of what today are considered public services currently available for the whole population of a country as a social entitlement, to be restructured, marketised, contracted out to for-profit providers, and eventually fully privatised and available only to those who can pay for them. This process is currently far advanced in most countries, usually (and intentionally) without properly informing or consulting the public as to whether or not this is what they desire.

== See also ==
- European Services Forum
- Foreign Affiliate Trade Statistics
- Trade in Services
- Trade in Services Statistics
- World Development Movement
- World Trade Organization
