= Trade in services =

Sale and delivery between a producer and consumer

Trade in Services refers to the sale and delivery of an intangible product, called a service, between a producer and consumer. Trade in services that takes place between a producer and consumer that are, in legal terms, based in different countries is called International Trade in Services.

== Methods of Trade ==
International trade in services is defined by the Four Modes of Supply of the General Agreement on Trade in Services (GATS).

- (Mode 1) Cross-Border Trade – which is defined as delivery of a service from the territory of one country into the territory of other country, e.g. remotely providing accounting services in one country for a company based in another country, or an airline flying between two international destinations
- (Mode 2) Consumption Abroad – this mode covers supply of a service of one country to the service consumer of any other country, e.g. tourism, telemedicine, or study abroad
- (Mode 3) Commercial Presence – which covers services provided by a service supplier of one country in the territory of any other country, e.g. a bank opening a physical branch or internet service provider offering internet services in another country
- (Mode 4) Presence of Natural Persons – which covers services provided by a service supplier of one country through the presence of natural persons in the territory of any other country, e.g. a business transferring an employee from one country to another for work duties (doctors or architects traveling and working abroad)

A "natural person" is a human being, as distinct from legal persons such as companies or organisations. Countries can freely decide where to liberalize on a sector-by-sector basis, including which specific mode of supply they want to cover for a given sector.

Mode 2 (Consumption Abroad) is by far the most liberalized mode in terms of commitments by WTO members. This is mostly due to governments being less likely to restrict the movements of citizens outside domestic borders (e.g. tourists). Mode 1 (Cross-Border Trade) is not often committed, mostly because it is impossible for many services to be supplied remotely (e.g. construction services), while Mode 3 (Commercial Presence) is more open, reflecting its crucial role in driving the international supply of services, transferring know-how and improving the capacity of economies to participate in global value chains. Mode 4 (Presence of Natural Persons) has the lowest depth of commitments, probably due to a number of sensitivities involved with the movement of foreign workers.

While the formal GATS framework recognizes four modes of supply, trade economists have identified evolving patterns in services related to manufacturing supply chains. In 2014, the European Commission Chief Trade Economist Lucian Cernat introduced the concept of "Mode 5" services. Mode 5 refers to services that are physically or digitally embedded into manufactured goods, such as design software or engineering blueprints, which are subsequently traded across borders as part of the physical product.

== Value of Trade in Services ==
In 2014, global trade in services totaled some $3.8 trillion, with Mode 3 (commercial presence) accounting for 55% of the total, followed by Mode 1 (cross-border trade) at 30%, then Mode 2 ( consumption abroad) at 10%, and Mode 4 (presence of natural persons) the lowest share, at less than 5%.

In wealthy developed economies, services comprise a significant share of GDP and employment. For example, services account for 70% of economic output in the United States and 75% in the European Union.

== Trade Agreements and Law ==
During the Uruguay Round of the General Agreement on Tariffs and Trade (GATT), the General Agreement on Trade in Services was drafted, and became enshrined as one of the four pillars of the international treaty comprising the World Trade Organization Agreement in 1995.

Regional trade in services agreements are also negotiated and signed between regional economic groupings such as CARICOM, North American Free Trade Agreement (NAFTA), ASEAN and the Commonwealth of Independent States (Commonwealth of Independent States Agreement on Free Trade in Services, Establishment, Operations and Investment). All single markets and economic unions (European single market, European Economic Area, Gulf Cooperation Council, Central American Common Market, CARICOM Single Market and Economy, Eurasian Economic Space and Mercosur) with "four economic freedoms" also cover free trade in services.

Beginning in February 2012, 50 countries (28 of which are represented by the European Union) around the world began negotiating the Trade in Services Agreement (TISA). TISA negotiations primarily comprised high- and upper-middle income countries who were members of the WTO and hoped to further liberalize trade in financial services, healthcare, and transportation between themselves. The agreement has not progressed since early 2016 due to uncertainty surrounding negotiations in the aftermath of many elections that occurred that year.

== Examples ==
Some of the most common examples of trade in service would be:

- Business and professional services, including:

== See also ==
- Trade in Services Agreement (TiSA)
- Trade in services statistics
