= Trade in Services Agreement =

Proposed international trade treaty

TiSA participating countries

The Trade in Services Agreement (TiSA) was a proposed international trade treaty between 23 Parties, including the European Union, United Kingdom and the United States. The agreement aimed at liberalizing the worldwide trade of services such as banking, healthcare, and transport. Criticism about the secrecy of the agreement arose in June 2014, after WikiLeaks released a classified draft of the proposal's financial services annex, dated the previous April. Another release took place in June 2015, and another took place in May 2016. As of 2021, no such agreement has ever been reached.

== Origin ==
The process was proposed to a group of countries meeting in Geneva called the Really Good Friends. All negotiating meetings take place in Geneva. The EU and the US are the main proponents of the agreement and the authors of most joint changes. The participating countries started crafting the proposed agreement in February 2012 and presented initial offers at the end of 2013.

== Proposed agreement ==
The agreement covers about 70% of the global services economy. Some claim that the aim of TISA is the privatization of worldwide trade in services in areas such as banking, healthcare, and transport. Services comprise 75% of American economic output. In EU states, services comprise almost 75% of its employment and gross domestic product.

For commitments on what the European Commission calls "'national treatment' (i.e. on equal treatment for foreign and local suppliers)", excluding commitments on market access, the following applies: Once a particular trade barrier has unilaterally been removed in an area where the country has made a commitment, it cannot be reintroduced. This proposal is known as the "ratchet clause".

=== European Union ===
The EU claims its trade agreements do not prevent governments at any level from providing services in areas such as water, education, healthcare, and social services. The EU has stated that companies outside its borders will not be allowed to provide publicly funded healthcare or social services. The EU has made its position papers, offers, and negotiation reports available online.

Market access for publicly funded health, social services and education, water services, film, or TV will not be taken. Therefore, the "ratchet clause" will not apply.

== Parties involved ==
Initially having 16 members, the TISA has expanded to include 23 parties. Since the European Union represents 28 member states, there are 50 countries represented. The number of countries represented in each continent are: 32 in Europe, 7 in Asia, 5 in North America, 3 in South America, 2 in Oceania, and 1 in Africa. The 23 TiSA parties in order of their income categories are:

Country/Territory Income Group	Parties
High Income	Australia; Canada; Chile; Hong Kong; Iceland; Israel; Japan; South Korea; Liechtenstein; New Zealand; Norway; Switzerland; Taiwan; United States; United Kingdom; European Union (27 countries)
Upper Middle Income	Colombia; Costa Rica; Mauritius; Mexico; Panama; Peru; Turkey
Lower Middle Income	Pakistan; Paraguay

== Controversy ==
The agreement has been criticized for the secrecy around the negotiation. The cover page of the negotiating document leaked by Wikileaks says: "Declassify on: Five years from entry into force of the TISA agreement or, if no agreement enters into force, five years from the close of the negotiations." Because of this practice, it is not possible to be informed about the liberalizing rules that the participating countries propose for the future agreement. Only Switzerland has a practice of making public on the Internet all the proposals it submitted to the other parties since June 2012. The European Union published its "offer" for TISA only in July 2014 after the Wikileaks disclosure.

Digital rights advocates have also brought attention to the fact that the agreement has provisions which would significantly weaken existing data protection provisions in signatory countries. In particular, the agreement would strip existing protections which aim to keep confidential or personally identifiable data within country borders or which prohibit its movement to other countries which do not have similar data protection laws in place.

=== Leaked contents ===
WikiLeaks released a classified draft of the proposal's financial services annex in June 2014, dated the previous April. Another release took place in June 2015 and in May 2016.

=== Software source disclosure mandate ban ===
The agreement bans government mandates that require disclosure of software source code as a condition for the distribution of that software and services related to it, stating "No Party may require the transfer of, or access to, source code of software owned by a person of another Party, as a condition of providing services related to such software in its territory." While there are exemptions for "software used for critical infrastructure" and non-mass-market software, the agreement would, for example, prevent governments from forcing suppliers of consumer network routers to supply the source code for the software for security purposes.

== Criticism ==
A preliminary analysis of the Financial Services Annex by prominent free trade critic Professor Jane Kelsey, Faculty of Law, University of Auckland, New Zealand was published with the WikiLeaks release.

The Public Services International (PSI) organization described TISA as:

a treaty that would further liberalize trade and investment in services, and expand "regulatory disciplines" on all services sectors, including many public services. The "disciplines," or treaty rules, would provide all foreign providers access to domestic markets at "no less favorable" conditions as domestic suppliers and would restrict governments' ability to regulate, purchase and provide services. This would essentially change the regulation of many public and privatized or commercial services from serving the public interest to serving the profit interests of private, foreign corporations.

One concern is the provisions regarding retention of business records. David Cay Johnston said, "It is ... hard to make the case that the cost of keeping a duplicate record at the home office in a different country is a burden." He noted that business records requirements are sufficiently important that they were codified in law even before the Code of Hammurabi.

Impacts of the law may include "whether people can get loans or buy insurance and at what prices as well as what jobs may be available."

Dr. Patricia Ranald, a research associate at the University of Sydney, criticized amendments from the U.S that would end public services such as public pensions and prohibit additional financial regulations, that can preclude reactions during a financial crisis.

Regarding the secrecy of the draft, Professor Kelsey commented: "The secrecy of negotiating documents exceeds even the Trans-Pacific Partnership Agreement (TPP) and runs counter to moves in the WTO towards greater openness." Johnston adds, "It is impossible to obey a law or know how it affects you when the law is secret."

Canadian activist and politician Maude Barlow argued the TISA didn't protect semi-public services funded by private subjects and by the public authority. She opposed an agreement that "will make it impossible for governments to reverse privatization or decrease the influence of the private sector. Governments will only be able to choose to maintain privatized services as they are or to extend liberalization." For profit corporations were enabled to sue a supranational judicial system so as to avoid the domestic courts.

== See also ==
- European Services Forum – lobby
- Ratchet effect § Trade legislation
- Trans Pacific Partnership (TPP)
- Trans-Atlantic Trade and Investment Partnership (TTIP)
- Transatlantic Free Trade Area (TAFTA)
- Comprehensive Economic and Trade Agreement (CETA)
