= Foreign affiliate trade statistics =

Foreign affiliate trade statistics (FATS), also known as transnational corporation (TNC) data details the economic operations of foreign direct investment-based enterprises.

Collection of such information, and aggregation at the national level, can provide economists and policymakers with insight as to the relationship that transnational corporations, being FDI-related enterprises, have on economies.

FATS indicators - including:

- employment information,
- expenditures,
- exports and imports (specific to FDI-owned firms)
- inter- and intra-firm trade,
- profits,
- sales,
- value-added (product).

Inward FATS - Data which represent the operations of foreign-owned (in the FDI sense, i.e. at a minimum of 10% of book value) firms in the local economy, or country.

Outward FATS - Data which represent the operations firms abroad, which are owned by a firm in our home-country ("owned" in the FDI sense, i.e. at a minimum of 10% of book value).

FATS are an economic indicator which has a direct linkage to WTO-GATS Mode 3 Legal Commitments; GATS Mode 3 is one of the Four Modes of Supply enshrined as the framework of the General Agreement on Trade in Services GATS of the World Trade Organization WTO.

FATS describe economic activities which take place as a result of WTO-GATS Mode 3 enterprise trade, or trade which takes place under Commercial Presence circumstances.

The standard for definition for Commercial Presence in the WTO-GATS differs from the generally accepted definition of FDI, which under IMF Balance of Payments Volume 5 standards is 10%; WTO-GATS Commercial Presence defines ownership level benchmarks at 10% of enterprise book value.

== See also ==
- Foreign direct investment
- General Agreement on Trade in Services

== Statistical databases on Services Trade Statistics, FDI and FATS ==
- OECD statistics on trade in services database
- OECD statistics on value added and employment
- OECD Statistics for Trade in Services from Publication
- Eurostat - Statistics Explained: Foreign affiliates statistics - FATS
- Eurostat database: Industry, Trade and Services
- US BEA page on international economic accounts
- JETRO database for FDI and trade in goods and services
- UNCTAD FDI/FATS database
- UNCTAD World Investment Directory online
- ITC/UNCTAD Investment Map: Foreign direct investment together with foreign affiliates, international trade and market access

== See also ==
- Foreign direct investment topics
